= Early Spring (1956 film) =

1956 Japanese film by Yasujirō Ozu

Soshun
- Theatrical release poster.

Japanese name
- Kanji: 早春
Transcriptions
- Revised Hepburn: Sōshun
- Directed by: Yasujirō Ozu
- Written by: Kōgo Noda; Yasujirō Ozu
- Produced by: Shizuo Yamanouchi
- Starring: Chikage Awashima; Ryō Ikebe; Keiko Kishi
- Cinematography: Yuharu Atsuta
- Edited by: Yoshiyasu Hamamura
- Music by: Kojun Saitō
- Distributed by: Shochiku
- Release date: January 29, 1956
- Running time: 144 minutes
- Country: Japan
- Language: Japanese

Early Spring (早春, Sōshun) is a 1956 Japanese film by Yasujirō Ozu and starring Chikage Awashima, Ryō Ikebe and Keiko Kishi. It is about a married salaryman who escapes the monotony of married life and his work at a fire brick manufacturing company by beginning an affair with a fellow office worker. The film also deals with the hardships of the salaryman lifestyle.

"I wanted," Ozu said, "to portray what you might call the pathos of the white-collar life."

With a runtime of 144 minutes, Early Spring is Ozu's longest surviving film, and his penultimate shot in black and white.

== Plot ==
Office worker Shoji Sugiyama wakes and goes about his morning routine, attended by his wife, Masako, before commuting to his job in the Tokyo office of a fire brick manufacturing company.

During a hiking trip with office friends, Shoji spends time alone with a fellow worker, a typist nicknamed "Goldfish" for her large eyes. After the trip Goldfish makes advances to Shoji and the two begin an affair. Masako suspects something is amiss but is reluctant to confront her husband. After Shoji fails to mark the anniversary of their son's death, he and Masako become progressively estranged.

Their friends, too, suspect something is transpiring between Shoji and Goldfish. They confront Goldfish, advising her not to come between a married couple. Aggrieved, Goldfish visits Shoji late in the night. Masako, convinced that her suspicions have foundation, demands that Shoji tell her the truth about his relationship with Goldfish. Shoji still lies about it, and the next morning Masako leaves the marital home to stay with her mother.

Shoji relocates to his company's office in the provincial town of Mitsuishi (now part of Bizen). Masako eventually travels to Mitsuishi and the couple is reunited. They promise to forget their past troubles and strive for marital happiness.

== Cast ==
- Chikage Awashima as Masako Sugiyama
- Ryō Ikebe as Shoji Sugiyama
- Keiko Kishi as Chiyo Kaneko (Goldfish)
- Teiji Takahashi as Taizo Aoki
- Chishū Ryū as Kiichi Onodera
- So Yamamura as Yutaka Kawai
- Haruko Sugimura as Tamako
- Takako Fujino as Terumi Aoki
- Masami Taura as Koichi Kitagawa
- Kumeko Urabe as Shige Kitagawa (Masako's mother)
- Kuniko Miyake as Yukiko Kawai
- Daisuke Katō as Sakamoto
- Kōji Mitsui as Hirayama
- Eijirô Tôno as Tokichi Hattori
- Fujio Suga as Tanabe
- Haruo Tanaka as Nomura
- Chieko Nakakita as Sakae Tominaga
- Nobuo Nakamura as Arakawa
- Seiji Miyaguchi as Tamako's husband
- Tsûsai Sugawara as Shige's customer

== Production ==
After the release of Tokyo Story, Ozu was called upon to assist his friend, the actress Kinuyo Tanaka, in completing her second film as director, The Moon Has Risen. By the time production on Early Spring began, Ozu had been away from the director's chair for three years: a substantial hiatus for someone who had averaged a picture a year since the end of the Second World War. In the meantime, the "Ofuna-cho" or "home drama", the genre of film with which Ozu was most closely associated, had decreased in popularity. Ozu maintained that "the traditions of the Ofuna-cho are the result of 30 years. They are not going to fall in one morning". Nevertheless, under pressure from his studio, Ozu made several concessions to modernity. He cast mostly young and popular actors, and, with long-time collaborator Kōgo Noda, delivered a script devoid of the dominant parental figures that were a fixture of his previous films. The theme of communication problems between generations, another familiar trope of Ozu's work, was also absent. In its place was the theme of disillusionment with life as a salaryman. "I wanted to have a go at representing their lifestyle," said Ozu. "The thrill and aspirations one feels as a fresh graduate entering society gradually wane as the days go by. Even working diligently for thirty years doesn't amount to much."

Early Spring makes use of temporal ellipses, gaps in the narrative into which the audience is invited to project meaning, which are common in Ozu's films. For example, after Shoji and Goldfish begin their fling we do not see them alone together until Goldfish visits Shoji's home. Since this is after the pair's friends have confronted Goldfish, we, like the friends, do not know for certain if the affair is ongoing. Ozu also omits potentially melodramatic moments: Masako does not discover her husband's lipstick-stained handkerchief on screen, but instead recounts the discovery to her mother.

== Reception ==
Rotten Tomatoes reports 100% approval for Early Spring, with an average rating of 8/10.

In a highly positive review, Nora Sayre of The New York Times wrote that the work "conveys the claustrophobia of office life better than any other film I've seen", and that "Ozu finds dramatic depths in quiet, ordinary lives. And during the time that you spend with these people—the span of the movie—you really feel that you've come to know them well, to understand why their relationships do or don't develop." Sayre wrote that the characters' "emotions or hidden instincts are brilliantly revealed through small details".

In The New Yorker, Richard Brody argued that "Ozu’s despairing view of postwar Japan looks as harshly at blind modernization as it does at decadent tradition."

Don Druker of the Chicago Reader called the film a "casual yet meticulously detailed reconstruction of Japan's routinized white-collar milieu".

Despite the praise, it is not one of Ozu's most renowned works.

Leonard Maltin gave it three of four stars: "Incisive exploration of isolation and alienation in post-WW2 Japan; ... "

== Home media ==
In 2007, The Criterion Collection released the film as part of the DVD box set Eclipse Series 3: Late Ozu.

In 2012, the BFI released the film on Region 2 DVD, along with Tokyo Twilight and Woman of Tokyo, as Three Melodramas.
