= Chikage Awashima =

Japanese actress (1924–2012)

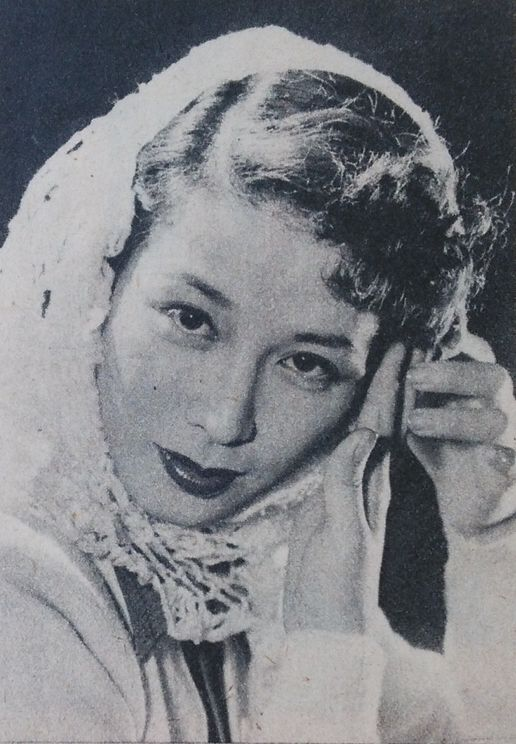
- Chikage Awashima, ca. 1952.
- Born: Keiko Nakagawa; 24 February 1924; Tokyo, Japan
- Died: 16 February 2012 (aged 87); Tokyo, Japan
- Occupation: Actress
- Years active: 1939–2011

Chikage Awashima (淡島 千景, Awashima Chikage; born Keiko Nakagawa, 24 February 1924 – 16 February 2012) was a Japanese film and stage actress.

== Life ==
A graduate from Takarazuka Music and Dance School and member of the Takarazuka Revue, Chikage Awashima entered the Shochiku film studios and made her film debut in 1950. She appeared in films of numerous prominent directors like Yasujirō Ozu, Mikio Naruse, Keisuke Kinoshita, Tadashi Imai and Heinosuke Gosho. She received twice the Blue Ribbon Award and twice the Mainichi Film Award for her performances.

Awashima retired from the stage in 2009. On 16 February 2012, eight days before her 88th birthday, she died from pancreatic cancer.

== Selected filmography ==
=== Film ===
Year	Title	Role	Director	Notes
1950	Ten'ya wan'ya		Minoru Shibuya	Screen debut
1951	The Good Fairy	Itsuko Kitaura	Keisuke Kinoshita	
1951	Early Summer	Aya Tamura	Yasujirō Ozu	
1952	Nami	Nonomiya	Noboru Nakamura	
1952	The Flavor of Green Tea over Rice	Aya Amamiya	Yasujirō Ozu	
1952	Carmen's Pure Love	Chidori	Keisuke Kinoshita	
1953	An Inlet of Muddy Water	O-Riki	Tadashi Imai	
1955	Marital Relations	Chōko	Shirō Toyoda	
1956	Early Spring	Masako Sugiyama	Yasujirō Ozu	
1956	Zangiku monogatari	Otoku	Koji Shima	
1956	Bridge of Japan	Otaka Inaba	Kon Ichikawa	
1957	Yellow Crow	Machiko Yoshida	Heinosuke Gosho	
1958	The Loyal 47 Ronin	Riku Ōishi	Kunio Watanabe	
1958	Summer Clouds	Yae	Mikio Naruse	
1958	Nichiren: A Man of Many Miracles	Shirabyōshi	Kunio Watanabe	
1959	The Human Condition	Kin	Masaki Kobayashi	
1961	As a Wife, As a Woman	Ayako Kōno	Mikio Naruse	
1961	Girls of the Night	Nogami	Kinuyo Tanaka	
1961	Mozu	Sugako Okada	Minoru Shibuya	
1968	Ō-oku emaki	Shino	Kōsaku Yamashita	
1968	Kigeki ekimae kazan	Keiko Morita	Tatsuo Yamada	
1976	Kigeki hyakuten manten	Aki Isogai	Shūe Matsubayashi	
1983	Children of Nagasaki	Tsumo	Keisuke Kinoshita	
1994	Natsu no niwa	Yayoi Kokō	Shinji Sōmai	
2005	Daiteiden no yoru ni	Sayoko	Takashi Minamoto	
2010	Haru's Journey	Shigeko Ichiyama	Masahiro Kobayashi	

=== Television ===
Year	Title	Role	Network	Notes
1963	Hana no Shōgai	Murayama Taka	NHK	Taiga drama
1964	Akō Rōshi	Osen	NHK	Taiga drama
2006	Imo tako nankin	Ume Hanaoka	NHK	Asadora
2011	Wataru Seken wa Oni Bakari	Maki Hasebe	TBS	Final role

== Honours ==
- 1950: Blue Ribbon Award for Best Actress for Ten'ya wan'ya and Okusama ni goyojin
- 1955: Blue Ribbon Award for Best Actress for Marital Relations
- 1958: Mainichi Film Award for Best Actress for Summer Clouds and Hotarubi
- 1988: Medal with Purple Ribbon
- 1995: Order of the Precious Crown, 4th Class, Wisteria
- 1997: Mainichi Film Awards Kinuyo Tanaka Award
