= Yoshiko Okada =

Japanese actress (1902-1992)

- 岡田嘉子
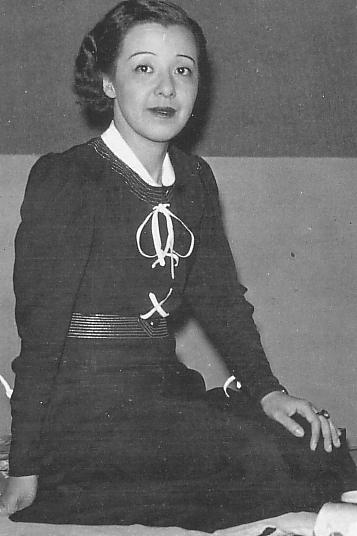
- Okada c. 1935
- Born: April 21, 1902; Hiroshima Prefecture, Japan
- Died: February 10, 1992 (aged 89); Moscow, Russia
- Occupation: Actress

Yoshiko Okada (岡田嘉子, Okada Yoshiko; 21 April 1902 – 10 February 1992) was a Japanese stage and film actress who defected to the Soviet Union in the 1930s.

== Childhood and youth ==
Yoshiko Okada was born in Hiroshima Prefecture on April 21, 1902. Her father was a newspaper reporter, her mother came from a farming family in Fukuoka prefecture; her maternal grandfather was one-quarter Dutch. Though the family moved several times, including to Busan in Korea, and she changed school eight times in her childhood, she received an excellent education. Her father's political leanings were very liberal (for instance, when her school visited the Imperial Palace he had her stay home) and this independent outlook remained with her throughout her life. In 1915 she entered the department of western painting at the Joshibi University of Art and Design. In 1917 her father became editor-in-chief of Hokumon Nippo, a Hokkaido newspaper, and upon graduation she joined him as a female reporter. Her beauty earned her some local attention and she was called on to act in amateur theatricals for charity. Her father was friends with Hogetsu Shimamura, founder of the revolutionary Geijutsu-za (Art Theater) and with the playwright Kichizo Nakamura, so in 1919, he took her to Tokyo to become Nakamura's apprentice.

== Shingeki actress ==
The Geijitsu-za staged avant-garde Western plays with real women cast in the female roles, something that hadn't been seen on the Tokyo stage for almost three centuries. When founder Shimamura died in November 1918 in the influenza epidemic and his star actress Sumako Matsui committed suicide in despair two months later the theater was disbanded, but Nakamura partnered with Shochiku to launch the Shin-Geijutsuza (New Art Theater) and on March 1, 1919, Okada made her professional stage debut in a minor role in Carmen. This theater also disbanded and she toured the Tohoku region with the Shin-bungei Kyōkai (New Literary Association). She had a relationship with Yoshiharu Hattori, a member of the troupe and became pregnant; Hattori urged her to marry him but she refused and the child was registered at birth as her brother (he would become a doctor after the war and in Shanghai took care of deposed emperor Pu Yi's niece). She continued as a guest performer with many theater companies and rose to become a star of modern theater. While on tour, she became lovers with her co-star Takaya Yamada; A jealous Hattori would throw himself under a train in 1925.

== Cinematic stardom ==
In the fledgling film industry as well women were only starting to be cast in female roles; in 1922, senior onnagata including the actor and director Teinosuke Kinugasa, transferred from Nikkatsu Mukojima Studio to Kokkatsu to protest the hiring of actresses by the company. To replace them Nikkatsu hired Okada and Shizue Natsukawa. Okada's first film role was in 1923's Eizō Tanaka's Dance of the Skull based on Hyakuzo Kurata's play Serenity and His Disciple; with the huge success of this film her star quickly rose. She continued to appear in movies in parallel with her stage career, but Nikkatsu Mukojima studios were destroyed in the Great Kanto Earthquake of the same year. She also found out that Yamada, whom she had wanted to marry, already had a wife and patroness 30 years his elder. Troubled by the situation she left Tokyo and made a contract with Nikkatsu Kyoto Film Studios.

In 1925 she starred in The Magician of the city. Though she felt Minoru Murata's detailed cuts had not made the most of her acting, her performance in this work was highly praised as "perfect". Her following film, the melodrama The Earth Smiles directed by Kenji Mizoguchi was also a major success. She appeared in a total of 9 films in 1925 and despite the scandal of being known as Yamada's common-law wife regularly topped public popularity polls, in both 1926 and 1927 was second in Kinema Junpō magazine's Top Ten and won a great reputation as a breath of a new cinematic era. Her parents left their newspaper in Karafuto (South Sakhalin Island) and came to Kyoto to be with her.

== Scandal ==
In 1927, she was cast as the heroine of Tsubakihime, a big-budget adaptation of Dumas fils' La Dame aux Camélias. She began shooting highly motivated, but when violently scolded by Director Minoru Murata in front of the crowd at the location site, she ran off the set in embarrassment with co-star Ryoichi Takeguchi and disappeared; the newspapers wrote that she was in danger of committing suicide. Their romantic escape made them idols of the public but Okada, fired from Nikkatsu and blackballed by the film industry, had to return to the stage as her sole livelihood. The same year she and Takeguchi married but her beloved mother died of illness at the age of 46. In 1928 she launched the "Yoshiko Okada Theater Company" with the support of Sanjugo Naoki, a popular writer, and toured successfully throughout Japan and even China and Korea until April 1930 when the troupe disbanded.

== Era of Struggling Talkies ==
She then returned to Tokyo and established her own production company, turning her attention to talkies, which had only just begun in Japan and in which she felt her stage experience would allow her to excel. With her as star and Takeguchi as director they produced and marketed more than a dozen films about traditional music and dance. Taking up Japanese dance in earnest, she became a disciple of Shizue Fujima, earning the right to the dancing stage name of Yoshiko Fujikage.

In 1932, she signed a contract with the leading studio of the day Shochiku Kamata on the condition that she would take over the debts of Nikkatsu. With the growing popularity of younger stars such as Sumiko Kurishima, Kinuyo Tanaka, Hiroko Kawasaki, Sanae Takasugi and Yumeko Aizome, Okada had to settle for more mature and usually lesser roles but was still capable of star performances, including in Yasujirō Ozu's and Hiroshi Shimizu's first talkies. Until the Day We Meet Again, with only musical interludes and sound effects but no dialogue, couldn't make the most of her stage skills but was still critically acclaimed, ranking 7th among Kinema Junpō's list for 1932. That film is considered lost but Ozu's Woman of Tokyo and Shimizu's A Woman Crying in Spring largely owe their masterpiece reputations to her lead roles. Both directors had praise for her acting but she was shunned as a difficult actress to work with, and she wanted to create works that she could devote herself to. Ironically her last great film role might have been in A Sword Comes on the Scene, the lost avant-garde masterpiece of Teinosuke Kinugasa, whose rebellion against women actresses led to Okada's first steps in cinema.

== Escape to the Soviet Union ==
Alongside some minor film appearances she joined Masao Inoue's theater company and concentrated on stage appearances. Her relationship with Takeguchi was weakening and they had been living separately for a year. In August 1936, she fell in love with Ryōkichi Sugimoto, a Russian-style method acting instructor who was directing the troupe. Sugimoto was married, and was a member of the Communist Party. In 1931 he unsuccessfully attempted to enter the Soviet Union under secret orders from the leadership of the Japanese Communist Party in order to restore contact with Comintern.

With the outbreak of the Second Sino-Japanese War in 1937, Okada's films were censored as part of militarist restrictions on freedom of expression and Sugimoto, on probation due to his proletarian activism, was in fear of being sent to prison. To escape their mounting problems in Japan the couple decided to defect to the Soviet Union. On December 27, 1937, they departed from Ueno Station headed via Hokkaido for Karafuto. Okada had some familiarity with the area as her parents had lived there. On December 31, they stayed at an inn in Shikuka (in the present-day Russian oblast of Poronaisk). On January 3, 1938 they headed for the border on the pretext of visiting the police and crossed into the Soviet Union in a severe snowstorm. It was reported in newspapers as an elopement incident and surprised all of Japan. On January 10, the Soviet authorities notified the Japanese Consul General in Ako (now Alexandrovsk Sakhalinsky) that the couple had been escorted to the continent. The consul general requested their return but, on January 13, Soviet officials informed him that, upon investigation, it was determined that both persons had entered the USSR voluntarily and by their own means. In reality, as they had entered the country illegally their reception was very harsh; they were separated just three days after entering the country and would never see each other again. The Soviet authorities of the time, seeing Japan as a potential threat, accused them of espionage regardless of their intentions. Tortured and threatened, on January 10, Okada confessed to crossing the border for the purpose of spying. Also under torture, Sugimoto confessed that he, Seki Sano and Yoshi Hijikata, Japanese dramatists living in Moscow, and also soviet playwright and director Vsevolod Meyerhold were all spies. Their confessions were among the pretexts used for the 1940 purge and execution of world-renowned director Meyerhold.

On September 27, 1939, a trial was held in Moscow where Okada fully admitted the indictment and was sentenced to 10 years deprivation of liberty. Sugimoto completely denied the charges, was sentenced to death by firing squad, and was executed on December 26 (His execution was only revealed to Okada after perestroika; she had previously been told he died of illness in prison). Okada was sent to the NKVD's Vyatka Camp 1 in Kirov province, 800 kilometers northeast of Moscow. She wrote petitions to the Soviet authorities for a retrial, which were ignored. On January 7, 1943, she was transferred to the NKVD Prison of Internal Affairs in Moscow, and was released on December 4, 1947. Soviet authorities fabricated a fictional career for the five years before her release but her activities and duties in the NKVD prison in Moscow are not clear; she was rumored to have been on a top-secret mission. After the war, she worked at Radio Moscow as an announcer for a Japanese-language broadcast and married Shintaro Takiguchi, a Japanese colleague 11 years younger than her and a popular prewar actor. She also attended the Lunacharsky State Institute for Theatre Arts, where she reappeared as a theater performer and was selected to co-direct the film Ten Thousand Boys with Boris Buneev, a work that has been called "the first Russian film about Japan not intended to be a depiction of the vicious Japanese enemy."

== Return to Japan ==
When World War II started, Okada was almost completely forgotten in Japan but when in 1952 Tomi Takara, a Diet member on an official visit to the Soviet Union, confirmed that Yoshiko was alive, interest in her suddenly grew. In April 1967, she appeared on a Japanese TV program broadcast from Moscow, speaking with the same straightforwardness she had been known for. In 1972, at the initiative of Ryokichi Minobe, the governor of Tokyo she returned to Japan for the first time in 35 years. She re-entered the Japanese entertainment world, appearing on the stage, in several films including one of Yōji Yamada's Tora-san series, and on TV shows such as "Quiz Fun Seminar" and "Tetsuko's Room". In 1994 interviews concerning her imprisonment in the USSR were posthumously aired on the NHK as a documentary The World: My Heart's Journey: Soviet Confinement and published the December 1994 issue of "Chūō Kōron" magazine as "Yoshiko Okada's Lost Ten Years."

== Last Years in the Soviet Union ==
In 1986, she retired from the Japanese entertainment industry and returned to the Soviet Union, saying, "Now that I am a Soviet citizen, I want to settle down and live there." She never returned to Japan, but gave interviews for Japanese TV programs, and even showed the inside of her Moscow apartment, saying she was always very happy when a crew from Japan came. In her later years, she suffered from mild dementia, and was cared for by people from the Moscow Japanese Association. She died on February 10, 1992 in a Moscow hospital at the age of 89.

== Selected filmography ==
- 1932: No Blood Relation – dir. Mikio Naruse
- 1933: Woman of Tokyo – dir. Yasujirō Ozu
- 1934: Our Neighbor, Miss Yae – dir. Yasujirō Shimazu
- 1935: An Inn in Tokyo – dir. Yasujirō Ozu
- 1976: Tora-san's Sunrise and Sunset – dir. Yoji Yamada
