= Nobuo Nakamura =

Japanese actor (1908–1991)

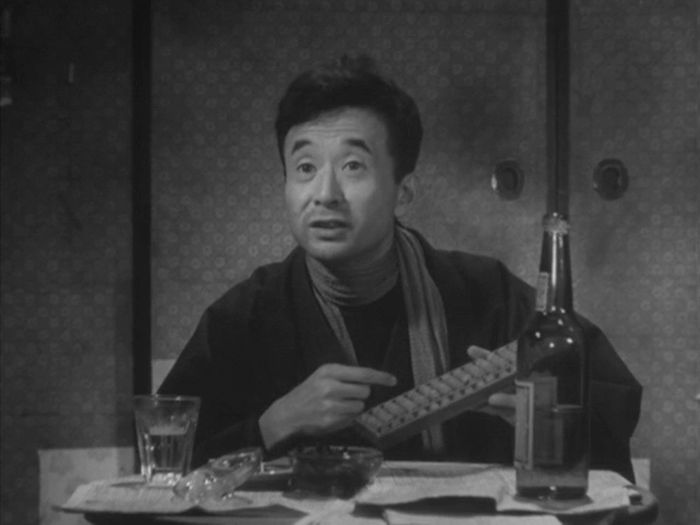
- Nakamura in Honjitsu kyūshin (1952)
- Born: 14 September 1908; Otaru, Hokkaido, Japan
- Died: 5 July 1991 (aged 82)
- Occupation: Actor
- Years active: 1932–1989

Nobuo Nakamura (中村伸郎, Nakamura Nobuo; September 14, 1908 – July 5, 1991) was a Japanese stage and film actor, who appeared in many films by Akira Kurosawa, Yasujirō Ozu and Mikio Naruse.

== Biography ==
A graduate from Tokyo Kaisei Junior High School, Nakamura studied at the Kawabata School of Painting. After the rejection of his work at an exhibition, he decided to become a stage actor instead, making his stage debut in 1932. He joined the Bungakuza theatre company in 1938, which he left in the wake of the "Harp of Joy incident" (the Bungakuza ensemble had split over the refusal of some of its members to perform Yukio Mishima's play The Harp of Joy) to become a founding member of the Geikan NLT theatre group in 1964, which staged many of Mishima's plays. He later joined the theatre groups Roman Theatre and En Theatre Group.

Nakamura started appearing in films regularly in the 1950s. Notable works in his filmography include Akira Kurosawa's Ikiru and High and Low, Yasujirō Ozu's Tokyo Story and Late Autumn, and Mikio Naruse's Flowing.

== Selected filmography ==
=== Films ===
- 1942: Haha no chizu – Hideo
- 1946: Urashima Tarō no kōei
- 1951: Jiyū gakkō
- 1952: Honjitsu kyūshin – Take-san
- 1952: Ikiru – Deputy Mayor
- 1953: Zoku Jūdai no seiten – Tateuo Ueda
- 1953: Aoiro kakumei – Professor Hisamatsu
- 1953: Senkan Yamato
- 1953: Tokyo Story – Kurazo Kaneko
- 1953: An Inlet of Muddy Water – Yasubee (Story 2)
- 1954: Itsuko to sono haha – Nomura, Chairman
- 1954: Tomoshibi – Keizo Kawamura
- 1955: Jū jin yuki otoko – Professor Koizumi
- 1955: Shichinin no ani imōto – Yukichi Kitahara
- 1955: I Live in Fear – Psychologist
- 1956: Early Spring – Arakawa, chief executive
- 1956: Farewell to Dream – Seiji's father, Haruo
- 1956: Shiroi magyo
- 1956: Gendai no yokubō – Takamatsu
- 1956: Punishment Room – Professor
- 1956: Onibi
- 1956: Konyaku yubiwa-engeeji ringu
- 1956: Flowing
- 1956: Hibana – Takayama
- 1957: Throne of Blood – Phantom samurai
- 1957: Tokyo Twilight – Sakae Aiba
- 1957: Hikage no musume
- 1957: Yoru no chō – Customer
- 1957: Sono yoru no himegoto – Ryusaku Endo
- 1957: Nichiro sensō shōri no hishi: Tekichū ōdan sanbyaku-ri
- 1958: Rickshaw Man – Yoshiko's brother
- 1958: Anzukko
- 1958: Hana no bojō – Kaō Hishikawa
- 1958: Equinox Flower – Toshihiko Kawai
- 1958: Akujo no kisetsu – Dr. Mizutani
- 1958: Haru kōrō no hana no en – Shuntarō Tanaka
- 1958: Half Human – Prof. Tanaka (uncredited)
- 1959: The Human Condition – Honsha Buchō
- 1959: Onna gokoro – Tsujinoto
- 1959: Hanran – Kuga
- 1959: Yajū shisubeshi – Professor Sugimura
- 1959: Anyakōro – Kensaku's father
- 1959: Kaoyaku to bakudan musume – Kōda
- 1960: Kuroi gashū: Aru sarariman no shōgen
- 1960: The Twilight Story – Sanji
- 1960: The Bad Sleep Well – Legal Adviser
- 1960: A False Student – Takagi
- 1960: Late Autumn – Shuzo Taguchi
- 1960: Oden jigoku – Masabumi Gotō
- 1961: Midaregami – Wataru Kamogawa
- 1961: Tōkyō yawa – Kyosuke Kamiko
- 1961: As a Wife, As a Woman – Kimura
- 1961: The Last War
- 1961: Machi – Public prosecutor
- 1961: Onna no tsurihashi – Shinkichi Haurno (Episode 2)
- 1961: Okoto to Sasuke
- 1962: Sono yo wa wasurenai – Taneda
- 1962: An Autumn Afternoon – Shuzo Kawai
- 1963: High and Low – Ishimaru, National Shoes Design Department Director
- 1964: Zoku shachō shinshiroku
- 1964: Geisha gakkō
- 1964: Hadaka no jūyaku – Serizawa, executive
- 1964: Dogara, the Space Monster – Dr. Munakata
- 1964: Mesu – Eitaro Shudo
- 1965: Daikon to ninjin
- 1965: Frankenstein Conquers the World – Skeptical Museum Chief
- 1965: Honkon no shiroibara – Nagahara
- 1966: Zoku shachō gyōjōki
- 1966: Fukuzatsu na kare
- 1966: The War of the Gargantuas – Dr. Kita
- 1966: Thirst for Love – Yakichi Sugimoto
- 1967: Japan's Longest Day – Kōichi Kido
- 1967: Sodachi zakari – Shingo Nakayu
- 1967: Scattered Clouds
- 1968: Shachō hanjōki
- 1968: Zoku shacho hanjōki
- 1968: Rio no wakadaishō
- 1968: Suna no kaori – Chief Judge
- 1969: Futari no koibito – Ryōhei Kōno
- 1970: Jaga wa hashitta – Head of N-Bussan
- 1970: The Militarists – Kōichi Kido (uncredited)
- 1971: Maboroshi no satsui
- 1972: Kuro no honryu – Daizo Kitagawa
- 1973: Tidal Wave – Japanese Ambassador to Australia
- 1973: Kōkotsu no hito – Fujieda, lawyer
- 1974: Karei-naru ichizoku – Matsudaira
- 1975: Zesshō
- 1976: Shunkinsho – Harumatsu
- 1977: Akuma no temari-uta- Hōan Tatara
- 1985: Tampopo – Intended victim of con man
- 1987: Bu su – Customer
- 1989: No raifu kingu – (final film role)

=== Television ===
- 1969: Ten to Chi to - Amari Torayasu
- 1972: Shin Heike Monogatari - Toba Sōjō
- 1978: Shiroi Kyotō - Professor Azuma

== Honours ==
- Medal with Purple Ribbon (1976)
