= Kogo Noda =

Japanese screenwriter (1893–1968)

Kōgo Noda
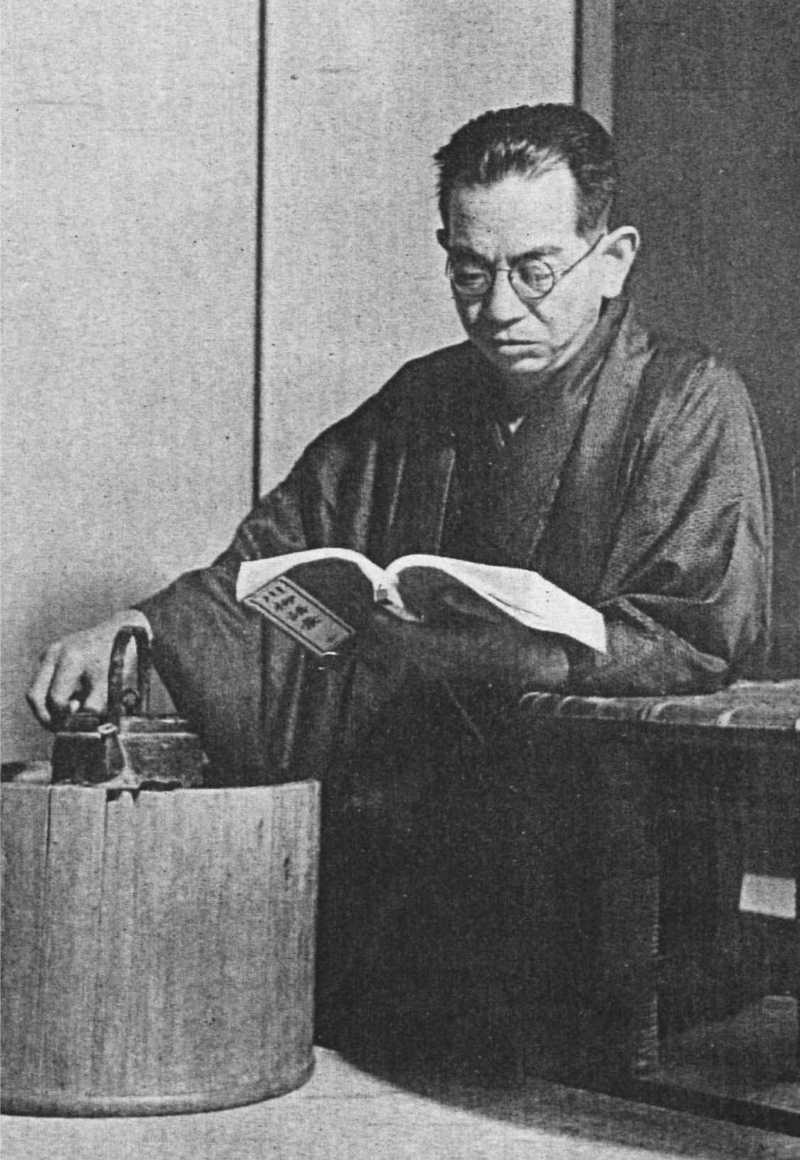
- Kōgo Noda in 1941
- Born: November 19, 1893; Hakodate, Hokkaidō
- Died: September 23, 1968 (aged 74)
- Resting place: Tama Cemetery
- Occupation: Screenwriter
- Known for: Tokyo Story

Kogo Noda (野田 高梧, Noda Kōgo; November 19, 1893 – September 23, 1968) was a Japanese screenwriter most famous for collaborating with Yasujirō Ozu on many of the director's films.

Born in Hakodate, Noda was the son of the head of the local tax bureau and younger brother to Kyūho, a Nihonga painter. He moved to Nagoya after completing elementary school and later went to Waseda University. After graduating, he worked for the city of Tokyo while also serving as a reporter for Katsudō kurabu, one of the major film magazines, using the pen name Harunosuke Midorikawa. On the recommendation of a scriptwriter friend from junior high, Takashi Oda, he joined the script department at Shōchiku after the Great Kantō earthquake. He soon became one of the studio's central screenwriters, penning for instance Aizen katsura (1938), one of its biggest pre-war hits.

He is most known for his collaborations with Ozu, which began with Noda supplying the script for the director's first feature Sword of Penitence (1927), and led to such postwar works as Tokyo Story (1953), regarded by many critics as one of the greatest films of all time. He co-wrote thirteen of Ozu's fifteen post-war films.

When the Writers Association of Japan was formed in 1950, Noda served as its first chair.

== Selected filmography ==
Year	Title			Director
Year	Japanese Title	Rōmaji	English Title	Director
1927	懺悔の刃	Zange no yaiba	Sword of Penitence	Yasujirō Ozu
1929	和製喧嘩友達	Wasei kenka tomodachi	Fighting Friends Japanese Style	Yasujirō Ozu
1929	会社員生活	Kaishain seikatsu	The Life of an Office Worker	Yasujirō Ozu
1930	結婚学入門	Kekkongaku nyumon	An Introduction to Marriage	Yasujirō Ozu
1930	進軍	Shingun	Marching On	Kiyohiko Ushihara
1930	その夜の妻	Sono yo no tsuma	That Night's Wife	Yasujirō Ozu
1930	エロ神の怨霊	Erogami no onryo	The Revengeful Spirit of Eros	Yasujirō Ozu
1930	足に触った幸運	Ashi ni sawatta koun	The Luck Which Touched the Leg	Yasujirō Ozu
1931	東京の合唱	Tokyo no gassho	Tokyo Chorus	Yasujirō Ozu
1932	靑春の夢いまいづこ	Seishun no yume imaizuko	Where Now Are the Dreams of Youth?	Yasujirō Ozu
1932	また逢ふ日まで	Mata au hi made	Until the Day We Meet Again	Yasujirō Ozu
1933	東京の女	Tokyo no onna	Woman of Tokyo	Yasujirō Ozu
1935	箱入娘	Hakoiri musume	An Innocent Maid	Yasujirō Ozu
1938	愛染かつら	Aizen katsura	The Tree of Love	Hiromasa Nomura
1939	続 愛染かつら	Zoku aizen katsura	The Tree of Love, Part II	Hiromasa Nomura
1939	愛染かつら 完結篇	Aizen katsura kanketsuhen	The Tree of Love: The Conclusion	Hiromasa Nomura
1940			The Legend of Tank Commander Nishizumi	Kōzaburō Yoshimura
1949	晩春	Banshun	Late Spring	Yasujirō Ozu
1950	宗方姉妹	Munekata shimai	The Munekata Sisters	Yasujirō Ozu
1951	麥秋	Bakushu	Early Summer	Yasujirō Ozu
1952	お茶漬けの味	Ochazuke no aji	The Flavor of Green Tea over Rice	Yasujirō Ozu
1953	東京物語	Tokyo monogatari	Tokyo Story	Yasujirō Ozu
1956	早春	Soshun	Early Spring	Yasujirō Ozu
1957	東京暮色	Tōkyō boshoku	Tokyo Twilight	Yasujirō Ozu
1958	彼岸花	Higanbana	Equinox Flower	Yasujirō Ozu
1959	お早よう	Ohayo	Good Morning	Yasujirō Ozu
1959	浮草	Ukigusa	Floating Weeds	Yasujirō Ozu
1960	秋日和	Akibiyori	Late Autumn	Yasujirō Ozu
1961	小早川家の秋	Kohayagawa-ke no aki	The End of Summer	Yasujirō Ozu
1962	秋刀魚の味	Sanma no aji	An Autumn Afternoon	Yasujirō Ozu
