= I Flunked, But... =

1930 film

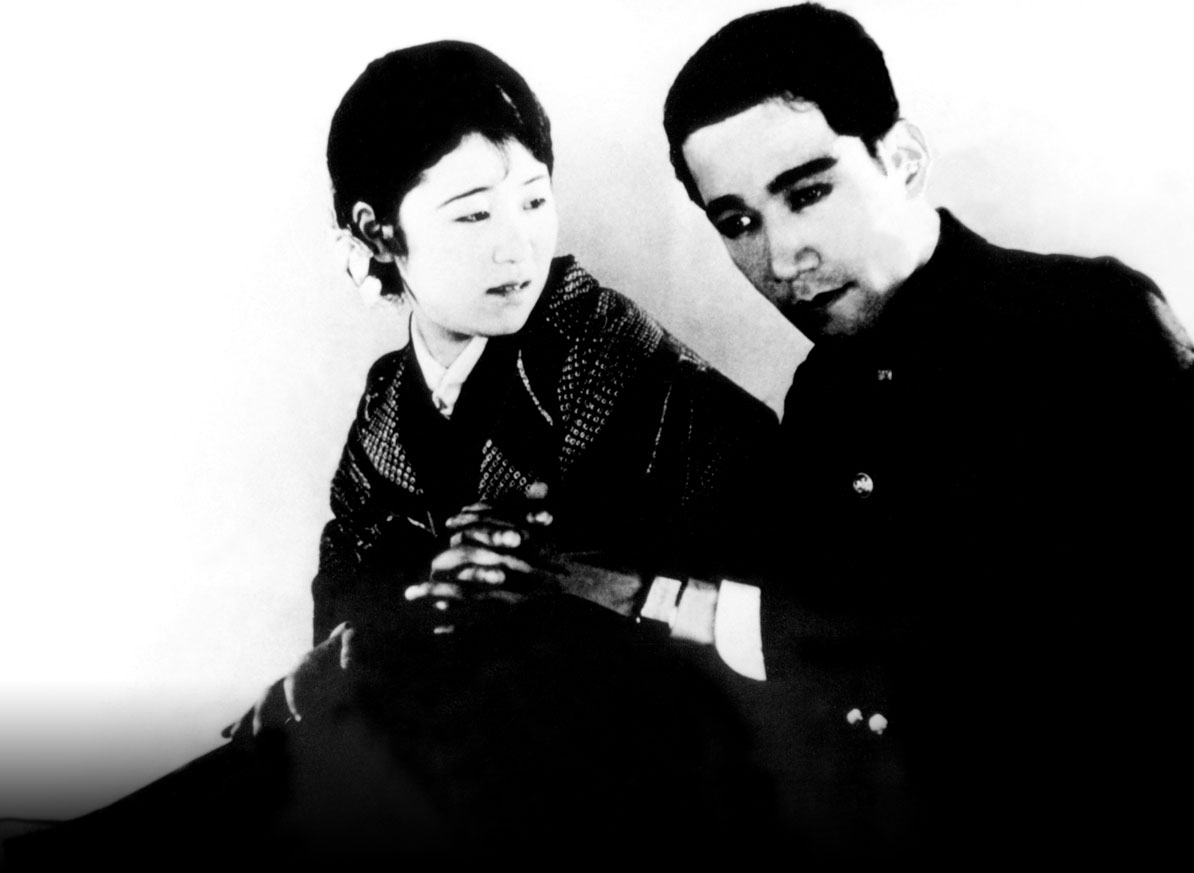
- Kinuyo Tanaka and Tatsuo Saitō in a still from the movie
- Directed by: Yasujirō Ozu
- Screenplay by: Akira Fushimi, Yasujirō Ozu
- Starring: Tatsuo Saitō
- Cinematography: Hideo Shigehara
- Edited by: Hideo Shigehara
- Production company: Shochiku
- Release date: 11 April 1930
- Running time: 65 minutes
- Country: Japan
- Languages: Silent film Japanese intertitles

I Flunked, But... (落第(らくだい)はしたけれど, Rakudai wa Shita Keredo) is a 1930 Japanese black and white silent film directed by Yasujirō Ozu. I Flunked, But... represented the first major role acted by Ozu's longtime collaborator Chishu Ryu.

== Premise ==
I Flunked, But… (1930)

The film is one of several Ozu directed around this time dealing with student life. The plot somewhat inverts that of Ozu's earlier film I Graduated, But.... The film follows Takahashi, a college student, and his 4 roommates and 4 other friends. Takahashi and his 4 friends intend to cheat on a test by writing notes on Takahashi's shirt. But the landlady sends the shirt to the laundry and Takahashi and his friends fail the test. Takahashi's roommates pass the test and graduate but can't find jobs and end up wishing they were back in school like Takahashi and his friends, who had to return to school.

== Reception ==
Film critic David Bordwell noted influences on the film from Harold Lloyd and Ernst Lubitsch. A Kinema Jumpo critic criticized for lacking the "social bite" of some of Ozu's earlier films.

== Analysis ==
Takahashi has a poster of Robert Milton's 1929 American film Charming Sinners hanging on his bedroom wall.
