= Sword of Penitence =

1927 film

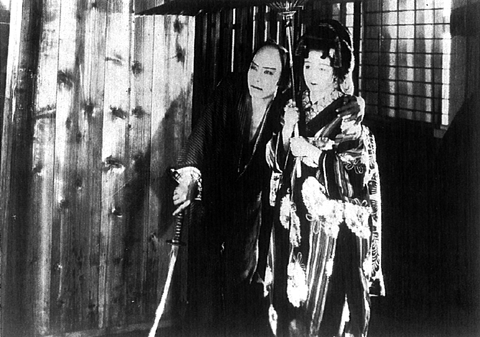
- Scene from the film
- Directed by: Yasujirō Ozu; Torajirō Saitō
- Written by: Kōgo Noda
- Story by: Yasujirō Ozu
- Produced by: Shōchiku Kamata Studio
- Starring: Saburō Azuma; Kunimatsu Ogawa; Kanji Kawara; Shōichi Nodera
- Cinematography: Isamu Aoki
- Distributed by: Shōchiku Kamata Studio
- Release date: 14 October 1927
- Running time: 70 minutes
- Country: Japan
- Language: Japanese (intertitles)

Sword of Penitence (懺悔の刃, Zange no yaiba) is a 1927 Japanese silent film written and directed by Yasujirō Ozu. It was the first film directed by Ozu and was also the first of his many collaborations with screenwriter Kogo Noda. It was a lost film. No script, negative or prints survive.

== Synopsis ==
Sakichi, who has just been released after five years in prison, is telling his younger brother Ishimatsu that he intends to turn his back on crime when an acquaintance of theirs, Genshichi, bursts in. Genshichi is in flight from officers of the law, having been disturbed in the course of a burglary. Sakichi and Ishimatsu allow him to hide with them, but Sakichi urges him to give up his life of crime. Genshichi laughs derisively and disappears. Sakichi apprentices himself to a rice-merchant and by his diligence and honesty earns his employer's trust. Ishimatsu steals a valuable hair ornament from Oyae, the daughter of a wealthy merchant. As he flees, pursued by the constable Manabe, he happens to meet Sakichi on the road. Without warning, he presses the ornament into Sakichi's hand and runs off.

Manabe sees the ornament in Sakichi's possession and is about to take him into custody when Oyae and her attendant arrive and tell him that Sakichi is not the thief. Manabe lets Sakichi go, but questions him about Ishimatsu. Sakichi denies knowing Ishimatsu's whereabouts. Manabe then reveals Sakichi's criminal past, causing him to be dismissed from his apprenticeship. Despairing, he turns to drink.

Ishimatsu finally decides to mend his ways and suggests to Sakichi that they should return together to their native village, but the disillusioned Sakichi says that society will not allow anyone with a criminal record to turn over a new leaf because it will not believe that the conversion is genuine. Some time later, Ishimatsu and Sakichi are pursued by the constables. They separate and Sakichi is aided by Oyae, who conceals him at her father's business premises. The next morning Sakichi hears the sound of money being counted in the next room. In a sleepwalking trance he raids the cash-box. Oyae's father refrains from condemning him as a thief and even gives him more money to enable him to make a new start in life. Sakichi goes home and is packing his belongings with the intention of returning to his native village when Genshichi arrives and demands a share of the money. After a fight, Genshichi runs away. By chance, he meets Ishimatsu and attacks him. The badly injured Ishimatsu makes his way to Sakichi's house, which is then surrounded by a party of constables led by Manabe. Sakichi fights his way out, goes to the house where Genshichi is hiding, kills Genshichi, frees Oyae, whom Genshichi has kidnapped, and returns her safely to her father, his benefactor. Ishimatsu dies, and Sakichi is left pondering in despair the choice between dying himself or turning to crime.

== Connection to American films ==
The film's plot was summarised in the Japanese movie magazine Kinema Junpō 「キネマ旬報」 (1 October 1927). The same magazine's review of the film (21 November 1927) points out that it owes much of its plot to American movies, including Kick In (directed by George Fitzmaurice in two versions, 1917 and 1922; Japanese title The Collapse of Civilisation [Bunmei no hakai]「文明の破壊」) and Les Misérables (1917, directed by Frank Lloyd). The two Kinema Junpō articles are reprinted in the collected works of Yasujirō Ozu.

== Cast ==
- Saburō Azuma as Kisarazu no Sakichi
- Kunimatsu Ogawa as Kinezumi no Ishimatsu (Sakichi's younger brother)
- Kanji Kawara as Katsujūrō Manabe (the Constable)
- Shōichi Nodera as Yamashiroya Shōzaemon
- Eiko Atsumi as Oyae (Shōzaemon's daughter)
- Miyako Hanayagi as Otatsu (O-yae's nurse)
- Hatsuko Konami as Omatsu
- Reikichi Kawamura as Kurikara no Genshichi

== Production ==
The film is the first that Ozu made after being promoted from assistant director to director. No script or prints survive today. Part of the film was directed by Torajirō Saitō as Ozu was called away for military service before filming was completed. Ozu said that it was an assignment he did not much relish: period films were regarded as less prestigious than modern pieces and he had a script of his own that he wanted to film. He only saw the completed film once, at the premiere, and it did not seem to him to be really his work. (Interview with Ozu in Kinema Junpō June 1952, Issue 1, quoted in Inoue, Vol 1, p 16)

== See also ==
- List of lost films

== Bibliography ==
- Hasumi, Shiguéhiko (2003). Kantoku Ozu Yasujiro [Director Yasujiro Ozu] (in Japanese) (Enlarged and definitive ed.). Chikuma Shobo. ISBN 4-480-87341-4.
- Inoue, Kazuo (2003). Ozu Yasujirō Zenshū [Collected Works of Ozu Yasujiro (two-volume boxed set)] (in Japanese). Tokyo: Shinshokan. ISBN 4-403-15001-2.
