= An Autumn Afternoon =

1962 Japanese film by Yasujirō Ozu

- Theatrical release poster
- Directed by: Yasujirō Ozu
- Written by: Kogo Noda; Yasujirō Ozu
- Produced by: Shizuo Yamanouchi
- Starring: Shima Iwashita; Chishū Ryū; Keiji Sada; Mariko Okada; Teruo Yoshida; Noriko Maki; Shinichiro Mikami; Eijiro Tono
- Cinematography: Yūharu Atsuta
- Edited by: Yoshiyasu Hamamura
- Music by: Takanobu Saitō
- Production company: Shochiku
- Distributed by: Shochiku
- Release date: 18 November 1962
- Running time: 113 minutes
- Country: Japan
- Language: Japanese
- Budget: 125,090 tickets (France)

An Autumn Afternoon (Japanese: 秋刀魚の味, Hepburn: Sanma no Aji; "The Taste of Sanma") is a 1962 Japanese drama film directed by Yasujirō Ozu for Shochiku Films. It stars Ozu regular Chishū Ryū as the patriarch of the Hirayama family who eventually realises that he has a duty to arrange a marriage for his daughter Michiko (Shima Iwashita). It was Ozu's last film before he died the following year on his 60th birthday.

Today, An Autumn Afternoon is considered by many to be one of Ozu's finest works.

== Plot ==
In 1962 Tokyo, Shūhei Hirayama is an aging widower with a 32-year-old married son, Kōichi, and two unmarried children, 24-year-old daughter Michiko and 21-year-old son Kazuo. Since his marriage, Kōichi has moved out to live with his wife, Akiko, in a small flat, leaving Shūhei and Kazuo to be looked after by Michiko.

Shūhei and five of his classmates from middle-school, Kawai, Horie, Sugai, Watanabe and Nakanishi, hold regular reunions at a restaurant called Wakamatsu ("Young Pine"), which is owned by Sugai. They reminisce about old times and banter with each other. Horie is teased about having a new young wife and asked whether he is taking pills to maintain his virility.

Their old teacher of Chinese classics, Sakuma, nicknamed Hyōtan ("The Gourd"), attends one of the reunions. He remarks that Shūhei went from school to the Imperial Japanese Naval Academy. Sakuma has too much to drink, and when Kawai and Shūhei take him home, they find that he has fallen on hard times and is running a cheap noodle restaurant in a working-class area. They meet his middle-aged daughter Tamako, who missed the chance to marry when young and is now too old.

Sakuma's former pupils decide to help him out by gifting him money and Shūhei goes back to the restaurant to hand it over. While he is there, Yoshitarō Sakamoto, the owner of a small local car-repair shop, comes in for a bowl of noodles and recognises Shūhei as the captain of the ship in which he served as a petty officer during the war. He takes Shūhei to his favourite bar. Hirayama notices that the bar-owner Kaoru resembles his dead wife. Kaoru puts on a recording of the patriotic song, the "Warship March", and Sakamoto marches up and down, mocking the Japanese military drill and singing meaningless syllables to the music.

Kōichi borrows 50,000 yen from his father, ostensibly to buy a refrigerator, but this is more than the refrigerator will cost. He uses the extra money to buy a set of second-hand golf clubs from his colleague Miura. His wife Akiko does not want him to do so, and says that if he is going to indulge himself like this, she will spend money on an expensive white leather handbag. Eventually, having made her point, she relents.

Sakuma tells his former pupils that because he selfishly kept his daughter at home to look after him, she is now condemned to a lonely life as a spinster. Troubled by this, Shūhei recognizes his own selfishness in keeping Michiko at home to look after him, and decides to arrange a marriage for her. He asks Kōichi to find out if Miura, of whom Michiko is fond, is interested. However, Miura reveals to Kōichi that he is already engaged. Kōichi and Shūhei break the news to Michiko. Michiko does not react but retires to her room. Shūhei and Kōichi conclude that she is not upset, but a little later Kazuo comes in and asks why Michiko is crying. Shūhei later asks Michiko if she is willing to go for a matchmaking session with a candidate Kawai has selected and Michiko agrees.

Later, Michiko is being dressed in a traditional wedding kimono and head-dress. She has agreed to marry, but the bridegroom, and the wedding ceremony, are never shown. After the wedding, Shūhei goes to a bar with friends while Kōichi, Akiko and Kazuo wait for him at home. Shūhei visits another bar alone and Kaoru plays the "Warship March" again. Two tipsy customers begin to parody the kind of morale-boosting radio propaganda announcements that were introduced by this tune during the war. When Shūhei comes home drunk, Kōichi and Akiko leave to go back to their apartment. Kazuo goes to bed, leaving Shūhei by himself.

In the final scene, a melancholy Shūhei drunkenly sings snatches of the "Warship March" before breaking down and going to the kitchen to sit down.

== Cast ==
- Chishū Ryū as Shūhei Hirayama
- Shima Iwashita as Michiko Hirayama
- Keiji Sada as Kōichi Hirayama
- Mariko Okada as Akiko Hirayama
- Teruo Yoshida as Yutaka Miura
- Noriko Maki as Fusako Taguchi
- Shin'ichirō Mikami as Kazuo Hirayama
- Nobuo Nakamura as Shūzō Kawai
- Kuniko Miyake as Nobuko Kawai, his wife
- Eijirō Tōno as Seitarō Sakuma, "The Gourd"
- Haruko Sugimura as Tomoko Sakuma, his daughter
- Kyōko Kishida as the proprietor of the bar "Kaoru"
- Ryūji Kita as Shin Horie
- Michiyo Kan as Tamako, his second wife
- Daisuke Katō as Yoshitarō Sakamoto
- Tsûsai Sugawara as Sugai
- Masao Oda as Watanabe
- Toyo Takahashi as waitress at "Wakamatsu"
- Shinobu Asaji as Yōko Sasaki, Shūhei's secretary
- Matsuko Shiga as woman at Kōichi and Akiko's apartment
- Fujio Suga as first tipsy customer at "Kaoru"
- Zen'ichi Inagawa as second tipsy customer at "Kaoru"

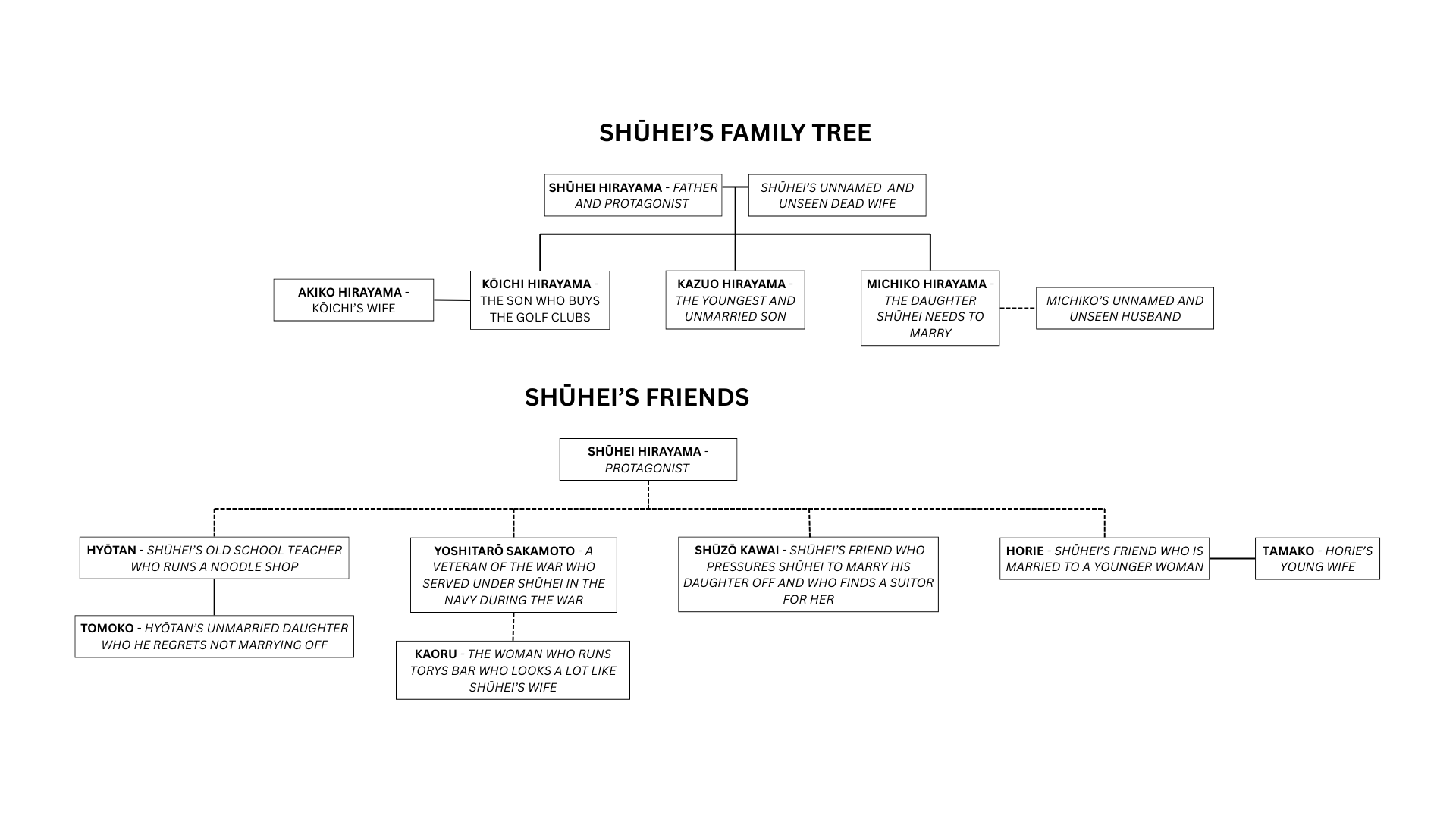
A family / friend diagram of the essential characters of the film.

== Production ==
The film was shot using Agfacolor, and the opening credits are placed before a backdrop of painted fronds instead of the sackcloth used in all of Ozu's previous films since A Story of Floating Weeds.

The Japanese title, The Taste of Sanma, refers to the sanma or Pacific saury fish. As a seasonal food, sanma is used in Japanese culture to represent autumn. The French title of the film translates to The Taste of Sake. Both these titles were found in a poem by Ozu in his diaries written after the death of his mother:

Down in the valley it is already spring
Clouds of cherry blossoms;
But here, the sluggish eye, the taste of mackerel-
The blossoms are melancholy
And the flavor of sake becomes bitter.

== Release ==
=== Reception ===
An Autumn Afternoon is widely regarded as a masterpiece. Film critic Roger Ebert placed the film in his "Great Movies" collection, writing, "From time to time I return to Ozu feeling a need to be calmed and restored. He is a man with a profound understanding of human nature, about which he makes no dramatic statements. We are here, we hope to be happy, we want to do well, we are locked within our aloneness, life goes on." Leonard Maltin gave it three of four stars, praising it as a "Contemplative study of loneliness and the fleeting nature of life ... " On Rotten Tomatoes, the film has a 95% rating based on 21 reviews, with an average rating of 9.2/10.

=== Home media ===
The Criterion Collection released the film in the US on DVD in 2008 and Blu-ray in 2014.

In 2011, the BFI released a Region 2 Dual Format Edition (Blu-ray + DVD). Included with this release is a standard definition presentation of A Hen in the Wind.

It was shown as part of the Cannes Classics section of the 2013 Cannes Film Festival.
