= I Graduated, But... =

1929 film

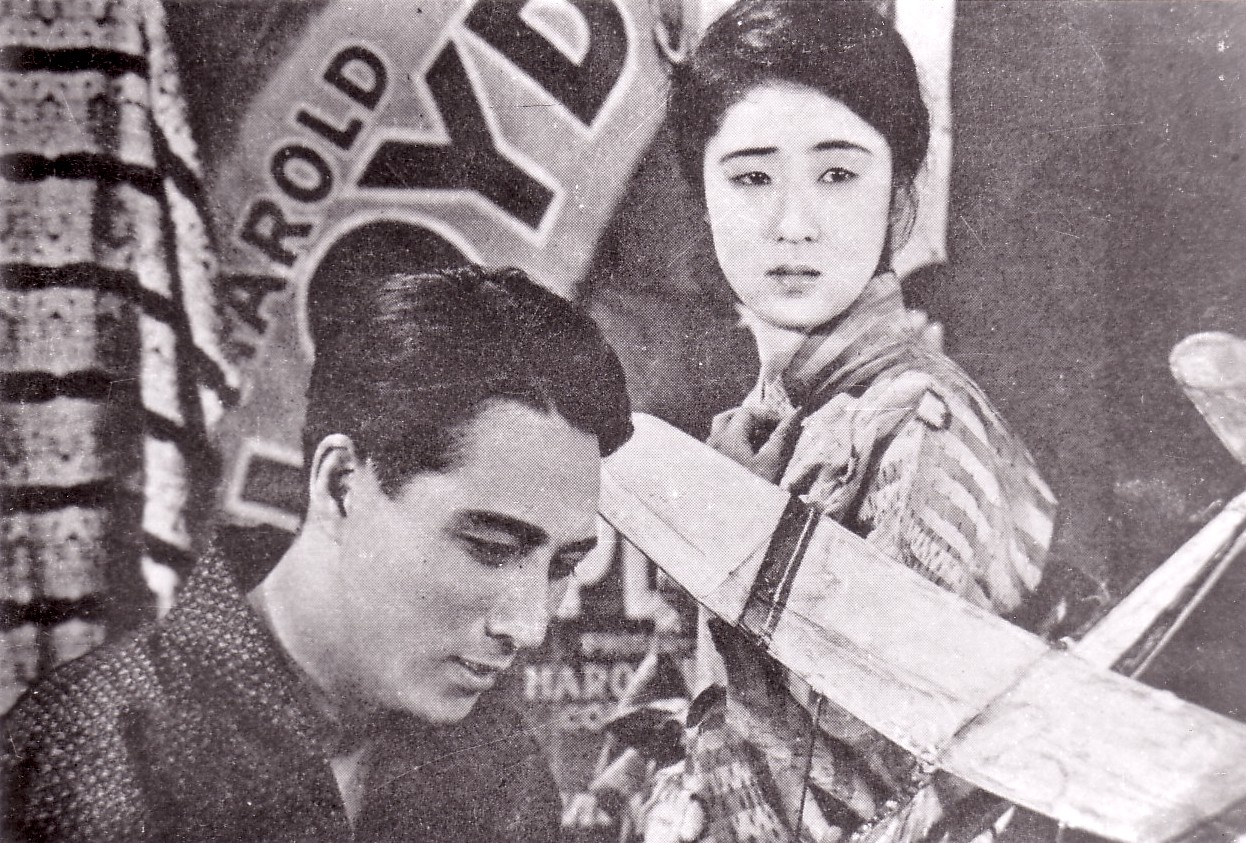
- Scene from the film
- Directed by: Yasujirō Ozu
- Written by: Hiroshi Shimizu; Yoshirô Aramaki
- Starring: Minoru Takada; Kinuyo Tanaka; Utako Suzuki
- Cinematography: Hideo Shigehara
- Distributed by: Shochiku
- Release date: 6 September 1929
- Country: Japan
- Language: Japanese

I Graduated, But... (大学(だいがく)は出(で)たけれど, Daigaku wa Deta keredo) is a 1929 Japanese silent film directed by Yasujirō Ozu. The film is now lost, except for an excerpt of approximately 10 minutes.

Ozu's friend and coworker Hiroshi Shimizu, who co-wrote the script, was originally slated to direct the film. Shimizu's wife Kinuyo Tanaka starred in the film.

== Plot ==
Surviving footage from I Graduated, But...

The plot involved a young man (Minoru Takada) who turns down a receptionist job after graduating college because he feels it isn't good enough for him, but needs to fool his mother (Utako Suzuki) and fiancee (Tanaka) into thinking he has a job. After he marries the fiancee he has to admit to her that he is unemployed so she takes a job in a bar. After an argument with her he apologizes for being irresponsible. He goes back to the company he turned down to accept the receptionist job, but they give him a salaried position instead.

== Analysis ==
=== Content ===
A poster from Harold Lloyd's silent comedy Speedy is used as a prop in the film. One visual gag in the film occurs when the man is apologizing to his wife and suddenly slaps her head, but it is then revealed that he was killing a mosquito.

=== Comparisons with other Ozu films of the same period ===
According to Donald Richie, Ozu's 1930 film I Flunked, But... was based in part on this film. To David Bordwell I Flunked, But... presents the opposite situation to this film, in that the protagonist does not graduate and so does not have to face unemployment. Both films reflect a theme that runs through several of Ozu's films of the period, that of youth unemployment in Japan at the time.

Akira Iwasaki described Ozu's films in the period starting with this film and extending to I Was Born, But... as having "more directly depicted the psychological depression of the 'dark period' than any other films." A Kinema Jumpo critic complained that the film's playfulness was "jarring" and that the happy ending detracted from the social message.

=== Structure of the film ===
Bordwell commented on the symmetry in the construction of the film, including how it begins and ends with scenes at the company office with opposite results, and how at first the man pretends to have a job when he does not but later his fiancee pretends not to have one when she does.
