= Early Summer =

1951 Japanese film by Yasujirō Ozu

- Theatrical release poster

Japanese name
- Kanji: 麥秋
- Hiragana: ばくしゅう
- Katakana: バク シュウ
Transcriptions
- Romanization: Bakushū
- Directed by: Yasujirō Ozu
- Screenplay by: Kogo Noda; Yasujirō Ozu
- Produced by: Takeshi Yamamoto
- Starring: Setsuko Hara; Shūji Sano; Chikage Awashima; Chishū Ryū; Kuniko Miyake; Haruko Sugimura; Kuniko Igawa; Hiroshi Nihon'yanagi
- Cinematography: Yūharu Atsuta
- Edited by: Yoshiyasu Hamamura
- Music by: Senji Itō
- Production company: Shochiku
- Distributed by: Shochiku
- Release date: 3 October 1951 (Japan)
- Running time: 125 minutes
- Country: Japan
- Language: Japanese

Early Summer (麥秋, Bakushū; lit. "Barley Harvest Time") is a 1951 Japanese drama film directed and co-written by Yasujirō Ozu, and starring Setsuko Hara, Shūji Sano, Chikage Awashima, Chishū Ryū, Kuniko Miyake and Haruko Sugimura.

Like most of Ozu's post-war films, Early Summer deals with issues ranging from communication problems between generations to the rising role of women in post-war Japan. The plot concerns Noriko (Hara), a woman who lives contentedly in an extended family household that includes her parents and her brother's family, but an uncle's visit prompts the family to find her a husband.

== Plot ==
Noriko, a secretary in Tokyo, lives in Kamakura with her extended Mamiya family, which includes her parents Shūkichi and Shige, her older brother Kōichi, a physician, his wife Fumiko, and their two young sons Minoru and Isamu.

An elderly uncle arrives and reminds everyone that Noriko, who is 28, should marry. At work, Noriko's boss Satake recommends a match for her with a forty-year-old friend of his, Mr. Manabe, a businessman and golfer. Noriko's friends are divided into two groups—the married and the unmarried—who tease one another endlessly, with Aya Tamura being her close ally in the unmarried group. Noriko's family gently pressures Noriko into accepting the match proposed by Satake, agreeing that it is time for her to marry and believing that the match proposed is a good one for someone her age.

Childhood friend Kenkichi Yabe, a doctor, widower, and father to a young daughter, arranges to have tea with Noriko and gives her a sheaf of wheat. The sheaf is a gift from a brother who was killed during World War II and who had asked Yabe to deliver it to Noriko in case he did not return. Later, Yabe is posted to Akita in northern Honshu, considered so rural that Noriko and Aya make fun of the area's accent. However, when Yabe's mother, Tami, impulsively asks Noriko to marry Yabe and follow them in their northward resettlement, Noriko agrees. When Noriko reveals her decision, her family is quietly devastated. They hint to her that the match is a poor one. When Noriko persists, the family is forced to live with their disappointment.

The family gradually accepts Noriko's choice with quiet resignation, and before she moves on, the family takes a photograph together. Noriko's parents console themselves that Noriko and Kenkichi will move back to Tokyo in a few years' time, reuniting the family. Meanwhile, the parents move to rural Yamato to stay with Noriko's elderly uncle. In the final scene, Noriko's parents watch a bride in her traditional costume pass down the country road in a ripe barley field.

== Cast ==
- Setsuko Hara as Noriko Mamiya
- Shūji Sano as Sotaro Satake
- Chikage Awashima as Aya Tamura
- Chishū Ryū as Kōichi Mamiya
- Kuniko Miyake as Fumiko
- Haruko Sugimura as Tami Yabe
- Chieko Higashiyama as Shige Mamiya
- Kuniko Igawa as Takako
- Hiroshi Nihon'yanagi as Kenkichi Yabe
- Toyo Takahashi as Nobu Tamura
- Seiji Miyaguchi as Nishiwaki
- Ichirō Sugai as Shūkichi
- Kuninori Kōdō as Great-Uncle
- Kazuyo Itô as Mitsuko Yabe
- Zen Murase as Minoru Mamiya
- Tomiko Nishiwaki as Tami Yamamoto
- Matsuko Shiga as Mariko Takanashi
- Isao Shirosawa as Isamu Mamiya

== Production ==
Shōhei Imamura was Ozu's assistant director on the film.

== Release ==
The film was released in Japan by Shochiku on October 3, 1951.

=== Home media ===
Criterion Collection DVD cover

In 2004, The Criterion Collection released a new, higher-definition digital transfer, with restored image and sound and new English subtitle translation. Also included were the original theatrical trailer, an audio commentary by Donald Richie, Ozu’s Films from Behind-the-Scenes, a conversation about Ozu and his working methods between child actor and sound technician Kojirō Suematsu, assistant cameraman Takashi Kawamata, and Ozu producer Shizuo Yamanouchi, and essays by David Bordwell and Jim Jarmusch.

In 2010, the BFI released a Region 2 Dual Format Edition (Blu-ray + DVD), this time in proper high definition. Included with this release is a standard-definition presentation of What Did the Lady Forget?.

== Reception ==
=== Critical response ===
Early Summer is highly regarded by critics. Rotten Tomatoes reports 100% approval among 11 critics, with an average rating of 8.90/10. In 2009, the film was ranked at No. 106 on the list of the Greatest Japanese Films of All Time by Japanese film magazine Kinema Junpo. Leonard Maltin gave it three of four stars: "A sensitively rendered film about basic human emotions, made by a master filmmaker."

David Bordwell noted the film's influence on Hirokazu Kore-eda's Still Walking (2008).

=== Awards and nominations ===
Award	Year	Category	Nominee	Result
Blue Ribbon Award	1952	Best Director	Yasujirō Ozu	Won
Blue Ribbon Award	1952	Best Actress	Setsuko Hara	Won
Blue Ribbon Award	1952	Best Supporting Actress	Haruko Sugimura	Won
Blue Ribbon Award	1952	Best Cinematography	Yûharu Atsuta	Won
Kinema Junpo Award	1952	Best Film of the Year	Yasujirō Ozu	Won
Mainichi Film Award	1952	Best Film	Yasujirō Ozu	Won
Mainichi Film Award	1952	Best Actress	Setsuko Hara	Won
