= A Hen in the Wind =

1948 film

- Directed by: Yasujirō Ozu
- Written by: Yasujirō Ozu; Ryosuke Saito
- Starring: Kinuyo Tanaka; Shūji Sano
- Cinematography: Yuuharu Atsuta
- Edited by: Yoshiyasu Hamamura
- Production company: Shochiku
- Release date: 17 September 1948
- Running time: 84 minutes
- Country: Japan
- Language: Japanese

A Hen in the Wind (風の中の牝鶏, Kaze no naka no mendori) is a 1948 Japanese drama film directed by Yasujirō Ozu, starring Kinuyo Tanaka and Shūji Sano. It was written by Ozu and Ryosuke Saito.

== Plot ==
The film is set in immediate postwar Japan, Tokyo. Tokiko Amamiya, a twenty-nine-year-old mother of a young boy of four, is waiting for her husband's repatriation from World War II. Prices are escalating, and Tokiko is renting a room in a working-class industrial district of Tokyo, making ends meet through dressmaking while selling her belongings on the side. She is supported by her long-time friend and former workmate Akiko. Orie, a local woman of leisure with ties to the sex trade, buys Tokiko's kimono and repeatedly tries to interest Tokiko in selling herself, but she has always refused.

One day, Tokiko's son Hiroshi falls ill with colitis and needs to be hospitalized. Although Hiroshi subsequently recovers, the high hospital bills force Tokiko into desperation, and she decides to talk to Orie and prostitute herself for a night at a place far out of town. When Akiko finds out about this, she chides Tokiko, and Tokiko begins to feel shame even as she explains she has no other choice.

Her husband Shuichi finally returns from the war and the couple is blissfully reunited. However, the conversation turns to Hiroshi's recent illness and Tokiko, finding it impossible to lie, comes clean with her husband over what she has done. Shuichi flies into a rage and is totally unable to concentrate on his job for the next few days. Thoughts about his wife's "misdeed" obsess him and he finds out from her exactly where the establishment is, though when she goes silent rather than answer his questions about the other man, he assaults and then rapes her.

He makes a secret visit to the place one afternoon, where he questions an attendant and learns that Tokiko went there only once. Fusako, a 21-year-old woman, is sent to service him. Shuichi is put into a contemplative mood by singing coming from the elementary school next door to the brothel, and by Fusako's story of the family that depends on the money she earns through prostitution to live. Shuichi pays and leaves without touching her. Fusako follows him outside, and after they talk, he resolves to help her find a better job.

Shuichi confides his troubles to his colleague, Satake. Satake promises to do his best to help Fusako, and advises Shuichi to forgive Tokiko and get over it, but Shuichi refuses. When he returns home, he continues abusing Tokiko, who tries desperately to placate him and apologizes repeatedly, only to be met with brutality from Shuichi, culminating in his pushing her down a flight of stairs.

Hurt, Tokiko limps back upstairs and tries again to reconcile with Shuichi; he regrets his actions and says they should put it all behind them. When he asks her to walk across the room, they realize that Shuichi's violence has injured her. They embrace each other and promise to forget everything and start anew, relying on each other for their ultimate support. Outside, Hiroshi plays happily with the neighborhood children.

== Cast ==
- Kinuyo Tanaka as Tokiko Amamiya
- Shūji Sano as Shuichi Amamiya
- Chieko Murata as Akiko Ida
- Chishū Ryū as Kazuichiro Satake
- Hohi Aoki as Shoichi
- Chiyoko Ayatani as Fusako Onada
- Reiko Mizukami as Orie Noma
- Takeshi Sakamoto as Hikozo Sakai
- Eiko Takamatsu as Tsune
- Kōji Mitsui as Hideo

== Release ==
In 2011 the BFI released a Region 2 DVD of the film as a bonus feature on its dual-format edition of An Autumn Afternoon.
