= Teiji Takahashi =

Japanese film actor (1926–1959)

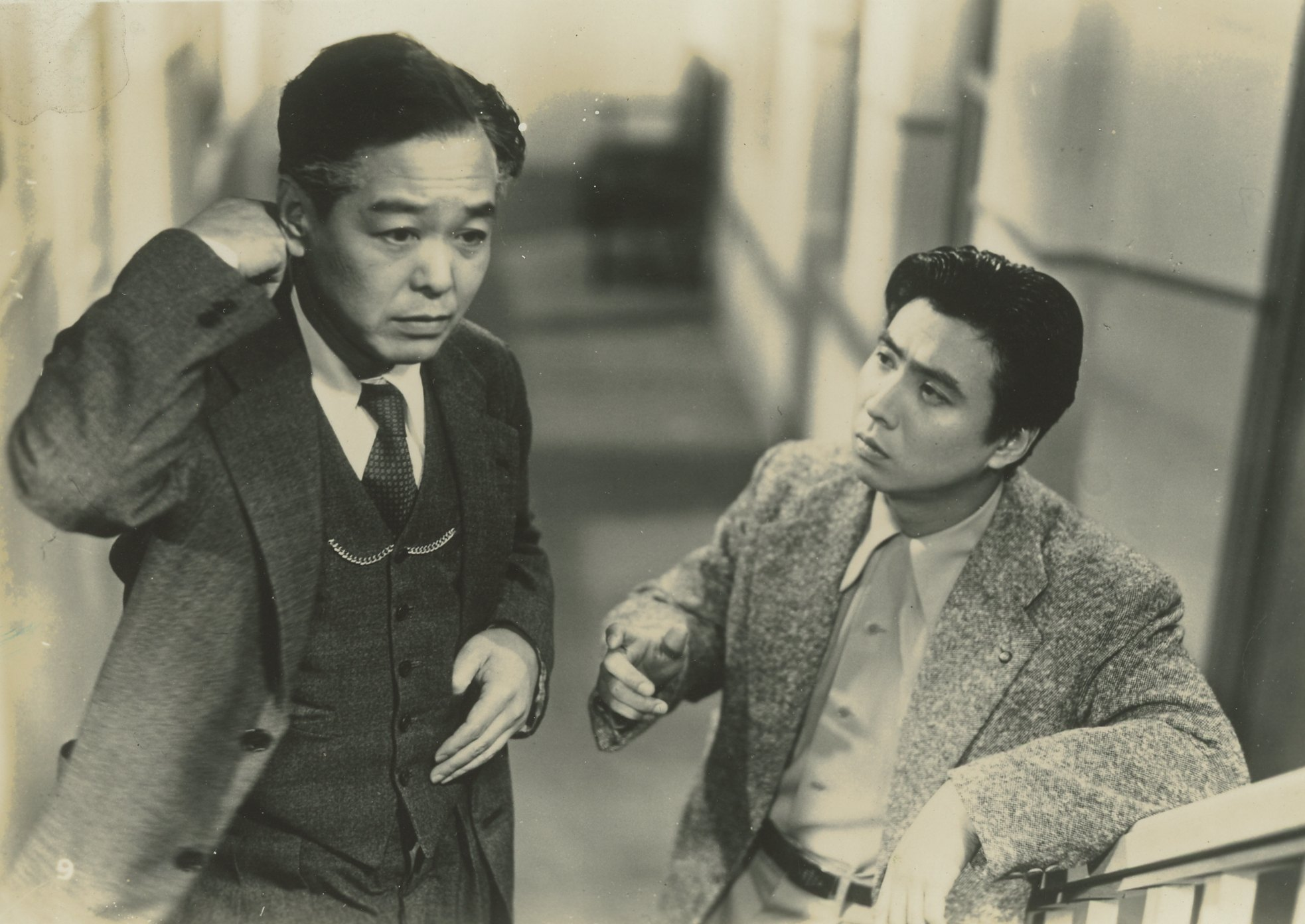
- Teiji Takahashi in 1953
- Born: 20 October 1926; Tokyo, Japan
- Died: 3 November 1959 (aged 33); Yokohama, Japan
- Occupation: Actor
- Years active: 1950–1959

Teiji Takahashi (高橋 貞二, Takahashi Teiji; 20 October 1926 – 3 November 1959) was a Japanese film actor. He appeared in more than twenty films from 1950 to 1959. Takahashi died in a traffic accident.

== Career ==
Born in Tokyo, Takahashi graduated from the Japanese Film School (Nihon Eiga Gakkō) and joined the Shochiku studio in 1945. He became one of the company's top young male stars, alongside Keiji Sada and Kōji Tsuruta.

== Selected filmography ==
Film
Year	Title	Role	Notes
1958	The Ballad of Narayama		
1958	Equinox Flower		
1957	Tokyo Twilight		
1956	Early Spring		
1956	Night School		
1953	A Japanese Tragedy		
