= Until the Day We Meet Again =

1932 film

- Directed by: Yasujirō Ozu
- Written by: Kōgo Noda
- Produced by: Shōchiku Eiga
- Starring: Yoshiko Okada
- Cinematography: Hideo Shigehara assisted by Yūharu Atsuta
- Edited by: Hideo Shigehara
- Release date: 24 November 1932
- Running time: 103 min
- Country: Japan
- Language: Silent (English intertitles)

Until the Day We Meet Again (Japanese: また逢ふ日まで, Hepburn: Mata au hi made) is a lost 1932 Japanese film. It was the first sound film directed by Yasujirō Ozu.

== Plot ==
A romance between a young soldier and a prostitute unfolds over the course of one night.

== Production ==
According to Ozu's recollections, Until the Day We Meet Again was made a year after the release of the first Japanese talkie, Madamu to nubo (The Neighbour's Wife and Mine). The director, who had initially resisted the trend towards talking pictures, agreed to use an experimental sound process developed by Hideo Mohara, rather than the more popular Dobashi sound system. The film apparently contained a musical track and sound effects but no audible dialog scenes.

== Cast ==
- Yoshiko Okada - Woman
- Joji Oka - Man
- Shin'yō Nara - Father
- Hiroko Kawasaki - Sister
- Chōko Iida - Sister
- Satoko Date - Girlfriend
- Mitsuko Yoshikawa - Another Girl
