= Tokyo Story =

1953 Japanese film by Yasujiro Ozu

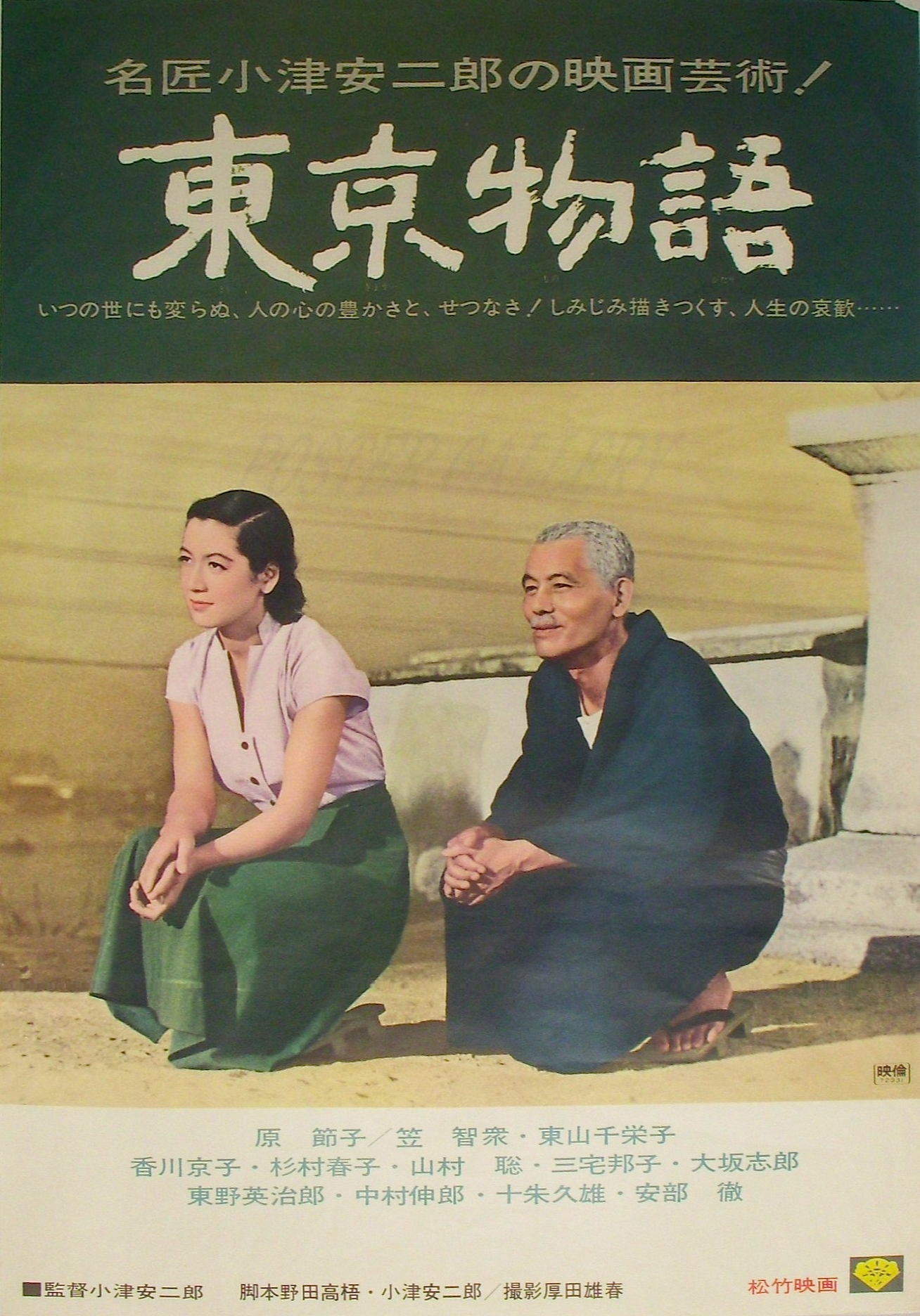
- Theatrical release poster
- Directed by: Yasujirō Ozu
- Screenplay by: Kogo Noda; Yasujirō Ozu
- Produced by: Takeshi Yamamoto
- Starring: Setsuko Hara; Chishū Ryū; Chieko Higashiyama; Kyōko Kagawa; Haruko Sugimura; So Yamamura; Kuniko Miyake; Shirō Ōsaka; Eijirō Tōno; Nobuo Nakamura; Hisao Toake; Toru Abe
- Cinematography: Yūharu Atsuta
- Edited by: Yoshiyasu Hamamura
- Music by: Takanobu Saitō
- Production company: Shochiku
- Distributed by: Shochiku
- Release date: November 3, 1953
- Running time: 136 minutes
- Country: Japan
- Language: Japanese
- Box office: ¥132 million (Japan rentals); 177,456 tickets (Europe)

Tokyo Story (Japanese: 東京物語, Hepburn: Tōkyō Monogatari) is a 1953 Japanese drama film directed by Yasujirō Ozu and starring Chishū Ryū and Chieko Higashiyama, about an aging couple who travel to Tokyo to visit their grown children.

Upon release, it did not immediately gain international recognition and was considered "too Japanese" to be marketable by Japanese film exporters. It was screened in 1957 in London, where it won the inaugural Sutherland Trophy the following year, and received praise from U.S. film critics after a 1972 screening in New York City.

Tokyo Story is widely regarded as Ozu's magnum opus and one of the greatest films in the history of cinema. It was voted the third-greatest film of all time in the 2012 edition of a worldwide poll of film experts conducted by Sight and Sound magazine.

== Plot summary ==
Retired couple Shūkichi and Tomi Hirayama live in Onomichi in western Japan with their daughter Kyōko, a primary school teacher. They have five adult children, four of whom are living in Tokyo. The couple travels to Tokyo to visit their son, daughter, and widowed daughter-in-law.

Their eldest son, Kōichi, is a physician who runs a small clinic in Tokyo's suburbs, and their eldest daughter, Shige, runs a hairdressing salon. Kōichi and Shige are both busy and do not have much time for their parents. Only their widowed daughter-in-law, Noriko, the wife of their middle son Shōji, who was missing in action and presumed dead during the Pacific War, goes out of her way to entertain them. She takes time from her demanding office job to take Shūkichi and Tomi on a sightseeing tour of metropolitan Tokyo.

Feeling conflicted that they do not have time to entertain them, Kōichi and Shige pay for their parents to stay at a hot spring spa at Atami, but they return early because the nightlife disturbs their sleep. Tomi also has an unexplained dizzy spell. Upon returning, a frustrated Shige explains she sent them to Atami because she wanted to use their bedroom for a meeting; the elderly couple has to leave for the evening. They spend the afternoon in Ueno Park before splitting up to seek accommodations for the night. Tomi goes to stay with Noriko, with whom she deepens their emotional bond, and advises her to remarry. Shūkichi, meanwhile, gets drunk with some old friends from Onomichi. The three men drunkenly ramble about their children and lives. A policeman brings Shūkichi and one of his friends to Shige's salon. Shige is outraged her father is lapsing into the alcoholic ways that overshadowed her childhood.

The couple remarks on how their children have changed, returning home earlier than planned, intending to see their younger son Keizō when the train stops in Osaka. However, Tomi suddenly becomes ill during the journey and they decide to disembark the train, staying until she feels better the next day. They return to Onomichi, and Tomi falls critically ill. Kōichi, Shige, and Noriko rush to Onomichi to see Tomi, who dies shortly afterwards. Keizō arrives too late, as he has been away on business.

After the funeral, Kōichi, Shige, and Keizō leave immediately; only Noriko remains. After they leave, Kyōko criticises her siblings over their selfishness toward their parents. She believes that Kōichi, Shige, and Keizō do not care how hard it will be for their father now that he has lost their mother. She is also upset at Shige for asking so quickly for Tomi's clothes as keepsakes. Noriko responds that while she understands Kyōko's disappointment, everyone has their own life and the growing chasm between parents and children is inevitable. She convinces Kyōko not to be too hard on her siblings because one day she will understand how hard it is to take time away from one's own life.

After Kyōko leaves for school, Noriko informs her father-in-law that she must return to Tokyo that afternoon. Shūkichi tells her that she has treated them better than their own children despite not being a blood relation. Noriko protests that she is selfish and has not always thought about her missing husband, and Shūkichi credits her self-assessment to humility. He gives her a watch from the late Tomi as a memento. Noriko cries and confesses her loneliness and Shūkichi encourages her to remarry. Noriko travels from Onomichi back to Tokyo, contemplating the watch, while Shūkichi remains behind, resigned to the solitude he must endure.

=== Hirayama family tree ===
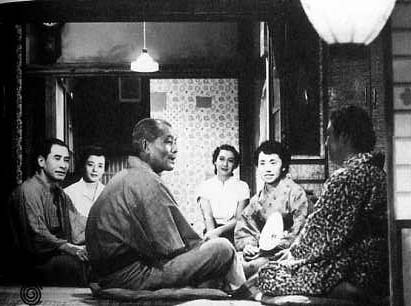
From left to right: Kōichi (So Yamamura), Fumiko (Kuniko Miyake), Shūkichi (Chishū Ryū), Noriko (Setsuko Hara), Shige (Haruko Sugimura) and Tomi (Chieko Higashiyama)

Shūkichi (husband)	Tomi (wife)
Kōichi (eldest son)	Fumiko (daughter-in-law)	Kurazō Kaneko (son-in-law)	Shige Kaneko (eldest daughter)	Shōji (second son) deceased	Noriko (daughter-in-law)	Keizō (youngest son)	Kyōko (youngest daughter)
Minoru (grandson)	Isamu (grandson)

== Cast ==
- Setsuko Hara as Noriko Hirayama (平山 紀子, Hirayama Noriko)
- Chishū Ryū as Shūkichi Hirayama (平山 周吉, Hirayama Shukichi)
- Chieko Higashiyama as Tomi Hirayama (平山 とみ, Hirayama Tomi)
- Haruko Sugimura as Shige Kaneko (金子 志げ, Kaneko Shige)
- So Yamamura as Kōichi Hirayama (平山 幸一, Hirayama Koichi)
- Kuniko Miyake as Fumiko Hirayama (平山 文子, Hirayama Fumiko)
- Kyōko Kagawa as Kyōko Hirayama (平山 京子, Hirayama Kyoko)
- Eijirō Tōno as Sanpei Numata (沼田 三平, Numata Sanpei)
- Nobuo Nakamura as Kurazō Kaneko (金子 庫造, Kaneko Kurazo)
- Shirō Ōsaka as Keizō Hirayama (平山 敬三, Hirayama Keizo)
- Hisao Toake as Osamu Hattori (服部 修, Hattori Osamu)
- Teruko Nagaoka as Yone Hattori (服部 よね, Hattori Yone)
- Mutsuko Sakura as a patron of the Oden Restaurant
- Toyo Takahashi as Shūkichi Hirayama's neighbour
- Toru Abe as a railway employee
- Sachiko Mitani as Noriko's neighbour
- Zen Murase as Minoru Hirayama, Kōichi's son
- Mitsuhiro Mori as Isamu Hirayama, Kōichi's son
- Junko Anami as a beauty salon assistant
- Ryōko Mizuki as a beauty salon client
- Yoshiko Togawa as a beauty salon client
- Kazuhiro Itokawa as a student
- Keijirō Morozumi as a police agent
- Tsutomu Nijima as Noriko's office boss
- Shōzō Suzuki as Noriko's office colleague
- Yoshiko Tashiro as a hotel maid
- Haruko Chichibu as a hotel maid
- Takashi Miki as a singer
- Binnosuke Nagao as the doctor at Onomichi

== Production ==
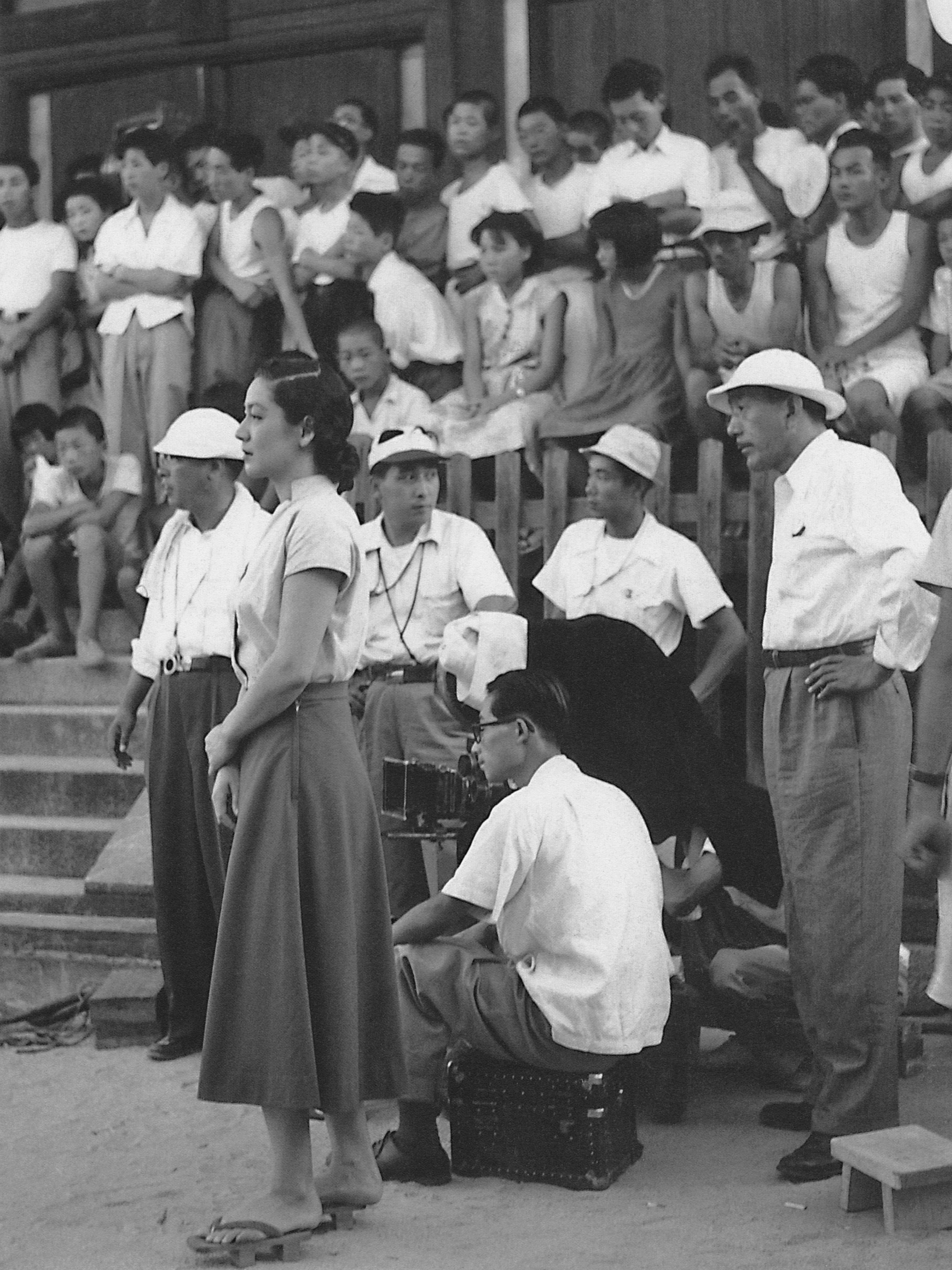
Ozu (far right) on set during shooting.

Tokyo Story was inspired by the 1937 American film Make Way for Tomorrow, directed by Leo McCarey, which it loosely adapts to the Japanese context and Ozu’s style. Noda, a long-time collaborator of Ozu, initially suggested the plot of the older film to Ozu, who had not seen it. Noda remembered it from its initial release in Japan. Both films depict an elderly couple, their problems with family and travelling to visit their children. Differences include the older film taking place in Depression-era US, with the couple's problem being economical and Tokyo Story taking place in post-war Japan, where the problems are cultural and emotional. The films end differently. David Bordwell wrote that Ozu "re-cast" the original film instead of adapting it.

The script was developed by Ozu and Noda over a period of 103 days in a ryokan called Chigasakikan in Chigasaki, Kanagawa. Ozu, Noda and cinematographer Yūharu Atsuta scouted locations in Tokyo and Onomichi for another month before shooting started. Shooting and editing took place from July to October 1953. Filming locations were in Tokyo (Adachi, Chūō, Taitō and Chiyoda), Onomichi, Atami and Osaka. Among the major cast members only Ryū, Hara and Kagawa participated in the Onomichi location. All indoor scenes, except those at the Tokyo Station waiting area and in a passenger car, were shot at the Shochiku Ōfuna Studio in Kamakura, Kanagawa. Ozu used the same film crew and actors he had worked with for many years. Actor Chishū Ryū said Ozu was always happiest when finishing the final draft of a script and there were never any changes to the final draft.

== Style and themes ==
Like all of Ozu's sound films, Tokyo Story's pacing is slow, though Ozu called it his film "that tends most strongly to melodrama." In his narrative storytelling, Ozu often had certain key scenes take place off camera, with the viewer only learning about them through the characters' dialogue. For example, the train journeys to and from Tokyo are not depicted, the audience never sees Shūkichi and Tomi visit their son Keizō, and Tomi's illness begins off-screen.

Ozu favored a stationary camera and believed strongly in minimalism. A distinctive camera style is used, in which the camera height is low and almost never moves; film critic Roger Ebert noted that the camera moves once in the film, which is "more than usual" for an Ozu film. The low camera positions are reminiscent of sitting on a traditional Japanese tatami mat. Ozu rarely shot master shots and often broke the 180-degree rule of filmmaking and screen direction. Characters, who often sit side by side in scenes, often appear to be facing the same direction when speaking to each other, such as in the first scene with Shūkichi and Tomi. During some transitions, characters exit a scene screen right and then enter the next scene screen right.

David Desser has compared the film's style and "de-emphasized plot" to Zen Buddhism and the modern world's fascination with surface value and materialism. Many of the transitional shots are still lifes of non-human subjects, such as smokestacks and landscapes.

Themes in the film include the break-up and Westernization of the traditional Japanese family after World War II and the inevitability of children growing apart from their parents. It contrasts the urban life of the children in Tokyo with the rural life of their parents. The film takes place in 1953 post-war Japan, a few years after the new Civil Code of 1948 stimulated the country's rapid re-growth and embraced Western capitalist ideals, while simultaneously destroying older traditions such as the Japanese family and its values. Ozu was very close to his own mother, living with her as a surrogate wife and never marrying. It is considered a Shomin-geki film for its depiction of ordinary people.

== Release and reception ==
Tokyo Story was released on November 3, 1953, in Japan. The following year Haruko Sugimura won the Mainichi Film Award for Best Supporting Actress for her role as the eldest daughter Shige.

It was screened at the National Film Theatre in London in 1957. It is Ozu's best known film in both the East and the West. After the success of Akira Kurosawa's Rashomon at the 1951 Venice Film Festival, Japanese films began getting international distribution. However, Japanese film exporters considered Ozu's work "too Japanese" and unmarketable. It was not until the 1960s that Ozu's films began to be screened in New York City at film festivals, museums, and theaters.

In 1958, it was awarded the first Sutherland Trophy for the most original and creative film. UK critic Lindsay Anderson wrote that "It is a film about relationships, a film about time, and how it affects human beings (particularly parents and children) and how we must reconcile ourselves to its workings."

After a screening at the New Yorker Theatre in 1972, it received rave reviews from prominent critics who were unfamiliar with the film or Ozu. Charles Micherer of Newsweek said it was "like a Japanese paper flower that is dropped into water and then swells to fill the entire container with its beauty." Stanley Kauffmann put it on his 10 Best list of 1972 and wrote "Ozu, a lyrical poet, whose lyrics swell quietly into the epic."

=== Box office ===
In Japan, it was the eighth-highest-grossing film of 1953 with ¥131.65 million in distributor rental earnings. In France, the film sold 84,646 tickets upon release in 1978. In other European countries, the film sold 92,810 tickets between 1996 and 2021, for a combined 177,456 tickets sold in Europe.

=== Critical reception ===
On the review aggregator website Rotten Tomatoes, 100% of 49 critics' reviews are positive, with an average rating of 9.7/10. The website's consensus reads: "Tokyo Story is a Yasujiro Ozu masterpiece whose rewarding complexity has lost none of its power more than half a century on." Metacritic, which uses a weighted average, assigned the film a score of 100 out of 100, based on 19 critics, indicating "universal acclaim". It is also jointly ranked #1 on Metacritic's Filtered "Best Movies of All Time". John Walker, former editor of the Halliwell's Film Guides, places Tokyo Story at the top of his published list of the best 1000 films ever made. Tokyo Story is also included in film critic Derek Malcolm's The Century of Films, a list of films which he deems artistically or culturally important, and Time magazine lists it among its All-Time 100 Movies. Roger Ebert of the Chicago Sun-Times included it in his series of great movies, and Paul Schrader placed it in the "Gold" section of his Film Canon. Martin Scorsese included it on a list of "39 Essential Foreign Films for a Young Filmmaker."

Arthur Nolletti Jr, writing an essay in the book titled Ozu's Tokyo Story, compared the film to its USA predecessor film, McCarey's 1937 Make Way for Tomorrow, and indicated that: "David Bordwell sees Ozu as 'recasting' the American film – borrowing from it, adapting it – and briefly mentions that there are similarities in story, theme and plot structure. Indeed these similarities are striking. Both films focus on an elderly couple who discover that their grown children regard them as a burden; both films are structured as journeys in which the couple are shuffled from one household to another; both films explore much of the same thematic material (e.g., sibling self-centeredness and parental disillusionment); and both films are about the human condition – the cyclical pattern of life with its concomitant joys and sorrows – and the immediate social realities that affect and shape that condition: in McCarey's film, The Great Depression; in Ozu's, the intensified postwar push toward industrialization. Primarily sober in tone but possessing rich and gentle humor, both films belong to a genre that in Japanese cinema is called shomin-geki, films dealing with the everyday lives of the lower middle classes."

Tokyo Story is often admired as a work that achieves great emotional effect while avoiding melodrama. Critic Wally Hammond stated that "the way Ozu builds up emotional empathy for a sense of disappointment in its various characters is where his mastery lies." Roger Ebert wrote that the work "lacks sentimental triggers and contrived emotion; it looks away from moments a lesser movie would have exploited. It doesn't want to force our emotions, but to share its understanding." In The Village Voice, Eric Hynes argued that "time itself is [Ozu]'s most potent weapon. Protracted sequences make you impatient for forward motion, but then, in an instant, you’re left to mourn beauties hastened away." In 2010, David Thomson rhetorically asked whether any other family drama in cinematic history was more moving than Tokyo Story. Ebert called Ozu "universal", reported having never heard more weeping in an audience than during its showing, and later stated that the work "ennobles the cinema. It says, yes, a movie can help us make small steps against our imperfections." Leonard Maltin gave it four of four stars: "Quietly powerful story of old age, the disappointments parents experience with their children, and the fears the young have of time passing. A masterpiece." The Village Voice ranked the film at number 36 in its Top 250 "Best Films of the Century" list in 1999, based on a poll of critics.

Tokyo Story was voted at No. 14 on the list of "100 Greatest Films" by the prominent French magazine Cahiers du Cinéma in 2008. In 2009 the film was named The Greatest Japanese Film of All Time by Japanese film magazine Kinema Junpo. Entertainment Weekly voted it the 95th Greatest film of all time. Since 1992, the film has appeared consistently in the British Film Institute's "polls of the greatest films" of directors and critics published in Sight and Sound. On the critics' poll, it was third in 1992, fifth in 2002, and third again in 2012. On the directors' poll, it was 17th in 1992, tied at number 16 with Psycho and The Mirror in 2002, and in 2012 it topped the poll, receiving 48 votes out of the 358 directors polled. In 2022, it was fourth in both the critics' and directors' polls. In 2010, The Guardian ranked the film fourth in its list of 25 greatest arthouse films. It ranked third in BBC's 2018 list of The 100 greatest foreign language films voted by 209 film critics from 43 countries around the world.

== Influence ==
German director Doris Dörrie drew inspiration from Tokyo Story for her 2008 film Cherry Blossoms, which follows a similar storyline.

In 2013, Yōji Yamada remade the film as Tōkyō Kazoku.

== Home media ==
The film was restored and released on DVD and Blu-ray by The Criterion Collection (Region 1) and by Tartan Video in Region 2. In 2010, the BFI released a Region 2 dual-format edition (Blu-ray + DVD). Included with this release is a standard-definition presentation of Brothers and Sisters of the Toda Family.

== Bibliography ==
- Bordwell, David & Thompson, Kristin (2003). Film History: An Introduction (2nd ed.). McGraw-Hill. ISBN 9780070384293.
- Desser, David, ed. (1997). Ozu's Tokyo Story. Cambridge, UK: Cambridge University Press. ISBN 0-521-48435-9. Archived from the original on April 13, 2020.
- Desser, David (2005). "The Space of Ambivalence". In Geiger, Jeffrey (ed.). Film Analysis. Norton.
- Eleftheriotis, Dimitris & Needham, Gary (May 2006). Asian Cinemas: A Reader and Guide. University of Hawai'i Press. ISBN 978-0-8248-3085-4.
