= Tokyo Twilight =

1957 Japanese film by Yasujirō Ozu

- Directed by: Yasujirō Ozu
- Written by: Yasujirō Ozu; Kōgo Noda
- Starring: Ineko Arima; Setsuko Hara; Isuzu Yamada; Chishū Ryū; Kamatari Fujiwara; Nobuo Nakamura; Haruko Sugimura
- Cinematography: Yuuharu Atsuta
- Edited by: Yoshiyasu Hamamura
- Music by: Kojun Saitō
- Distributed by: Shochiku
- Release date: April 30, 1957
- Running time: 140 min.
- Country: Japan
- Language: Japanese

Tokyo Twilight (東京暮色, Tōkyō boshoku) is a 1957 Japanese drama film by Yasujirō Ozu starring Ineko Arima and Setsuko Hara. It was written by Ozu and Kōgo Noda, and is Ozu's last film shot in black and white.

It is the story of two sisters who are reunited with a mother who left them as children.

== Synopsis ==
Akiko Sugiyama is a college student learning English shorthand. Her elder sister Takako, running away from an unhappy marriage, has returned home to stay with Akiko and their father Shukichi in Tokyo, together with her toddler girl. Shukichi works in a bank in Tokyo. Akiko has a relationship with her college boyfriend Kenji, which results in an unwanted pregnancy. Later, Akiko has an abortion, after an encounter in which she realizes that her boyfriend does not love her.

While going to a mahjong parlour to look for Kenji, Akiko comes across its proprietress Kisako, who seems to know a lot about her family. Back at home, Takako hears about Kisako from Akiko, and pieces together the fact that she is their long-lost mother. Takako visits the parlour to ask Kisako not to reveal to Akiko who she really is – but the plan backfires. Akiko learns of her visit and goes to confront Takako. Takako then discloses to her that Kisako is their mother, who ran away with another man when Akiko was still a toddler. Shaken, Akiko goes to confront Kisako to ask if she is the daughter of her father. She leaves in a huff, upset by Kisako abandoning her as a child, then goes to a Chinese noodle shop for some sake. Her boyfriend Kenji enters, and the two have an argument. Akiko leaves angrily, and she is hit by a train at an intersection just outside the shop.

Akiko is badly injured, and she expresses the wish to live and start life over again in the presence of her father and sister. In the next scene, however, in one of Ozu's famous ellipses, a bitter Takako goes to visit her mother to tell her the news of Akiko's death. Kisako is distraught, and agrees with her husband that she will leave Tokyo for his new job in Hokkaido. Just prior to their departure, she goes to the Sugiyamas to offer her condolences, and to tell Takako of her decision. Takako does not go to send her off at the railway station.

In the last scene of the film, Takako reveals to her father that she is going back to her husband to try to make their marriage work again. She does not want her daughter to have the same experience as Akiko, who grew up without knowing one of her parents. Shukichi agrees with her decision.

== Cast ==
| Actor | Role |
|---|---|
| Ineko Arima | Akiko Sugiyama |
| Setsuko Hara | Takako Numata, Akiko's elder sister |
| Chishū Ryū | Shukichi Sugiyama, the Sugiyama patriarch |
| Isuzu Yamada | Kisako Soma |
| Haruko Sugimura | Shigeko Takeuchi, Shukichi's sister |
| Nobuo Nakamura | Sakae Soma, Kisako's new husband |
| Kamatari Fujiwara | noodle restaurant proprietor |
| Kinzō Shin | Yasuo Numata, Takako's estranged husband |
| Teiji Takahashi | Noburo Kawaguchi |
| So Yamamura | Shukichi's friend |
| Seiji Miyaguchi | Policeman |
| Tsûsai Sugawara | mahjong parlor owner |

== Reception ==
Several reviewers consider Tokyo Twilight to be one of the director's bleakest works. While rarely screened, it has a 100% on Rotten Tomatoes with an average rating of 8.0/10.

In The New Yorker, Richard Brody argued: "This turbulent and grim family melodrama, from 1957, is steered away from the maudlin and given emotional depth and philosophical heft under the direction of Yasujiro Ozu." Fred Camper of the Chicago Reader declared it one of the director's best works, and wrote: "The father and elder daughter try to meet the world with a gaze as steady as that of Ozu's static camera, ultimately resigning themselves to accepting tragedy, which is presented as inevitable in the flow of life." Leonard Maltin gave it three and a half of four stars: "An aura of profound sadness permeates this quietly devastating account of the secrets and lies that eat away at the core of an otherwise average Japanese family."

In 2009, the film was ranked at No. 106 on the list of the Greatest Japanese Films of All Time by Japanese film magazine kinema Junpo.

== Home media ==
In 2007, The Criterion Collection released the film as part of the DVD box set Eclipse Series 3: Late Ozu.
