= Yasujirō Ozu =

Japanese filmmaker (1903–1963)

- 小津 安二郎
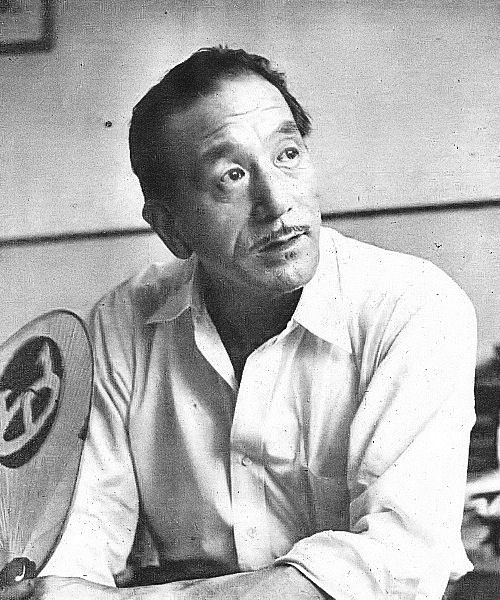
- Ozu in 1951
- Born: 12 December 1903; Fukagawa, Tokyo City, Empire of Japan
- Died: 12 December 1963 (aged 60); Bunkyō City, Tokyo, Japan
- Resting place: Engaku-ji, Kamakura, Japan
- Other name: James Maki
- Occupations: Film director; screenwriter
- Years active: 1929–1963
- Movement: Shomin-geki

Japanese name
- Hiragana: おづ やすじろう
- Katakana: オヅ ヤスジロウ
Transcriptions
- Romanization: Ozu Yasujirō

Yasujirō Ozu (小津 安二郎, Ozu Yasujirō; 12 December 1903 – 12 December 1963) was a Japanese filmmaker. He began his career during the era of silent films, and his last films were made in colour in the early 1960s. Ozu first made a number of short comedies, before turning to more serious themes in the 1930s. The most prominent themes of Ozu's work are family and marriage, and especially the relationships between generations. His most widely beloved films include Late Spring (1949), Tokyo Story (1953) and An Autumn Afternoon (1962).

Widely regarded as one of the world's greatest and most influential filmmakers, Ozu's work has continued to receive acclaim since his death. In the 2012 Sight & Sound poll, Ozu's Tokyo Story was voted the third-greatest film of all time by critics world-wide. In the same poll, Tokyo Story was voted the greatest film of all time by 358 directors and film-makers world-wide. He is the subject of several documentaries, including Wim Wenders's Tokyo-Ga (1985) and Daniel Raim's The Ozu Diaries (2025).

== Biography ==
=== Early life ===
Ozu was born in the Fukagawa district of Tokyo, the second son of merchant Toranosuke Ozu and his wife Asae. His family was a branch of the Ozu Yoemon merchant family from Ise, and Toranosuke was the 5th generation manager of the family's fertilizer business in Nihonbashi. Asae came from the Nakajō merchant family. Ozu had five brothers and sisters. When he was three, he developed meningitis, and was in a coma for a couple of days. Asae devoted herself to nursing him, and Ozu made a recovery. He attended Meiji nursery school and primary school. In March 1913, he and his siblings were sent by his father to live in his father's home town of Matsusaka in Mie Prefecture, where he remained until 1924. In March 1916, at the age of 12, he entered what is now Ujiyamada High School. (Note: 宇治山田高等学校) He was a boarder at the school and did judo. He frequently skipped classes to watch films such as Quo Vadis or The Last Days of Pompeii. In 1917, he saw the film Civilization and decided that he wanted to be a film director.

In 1920, at the age of 17, he was thrown out of the dormitory after being accused of writing a love letter to a good-looking boy in a lower class, and had to commute to school by train.

In March 1921, Ozu graduated from the high school. He attempted the exam for entrance into what is now Kobe University's economics department, (Note: 神戸高商, Kobe Kosho) but failed. In 1922, he took the exam for a teacher training college, (Note: 三重県立師範学校, Mie-ken ritsu shihan gakko) but failed it too. On 31 March 1922, he began working as a substitute teacher at a school in Mie prefecture. He is said to have traveled the long journey from the school in the mountains to watch films on the weekend. In December 1922, his family, with the exception of Ozu and his sister, moved back to Tokyo to live with his father. In March 1923, when his sister graduated, he also returned to live in Tokyo.

=== Entering the film business ===
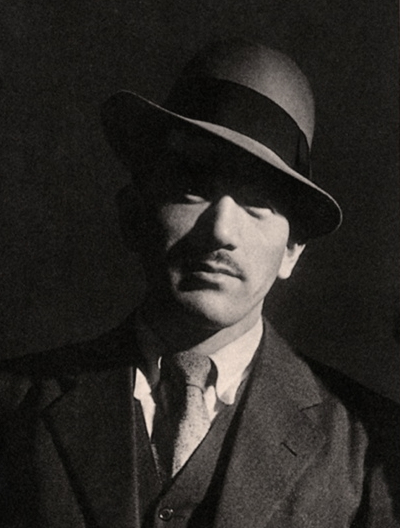
Yasujiro Ozu during the filming of Dragnet Girl 1933

With his uncle acting as intermediary, Ozu was hired by the Shochiku Film Company, as an assistant in the cinematography department, on 1 August 1923, against the wishes of his father. His family home was destroyed in the earthquake of 1923, but no members of his family were injured.

On 12 December 1924, Ozu started a year of military service. (Note: Ozu's military service was of a special type called ichinen shiganhei (一年志願兵) where the usual two-year term of conscription was shortened to one year on condition that the conscriptee paid for himself.) He finished his military service on 30 November 1925, leaving as a corporal.

In 1926, he became a third assistant director at Shochiku. In 1927, he was involved in a fracas where he punched another employee for jumping a queue at the studio cafeteria, and when called to the studio director's office, used it as an opportunity to present a film script he had written. In September 1927, he was promoted to director in the jidaigeki (period film) department, and directed his first film, Sword of Penitence, which has since been lost. Sword of Penitence was written by Ozu, with a screenplay by Kogo Noda, who would become his co-writer for the rest of his career. On September 25, he was called up for service in the military reserves until November, which meant that the film had to be partly finished by another director.

A Straightforward Boy (1929), an early short film directed by Ozu

In 1928, Shiro Kido, the head of the Shochiku studio, decided that the company would concentrate on making short comedy films without star actors. Ozu made many of these films. Body Beautiful, released on 1 December 1928, was the first Ozu film to use a low camera position, which would become his trademark. After a series of the "no star" pictures, in September 1929, I Graduated, But..., starring Minoru Takada and Kinuyo Tanaka, was released. In January 1930, he was entrusted with Shochiku's top star, Sumiko Kurishima, in her new year film, An Introduction to Marriage. His subsequent films of 1930 impressed Shiro Kido enough to invite Ozu on a trip to a hot spring. In his early works, Ozu used the pseudonym "James Maki" (Note: ヂェームス・槇) for his screenwriting credit. His film Young Miss, with an all-star cast, was the first time he used the pen name James Maki, and was also his first film to appear in film magazine Kinema Jumpo's "Best Ten" at third position.

In 1932, his I Was Born, But..., a comedy about childhood with serious overtones, won wide acclaim as the first notable work of social criticism in Japanese cinema. In 1935, Ozu made a short documentary with a soundtrack: Kagami Jishi, in which Kikugoro VI performed a Kabuki dance of the same title. This was made by request of the Ministry of Education. Like the rest of Japan's cinema industry, Ozu was slow to switch to the production of talkies: his first film with a dialogue sound-track was The Only Son in 1936, five years after Japan's first talking film, Heinosuke Gosho's The Neighbor's Wife and Mine.

=== Wartime ===
On 9 September 1937, at a time when Shochiku was unhappy about Ozu's lack of box-office success, despite the praise he received from critics, the thirty-three-year-old Ozu was conscripted into the Imperial Japanese Army. He spent two years in China in the Second Sino-Japanese War. He arrived in Shanghai on 27 September 1937 as part of an infantry regiment which handled chemical weapons. He started as a corporal, but was promoted to sergeant on 1 June 1938. From January until September 1938, he was stationed in Nanjing, where he met Sadao Yamanaka, who was stationed nearby. In September, Yamanaka died of illness. In 1939, Ozu was dispatched to Hankou, where he fought in the Battle of Nanchang and the Battle of Xiushui River. In June, he was ordered back to Japan, arriving in Kobe in July, and his conscription ended on 16 July 1939.

Some of Ozu's published diaries cover his wartime experiences between 20 December 1938 and 5 June 1939. Another diary from his wartime years (陣中日記) he expressly forbade from publication. In the published diaries, references are made to his group's participation in chemical warfare (in violation of the Geneva Protocol, though Japan had withdrawn from the League of Nations in 1933) in various entries from March 1939. The much-quoted passage comparing Chinese soldiers to insects appears not in the diaries but in an interview, "Ozu Yasujirō senjō-dan," published in Tairiku (September 1939) shortly after his return to Japan. Although operating as a military squad leader, Ozu retains his directorial perspective, once commenting that the initial shock and subsequent agony of a man as he is hacked to death is very much like its depiction in period films.

Ozu's writings also offers a glimpse into the Japanese military's use of comfort women. In a letter sent to friends in Japan on 11 April 1938, from Dingyuan County in China's Anhui Province, Ozu writes about the comfort station protocol in lightly coded terms. In a 13 January 1939 diary entry, Ozu writes more openly about his group's upcoming turn for use of a comfort station near Yingcheng. He mentions that two tickets, ointment and prophylactics are provided, and that three Korean and twelve Chinese women were being held at the comfort station for their use. Comfort station rates and schedules are also given by Ozu.

In 1939, he wrote the first draft of the script for The Flavor of Green Tea over Rice, but shelved it due to extensive changes insisted on by military censors. The first film Ozu made on his return was the critically and commercially successful Brothers and Sisters of the Toda Family, released in 1941. He followed this with There Was a Father (Chichi Ariki, 1942), which explored the strong bonds of affection between a father and son despite years of separation.

In 1943, Ozu was again drafted into the army for the purpose of making a propaganda film in Burma. However, he was sent to Singapore instead, to make a documentary Derii e, Derii e ("To Delhi, to Delhi") about Chandra Bose. During his time in Singapore, having little inclination to work, he spent an entire year reading, playing tennis and watching American films provided by the Army information corps. He was particularly impressed with Orson Welles's Citizen Kane. He occupied a fifth-floor room facing the sea in the Cathay Building where he entertained guests, drew pictures, and collected rugs. At the end of the Second World War, in August 1945, Ozu destroyed the script and all footage of the film. He was detained as a civilian, and worked in a rubber plantation. Of his film team of 32 people, there was only space for 28 on the first repatriation boat to Japan. Ozu won a lottery giving him a place, but gave it to someone else who was anxious to return.

=== Postwar ===
When the war ended, Ozu eliminated every trace of his propaganda filming, determined not to be remembered as a war criminal.

Ozu returned to Japan in February 1946, and moved back in with his mother, who had been staying with his sister in Noda in Chiba prefecture. He reported for work at the Ofuna studios on 18 February 1946. His first film released after the war was Record of a Tenement Gentleman in 1947. Around this time, the Chigasakikan (Note: 茅ケ崎館) Ryokan became Ozu's favoured location for scriptwriting.

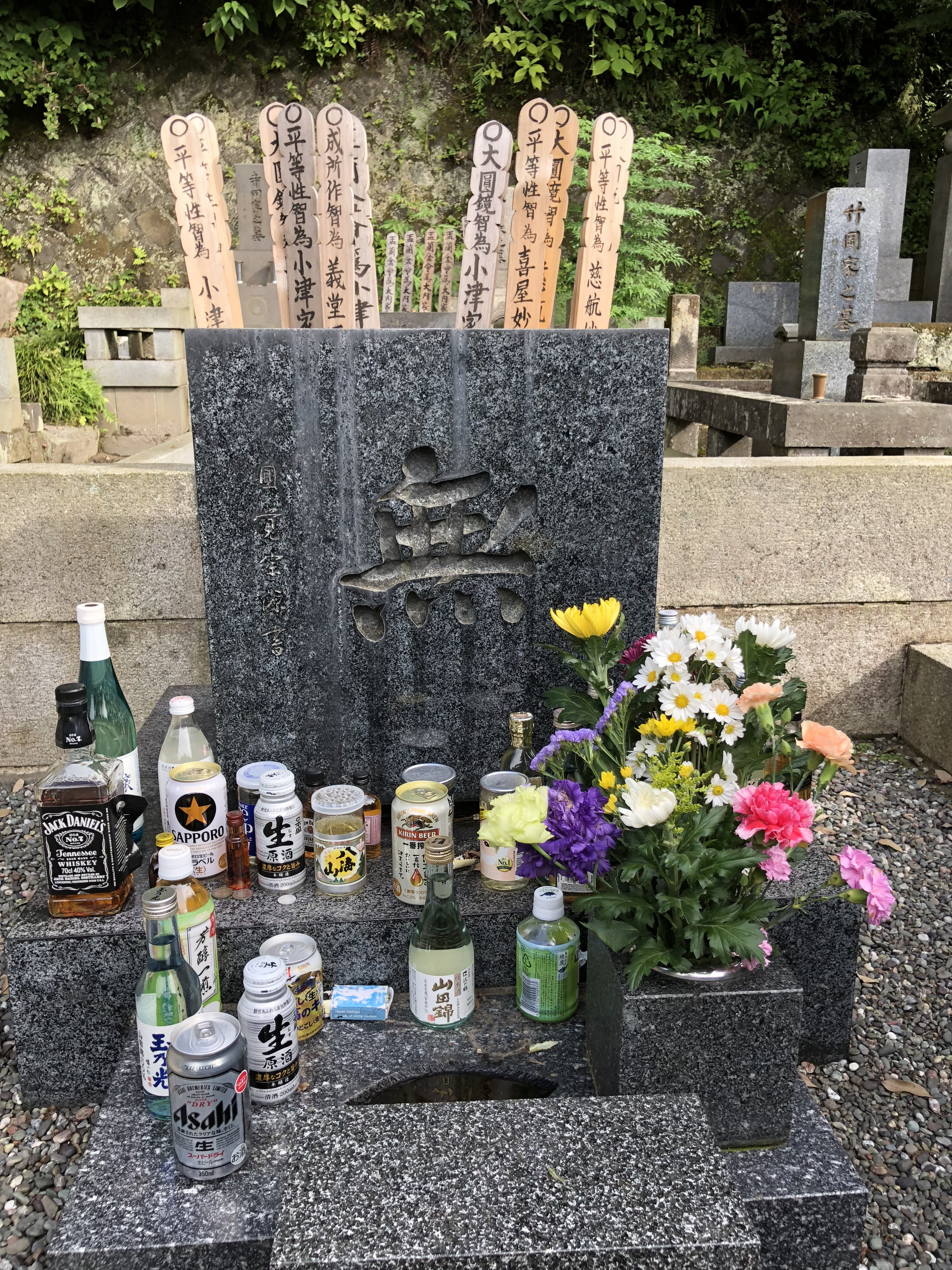
Ozu's grave at Engaku-ji, Kamakura in 2018

Tokyo Story was the last script that Ozu wrote at Chigasakikan. In later years, Ozu and Noda used a small house in the mountains at Tateshina in Nagano Prefecture called Unkosō (Note: 雲呼荘) to write scripts, with Ozu staying in a nearby house called Mugeisō. (Note: 無芸荘)

Ozu's films from the late 1940s onward were favourably received, and the entries in the so-called "Noriko trilogy" (starring Setsuko Hara) of Late Spring (1949), Early Summer (1951) and Tokyo Story (1953) are among his most acclaimed works, with Tokyo Story widely considered his masterpiece. Late Spring was the beginning of Ozu's commercial success and the development of his cinematography and storytelling style. These three films were followed by his first colour film, Equinox Flower, in 1958, Floating Weeds in 1959 and Late Autumn in 1960. In addition to Noda, other regular collaborators included cinematographer Yuharu Atsuta, along with the actors Chishū Ryū, Setsuko Hara and Haruko Sugimura.

His work was only rarely shown overseas before the 1960s; however, Tokyo Story gained recognition after winning the Sutherland Trophy at the 1958 London Film Festival. Ozu's last film, An Autumn Afternoon, was released in 1962. He then directed the television drama After the End of Youth (1963), co-writing it with novelist Ton Satomi.

He served as president of the Directors Guild of Japan from 1955 until his death in 1963. In 1959 he became the first recipient from the field of cinema to win the Japan Art Academy Prize.

Ozu was known for his drinking. He and Noda measured the progression of their scripts by how many bottles of sake they had drunk. Ozu never married. He lived with his mother until she died in 1961.

A heavy smoker, Ozu died of throat cancer in 1963 on his sixtieth birthday. The grave he shares with his mother at Engaku-ji in Kamakura bears no name—just the character mu ("nothingness").

== Filmography ==
Filmography of Yasujirō Ozu
| Year | English title | Japanese title | Rōmaji | Notes |
|---|---|---|---|---|
Silent films
| 1927 | Sword of Penitence | 懺悔の刃 | Zange no yaiba | Lost |
| 1928 | Dreams of Youth | 若人の夢 | Wakōdo no yume | Lost |
| 1928 | Wife Lost | 女房紛失 | Nyōbō funshitsu | Lost |
| 1928 | Pumpkin | カボチャ | Kabocha | Lost |
| 1928 | A Couple on the Move | 引越し夫婦 | Hikkoshi fūfu | Lost |
| 1928 | Body Beautiful | 肉体美 | Nikutaibi | Lost |
| 1929 | Treasure Mountain | 宝の山 | Takara no yama | Lost |
| 1929 | Student Romance: Days of Youth | 学生ロマンス 若き日 | Gakusei romansu: wakaki hi | Ozu's earliest surviving film |
| 1929 | Fighting Friends Japanese Style | 和製喧嘩友達 | Wasei kenka tomodachi | 14 minutes survives |
| 1929 | I Graduated, But... | 大学は出たけれど | Daigaku wa detakeredo | 10 minutes survives |
| 1929 | The Life of an Office Worker | 会社員生活 | Kaishain seikatsu | Lost |
| 1929 | A Straightforward Boy | 突貫小僧 | Tokkan kozō | Short film |
| 1930 | An Introduction to Marriage | 結婚学入門 | Kekkongaku nyūmon | Lost |
| 1930 | Walk Cheerfully | 朗かに歩め | Hogaraka ni ayume | |
| 1930 | I Flunked, But... | 落第はしたけれど | Rakudai wa shitakeredo | |
| 1930 | That Night's Wife | その夜の妻 | Sono yo no tsuma | |
| 1930 | The Revengeful Spirit of Eros | エロ神の怨霊 | Erogami no onryō | Lost |
| 1930 | The Luck Which Touched the Leg | 足に触った幸運 | Ashi ni sawatta kōun | Lost |
| 1930 | Young Miss | お嬢さん | Young Miss Ojōsan | Lost |
| 1931 | The Lady and the Beard | 淑女と髯 | Shukujo to hige | |
| 1931 | Beauty's Sorrows | 美人哀愁 | Bijin aishu | Lost |
| 1931 | Tokyo Chorus | 東京の合唱 | Tōkyō no kōrasu | |
| 1932 | Spring Comes from the Ladies | 春は御婦人から | Haru wa gofujin kara | Lost |
| 1932 | I Was Born, But... | 大人の見る繪本 生れてはみたけれど | Otona no miru ehon — Umarete wa mita keredo | |
| 1932 | Where Now Are the Dreams of Youth? | 靑春の夢いまいづこ | Seishun no yume ima izuko | |
| 1932 | Until the Day We Meet Again | また逢ふ日まで | Mata au hi made | Lost |
| 1933 | Woman of Tokyo | 東京の女 | Tōkyō no onna | |
| 1933 | Dragnet Girl | 非常線の女 | Hijōsen no onna | |
| 1933 | Passing Fancy | 出来ごころ | Dekigokoro | |
| 1934 | A Mother Should Be Loved | 母を恋はずや | Haha o kowazuya | Incomplete |
| 1934 | A Story of Floating Weeds | 浮草物語 | Ukigusa monogatari | |
| 1935 | An Innocent Maid | 箱入娘 | Hakoiri musume | Lost |
| 1935 | An Inn in Tokyo | 東京の宿 | Tōkyō no yado | |
| 1936 | College Is a Nice Place | 大学よいとこ | Daigaku yoitoko | Lost |
Sound, black-and-white films
| 1936 | Lion in the Mirror | 菊五郎の鏡獅子 | Kagami jishi | Short documentary |
| 1936 | The Only Son | 一人息子 | Hitori musuko | |
| 1937 | What Did the Lady Forget? | 淑女は何を忘れたか | Shukujo wa nani o wasureta ka | |
| 1941 | Brothers and Sisters of the Toda Family | 戸田家の兄妹 | Todake no kyōdai | |
| 1942 | There Was a Father | 父ありき | Chichi ariki | |
| 1947 | Record of a Tenement Gentleman | 長屋紳士録 | Nagaya Shinshiroku | |
| 1948 | A Hen in the Wind | 風の中の牝鶏 | Kaze no naka no mendori | |
| 1949 | Late Spring | 晩春 | Banshun | Ozu's first film with Setsuko Hara |
| 1950 | The Munekata Sisters | 宗方姉妹 | Munekata shimai | |
| 1951 | Early Summer | 麥秋 | Bakushu | |
| 1952 | The Flavor of Green Tea over Rice | お茶漬けの味 | Ochazuke no aji | Adapted from censored 1939 script |
| 1953 | Tokyo Story | 東京物語 | Tōkyō monogatari | |
| 1956 | Early Spring | 早春 | Sōshun | |
| 1957 | Tokyo Twilight | 東京暮色 | Tōkyō boshoku | |
Colour films
| 1958 | Equinox Flower | 彼岸花 | Higanbana | Ozu's first film in colour |
| 1959 | Good Morning | お早よう | Ohayō | Remake of I Was Born, But... |
| 1959 | Floating Weeds | 浮草 | Ukigusa | Remake of A Story of Floating Weeds |
| 1960 | Late Autumn | 秋日和 | Akibiyori | |
| 1961 | The End of Summer | 小早川家の秋 | Kohayagawa-ke no aki | Ozu's last film with Setsuko Hara |
| 1962 | An Autumn Afternoon | 秋刀魚の味 | Sanma no aji | Ozu's final work |

== Legacy and style ==
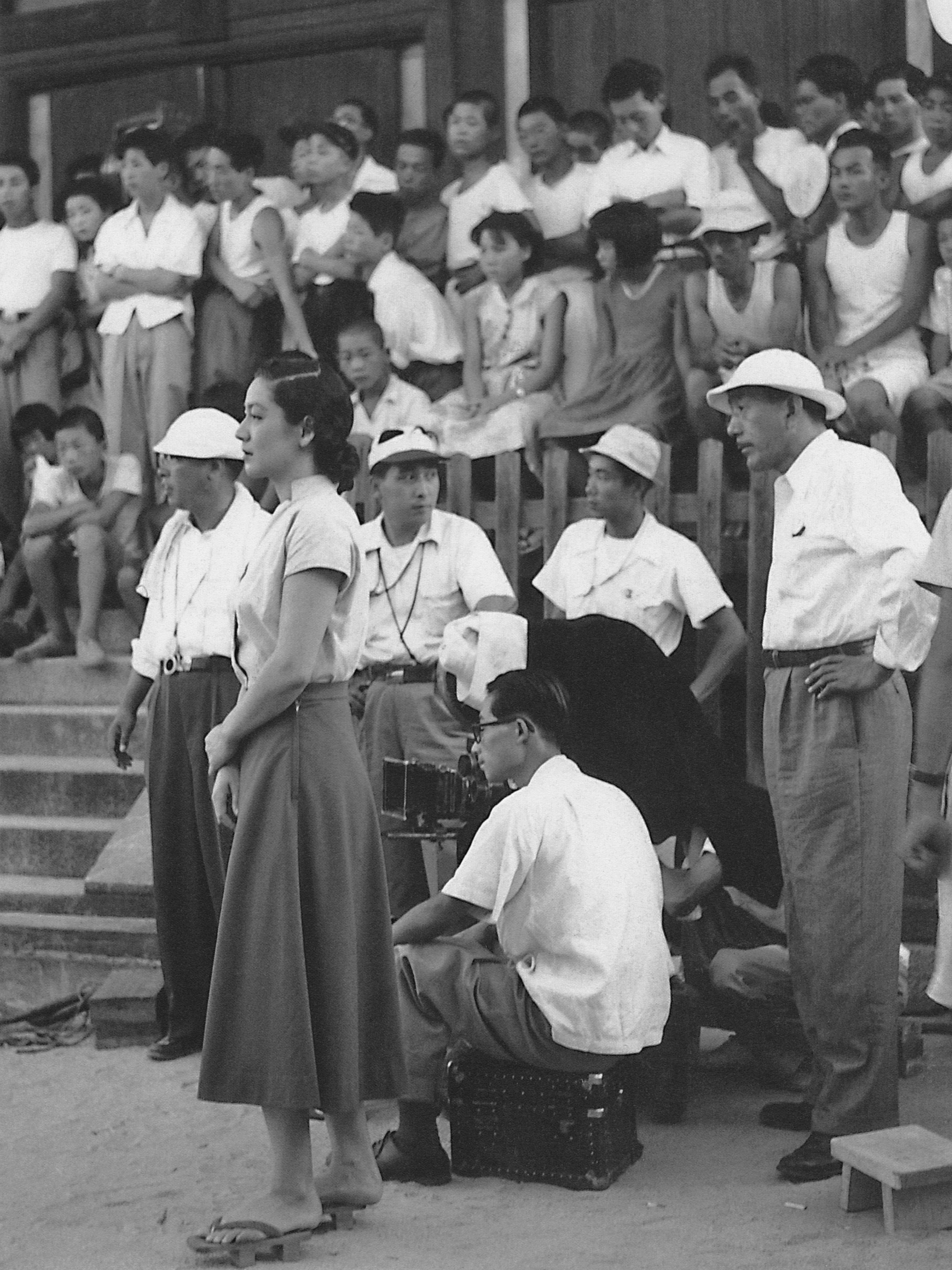
Setsuko Hara (left) and Yasujirō Ozu (far right) on location of Tokyo Story (1953)

Ozu is probably as well known for the technical style and innovation of his films as for the narrative content. The style of his films is most striking in his later films, a style he had not fully developed until his post-war sound films. He did not conform to Hollywood conventions. Rather than using the typical over-the-shoulder shots in his dialogue scenes by most directors, the camera gazes on the actors directly, which has the effect of placing the viewer in the middle of the scene. Throughout his career, Ozu used a 50mm lens, which is usually considered to be the lens closest to human vision.

Ozu did not use typical transitions between scenes. In between scenes he would show shots of certain static objects as transitions, or use direct cuts, rather than fades or dissolves. Most often the static objects would be buildings, where the next indoor scene would take place. It was during these transitions that he would use music, which might begin at the end of one scene, progress through the static transition, and fade into the new scene. He rarely used non-diegetic music in any scenes other than in the transitions. Ozu moved the camera less and less as his career progressed, and ceased using tracking shots altogether in his colour films. However, David Bordwell argues that Ozu is one of the few directors to "create a systematic alternative to Hollywood continuity cinema, but he does so by changing only a few premises."

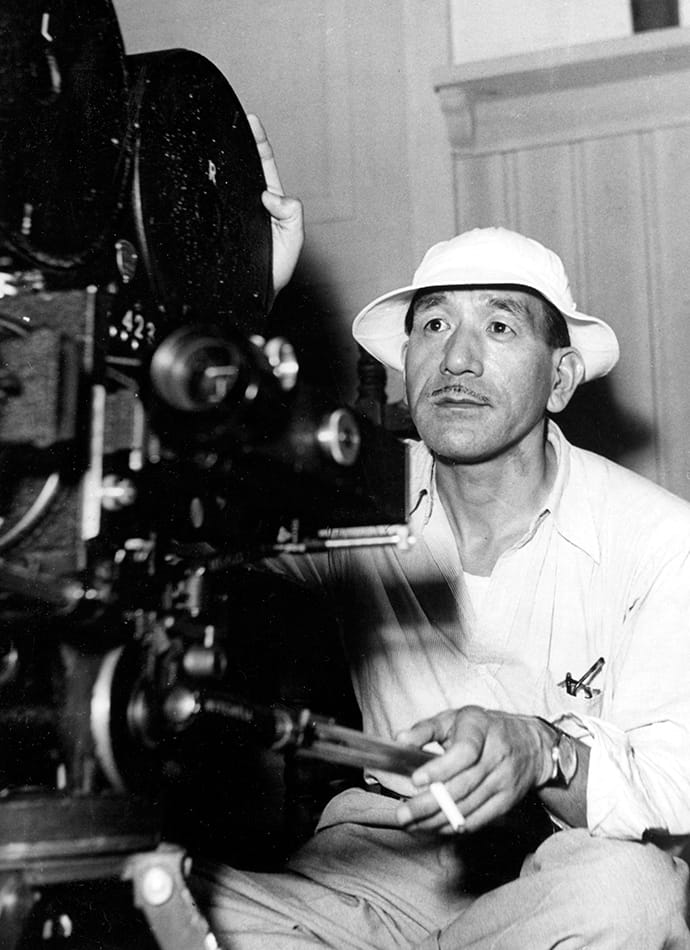
Ozu during a film shoot

Ozu invented the "tatami shot", in which the camera is placed at a low height, supposedly at the eye level of a person kneeling on a tatami mat. Actually, Ozu's camera is often even lower than that, only one or two feet off the ground, which necessitated the use of special tripods and raised sets. He used this low height even when there were no sitting scenes, such as when his characters walked in hallways. When Ozu made his move to colour, he chose to shoot under the German colour process Agfacolor, as he felt that it captured reds much better than any other colour process.

Ozu eschewed the traditional rules of movie storytelling, most notably eyelines. In his review of Floating Weeds, film critic Roger Ebert recounts:

[Ozu] once had a young assistant who suggested that perhaps he should shoot conversations so that it seemed to the audience that the characters were looking at one another. Ozu agreed to a test. They shot a scene both ways, and compared them. "You see?" Ozu said. "No difference!"

Ozu was also an innovator in Japanese narrative structure through his use of ellipses, or the decision not to depict major events in the story. In An Autumn Afternoon (1962), for example, a wedding is merely mentioned in one scene, and the next sequence references this wedding (which has already occurred); the wedding itself is never shown. This is typical of Ozu's films, which eschew melodrama by eliding moments that would often be used in Hollywood in attempts to stir an emotional reaction from audiences.

Ozu became recognized internationally when his films were shown abroad. Influential monographs by Donald Richie, Paul Schrader, and David Bordwell have ensured a wide appreciation of Ozu's style, aesthetics, and themes by the Anglophonic audience.

== Awards and honors ==
Ozu was voted the tenth greatest director of all time in the 2002 British Film Institute's Sight & Sound poll of critics' top 10 directors. Ozu's Tokyo Story has appeared several times in the Sight & Sound poll of best films selected by critics and directors. In 2012, it topped the poll of film directors' choices of "greatest film of all time".

| Year of award or honor | Name of award or honor | Awarding organization | Film title (if applicable) |
|---|---|---|---|
| 1932 | Best Japanese Film | Kinema Junpo | I Was Born, But... |
| 1933 | Best Japanese Film | Kinema Junpo | Passing Fancy |
| 1934 | Best Japanese Film | Kinema Junpo | A Story of Floating Weeds |
| 1941 | Best Japanese Film | Kinema Junpo | Brothers and Sisters of the Toda Family |
| 1949 | Best Japanese Film | Kinema Junpo | Late Spring |
| 1949 | Best Film | Mainichi Film Awards | Late Spring |
| 1949 | Best Director | Mainichi Film Awards | Late Spring |
| 1949 | Best Screenplay | Mainichi Film Awards | Late Spring |
| 1951 | Best Director | Blue Ribbon Awards | Early Summer |
| 1951 | Best Japanese Film | Kinema Junpo | Early Summer |
| 1963 | Special Award | Mainichi Film Awards | |

== Tributes and documentaries ==
In Wim Wenders's documentary Tokyo-Ga (1985), he travels to Japan to explore the world of Ozu, interviewing both Chishū Ryū and Yuharu Atsuta.

Five, a 2003 documentary directed by Abbas Kiarostami, is inspired by Ozu. The film consists of five long takes set by the ocean. Five sequences: 1) A piece of driftwood on the seashore, carried about by the waves 2) People walking on the seashore. The oldest ones stop by, look at the sea, then go away 3) Blurry shapes on a winter beach. A herd of dogs. A love story 4) A group of loud ducks cross the image, in one direction then the other 5) A pond, at night. Frogs improvising a concert. A storm, then the sunrise.

In 2003, the centenary of Ozu's birth was commemorated at various film festivals around the world. Shochiku produced the film Café Lumière (珈琲時光), directed by Taiwanese film-maker Hou Hsiao-hsien as homage to Ozu, with direct reference to the late master's Tokyo Story (1953), to premiere on Ozu's birthday.

Roger Ebert called Ozu "the quietest and gentlest of directors, the most humanistic, the most serene. But the emotions that flow through his films are strong and deep, because they reflect the things we care about the most: Parents and children, marriage or a life lived alone, illness and death, and taking care of one another." He notes that "his films were not widely seen outside Japan until the early 1970s, because he was thought to be 'too Japanese.' He is universal; I have never heard more weeping in the audience during any movie than during his Tokyo Story, which is about children who in a subtle way are too busy to pay proper attention during a visit from their parents."

In 2013, director Yoji Yamada remade Tokyo Story in a modern setting as Tokyo Family.

In 2023, OZU: Ozu Yasujirō ga Kaita Monogatari (OZU～小津安二郎が描いた物語～), a 2023 television series based on Yasujirō Ozu'sl films premiered.

A biographical documentary, The Ozu Diaries, directed by Daniel Raim, premiered at the 82nd Venice International Film Festival in 2025. It was also screened at the AFI Fest 2025 and the 38th Tokyo International Film Festival. Turner Classic Movies (TCM) acquired the North American television rights in 2024.

== Sources ==
- Bock, Audie (1978). "Yasujiro Ozu". Japanese Film Directors. Kodansha. pp. 69–98. ISBN 0-87011-304-6.
- Hasumi, Shiguéhiko (1998), Yasujiro Ozu, translated by Hasumi Shiguehiko, Nakamura Ryoji, René de Ceccatty, Paris: Cahiers du cinéma, ISBN 978-2-86642-191-5
- Hasumi, Shiguéhiko (2003). Kantoku Ozu Yasujiro [Director Yasujiro Ozu] (in Japanese) (Enlarged and definitive ed.). Chikuma Shobo. ISBN 4-480-87341-4.
- Inoue, Kazuo (2003). Ozu Yasujirō Zenshū [Collected Works of Ozu Yasujiro (two-volume boxed set)] (in Japanese). Tokyo: Shinshokan. ISBN 4403150012.
- Ozu, Yasujiro (2016), Franco Picollo; Hiromi Yagi (eds.), Scritti sul cinema (in Italian), Rome: Donzelli, ISBN 978-88-6843-481-6
- Rothman, William (2006). Jeffrey Crouse (ed.). "Notes on Ozu's Cinematic Style". Film International. 4 (22) (Stanley Cavell special issue ed.): 33–42. doi:10.1386/fiin.4.4.33.
- Sato, Tadao (1997b), Le Cinéma japonais – Tome II, translated by Karine Chesneau, Rose-Marie Makino-Fayolle, Tanaka Chiharu, Paris: Centre Georges Pompidou, ISBN 978-2-85850-930-0
- Shindo, Kaneto (21 July 2004). Shinario Jinsei [A life in scriptwriting]. Iwanami Shinsho (in Japanese). Vol. 902. Iwanami. ISBN 4-00-430902-6.
- Torres Hortelano, Lorenzo J., Primavera tardía de Yasujiro Ozu : cine clásico y poética zen, Caja España (León), Obra Social y Cultural, ISBN 978-84-95917-24-9
- Yoshida, Kiju (1998). Ozu's Anti-Cinema. Center for Japanese Studies, University of Michigan. ISBN 978-1-929280-27-8.
