= As a Wife, As a Woman =

1961 Japanese film

- Film poster

Japanese name
- Kanji: 妻として女として
- Directed by: Mikio Naruse
- Written by: Toshirō Ide; Zenzō Matsuyama
- Produced by: Sanezumi Fujimoto; Hidehisa Suga
- Starring: Hideko Takamine; Masayuki Mori; Chikage Awashima
- Cinematography: Jun Yasumoto
- Edited by: Eiji Ooi
- Music by: Ichirō Saitō
- Production company: Toho
- Distributed by: Toho
- Release date: 30 May 1961 (Japan)
- Running time: 106 minutes
- Country: Japan
- Language: Japanese

As a Wife, As a Woman, also titled The Other Woman and Poignant Story (Japanese: 妻として女として, Hepburn: Tsuma to shite onna to shite) is a 1961 Japanese drama film directed by Mikio Naruse.

== Plot ==
Miho, mistress of married professor Keijiro, has been managing the Ginza bar owned by him and his wife Ayako for years, hoping that some day she might be made the owner as appreciation for her efforts. Instead, Ayako mortgages the bar for a new acquisition, leading to a conflict between the two women. Keijiro avoids taking sides, continuing his affair with Miho.

Encouraged by friends, Miho hires a lawyer, Minami, to claim a severance pay. When her hope to win the case fades, she changes track, deciding to instead fight for custody of Keijiro's children, Hiroko and Susumu. Raised by Keijiro and the infertile Ayako as their own, Hiroko and Susumu are Miho's natural children.

In a final confrontation between Keijiro, Ayako and Miho, the children learn that Miho, who had always been introduced to them as their aunt, is their true mother. Hiroko scolds the adults for their insincerity, refusing to get involved in their schemes. Some time later, Hiroko has moved in with a student friend, disappointed with her parents. Miho, compensated with a small sum, plans to open a street food shop, while Ayako contemplates a divorce.

== Cast ==
- Hideko Takamine as Miho Nishigaki
- Masayuki Mori as Keijiro Kouno
- Chikage Awashima as Ayako Kouno
- Yuriko Hoshi as Hiroko Kouno
- Kenzaburō Ōsawa as Susumu Kouno
- Tatsuya Nakadai as Minami
- Chōko Iida as Nishigaki Shino, Miho's grandmother
- Keiko Awaji as Fukuko
- Chieko Nakakita as Toshiko Furuya
- Nobuo Nakamura as Kimura
- Kumi Mizuno as Ruriko
- Chieko Seki as Toshibo
- Natsuko Kahara as Mine
- Murasaki Fujima as Kyoko

== Production and release ==
The screenplay for As a Wife, As a Woman was inspired by actual court cases. The film was released in Japan on 30 May 1961 and in the U.S. in a subtitled version in March 1962.

== Reception and themes ==
For Naruse biographer Catherine Russell, As a Wife, As a Woman was "intended to have educational value" and "poses some serious questions about women's work and social responsibility, and the gender inequities of a family system that more or less condones extramarital affairs for men." Co-scenarist Toshirō Ide noted in an article that this was the first time that a divorce was accepted as a film's conclusion, other than proposed similar endings of past collaborations by Ide and Naruse like Repast, Wife and A Wife's Heart, which had been changed by the producers. While according to Russell some critics had endorsed the film, Russell herself pointed out a lack of the director's expressive use of cinematic form.

== Legacy ==
As a Wife, As a Woman was screened at the Berkeley Art Museum and Pacific Film Archive in 1981 and at the Museum of Modern Art in 1985 as part of their retrospectives on Mikio Naruse, the latter organised by the Kawakita Memorial Film Institute and film scholar Audie Bock.
