= Husband and Wife (1953 film) =

1953 Japanese film

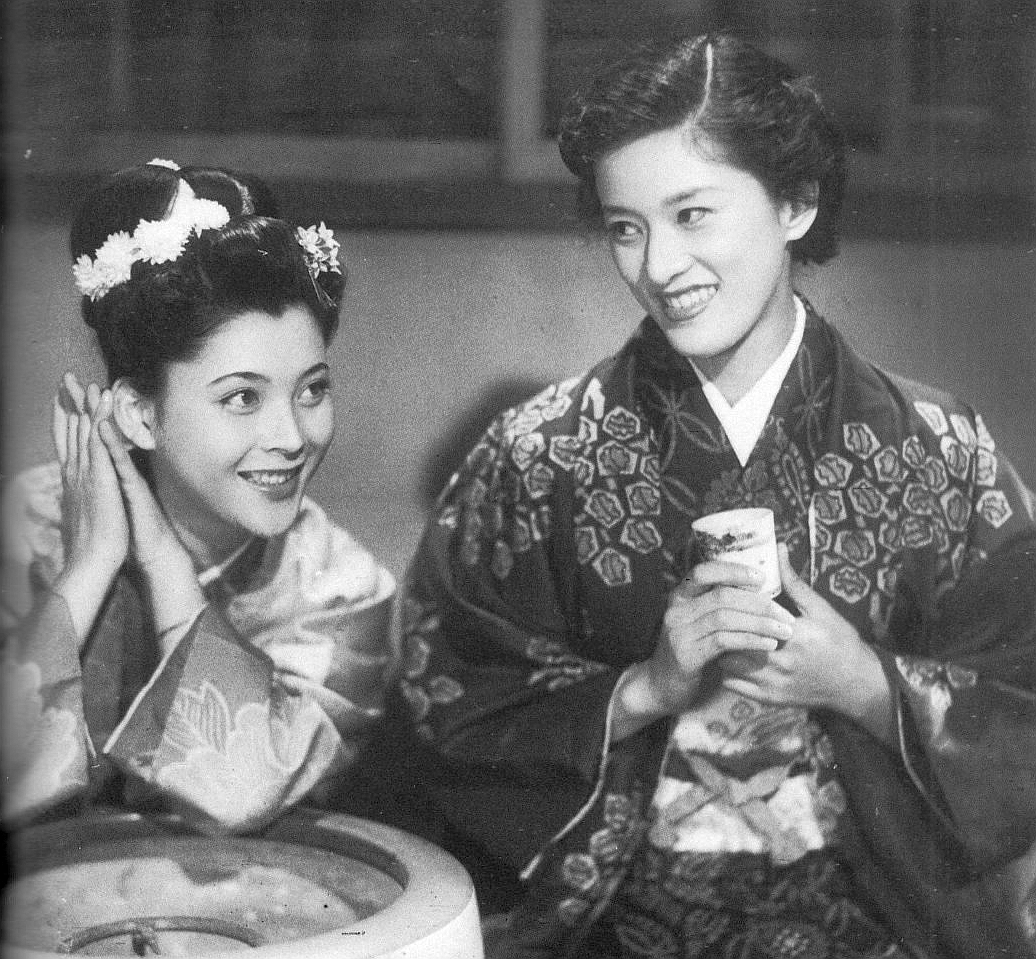
- Mariko Okada (left) and Yoko Sugi.

Japanese name
- Kanji: 夫婦
- Directed by: Mikio Naruse
- Written by: Toshirō Ide; Yoko Mizuki
- Produced by: Sanezumi Fujimoto
- Starring: Yōko Sugi; Ken Uehara; Rentarō Mikuni
- Cinematography: Asakazu Nakai
- Edited by: Hidetoshi Kasama
- Music by: Ichirō Saitō
- Production company: Toho
- Distributed by: Toho
- Release date: 22 January 1953 (Japan)
- Running time: 87 minutes
- Country: Japan
- Language: Japanese

Husband and Wife (Japanese: 夫婦, Hepburn: Fūfu) is a 1953 Japanese comedy-drama film directed by Mikio Naruse.

== Plot ==
Because her brother's future wife will soon move into the family's house, Kikuko and her husband Isaku are forced to look for a new room. They move into the house of Isaku's colleague Ryota, who has just lost his wife. Kikuko and the spontaneous, emotional Ryota develop an affection for each other, much to the concern of the rather detached, distanced Isaku. Kikuko and Isaku finally move into a new room whose landlady only accepts tenants without children. When Kikuko admits to her husband that she is pregnant, he tries to talk her into having an abortion. Kikuko first gives in, but eventually refuses, and Isaku agrees to have the child, even if their decision will make things difficult for them.

== Cast ==
- Yōko Sugi as Kikuko
- Ken Uehara as Isaku
- Rentarō Mikuni as Ryota
- Keiju Kobayashi as Shigekichi, Kikuko's brother
- Mariko Okada as Kumiko, Kikuko's sister
- Kamatari Fujiwara as Kikuko's father
- Hisako Takihana as Kikuko's mother
- Chieko Nakakita as Mrs. Akamatsu
- Eiko Miyoshi as landlady

== Background ==
Like other Naruse films from this period, such as Repast and Wife, the theme of Husband and Wife involves a couple trapped with each other, and, another recurring motif in the director's films, a character is forced to redefine oneself and test his/her strength. Husband and Wife was Yōko Sugi's only starring role in a Naruse film, playing a part that had originally been intended for Setsuko Hara.

== Reception ==
Slant Magazine critic Keith Uhlich awarded Husband and Wife 3.5/4 stars, describing it as a "what if" scenario, specifically, "what if Charlie Chaplin and Buster Keaton were locked together in a room and forced to fight over Mary Pickford?", a parallel which becomes explicit in a scene where the protagonists visit a stage show reenactment of a Chaplin routine. According to Uhlich, the film's theme is the journey towards "reconciliation of those contradictions inherent to being human."

== Legacy ==
Husband and Wife was shown in the U.S. (including the Museum of Modern Art) as part of a Naruse retrospective in 1985, organised by the Kawakita Memorial Film Institute and film scholar Audie Bock.
