= Daughters, Wives and a Mother =

1960 Japanese film

- Film poster
- 娘・妻・母
- Directed by: Mikio Naruse
- Screenplay by: Toshirō Ide; Zenzo Matsuyama
- Produced by: Sanezumi Fujimoto
- Starring: Setsuko Hara; Masayuki Mori; Hideko Takamine
- Cinematography: Jun Yasumoto
- Edited by: Eiji Ooi
- Music by: Ichirō Saitō
- Production company: Toho
- Distributed by: Toho
- Release date: 21 May 1960 (Japan)
- Running time: 122 minutes
- Country: Japan
- Language: Japanese

Daughters, Wives and a Mother (Japanese: 娘・妻・母, Hepburn: Musume • tsuma • haha) is a 1960 Japanese drama film directed by Mikio Naruse.

== Plot ==
Sanae, a recent widow and the eldest daughter of a family, returns to her mother, eldest brother and his brother's wife. The family argues over what to do with the money Sanae's husband left her.

== Cast ==
- Setsuko Hara as Sanae Sakanoshi, the eldest daughter
- Masayuki Mori as Yūichirō Sakanishi, the eldest son
- Hideko Takamine as Kazuko Sakanishi, Yuichiro's wife
- Reiko Dan as Haruko Sakanishi, the third daughter
- Mitsuko Kusabue as Kaoru Sakanishi, the second daughter
- Aiko Mimasu as Aki Sakanishi, the mother
- Akira Takarada as Reiji Sakanishi, the younger son
- Tatsuya Nakadai as Shingo Kuroki, a brewing engineer
- Hiroshi Koizumi as Hidetaka Tani, Kaoru's husband
- Haruko Sugimura as Kayo Tani, Hidetaka's mother
- Keiko Awaji as Mie Banishi, Reiji's wife
- Hiroshi Tachikawa as Makoto Asabuki, Haruko's lover
- Daisuke Katō as Shōsuke Tetsumoto, Kazuko's uncle
- Ken Uehara as Sokei Gojō, Sanae's matchmaker
- Chishū Ryū as old man in park

== Release ==
Daughters, Wives and a Mother received a roadshow theatrical release at the Yūraku-za Theatre in Tokyo, Japan on 21 May 1960. It was the first Japanese film to play at the theatre since World War II. It received a general release on 28 May 1960. The film was Toho's highest-grossing film production of 1960 and the eighth highest-grossing Japanese production of 1960. It was released in the United States with English subtitles by Toho International on December 1, 1978.
