= The Sound of the Mountain =

1954 novel by Yasunari Kawabata

- First English-language edition
- Author: Yasunari Kawabata
- Original title: 山の音; Yama no oto
- Translator: Edward Seidensticker
- Language: Japanese
- Publication date: 1949–1954
- Publication place: Japan
- English publication date: 1970 (Knopf)
- Media type: Print (hardcover)

The Sound of the Mountain (Japanese: 山の音, Hepburn: Yama no oto) is a novel by Japanese writer Yasunari Kawabata, serialized between 1949 and 1954, and first published as a standalone book in 1954 by Chikuma Shobō, Tokyo.

== Plot ==
Shingo Ogata, a 62-year-old businessman living in Kamakura and working in Tokyo, is close to retirement. He is experiencing temporary lapses of memory, recalling strange and disturbing dreams upon waking, and hearing sounds, including the titular noise which awakens him from his sleep, "like wind, far away, but with a depth like a rumbling of the earth." Shingo takes the sound to be an omen of his impending death. At the same time, he is repeatedly confronted with the deaths of his friends and former fellow students.

Shingo observes and questions his relations with the other family members. He married his wife Yasuko after the untimely death of her older sister, whose beauty Shingo adored, considering both Yasuko and their daughter Fusako to be rather unattractive. Shingo has both fatherly and subtle erotic feelings for his daughter-in-law Kikuko, who calmly endures his son Shūichi's affair with another woman. When Fusako leaves her husband and returns to the family home with her two little children, Shingo starts to perceive the marital difficulties of his son and daughter as the result of not fulfilling his role as a father. In addition, Fusako blames him for marrying her to a man she did not want, and for preferring Kikuko over her.

Shingo's secretary Eiko helps him to find Shūichi's mistress Kinuko, a war widow, and learns of his son's mean and abusive behaviour towards her. Not only is Shūichi reluctant to agree to his father's request to end the affair and treat his wife Kikuko with more respect, he even borrows money from his mistress to pay for Kikuko's abortion. Shingo is devastated, speculating if Shūichi's and Kikuko's unborn child might have been the reincarnation of Yasuko's older sister. Shūichi eventually leaves Kinuko when she expects a child, which she claims to be from another man and wants to keep. In the newspaper, Shingo and his family read about the suicide attempt of Fusako's husband, whom Fusako is about to divorce.

== Characters ==
- Shingo Ogata
- Yasuko, Shingo's wife
- Shūichi, Shingo's son
- Kikuko, Shūichi's wife
- Fusako, Shingo's daughter
- Eiko Tanazaki, Shingo's secretary
- Kinuko, Shūichi's mistress (shortened to Kinu in the English translation with the author's permission, to avoid confusion with Kikuko)
- Mrs Ikeda, Kinuko's flatmate
- Satoko, Fusako's elder daughter
- Kuniko, Fusako's younger daughter
- Mr Tatsumu, Mr Aida, Mr Toriyama, Mr Suzumoto, Mr Mizuta, Mr Itakura, Mr Kitamoto, old friends of Shingo, mostly deceased
- Aihara, Fusako's husband
- Grandfather Amamiya, a neighbour
- Natsuko Iwamura, Shingo's second secretary
- Teru, a dog

== Themes ==
The protagonist Shingo constantly reflects on his ageing, which manifests itself in his loss of memory, eyesight and even his male potency, wondering why he was not aroused during an erotic dream. He is also repeatedly confronted with mortality through the passing of friends and former fellow students, or the death of a young woman who committed shinjū with Fusako's husband. Human life and death correspond with the entire cycle of seasons (the proceedings start in autumn and end in autumn of the following year).

Another theme Kawabata observes is the effect of the war on his protagonists. Shūichi's mistress Kinuko repeatedly refers to the war, which took her husband and prevented her from becoming a mother, and her flatmate Ikeda explains Shūichi's mean behaviour and attitude towards women through his wartime experiences.

== Style ==
The Sound of the Mountain completely takes the point of view of its protagonist, emphasising on his interior reactions rather than on exterior events, and disregards any thoughts of the subordinate characters. Like much of his work, it is written in short, spare prose akin to poetry, which its English-language translator Edward Seidensticker likened to a haiku in the introduction to his translation of Kawabata's novel Snow Country.

== Reception and legacy ==
Kawabata received the 1954 Noma Literary Prize for The Sound of the Mountain.

For the first U.S. edition (1970), translator Edward Seidensticker won the National Book Award in the category Translation.

The Sound of the Mountain is included in the Norwegian Bokklubben World Library's list of the 100 greatest works of world literature, which was established in 2002.

== Adaptations ==
Kawabata's novel was adapted into a film as Sound of the Mountain in 1954, directed by Mikio Naruse and starring Setsuko Hara, Sō Yamamura and Ken Uehara. It was also adapted for Japanese television in 1963 and 1984.
