= Sumie Tanaka =

Japanese screenwriter and playwright (1908–2000)

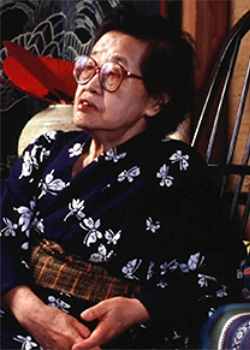
- Born: Sumie Tsujimura; 11 April 1908
- Died: 1 March 2000 (aged 91)
- Occupations: Playwright, screenwriter, essayist
- Spouse: Chikao Tanaka
- Writing career
- Language: Japanese
- Notable works: Repast (screenplay); Lightning (screenplay); The Eternal Breasts (screenplay)
- Notable awards: Blue Ribbon Award; Ministry of Education Award for Arts; Yomiuri Prize for Literature

Sumie Tanaka (田中澄江, Tanaka Sumie; 11 April 1908 — 1 March 2000) was a Japanese screenwriter and playwright with a feminist agenda. She was a long-time collaborator of film director Mikio Naruse and wrote screenplays for Japan's first major female director Kinuyo Tanaka. A member of the Bungakuza theatre company, she was married to dramatist Chikao Tanaka. Awards she received for her work include the Blue Ribbon Award, the Ministry of Education Award for Arts and the Yomiuri Prize for Literature.

== Life and career ==
Sumie Tanaka was born in Tokyo and graduated from Tokyo Women's Higher Normal School in 1932. During her student years, she had published her works in Kidō Okamoto's magazine Butai (舞台, engl. "Stage") and Iteki (夷狄, engl. "Barbarians"), and participated in the playwright workshops run by Kunio Kishida and Kan Kikuchi. After her graduation, she first worked as a teacher. In 1934, she married her fellow playwright Chikao Tanaka, with whom she wrote plays for the Bungakuza theatre company. In her one-act plays like Kagerō (lit. "A shimmering", 1934), Akiko no kao (lit. "Akiko's face", 1936) and Izokutachi (lit. "The bereaved family", 1937), Tanaka often depicted the life of middle-class families based on her own experiences. 1939 saw the premiere of her first full-length play, Haru, aki (lit. "Spring, autumn"). After the end of World War II, she and her family were baptized as Catholics, an event that strongly influenced her work from then on.

Tanaka started working in the film industry in the 1950s, a period considered to be the "second Golden Age" of Japanese cinema. She had a long collaboration with directors Mikio Naruse and Kinuyo Tanaka and adapted works by woman writers like Fumiko Hayashi and Aya Kōda. Tanaka was an outspoken feminist, once stating that she wanted to "change the patriarchal system of Japanese society into something else during our generation". According to Toshirō Ide, her co-writer on Naruse's Repast, she left the project prematurely when the film studio insisted on a conciliatory ending instead of the female protagonist's divorce, as the two writers had originally intended. The screenplays she wrote for Repast, Noboru Nakamura's Home Sweet Home and Keisuke Kinoshita's Boyhood won her the 1951 Blue Ribbon Award for Best Screenplay. She also wrote for other notable directors such as Heinosuke Gosho (Dispersed Clouds, 1951), Kōzaburō Yoshimura (Night River, 1956, Night Butterflies, 1957) and Shin Saburi (Kokoro ni hana no saku hi made, 1955, Night Seagull, 1957).

Tanaka continued to write stage plays such as Akujo to me to kabe (lit. "A wicked woman and eyes and wall", 1948), Garashia, Hosokawa fujin (lit. "Gratia, Lady Hosokawa", 1959) and Shirokujaku (lit. "The white peacock", 1967), which she wrote for the actress Yaeko Mizutani. She turned to writing for television in the 1960s and was also a renowned essayist. Later award-winning works include Kakitsubata Gunraku (lit. "Kakitsubata Community", 1973), the essay collection Hana no hyakumeizan (lit. "Flowers of one hundred mountains", 1980) and the short story collection Fū no shimatsu (lit. "Disposal of my husband", 1995).

== Selected works ==
=== Screenplays ===
- Boyhood (1951, co-sc.)
- Home Sweet Home (1951, co-sc.)
- Dispersed Clouds (1951, co-sc.)
- Repast (1951, co-sc.)
- Lightning (1952)
- Shishi no za (1953, co-sc.)
- Late Chrysanthemums (1954)
- The Eternal Breasts (1955)
- Kokoro ni hana no saku hi made (1955, co-sc.)
- Night River (1956)
- Onna no ashiato (1956, co-sc.)
- Flowing (1956, co-sc.)
- Women in Prison (1956)
- Dancing Girl (1957)
- Night Butterflies (1957)
- Yoru no Kamome (Night Seagull) (1957)
- Onna de aru koto (1958, co-sc.)
- Anzukko (1958, co-sc.)
- Beauty is Guilty (1959)
- Onna gokoro (1959)
- Izu no odoriko (1960)
- Girls of the Night (1961)
- Onna no hashi (1961)
- A Wanderer's Notebook (1962, co-sc.)
- Uzushio (1964, co-sc.)
- Tabiji (1967)

=== Theatre plays ===
- Tekona to koi to (1930)
- Sōmeikyoku ni-tanchō (1932)
- Kagerō (1934)
- Akiko no kao (1936)
- Izokutachi (1937)
- Haru, aki (1939)
- Akujo to me to kabe (1948)
- Hotaru no ota (1949)
- Akai zakuro (1950)
- Garashia, Hosokawa fujin (1959)
- Shirokujaku (1967)
