= Fumiko Nakajō =

Japanese author

- Born: Fumiko Noe; 25 November 1922; Obihiro, Hokkaidō, Japan
- Died: 3 August 1954 (aged 31); Sapporo, Japan
- Occupation: Writer
- Writing career
- Genre: poetry

Fumiko Nakajō (中城ふみ子 Nakajō Fumiko, real name 野江富美子 Noe Fumiko, November 25, 1922 in Obihiro, Hokkaidō – August 3, 1954 in Sapporo) was a Japanese tanka poet.

== Life ==
Fumiko Nakajō attended the Tokyo Academy of Home Economics (later Tokyo Kasei-Gakuin University) and studied tanka with Ikeda Kikan (1896–1956), a scholar of Japanese literature. Married in 1942, she gave birth to four children before the marriage was divorced. Diagnosed with breast cancer, she underwent mastectomies in 1952 and 1953. Shortly before her death in 1954, a series of her poems were printed in Tanka kenkyū and Tanka magazines with the recommendation of writer Yasunari Kawabata, and her first book, the collection Chibusa sōshitsu (乳房喪失, Losing My Breasts), was published. A second collection, Hana no genkei (花の原型, A Prototype of Flowers), appeared posthumously. Many of her poems addressed her illness, and she sometimes altered the tanka form to make it more expressive.

There are memorials to her at the Tokachi Gokoku Shrine, beside the Obihiro Shrine, and behind the Obihiro Centennial Memorial Hall.

== Film ==
In 1955, Nikkatsu studios produced the film The Eternal Breasts (also known as Forever a Woman), based on Nakajō's life. It was directed by Kinuyo Tanaka and starred Yumeji Tsukioka, Ryoji Hayama and Yōko Sugi.

== Bibliography ==
- Kawamura, Hatsue; Reichhold, Jane, eds. (2004). Breasts of Snow: Fumiko Nakajo – Her tanka and her life. Tokyo: The Japan Times. ISBN 4-7890-1161-5.
