= Meshi =

Meshi may refer to:

- Meshi, steamed rice (barley or millet). Cf. List of Japanese dishes#Meshi
- Meshi, Japanese name of Repast (film), a film by Mikio Naruse
- Mehsi, Bihar, a town and Nagar Parishad in Bihar, India
