= Floating Clouds =

1955 Japanese drama film

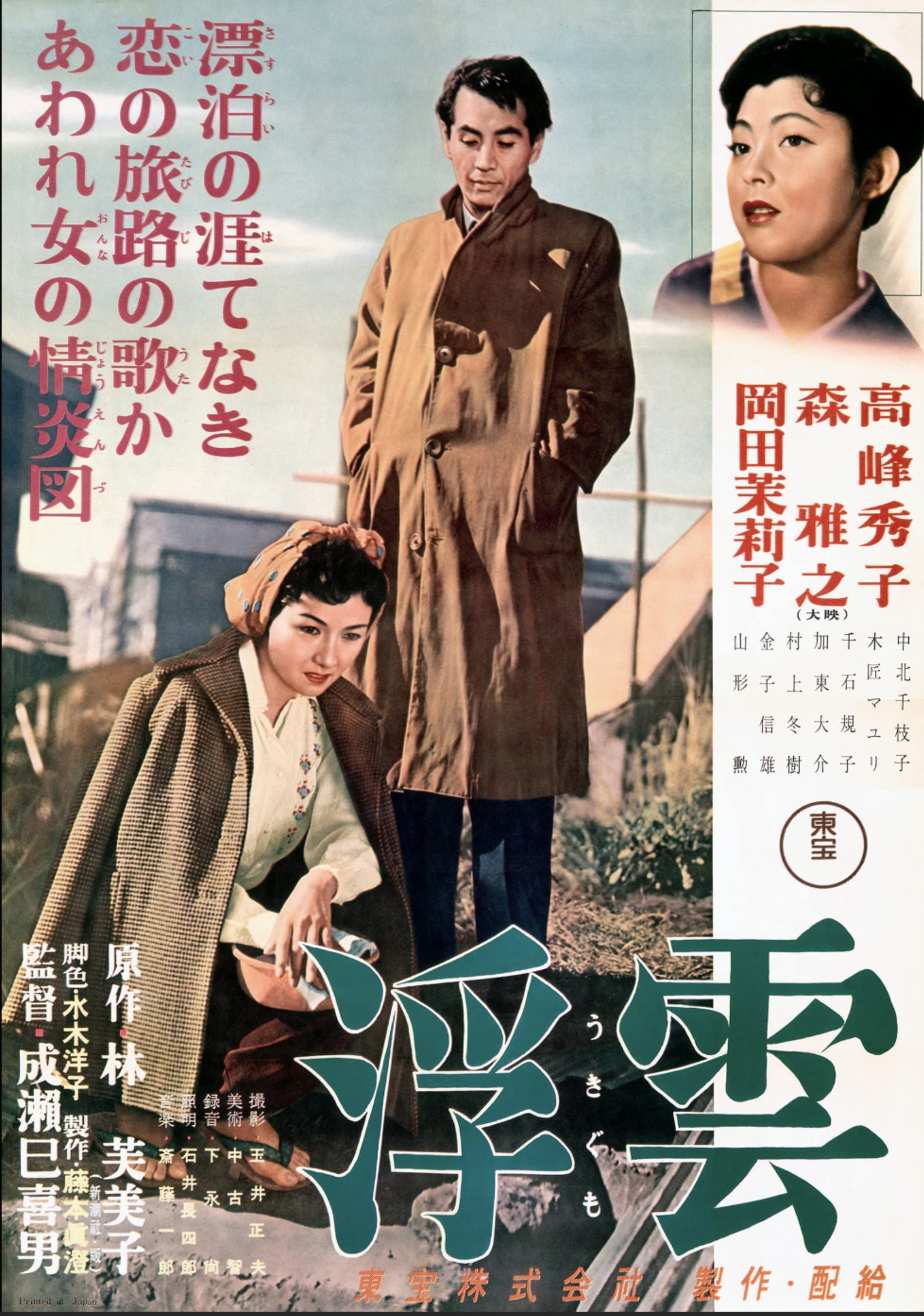
- Theatrical release poster
- Directed by: Mikio Naruse
- Screenplay by: Yoko Mizuki
- Based on: Floating Clouds by Fumiko Hayashi
- Produced by: Sanezumi Fujimoto
- Starring: Hideko Takamine; Masayuki Mori; Mariko Okada
- Cinematography: Masao Tamai
- Edited by: Eiji Ōi
- Music by: Ichirō Saitō
- Production company: Toho
- Distributed by: Toho
- Release date: 15 January 1955 (Japan)
- Running time: 123 minutes
- Country: Japan
- Language: Japanese

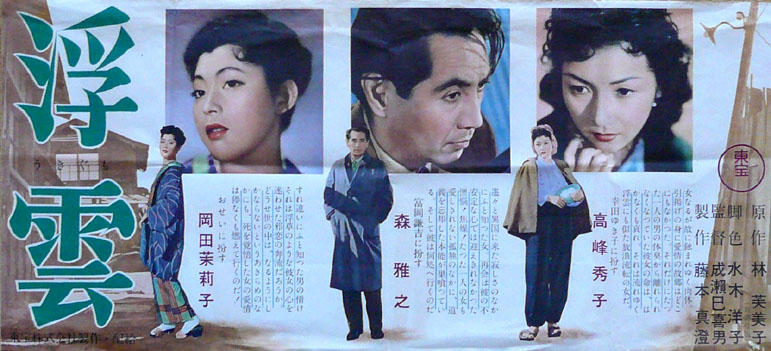
Film poster showing (from the left) Mariko Okada, Masayuki Mori and Hideko Takamine.

Floating Clouds (Japanese: 浮雲, Hepburn: Ukigumo) is a 1955 Japanese drama film directed by Mikio Naruse and based on the novel Ukigumo by Fumiko Hayashi, published just before her death in 1951. (Note: The serialisation of Ukigumo ended in August 1951, two months after Hayashi's death on 28 June.) The film received numerous national awards upon its release and remains one of Naruse's most acclaimed works.

== Plot ==
The film follows Yukiko, a woman who has just been expatriated from French Indochina, where she has been working as a secretary for a forestry project of the Japanese wartime government. In Tokyo, Yukiko seeks out Kengo, one of the engineers of the project, with whom she had an affair and who had promised to divorce his wife Kuniko for her. They renew their affair, but Kengo tells Yukiko he is unable to leave his sickly wife. She becomes the mistress of an American soldier as a means to survive in times of economic restraint. Still, Yukiko can't cut ties with Kengo, although he even starts an affair with a married younger woman, Osei. Pregnant from Kengo, Yukiko has an abortion. She later hears from Kengo that Kuniko has died from illness. Eventually, Yukiko follows Kengo to his new job on Yakushima island, where she dies of her bad health and the humid climate.

== Cast ==
- Hideko Takamine as Yukiko Koda
- Masayuki Mori as Kengo Tomioka
- Mariko Okada as Osei Mukai
- Chieko Nakakita as Kuniko Tomioka
- Daisuke Katō as Seikichi Mukai
- Isao Yamagata as Sugio Iba
- Mayuri Mokushō as girl from Nomiya
- Noriko Sengoku as a lady of Yakushima
- Fuyuki Murakami as Makita
- Heihachiro Okawa as Dr. Higa
- Nobuo Kaneko as Kanō
- Roy James as American soldier
- Akira Tani as a believer

== Reception ==
Film director Yasujirō Ozu saw Floating Clouds upon its release and called it "a real masterpiece" in his journals.

== Awards ==
- 1956: Blue Ribbon Awards for Best Film
- 1956: Kinema Junpo Award for Best Film, Best Actor (Masayuki Mori), for Best Actress (Hideko Takamine), and for Best Director (Mikio Naruse)
- 1956: Mainichi Film Concours for Best Film, for Best Actress (Hideko Takamine), for Best Director (Mikio Naruse), and for Best Sound Recording (Hisashi Shimonaga)

== Legacy ==
Floating Clouds is Naruse's most popular film in Japan. It ranked number three of the best Japanese films of all time in a poll of 140 Japanese critics and filmmakers conducted by the magazine Kinema Junpo in 1999.

It was screened at the Berkeley Art Museum and Pacific Film Archive in 1981, at the Museum of Modern Art in 1985, and at the Harvard Film Archive in 2005 as part of their retrospectives on Mikio Naruse, and at the Cinémathèque Française in 2012 and 2018.

== Analysis ==
Adrian Martin, editor of on-line film journal Rouge, has remarked upon Naruse's cinema of walking. Bertrand Tavernier, speaking of Naruse's Sound of the Mountain, described how the director minutely describes each journey and that "such comings and goings represent uncertain yet reassuring transitions: they are a way of taking stock, of defining a feeling". So in Floating Clouds, the walks down streets "are journeys of the everyday, where time is measured out of footfalls, – and where even the most melodramatic blow or the most ecstatic moment of pleasure cannot truly take the characters out of the unromantic, unsentimental forward progression of their existences."

Film scholar Freda Freiberg has remarked on the terrain of the film: "The frustrations and moroseness of the lovers in Floating Clouds are directly linked to and embedded in the depressed and demoralised social and economic conditions of early post-war Japan; the bombed-out cities, the shortage of food and housing, the ignominy of national defeat and foreign occupation, the economic temptation of prostitution with American military personnel."
