= Conduct Report on Professor Ishinaka =

1950 Japanese film

- Film poster
- 石中先生行状記
- Directed by: Mikio Naruse
- Written by: Ryuichiro Yagi (screenplay); Yōjirō Ishizaka (stories)
- Produced by: Masumi Fujimoto
- Starring: Juzo Miyata; Atsushi Watanabe; Yōko Sugi; Ryō Ikebe; Toshiro Mifune
- Cinematography: Hiroshi Suzuki
- Edited by: Shin Nagata
- Music by: Tadashi Hattori
- Production companies: Shintoho; Fujimoto Pro
- Distributed by: Shintoho
- Release date: 22 January 1950 (Japan)
- Running time: 96 / 93 minutes
- Country: Japan
- Language: Japanese

Conduct Report on Professor Ishinaka (Japanese: 石中先生行状記, Hepburn: Ishinaka sensei gyōjōki; lit. Conduct Report of Professor Ishinaka) is a 1950 Japanese comedy film directed by Mikio Naruse. It consists of three self-contained episodes, based on stories by Yōjirō Ishizaka.

== Plot ==
Episode 1 "A Story of Buried Gasoline"

Professor Ishinaka is a novelist living in a village in Aomori and respected by the villagers for his advice. He is paid a visit by Yuzō, a young man who believes that he and his army comrades buried 460 drums of gasoline in the orchard of local farmer Yamazaki shortly before the end of the war. Ishinaka, Yuzō, Yamazaki and townsman Nakamura start digging, but soon give up and drink sake instead, entertained by Yamazaki's daughter Moyoko with a traditional folk dance. Yuzō later confesses to Moyoko that he only pretended that the drums were buried in her father's orchard because he fell in love with her during his first visit and wanted to meet her again. Ishinaka, Yuzō and Nakamura leave the digging to Yamazaki, who thinks that Yuzō and his daughter would make a good pair and asks the professor to act as a matchmaker for their wedding.

Episode 2 "A Story of an Argument"

Yamada, owner of the local bookstore, tells customer Kihara that he has two tickets for a travelling burlesque show which is visiting the village. Both men agree that, with the public morals at stake, they should attend the show for "examination". Yamada's daughter Mariko is indignant when she hears of her father visiting the show, and tells her boyfriend Shuichi, son of Kihara, to wait with her outside of the venue afterwards and confront their fathers for their behaviour. When Yamada and Kihara appear, they blame each other for the idea to attend the show. Mariko and Shuichi quickly side with their fathers, leading to an argument which results in Mariko refusing to speak to Shuichi. Professor Ishinaka manages to bring the fathers and the young couple together again.

Episode 3 "A Story of a Carriage of Hay"

Yoshiko, a young woman from Iwaki, visits her sister at the hospital in the next town. One of the fellow patients reads her palm and predicts that she will soon meet her future husband. On her way back, Takichi, a farmer from Yoshiko's village, offers her a ride on his hay carriage. During a rest at a teahouse, Yoshiko mistakes Takichi's carriage with that of Teisaku from Harago village and falls asleep. When she wakes up at Teisaku's home, his family invites Yoshiko to stay for the night due to the late time of day, and she agrees to visit a local festivity with him. The next day, before Yoshiko's departure, Teisaku's mother has a constable and Professor Ishinaka write a certificate that the young woman slept in the mother's room and that her virginity is still intact. After dropping Yoshiko off near her home, Teisaku asks Ishinaka, who was riding along on his bike, if he believes in love at first sight. Ishinaka agrees, advising Teisaku to accompany Yoshiko right up to her house.

== Cast ==
- Juzo Miyata as Professor Ishinaka
- Atsushi Watanabe as Kin'ichirō Nakamura

Episode 1

- Yuji Hori as Yuzō Kawai
- Eitarō Shindō as Yamazaki
- Mayuri Mokushō as Moyoko, Yamazaki's daughter

Episode 2

- Kamatari Fujiwara as Takezo Yamada
- Yaeko Izumo as Tomoko, Yamada's wife
- Yōko Sugi as Mariko, Yamada's daughter
- Zekō Nakamura as Kamekichi Kihara
- Ryō Ikebe as Shuichi, Kihara's son
- Fujio Nagahama as bathhouse owner
- Haruko Tozan as dancer

Episode 3

- Toshiro Mifune as Teisaku Nagasawa
- Yōyō Kojima as Teisaku's father
- Chōko Iida as Teisaku's mother
- Shiro Mizutani as Teisaku's younger brother
- Setsuko Wakayama as Yoshiko Kimura
- Chieko Nakakita as Katsuko, Yoshiko's sister
- Hiroshi Yanagiya as Seijirō, Katsuko's husband
- Haruo Tanaka as Aikawa
- Yōnosuke Toba as constable
- Tsuruko Mano
- Fumito Matsuo

== Background ==
Ishinaka sensei gyōjōki was a series of stories by Ishizaka first published in the monthly magazine Shōsetsu Shinchō and later collected in book form by the Shinchōsha publishing house between 1948 and 1954. It was also adapted for television in 1960 and again for film in 1966.

The film Yoshiko watches in the cinema is Aoi sanmyaku (1949), also based on a work by Ishizaka.

== Reception ==
Naruse biographer Catherine Russell describes Conduct Report on Professor Ishinaka as "a trilogy of short romantic comedies" and "narratives of hope and optimism, as new couples are formed to carry on the work of the New Japan". Although Russell sees the performances in this film and Naruse's other works of 1950 (Angry Street, White Beast and Battle of Roses) as "under-rehearsed", she singles out Conduct Report on Professor Ishinaka and White Beast as "well-made films" featuring "strong-minded female characters".

== Home media ==
Conduct Report on Professor Ishinaka was released on DVD in Japan in 2023.
