= A Rainbow Plays in My Heart =

- Original Japanese movie poster
- Directed by: Ishirō Honda
- Starring: Akira Takarada; Momoko Kōchi; Akemi Negishi; Ken Uehara; Mieko Takamine
- Distributed by: Toho
- Release date: 9 July 1957 (Japan)
- Country: Japan
- Language: Japanese

A Rainbow Plays in My Heart (Japanese: わが胸に虹は消えず, Hepburn: Waga mune ni niji wa kiezu) is a 1957 two part black and white Japanese film directed by Ishirō Honda.

== Cast ==
Actor	Role
Akira Takarada (宝田明)	Tatsuo Itō (伊東達雄)
Momoko Kōchi (河内桃子)	Ikuko Asō (麻生伊久子)
Akemi Negishi (根岸明美)	Otsuko Shimada (島田阿津子)
Ken Uehara (上原謙)	Shūji Asō (麻生周治)
Mieko Takamine (高峰三枝子)	Yoshie Kawano (河野芳江)
Tatsuyoshi Ehara (江原達怡)	Jun Kawano (河野純)
Yōko Sugi (杉葉子)	Seiko Muromachi (室町清子)
