= Natsuko Kahara =

Japanese actress (1921–1991)

- Born: Hatsuko Tsukahara; 3 January 1921; Tokyo, Japan
- Died: 20 February 1991 (aged 70)
- Occupations: Actress, stage director
- Years active: 1939-1988

Natsuko Kahara (賀原夏子, Kahara Natsuko; 3 January 1921 – 20 February 1991) was a Japanese stage and film actress. She was a member of the Bungakuza theatre company and regularly appeared in the films of director Mikio Naruse. During her 50 years spanning career, she also worked for directors such as Yasujirō Ozu, Akira Kurosawa, Keisuke Kinoshita and Tadashi Imai.

== Biography ==
Natsuko Kahara was born Hatsuko Tsukahara in Tokyo. After graduating from Toyo Eiwa Girls' School, she gave her stage debut at the Bungakuza theatre company in 1939. She started appearing in films in 1946, starting with Keisuke Kinoshita's Morning for the Osone Family, and became a regular cast member of the films of Mikio Naruse in the 1950s.

Kahara left the Bungakuza in the wake of the "Harp of Joy incident" (the Bungakuza ensemble had split over the refusal of some of its members to perform Yukio Mishima's play The Harp of Joy) to become a founding member of the Geikan NLT theatre group in 1964, which staged many of Mishima's plays. In 1969, after the group's split, she debuted as a stage director at NLT. In addition to her stage and film work, she also regularly appeared on television.

Kahara was repeatedly awarded for her theatre work, including two prizes at the Agency for Cultural Affairs National Arts Festival. She died on 20 February 1991, aged 70.

== Selected filmography ==
- 1946: Morning for the Osone Family
- 1953: An Inlet of Muddy Water
- 1956: Flowing
- 1957: Untamed
- 1957: Black River
- 1958: Anzukko
- 1958: Summer Clouds
- 1959: My Second Brother
- 1959: Floating Weeds
- 1960: When a Woman Ascends the Stairs
- 1960: The Approach of Autumn
- 1960: The Bad Sleep Well
- 1960: The Twilight Story
- 1961: As a Wife, As a Woman
- 1962: A Wanderer's Notebook
- 1976: Lullaby of the Earth
- 1976: Brother and Sister
