= Onna no Koyomi =

- Theatrical release poster
- Directed by: Seiji Hisamatsu
- Written by: Toshirō Ide
- Produced by: Shizuo Sakagami
- Starring: Kinuyo Tanaka; Yōko Sugi; Kyōko Kagawa; Hisao Toake; Masao Mishima
- Cinematography: Hiroshi Suzuki
- Music by: Ichirō Saitō
- Production company: Shintōhō
- Release date: 8 June 1954 (Japan)
- Running time: 100 minutes
- Country: Japan
- Language: Japanese

Onna no Koyomi (Japanese: 女の暦), also known as Five Sisters, is a 1954 Japanese film directed by Seiji Hisamatsu. It was written by Toshirō Ide, based on the short story collection A Calendar (暦, Koyomi) by Sakae Tsuboi. It was entered into the 1955 Cannes Film Festival.

== Cast ==
- Kinuyo Tanaka as Michi Saeki
- Yōko Sugi as Kuniko Hyūga
- Kyōko Kagawa as Mie Hyūga
- Hisao Toake as Manzō Saeki
- Masao Mishima as Sakutarō Sugie
- Yukiko Todoroki as Takako Takagi
- Gen Funabashi as Kyōhei Ishida
- Eiko Miyoshi as Ofuku
- Ranko Hanai as Kayano Sugie
- Toshio Hosokawa as Aoshima
