= The Eternal Breasts =

1955 Japanese film

- Film poster

Japanese name
- Kanji: 乳房よ永遠なれ
- Directed by: Kinuyo Tanaka
- Written by: Sumie Tanaka (screenplay); Akira Wakatsuki (book)
- Produced by: Hideo Koi; Shizuo Sakagami
- Starring: Yumeji Tsukioka; Ryōji Hayama; Masayuki Mori; Yōko Sugi
- Cinematography: Kumenobu Fujioka
- Edited by: Kimihiko Nakamura
- Music by: Takanobu Saitō
- Production company: Nikkatsu
- Distributed by: Nikkatsu
- Release date: 23 November 1955 (Japan)
- Running time: 110 minutes
- Country: Japan
- Language: Japanese

The Eternal Breasts (Japanese: 乳房よ永遠なれ, Hepburn: Chibusa yo eien nare), also titled Forever a Woman, is a 1955 Japanese drama film directed by actress Kinuyo Tanaka. It is based on the life of tanka poet Fumiko Nakajō (1922–1954).

== Plot ==
Unhappily married Fumiko, mother of two children, divorces her drug-addicted husband after an incident which she regards as an act of unfaithfulness, and moves back to her mother. At the same time, she tries to find her voice as a poet, regularly attending a poetry circle, encouraged by her married tutor Hori, whom she loves with a respectful distance. While struggling with the divorce and the fact that she could only take her daughter with her, she is diagnosed with late-stage breast cancer. She undergoes a double mastectomy, which she writes about in a series of widely noticed and prize-winning poems, and tries to live her life as freely as possible and as her illness allows. She has a short affair with journalist Ōtsuki, who writes about her in a newspaper series before she finally dies.

== Cast ==
- Yumeji Tsukioka as Fumiko Shimojō, née Nakajō
- Ryōji Hayama as Akira Ōtsuki
- Junkichi Orimoto as Shigeru Anzai
- Hiroko Kawasaki as Tatsuko
- Shirō Ōsaka as Yoshio
- Ikuko Kimuro as Seiko
- Masayuki Mori as Takashi Hori
- Yōko Sugi as Kinuko, Hori's wife
- Chōko Iida as Hide
- Bokuzen Hidari as Hide's husband
- Tōru Abe as Yamagami
- Fumie Kitahara as Kobayashi
- Kinuyo Tanaka as neighbour's wife
- Yoshiko Tsubouchi as Shirakawa

== Production ==
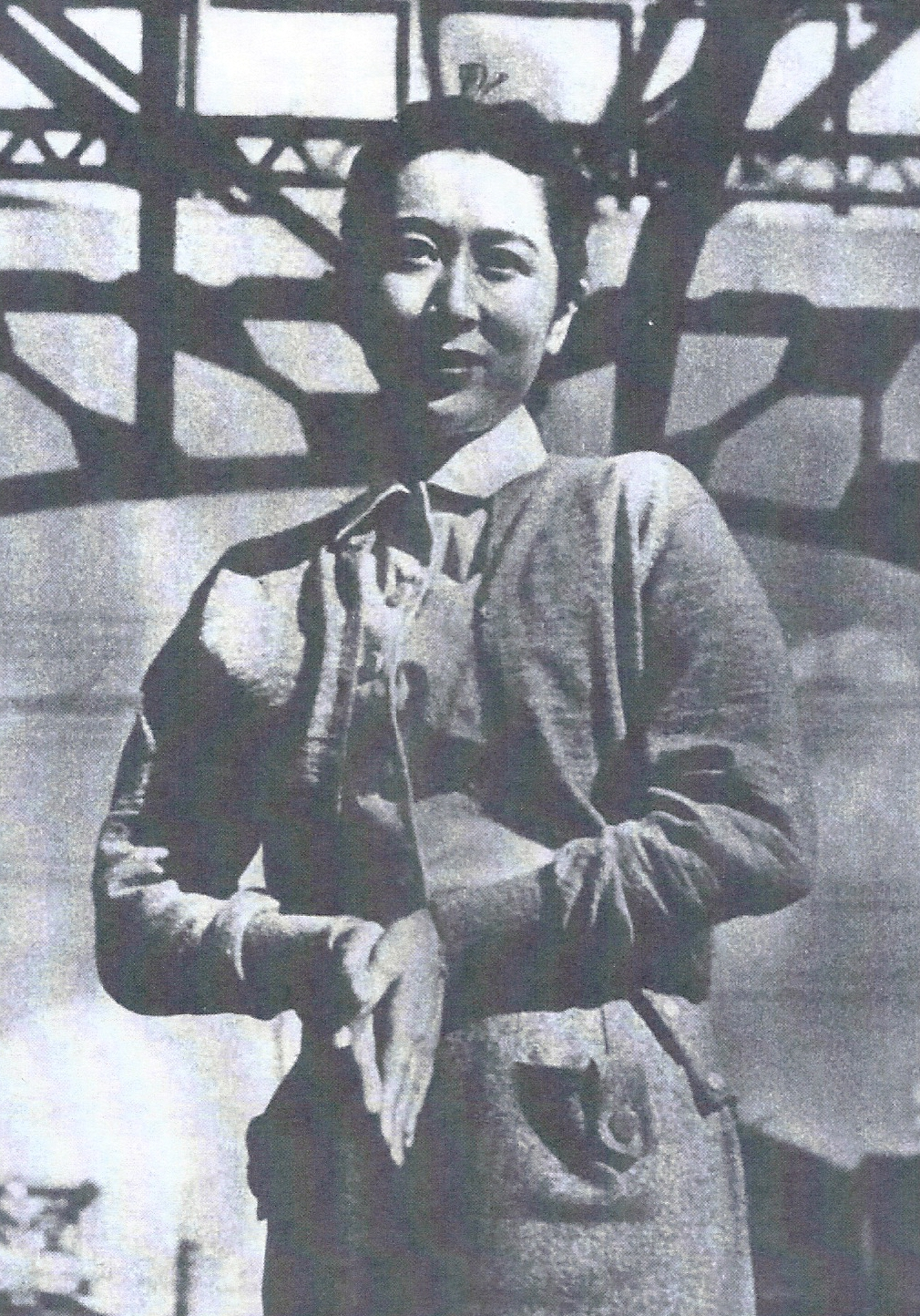
Lead actress Yumeji Tsukioka on location in The Eternal Breasts.

Shot largely on location in Hokkaidō, filming took place a year after the death of Nakajō.

== Reception ==
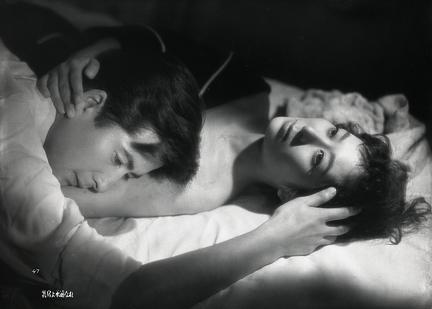
Ryōji Hayama and Yumeji Tsukioka

The Eternal Breasts is unanimously highly regarded for its directorial skills, yet film scholars differ in their evaluation of the themes addressed in the film. While Alejandra Armendáriz-Hernández calls it "a daring depiction of female sexuality […] as well as a powerful instance of women's creativity and self-expression", Alexander Jacoby sees the "feminist and progressive" theme of a woman willingly choosing career over marriage obscured by the film's concentration on her illness, thus shying away from the more controversial implications.

== Legacy ==
The Eternal Breasts has seen repeated screenings at festivals and film museums in the US, in France and in Germany. The British Film Institute included the film in its 2020 The Best Japanese Film of Every Year – from 1925 to Now list.

== Bibliography ==
- González-López, Irene; Smith, Michael, eds. (2018). Tanaka Kinuyo: Nation, Stardom and Female Subjectivity. Edinburgh: Edinburgh University Press. ISBN 978-1-4744-0969-8.
- Berra, John, ed. (2012). Directory of World Cinema: Japan2. Bristol and Chicago: Intellect. ISBN 978-1-84150-551-0.
