= Flowing (1956 film) =

1956 Japanese film

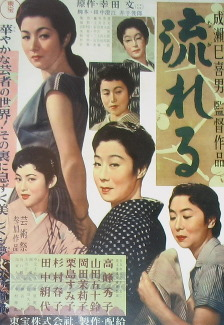
- Japanese theatrical release poster
- Kanji: 流れる
- Directed by: Mikio Naruse
- Written by: Toshirō Ide; Sumie Tanaka; Aya Kōda (novel)
- Produced by: Sanezumi Fujimoto
- Starring: Hideko Takamine; Isuzu Yamada; Mariko Okada; Sumiko Kurishima; Haruko Sugimura; Kinuyo Tanaka
- Cinematography: Masao Tamai
- Edited by: Eiji Ooi
- Music by: Ichirō Saitō
- Production company: Toho
- Distributed by: Toho
- Release date: 20 November 1956 (Japan)
- Running time: 116 minutes
- Country: Japan
- Language: Japanese

Flowing (Japanese: 流れる, Hepburn: Nagareru) is a 1956 Japanese drama film directed by Mikio Naruse. It is based on the novel Nagareru by Aya Kōda.

== Plot ==
Widow Rika starts working as a maid in the okiya (geisha lodging house) of geisha Otsuta, who lives with her daughter Katsuyo, her younger sister Yoneko and Yoneko's child, and geisha Nanako. Of the seven geisha who once worked for Otsuta, only Nanako and Someka are left; a third girl, Namie, has just run away, convinced that she has been tricked out of her share. Otsuta's older sister Otoyo tries to pressure Otsuta into finding a financially secured husband to pay back the loans on the house which the two of them mortgaged together. Ohama, a former geisha sister of Otsuta, tries to help by making contact between her and her nephew's employer Hanayama, a former patron of Otsuta. The situation tightens when Namie's uncle shows up, demanding the money which he thinks his niece is entitled to. Otsuta tries to compensate him with 50,000 yen, half of Hanayama's onetime donation, but he refuses and goes to the police instead, resulting in the questioning of Otsuta and Katsuyo. Eventually Ohama pays for Otsuta's mortgaged house, but only to move the Tsuta House out and open her own restaurant instead. She offers Rika an employment in her future business, but Rika declines. In the final scene, Rika, instructed not to tell anyone of Ohama's plans, watches the unknowing Otsuta giving music lessons to apprentices.

== Cast ==
- Kinuyo Tanaka as Rika, called Oharu
- Isuzu Yamada as Otsuta
- Hideko Takamine as Katsuyo, Otsuta's daughter
- Mariko Okada as Nanako
- Haruko Sugimura as Someka
- Sumiko Kurishima as Ohama
- Chieko Nakakita as Yoneko, Otsuta's younger sister
- Natsuko Kahara as Otoyo, Otsuta's older sister
- Seiji Miyaguchi as Namie's uncle
- Daisuke Katō as Yoneko's ex-husband
- Chiyo Izumi as Namie
- Nobuo Nakamura as doctor
- Noboru Nakaya as Saeki, Ohama's nephew

== Book and film ==
Aya Kōda's novel, which had been published one year prior to the film's release, described the events mainly from the perspective of Rika/Oharu, an educated woman, other than the rather simple character portrayed by Kinuyo Tanaka in the film. Also, the film enlarged the role of Katsuyo, thereby presenting two outside views onto the geisha milieu. Again, the ending differs in book and film: In the book, Rika accepts the offer to manage Otsatu's former house once the women have been removed.

For her book, Kōda had used her own experiences she had made while working as a maid in a geisha house in Tokyo's Yanagibashi district in the early 1950s.

== Release ==
Flowing was released in Japan on 20 November 1956. An English subtitle version was released in the United States on 13 May 1978.

== Legacy ==
Flowing was screened at the Museum of Modern Art in 1985 and at the Harvard Film Archive in 2005 as part of their retrospectives on Mikio Naruse.

== Awards ==
Isuzu Yamada received the 1956 Blue Ribbon Award for Best Actress, the 1956 Mainichi Film Concours For Best Actress (for Flowing, A Cat, Shozo, and Two Women and Boshizō), and the 1956 Kinema Junpo Award for Best Actress (for Flowing and A Cat, Shozo, and Two Women).
