= Emi Ikehata =

Japanese actress (born 1978)

- Born: Emiko Ikehata; March 28, 1978 (age 48); Tokyo, Japan
- Education: Keio University
- Occupation: Actress
- Years active: 2000—2010
- Spouse: Daniel Alexander (m. 2009)
- Relatives: Yūzō Kayama (father); Ken Uehara (grandfather)

Emiko Ikehata (池畑恵美子, Ikehata Emiko), known professionally as Emi Ikehata, is a Japanese former actress, best known for her role as Naoko in The Grudge 3 (2009).

== Early life ==
Emiko Ikehata was born 28 March 1978 to Japanese singer Yūzō Kayama and former actress Megumi Matsumoto. Her paternal grandparents are actors Ken Uehara and Yôko Kozakura. On her father's side, she is a direct descendant of Japanese Court Noble and Politician Iwakura Tomomi. Ikehata has three siblings, including eldest brother Nobuhiro Ikehata, and actors Tetsuo Yamashita and Mayuko Azusa. She studied at Keio University.

== Career ==
During her third year in University, Ikehata was cast as the lead in a student film Himawari (2001), discovering a knack for acting. After graduating Keio University in 2000, Ikehata started out doing Japanese soap operas, including a recurring role in a series called Wipe Your Tears (2000) as schoolteacher Eriko Miyamoto. She also had a bit part in Song of the Canfields (2003), a film based on the single of the same name by Ryoko Moriyama, recounting the events of the Battle of Okinawa, and a supporting role in SF Whipped Cream (2002), a Sci-Fi Comedy by experimental filmmaker Takahisa Zeze.

Wanting to pursue acting in the United States, she immigrated in 2003 and attended the New York Film Academy where she further studied acting, and participated in many indie and student films by other alumni, along with Broadway stage productions. She initially went by her birth name, Emiko Ikehata, for screen credits until she began using her stage name, Emi Ikehata. In 2009, she scored her first leading role in a Hollywood film production in The Grudge 3 (2009) as Naoko, sister of the villain Kayako Saeki, who holds the secret to ending the curse once and for all.

== Filmography ==
Year	Title	Role	Notes
2000	Wipe Your Tears	Eriko Miyamoto	5 episodes
2001	Himawari		Short film
2001	Tuesday Suspense Theater	Ayako Nakamura	Unknown episodes
2001	The Monday Night Mystery Theater	Yoshiko Sasaki	Unknown episodes
2002	SF Whipped Cream	Kazuu	TV movie
2003	Song of the Canefields	The Bride	TV movie
2004	A Light in the Abyss	Camila	Short film
2004	Untitled: A Mystery	Takara	
2004	Dream Haircut	The Student / Hairdresser	Short film
2005	Between the Frames		Short film
2007	Wake Up and Waltz	Saki	
2008	Rich Traditions	Penny	Short film
2009	The Grudge 3	Naoko	
2010	The Hirosaki Players	Aya	Short film
????	The Winter Butterfly	Yukiko	Unreleased
