= Yōjirō Ishizaka =

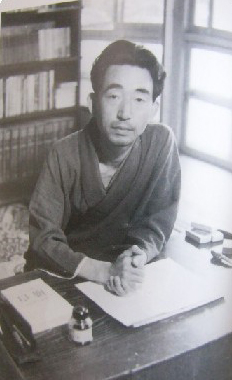
Ishizaka ca. 1950

Yōjirō Ishizaka (石坂 洋次郎, Ishizaka Yōjirō; 15 [or 25] January 1900 – 7 October 1986) was a Japanese writer of short stories and novels.

== Biography ==
Born in the Daikancho quarter of Hirosaki, Aomori Prefecture, Ishizaka entered Keio University in 1919. Upon graduating from the Faculty of Letters, he took a position at Hirosaki Girls' High School. Later, he became a teacher at Akita Prefectural Yokote Girls' High School and Akita Prefectural Yokote Junior High School.

In 1939, he moved to Tokyo to concentrate on his literary work. During World War II, he served as a war correspondent in the Philippines.

His 1947 novel Blue Mountain Range (青い山脈, Aoi sanmyaku) portrayed the emancipated post-war youth through the relationships of a group of high school students.

While widely popular in Japan, with his writings repeatedly made into films, only a small portion of his writings have been translated and published in English.

== Writings (selected) ==
- Go to See a Sea (1927)
- Wakai Hito (serialised 1933, book 1937)
- Doku-ganryu masamune (1942) (novel)
- Blue Mountain Range (青い山脈, Aoi sanmyaku) (1947) (novel)
- Ishinaka sensei gyōjōki (1948–54) (short story series)
- Wakai hito (1952) (novel)
- Kuchizuke, III: Onna doshi (1955) (story)
- Nikui mono (1957) (story)
- Hi no ataru sakamichi (1958) (novel)
- Wakai musumetachi (1958) (story)
- Suzukake no sanpomichi (1959) (novel)
- Aruhi watashi wa (1959) (novel)
- Kiri no naka no shojo (1959)
- Kawano hotoride (1962) (story)
- Izuko e (1966) (story)
- Wakai musume ga ippai (1966) (story)
- Dare no isu? (1968) (novel)
- Hi no ataru sakamichi (1975) (novel)
- Aitsu to watashi (1976) (novel)
- Wakai hito (1977) (novel)

== Film adaptions (selected) ==
- 1937: Young People (Wakai hito)
- 1949: Aoi sanmyaku
- 1950: Conduct Report on Professor Ishinaka (Ishinaka sensei gyōjōki)
- 1957: Zoku aoi sanmyaku Yukiko no maki
- 1956: The Baby Carriage (Ubaguruma)
- 1958: A Slope in the Sun (Hi no ataru sakamichi)
