= Yōko Sugi =

Japanese actress (1928–2019)

- 杉葉子
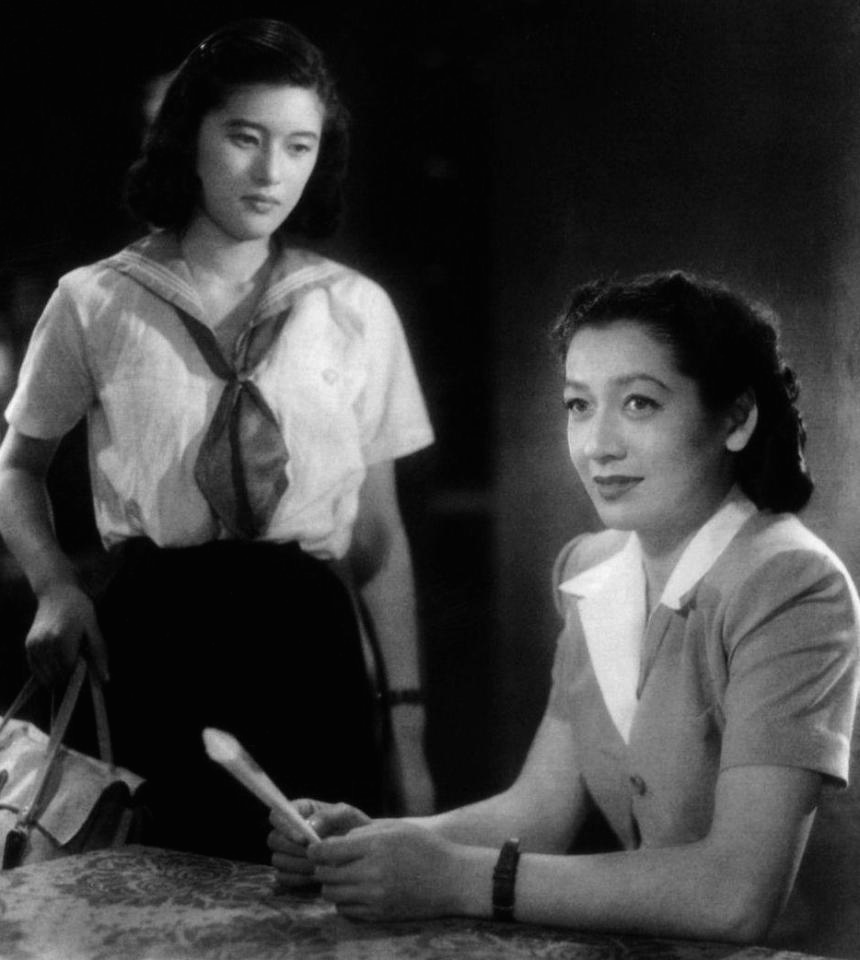
- Sugi (left) and Setsuko Hara in Aoi sanmyaku
- Born: October 28, 1928; Koishikawa, Bunkyō ward, Tokyo, Japan
- Died: 15 May 2019 (aged 90); Tokyo, Japan
- Occupation: Actress

Yōko Sugi (杉葉子, Sugi Yōko; 8 October 1928 – 15 May 2019) was a Japanese actress mainly active in the 1950s, who appeared in films of Mikio Naruse, Kinuyo Tanaka and Tadashi Imai.

== Biography ==
Sugi was born on 28 October 1928 in what is now Bunkyō ward, Tokyo, Japan. In 1945 she graduated from a Japanese high school in Shanghai.

After returning to Japan in 1947, Sugi auditioned at Toho studio's "New Face" competition and received a contract. She gave her debut in Tadashi Imai's 1949 Aoi sanmyaku, and performed in several other coming of age films. She repeatedly appeared in films of Mikio Naruse such as Repast, Husband and Wife (Sugi's only starring role in a Naruse film, replacing Setsuko Hara) and Sound of the Mountain, and in Kinuyo Tanaka's The Eternal Breasts and The Moon Has Risen.

In 1962, Sugi married an American, retired from the entertainment industry, and moved to the United States, where she worked at the New Otani Hotel in Los Angeles. Occasionally returning to Japan, she appeared in films like Shirō Toyoda's The Twilight Years. She served as a Japanese Cultural Envoy to the United States for the Agency for Cultural Affairs in 2005.

Sugi moved back to Japan in 2017. She died on 15 May 2019 of colon cancer in Tokyo.

== Filmography (selected) ==
- Aoi sanmyaku (1949)
- Conduct Report on Professor Ishinaka (1950)
- Repast (1951)
- Tokyo Sweetheart (1952)
- Husband and Wife (1953)
- Sound of the Mountain (1954)
- Onna no Koyomi (1954)
- The Eternal Breasts (1955)
- The Moon Has Risen (1955)
- A Wife's Heart (1956)
- A Rainbow Plays in my Heart (1957)
- The Twilight Years (1973)
- Picture Bride (1994)
