= Yoru no Kamome =

1957 film

- Film poster
- Directed by: Shin Saburi
- Written by: Sumie Tanaka
- Produced by: Eizaburô Adachi
- Starring: Michiyo Aratama; Jun Tazaki; Shūji Sano; Shin Saburi; Asami Kuji; Kenji Sahara; Momoko Kôchi
- Cinematography: Isamu Ashida
- Music by: Koji Taku
- Production company: Toho
- Distributed by: Toho
- Release date: 10 August 1957 (Japan)
- Running time: 100 minutes
- Country: Japan
- Language: Japanese

Yoru no Kamome (Japanese: 夜の鴎; lit. "Night Seagull") is a 1957 Japanese film directed by Shin Saburi and produced by Eizaburô Adachi. The music for the film was composed by Koji Taku. The cinematographer was Isamu Ashida. The art direction was provided by Keisuke Kitagawa. The screenplay was written by Sumie Tanaka, who "excelled at adapting screenplays," especially compared to her contemporaries.

== Cast ==
- Michiyo Aratama
- Jun Tazaki
- Shūji Sano
- Shin Saburi
- Asami Kuji
- Kenji Sahara
- Momoko Kôchi
