= Untamed (1957 film) =

1957 Japanese film

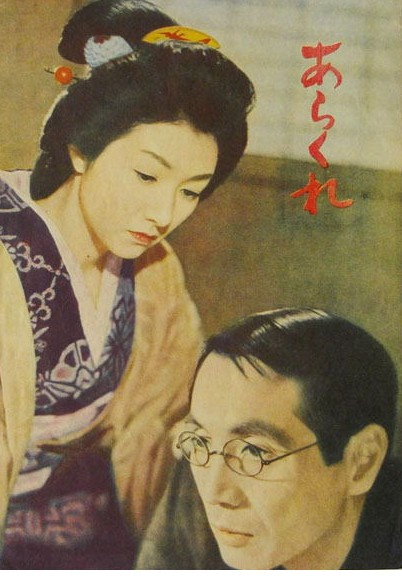
- Film poster
- Kanji: あらくれ
- Directed by: Mikio Naruse
- Written by: Yōko Mizuki
- Based on: Rough Living (Arakure); 1915 novel by Shūsei Tokuda
- Produced by: Tomoyuki Tanaka
- Starring: Hideko Takamine
- Cinematography: Masao Tamai
- Edited by: Eiji Ooi
- Music by: Ichirō Saitō
- Production company: Toho
- Distributed by: Toho
- Release date: 22 May 1957 (Japan)
- Running time: 121 minutes
- Country: Japan
- Language: Japanese

Untamed a.k.a. Untamed Woman (Japanese: あらくれ, Hepburn: Arakure) is a 1957 Japanese drama film directed by Mikio Naruse. It is based on a novel by Shūsei Tokuda.

== Plot summary ==
A woman marries, gives birth to a stillborn child, and divorces, falls in love with a hotel-keeper, only to find herself subordinated to his drive for success, takes up with a tailor who cannot console himself with her strong personality.

== Cast ==
- Hideko Takamine as Ōshima
- Ken Uehara as Tsuru
- Masayuki Mori as Hamaya
- Daisuke Katō as Onoda
- Eijirō Tōno as Ōshima's father
- Seiji Miyaguchi as Sotaro
- Tatsuya Nakadai as Kimura
- Teruko Kishi as Ōshima's mother
- Chieko Nakakita as Osuzu
- Takeshi Sakamoto as Kisuke
- Takashi Shimura as owner of the rice mill
- Mitsuko Miura as Oyuri
- Natsuko Kahara as Otoku

== Reception ==
Donald Richie and Joseph L. Anderson found in protagonist Ōshima "one of the strongest characters Naruse ever created", but also an out-of-place "postwar strain of neuroticism" in Hideko Takamine's interpretation.

== Awards ==
- Mainichi Film Award for Best Actress Hideko Takamine (for Untamed and Times of Joy and Sorrow)

== Background ==
Untamed was Japan's submission to the 30th Academy Awards for the Academy Award for Best Foreign Language Film, but was not accepted as a nominee.

== See also ==
- List of submissions to the 30th Academy Awards for Best Foreign Language Film
- List of Japanese submissions for the Academy Award for Best Foreign Language Film
