= Sudden Rain =

1956 Japanese film

Shūu
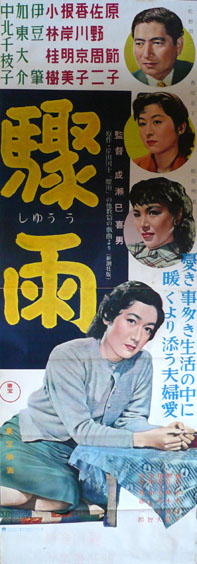
- Japanese movie poster
- 驟雨
- Directed by: Mikio Naruse
- Written by: Yōko Mizuki; Kunio Kishida (play)
- Produced by: Sanezumi Fujimoto; Keikichi Kakeshita
- Starring: Setsuko Hara; Shūji Sano
- Cinematography: Masao Tamai
- Edited by: Eiji Ooi
- Music by: Ichirō Saitō
- Production company: Toho
- Distributed by: Toho
- Release date: 14 January 1956 (Japan)
- Running time: 90 minutes
- Country: Japan
- Language: Japanese

Sudden Rain (Japanese: 驟雨, Hepburn: Shūu) is a 1956 Japanese comedy-drama film directed by Mikio Naruse. It is based on a play by Kunio Kishida.

== Plot ==
The marriage of Fumiko and Ryōtarō Namiki has gone stale, with both of them constantly arguing over what to do on a day off, or about her cutting out cooking recipes from the newspaper before he finishes reading it. Their animosities are witnessed by Fumiko's niece Ayako, who pays a visit to complain about her own husband's inattentiveness, and their new neighbours, the Imasatos. When Ryōtarō's company announces the dismissal of some of their employees, a group of his colleagues visit him at home and offer him to become their partner in a bar financed with their severance pay, with Fumiko serving the bar's guests. Ryōtarō throws them out and has an argument with Fumiko, declaring that he does not want his wife to take up a job. The couple contemplates a divorce and Ryōtarō's return to his hometown to work on his family's farm. The next morning, a children's balloon falls into their backyard, and Fumiko and Ryōtarō become engaged in a defiant ball throwing game, which is watched by the neighbours.

== Cast ==
- Setsuko Hara as Fumiko Namiki
- Shūji Sano as Ryōtarō Namiki
- Kyōko Kagawa as Ayako
- Keiju Kobayashi as Mr. Imasato
- Akemi Negishi as Mrs. Imasato
- Chieko Nakakita as Mrs. Kurobayashi
- Daisuke Katō as Kawakami

== Reception ==
Naruse biographer Catherine Russell called Sudden Rain an "extraordinarily bleak film", which nonetheless "offers a poetic treatment of a dismal situation". Dan Sallitt saw the film's depiction of the marital conflict as "characteristically brutal and devastating" for Naruse, despite the "light-hearted formal play".
