= A Wife's Heart =

1956 Japanese film

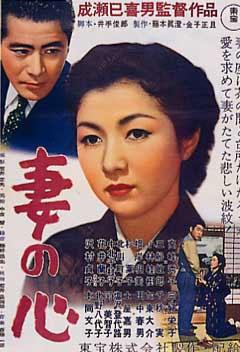
- Original Japanese movie poster
- Kanji: 妻の心
- Directed by: Mikio Naruse
- Written by: Toshirō Ide
- Produced by: Sanezumi Fujimoto; Masakatsu Kaneko
- Starring: Hideko Takamine; Toshiro Mifune; Yoko Sugi
- Cinematography: Masao Tamai
- Edited by: Eiji Ooi
- Music by: Ichirō Saitō
- Production company: Toho
- Distributed by: Toho
- Release date: 3 May 1956 (Japan)
- Running time: 98 minutes
- Country: Japan
- Language: Japanese

A Wife's Heart (Japanese: 妻の心, Hepburn: Tsuma no kokoro) is a 1956 Japanese drama film directed by Mikio Naruse.

== Plot ==
Kiyoko lives with her husband Shinji and his mother in the family's house, where the couple runs a not-too-successful food store. Although their marriage is not happy, it is pragmatic, and both agree on the plan to open an additional coffee shop in the house, despite the mother's objections. Kiyoko asks her friend Sumiko's brother Kenkichi, a bank clerk, for a loan, which he approves. Shortly after, Shinji's older brother Zenichi loses his job. Together with his wife and mother, Zenichi puts pressure on Kiyoko and Shinji to give him the money to start his own business. Although both Kiyoko and Shinji are against Zenichi's plan, they slowly retreat. Kiyoko feels humiliated when she is told that Shinji visited a hot spring with a friend and two geisha. At the same time, she and Kenkichi develop a mutual affection, which they never openly acknowledge. When Shinji learns that Kiyoko was seen with Kenkichi in public, he offers to let her go, but Kiyoko eventually stays with her husband, affirming that they should carry on with their project to open a café.

== Cast ==
- Hideko Takamine as Kiyoko
- Keiju Kobayashi as Shinji
- Toshiro Mifune as Kenkichi
- Yōko Sugi as Yumiko, Kenkichi's sister
- Eiko Miyoshi as Shinji's mother
- Minoru Chiaki as Zenichi, Shinji's brother
- Chieko Nakakita as Kaoru, Zenichi's wife
- Akemi Negishi as Sumiko, Shinji's sister
- Haruo Tanaka as Kunio
- Ranko Hanai as Kunio's wife and madame
- Machiko Kitagawa as geisha
- Toki Shiozawa as geisha
- Sadako Sawamura as Namiko
- Daisuke Katō as chef
- Yoshio Tsuchiya

== Legacy ==
A Wife's Heart was shown in the U.S. (including the Museum of Modern Art) as part of a Naruse retrospective in 1985, organised by the Kawakita Memorial Film Institute and film scholar Audie Bock.
