= Yearning (1964 film) =

1964 Japanese film

- Japanese film poster
- Directed by: Mikio Naruse
- Written by: Zenzō Matsuyama
- Produced by: Sanezumi Fujimoto
- Starring: Hideko Takamine; Yūzō Kayama
- Cinematography: Jun Yasumoto
- Edited by: Eiji Ooi
- Music by: Ichirō Saitō
- Production company: Toho
- Distributed by: Toho
- Release dates: 15 January 1964 (Japan); 23 October 1964 (U.S.)
- Running time: 98 minutes
- Country: Japan
- Language: Japanese

Yearning (Japanese: 乱れる, Hepburn: Midareru; lit. "Confused") is a 1964 Japanese drama film directed by Mikio Naruse and starring Hideko Takamine and Yūzō Kayama. The story centers on a war widow whose deceased husband's family plans to drive her out of the shop which she runs in the family's house.

== Plot ==
For 18 years, war widow Reiko has been running a grocery shop in the house of her deceased husband's family. Now a new supermarket threatens to put the store out of business, so Reiko's sisters-in-law conspire to turn the shop into a supermarket as well and get rid of her. The only family member siding with Reiko is her brother-in-law, 25-year-old Kōji, who regularly gets into drunken fights. He eventually confesses to the 12 years older Reiko that he has always loved her. She rejects him on the grounds that she only cares for him as a family member.

Reiko finally decides that she doesn't want to stand in the way of the sister's plans anymore and return home to her family. Kōji follows her onto the long train ride. On the way, she softens and they disembark for a country inn, where they can talk. He resumes his approaches, but at the last minute, she can't face intimacy. He storms out and gets drunk, later calling Reiko up saying that he is going back home. In the morning, Reiko sees him being carried into the village on a stretcher, and learns that he died falling from a cliff. She runs after the carriers, but then stops, her face blank.

== Cast ==
- Hideko Takamine as Reiko Morita
- Yūzō Kayama as Kōji Morita
- Mitsuko Kusabue as Hisako Morizono
- Yumi Shirakawa as Takako Morita
- Mie Hama as Ruriko
- Kazuo Kitamura as Morizono
- Aiko Mimasu as Shizu Morita
- Chieko Nakakita as Mrs. Kaga

== Production ==
Yearning was based on an original screenplay by Takamine's husband Zenzō Matsuyama which had been filmed as the television drama Shigure the previous year.

== Legacy ==
Yearning was screened at the Museum of Modern Art in 1985 and at the Harvard Film Archive in 2005 as part of their retrospectives on Mikio Naruse, and at the Cinémathèque Française in 2017.

== Awards ==
- 1964: Locarno International Film Festival Best Actress Award for Hideko Takamine
