= Adolescence Part II =

1953 film by Ishirō Honda

- Original theatrical release poster
- Directed by: Ishirō Honda
- Written by: Haruo Umeda; Toshirō Ide
- Produced by: Toho Company
- Starring: Kyōko Aoyama; Ikichi Ishii; Keiju Kobayashi; Fuyuki Murakami; Ren Yamamoto
- Production company: Toho
- Release date: July 1, 1953 (Japan)
- Language: Japanese

Adolescence Part II (Japanese: 続思春期, Hepburn: Zoku shishunki) is a 1953 Japanese film directed by Ishirō Honda. It is a sequel to the 1952 film Shishunki, directed by Seiji Maruyama.

== Cast ==
- Kyōko Aoyama
- Ikichi Ishii
- Keiju Kobayashi
- Fuyuki Murakami
- Ren Yamamoto
- Akira Kubo
- Hisao Toake
- Noriko Honma
- Eitaro Ozawa
- Sachiko Murase
- Chieko Nakakita
