= The Moon Has Risen =

1955 Japanese film

- Film poster
- Directed by: Kinuyo Tanaka
- Written by: Ryosuke Saito; Yasujirō Ozu
- Produced by: Eisei Koi
- Starring: Chishū Ryū; Shūji Sano; Hisako Yamane; Yōko Sugi; Mie Kitahara
- Cinematography: Shigeyoshi Mine
- Edited by: Mitsuo Kondo
- Music by: Takanobu Saitō
- Production company: Nikkatsu
- Distributed by: Nikkatsu
- Release date: 8 January 1955 (Japan)
- Running time: 102 minutes
- Country: Japan
- Language: Japanese

The Moon Has Risen (Japanese: 月は上りぬ, Hepburn: Tsuki wa noborinu) is a 1955 Japanese romantic comedy film and the second film directed by Kinuyo Tanaka.

== Plot ==
Setsuko and her older sister Ayako live in their father's house in Nara. Ayako's aunt, who is worried about Ayako's marriage prospects as she grows older, tries to set Ayako up with a bank manager's son. Setsuko is determined not to see her sister enter into an unhappy marriage, and sets about trying to spark a love interest between Ayako and Amamiya, a visiting friend from Ayako's past. Setsuko bounces her ideas off of Yasui, a family friend, and enlists his help, ultimately aiming to get Ayako and Amamiya to go for a moonlit walk together.

== Cast ==
- Chishū Ryū as Mokichi Asai
- Shūji Sano as Shunsuke Takasu
- Hisako Yamane as Chizuru
- Yōko Sugi as Ayako
- Mie Kitahara as Setsuko
- Kō Mishima as Amamiya
- Shōji Yasui as Shōji
- Kinuyo Tanaka as Yoneya

== Background ==
The screenplay was based on an unused script gifted to Tanaka by Yasujirō Ozu. Contemporary critics noted resemblances to Ozu's films like the use of low-angle shots or the casting of Chishū Ryū.

The Moon Has Risen was the screen debut of Shōji Yasui (born Masao Yomo), who took his stage name from his character in this film.

== Legacy ==
The 4K restored version of The Moon Has Risen was selected for screening at the Classics section at the 2021 Cannes Film Festival.
