= Aoi sanmyaku =

- Theatrical release poster for Part One
- Kanji: 青い山脈
- Revised Hepburn: Aoi Sanmyaku
- Directed by: Tadashi Imai
- Screenplay by: Tadashi Imai; Toshirō Ide
- Based on: Blue Mountain Range by Yōjirō Ishizaka
- Produced by: Sanezumi Fujimoto
- Starring: Setsuko Hara; Ryō Ikebe; Michiyo Kogure; Yōko Sugi
- Cinematography: Asakazu Nakai
- Music by: Ryōichi Hattori
- Production companies: Fujimoto Production; Toho
- Distributed by: Toho
- Release dates: July 19, 1949 (Part One); July 26, 1949 (Part Two)
- Running time: 91 minutes (Part One); 91 minutes (Part Two)
- Country: Japan
- Language: Japanese

Aoi sanmyaku (Japanese: 青い山脈; lit. Blue Mountain Range) is a 1949 two-part black-and-white Japanese film directed by Tadashi Imai. It is based on Yōjirō Ishizaka's novel of the same name, which was first published in serialised form in 1947.

== Plot ==
After defending Shinko, student at a rural girls' high school, for seeing a young man from the village, teacher Yukiko, who has just been transferred from Tokyo, finds herself in opposition to the conservative faculty and villagers.

== Cast ==
Actor	Role
Setsuko Hara	Yukiko Shimazaki
Ryō Ikebe	Rokusuke Kaneya
Michiyo Kogure	Umetaro/Tora Sasai
Yōko Sugi	Shinko Terazawa
Ichiro Ryuzaki	Tamao Numata
Setsuko Wakayama	Kazuko Sasai
Kamatari Fujiwara	Okamoto-san

== Production and legacy ==
Aoi sanmyaku was released in two parts, with Part One being released on July 19, 1949, and Part Two one week later; the two films were highly successful both with the audience and the critics.

The film's popular theme song was sung by Ichiro Fujiyama and Mitsue Nara. Ishizaka's novel was adapted again in 1957, 1975 and 1988.
