= Akemi Negishi =

Japanese actress (1934–2008)

- 根岸 明美
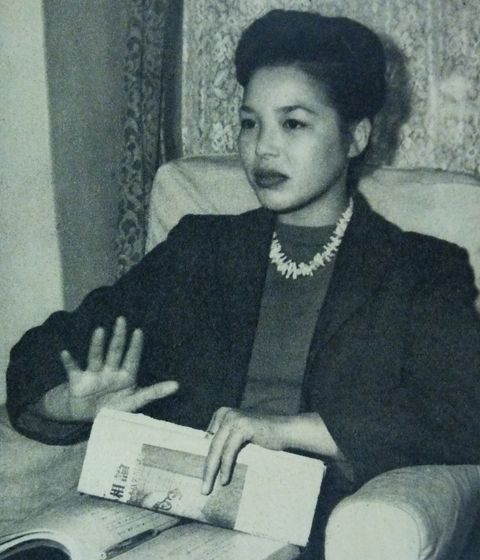
- Negishi in 1952
- Born: 26 March 1934; Minato, Tokyo, Japan
- Died: 11 March 2008 (aged 73)
- Occupation: Actress
- Years active: 1948–1993
- Known for: Anatahan; Half Human; King Kong vs. Godzilla
- Height: 166 cm (5 ft 5 in)

Akemi Negishi (根岸明美, Negishi Akemi; 26 March 1934 – 11 March 2008) was a Japanese actress.

== Film career ==
Tokyo-born Akemi Negishi came to the attention of international audiences when she starred in the US/Japanese co-production Anatahan, her debut film. Josef von Sternberg directed the tale of shipwrecked Japanese soldiers who refused to believe that World War II had ended six years after the bombing of Hiroshima.

Negishi made several films with the acclaimed Japanese film director Akira Kurosawa, including Donzoko (The Lower Depths), Dodesukaden, and Ikimono no kiroku (I Live in Fear). Negishi also had a supporting role in Shurayukihime (Lady Snowblood), which was reportedly one of the main inspirations for Quentin Tarantino's film Kill Bill. Other credits included Tokyo no kyujitsu (Tokyo Holiday), Half Human: The Story of the Abominable Snowman (aka Half Human, with John Carradine), King Kong vs. Godzilla and Kaidan hebi-onna (Snake Woman's Curse). Her last film role was in Barameraba in 2005.

== Death ==
She died from ovarian cancer, aged 73, in Kawasaki, Japan in 2008.

== Partial filmography ==
- Anatahan (1953) – Keiko Kusakabe, the 'Queen Bee'
- Akasen kichi (1953) – Yukiko
- Saraba Rabauru (1954) – Kimu
- Mako osorubeshi (1954)
- Jû jin yuki otoko (1955) – Chika, a villager
- Asunaro monogatari (1955) – Yukie
- I Live in Fear (1955) – Asako Kuribayashi
- Shūu (1956) – Hinako
- Ankokugai (1956) – Natsue
- Kon'yaku sanbagarasu (1956)
- Tsuma no kokoro (1956) – Sumiko
- Arashi no naka no otoko (1957) – Okon
- A Rainbow Plays in My Heart (1957) – Atsuko Shimada
- The Lower Depths (1957) – Osen the prostitute
- Song for a Bride (1958)
- A Holiday in Tokyo (1958) – ballet dancer
- Half Human: The Story of the Abominable Snowman (1959) – mountain girl
- Happiness of Us Alone (1961)
- King Kong vs. Godzilla (1962) – Chikiro's mother (dancing girl)
- Arashi wo yobu jûhachinin (1963) – Hisako Murata
- Bôsu o tosê (1963)
- Zûzûshii yatsu (1964) – Kiriko
- Zoku zûzûshii yatsu (1964) – Kiriko
- Zoku kôkô san'nensei (1964) – Yasuko Hanai
- Nemuri Kyôshirô: Joyôken (1964) – Seiga the Medium / Kunoichi
- Red Beard (1965) – Okuni
- Ore ni tsuite koi! (1965)
- Buraikan jingi (1965) – Tokuko Kumagai
- Kigeki: Kyûkô ressha (1967)
- Ârappoi no ha gômen dazê (1967)
- Kaidan hebi-onna (1968) – Masae Ônuma, landlord's wife
- Kemeko no uta (1968) – Fumi
- Maruhi joshidaisei: Ninshin chûzetsu (1969)
- Denki kurage (1970) – Tomi, Yumi's mother
- Onna-tarashi no teiô (1970) – Cecile Hanada
- Shibire Kurage (1970) – Keiko
- Dodes'ka-den (1970) – good-looking housewife
- Asobi (1971) – boy's mother
- Joshû 701-gô: Sasori (1972) – Otsuka
- Onna ikitemasu: Sakariba wataridori (1972) – Harue
- Sex & Fury (1973) – Ogin Shitateya
- Yasagure anego den: Sôkatsu rinchi (1973) – Osada
- Lady Snowblood (1973) – Tajire no Okiku
- Female Prisoner Scorpion: 701's Grudge Song (1973) – Prison guard Minamimura
- Jyûgun ianfu (1974) – Kura
- Hatsukoi (1975) – Michiko Matsumiya
- Kamome-yo, kirameku umi o mitaka/meguri ai (1975)
- Ai to makoto: Kanketsu-hen (1976)
- The Life of Chikuzan (1977) – Tami
- Kiken na kankei (1978) – Masae Miyakawa
- Orion no satsui yori – Joji no houteishiki (1978) – the mother
- Motto shinayaka ni, motto shitataka ni (1979)
- Kôsatsu (1979) – Hatsuko
- Mo hozue wa tsukanai (1979) – Mariko's mother
- Hadaka no taisho horo-ki: Yamashita Kiyoshi monogatari (1981)
- Enrai (1981) – Mother of Hirotsugu
- Karuizawa fujin (1982) – Yôko / Keiko's niece
- Chichi to ko (1983) – Yoshie Kudo
- Sasameyuki (1983) – Mrs. Shimozuma
- Location (1984) – Umeko
- Shikibu Monogatari (1990) – Fuji
- Rakuyô (1992) – Yamashita's wife
