= Sound of the Mountain =

1954 Japanese film

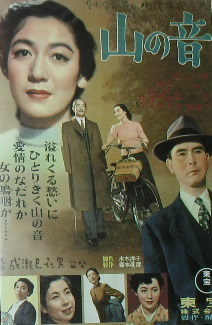
- Theatrical release poster
- Directed by: Mikio Naruse
- Written by: Yoko Mizuki; Yasunari Kawabata (novel)
- Produced by: Sanezumi Fujimoto
- Starring: Setsuko Hara; So Yamamura; Ken Uehara; Yoko Sugi
- Cinematography: Masao Tamai
- Edited by: Eiji Ooi (credited as Hideji Ooi)
- Music by: Ichirō Saitō
- Production company: Toho
- Distributed by: Toho
- Release date: 15 January 1954 (Japan)
- Running time: 95 minutes
- Country: Japan
- Language: Japanese

Sound of the Mountain (Japanese: 山の音, Hepburn: Yama no oto) is a 1954 Japanese drama film directed by Mikio Naruse. It is based on the novel The Sound of the Mountain by Nobel Prize winner Yasunari Kawabata. Naruse declared Sound of the Mountain one of his favourites of his films.

== Plot ==
Shingo, an aging businessman, sees the marriage of his son Shuichi and his daughter-in-law Kikuko, who live in the same household, fall apart due to Shuichi's coldness and adulterous behaviour. Flattered by Kikuko's overt adoration for him, he tries to act as a cornerstone for her. His own daughter Fusako, who left her husband and moved back into her parents' home with her children, blames Shingo for her arranged and failed marriage and for his preference of Kikuko over her. Shingo accompanies Kikuko to a hospital visit, only to learn later that she aborted the child she expected from Shuichi. A secretary from Shingo's company helps him to find Kinu, Shuichi's mistress and an independent businesswoman, who tells him of his son's abusive behaviour. Kikuko finally decides to divorce her husband and, meeting Shingo in a park, tells her father-in-law that she wants to try to live a life on her own.

== Cast ==
- Setsuko Hara as Kikuko Ogata
- Sō Yamamura as Shingo Ogata
- Ken Uehara as Shuichi Ogata
- Yōko Sugi as Hideko Tanizaki
- Teruko Nagaoka as Yasuko
- Yatsuko Tan'ami as Ikeda
- Chieko Nakakita as Fusako Aihara
- Rieko Sumi as Kinuko (Kinu)

== Themes ==
Naruse biographer Catherine Russell sees Sound of the Mountain as a woman's film, as it reduces the book's perspective of Shingo in favour of the female characters who, with the exception of the passive Kikuko, act outspoken and independently, "trying to make their way in a world in which men like Shuichi have been psychologically destroyed by the war". The last scene suggests the possibility of change for Kikuko, achieving a positive resolution of her problems.

== Legacy ==
Sound of the Mountain was screened at the Berkeley Art Museum and Pacific Film Archive in 1981, at the Museum of Modern Art in 1985 and at the Harvard Film Archive in 2005 as part of their retrospectives on Mikio Naruse.

== Awards ==
- 1954: Mainichi Film Award for Best Actor Sō Yamamura (for Sound of the Mountain and Kuroi ushio)
