= Mieko Takamine =

Japanese actress and singer

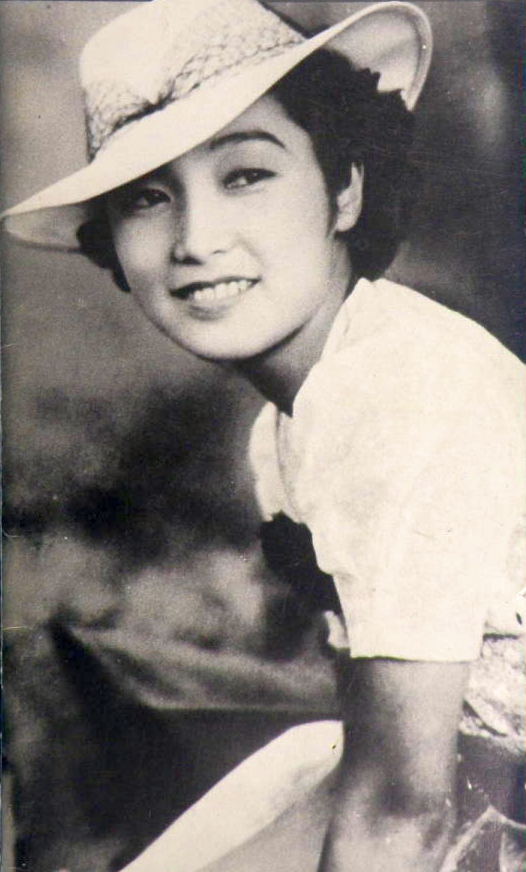
- Born: 2 December 1918; Minato-ku, Tokyo, Japan
- Died: 27 May 1990 (aged 71); Tokyo, Japan
- Occupations: Actress, Singer
- Years active: 1936–1990
- Spouse: Takeyuki Suzuki (1946 – )

Mieko Takamine (高峰三枝子, Takamine Mieko) (2 December 1918 – 27 May 1990) was a Japanese actress and singer.

== Biography ==
Mieko Takamine was born the eldest daughter of famous chikuzen biwa player and teacher Chikufu Takamine. She gave her acting debut in the 1936 film Kimi yo takarakani utae, produced by the Shochiku studios, to which she would remain affiliated throughout her career, although she would also occasionally appear in productions of other companies after the war. Her first released record as a singer was the theme song for the film Hotaru no hikari (1938), and she soon established herself as a "singing movie star".

Takamine starred in films of Japan's most notable directors, including Hiroshi Shimizu, Yasujirō Ozu, Mikio Naruse and Keisuke Kinoshita.

== Selected filmography ==
=== Films ===
- The Lights of Asakusa (1937) Dir. Yasujirō Shimazu
- The Masseurs and a Woman (1938) Dir. Hiroshi Shimizu
- Warm Current (1939) Dir. Kōzaburō Yoshimura
- Nobuko (1940) Dir. Hiroshi Shimizu
- Brothers and Sisters of the Toda Family (1941) Dir. Yasujirō Ozu
- The 47 Ronin (uncredited) (1941) Dir. Kenji Mizoguchi
- Once More (1947) Dir. Heinosuke Gosho
- Dancing Girl (1951), dir. Mikio Naruse
- Wife (1953) Dir. Mikio Naruse
- The Garden of Women (1954) Dir. Keisuke Kinoshita
- Elegy of the North (1957) Dir. Heinosuke Gosho
- Love Under the Crucifix (1962)
- The Sands of Kurobe (1968) Dir. Kei Kumai
- The Inugamis (1976) Dir. Kon Ichikawa
- Queen Bee (1978) Dir. Kon Ichikawa
- Hi no Tori (1978) Dir. Kon Ichikawa
- Sanada Yukimura no Bōryaku (1979) Dir. Sadao Nakajima
- Tempyō no Iraka (1980) Dir. Kei Kumai

=== Television ===
- Monkey (1978)
- Ōoku (1983)
- Hissatsu Watashinin (1983)

== Awards ==
In 1976, Takamine won the Best Supporting Actress award at the 19th Blue Ribbon Awards for her role in The Inugamis (1976). In 1985, she was awarded the Medal of Purple Ribbon and a special Mainichi Film Award for her longtime achievements as a performer.
