= Wife (film) =

1953 Japanese film

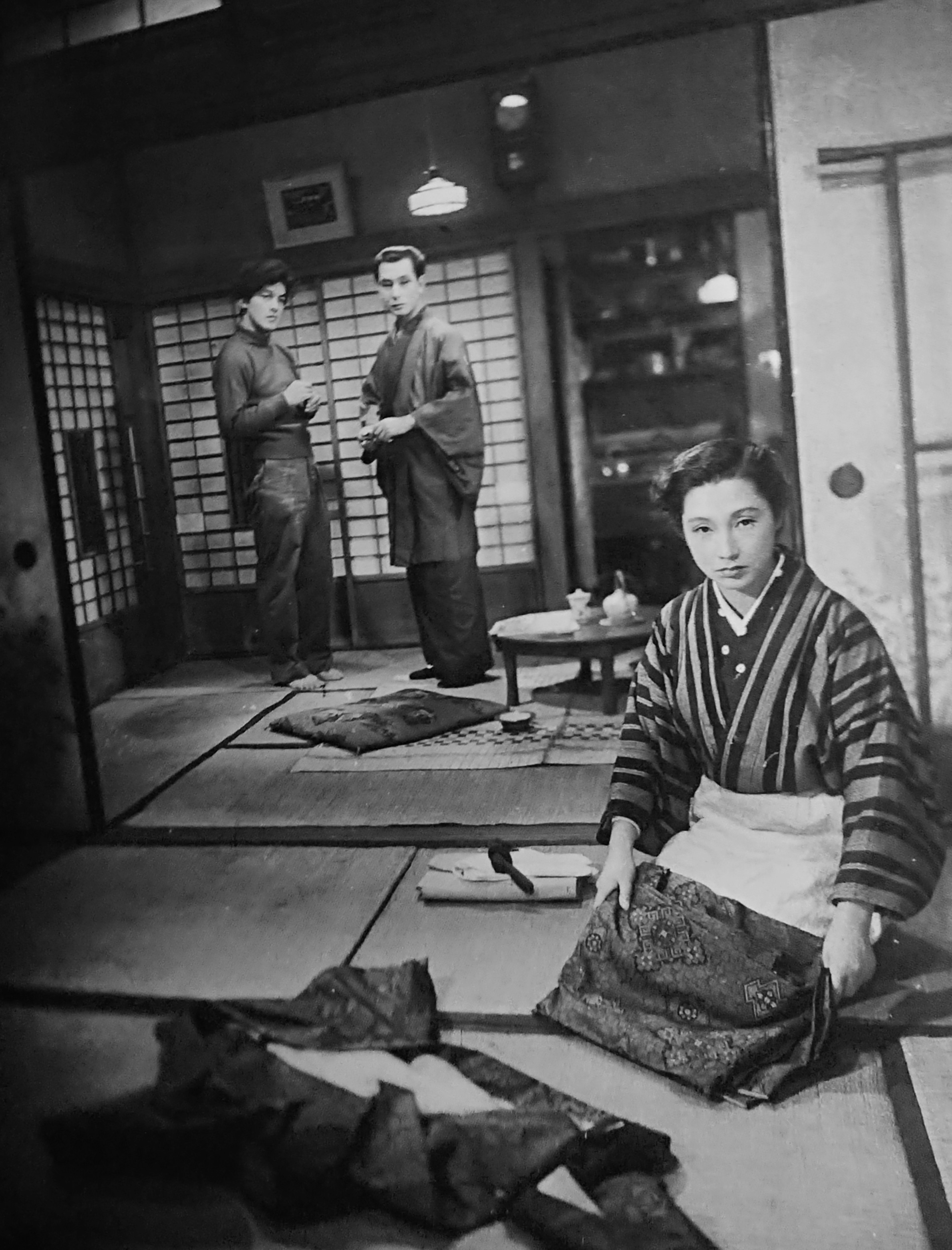
- Rentarō Mikuni, Ken Uehara and Mieko Takamine

Japanese name
- Kanji: 妻
- Directed by: Mikio Naruse
- Written by: Toshirō Ide; Fumiko Hayashi (novel)
- Produced by: Sanezumi Fujimoto
- Starring: Ken Uehara; Mieko Takamine
- Cinematography: Masao Tamai
- Edited by: Eiji Ooi
- Music by: Ichirō Saitō
- Production company: Toho
- Distributed by: Toho
- Release date: 29 April 1953 (Japan)
- Running time: 96 minutes
- Country: Japan
- Language: Japanese

Wife (Japanese: 妻, romanized: Tsuma) is a 1953 Japanese drama film directed by Mikio Naruse. It is based on Fumiko Hayashi's novel Chairo no me (1950).

== Plot ==
Toichi and Mineko have been married for ten years and are both unhappy in their relationship. Mineko laments Toichi's low income and indifference towards her, at the same time defending her refusal to have a family. To make up for Toichi's low salary, Mineko sells knitting works and has rented parts of their house to other tenants, the Matsuyamas and single artist Tadashi. One day, Mrs. Matsuyama, weary of her unemployed husband, moves out, leaving him on his own.

Toichi and his office colleague Fusako, a widow and single mother, have developed unspoken feelings for each other. When Fusako quits her job and moves back to her family in Osaka, Toichi meets her during a business trip and spends the night with her in a ryokan. Back in Tokyo, Toichi confesses his unfaithfulness to Mineko, to which she replies that she will not agree to a divorce. While Mineko's friend Setsuko blames her for her detachedness and egotism, her younger sister Yoshimi, who rejects the institution of marriage, calls her old-fashioned.

Fusako, intent on opening a fashion store with a friend, returns to Tokyo and meets with Toichi, telling him that she loves him. Mineko visits Fusako after she has found her address in Toichi's jacket and scolds her for her behaviour. The dismayed Fusako writes Toichi a letter in which she declares that she will not see him again. In the last scene, Toichi and Mineko again contemplate on their unhappy marriage in inner monologues, as they had done in the opening scene.

== Cast ==
- Ken Uehara as Toichi
- Mieko Takamine as Mihoko
- Yatsuko Tan'ami as Fusako
- Sanae Takasugi as Setsuko
- Rentarō Mikuni as Tadashi
- Michiyo Aratama as Yoshimi
- Tatsuya Ishiguro as Mihoko's uncle
- Chieko Nakakita as Eiko Matsuyama
- Hajime Izu as Mr. Matsuyama
- Yoshiko Tsubouchi as Taeko

== Background ==
Wife was the third in a series of six films by Naruse based on works by writer Hayashi, made between 1951 and 1962. Like Repast, the theme of Wife involved a couple trapped with each other. Because Naruse's regular star Hideko Takamine had turned down the role of Mineko, Mieko Takamine took over the part.

== Reception ==
Naruse biographer Catherine Russell called Wife a "strong melodrama" with a "bleak view of married life", which shows sympathy for both parties, Toichi and Mineko. For Russell, the film "touched a nerve in contemporary society", citing opposing view of critics who saw the fault for the failing marriage either with the wife or the husband.

In an essay for the British Film Institute, reviewer Brad Stevens titled Wife "a work which implies that individuals living in the margins of society may be happier than those afraid to venture beyond the mainstream", and an "inexhaustible masterpiece" which "deserves to be better known".
