= A Wanderer's Notebook =

1962 Japanese film

- Theatrical release poster
- Directed by: Mikio Naruse
- Screenplay by: Toshirō Ide; Sumie Tanaka
- Based on: Diary of a Vagabond; by Fumiko Hayashi; Hōrōki (play); by Kazuo Kikuta
- Produced by: Sanezumi Fujimoto; Mikio Naruse; Tadahiro Teramoto
- Starring: Hideko Takamine; Akira Takarada; Daisuke Katō; Kinuyo Tanaka
- Cinematography: Jun Yasumoto
- Edited by: Hideshi Ohi
- Music by: Yūji Koseki
- Production company: Toho
- Distributed by: Toho
- Release date: 29 September 1962 (Japan)
- Running time: 123 minutes
- Country: Japan
- Language: Japanese

A Wanderer's Notebook (Japanese: 放浪記, Hepburn: Hōrōki), also titled Her Lonely Lane, is a 1962 Japanese drama film directed by Mikio Naruse starring Hideko Takamine. It was written by Toshirō Ide and Sumie Tanaka based on the autobiographical book Diary of a Vagabond by Fumiko Hayashi and its stage adaptation by Kazuo Kikuta.

== Plot ==
Fumiko Hayashi is a young woman who cannot find a decent job and has been dumped by her boyfriend; she writes on the side. Fumiko's friends tell her that her writing about her life in poverty is excellent and impressive, but no publishing company will buy her autobiographic novel. She continues working as a bar girl and a factory worker and gets together with another aspiring writer, Fukuchi, who has also been struggling to sell his work. Despite the fact that she does all she can for him and cares for him while he suffers from tuberculosis, he abuses her verbally and eventually physically. She walks out on him, returns, and then walks out again. Yasuoka, a warm-hearted and hard-working man, helps Fumiko in every way possible and asks for her hand, but she rejects his proposal – to Fumiko, Yasuoka is more of a friend than a lover. After these struggles, the film ends with her literary success.

== Cast ==
- Hideko Takamine as Fumiko Hayashi
- Akira Takarada as Fukuchi
- Daisuke Katō as Yasuoka
- Tatsuo Endō as Chief editor
- Kinuyo Tanaka as Kishi, Fumiko's mother
- Noboru Nakaya

== Legacy ==
A Wanderer's Notebook was screened at the Museum of Modern Art in 1985 and at the Harvard Film Archive in 2005 as part of their retrospectives on Mikio Naruse.
