= Toshirō Ide =

Japanese screenwriter (1910–1988)

- 井手俊郎
- Born: 11 April 1910; Kitahata, Saga
- Died: 3 July 1988 (aged 78)
- Occupation: Screenwriter

Toshirō Ide (井手 俊郎, Ide Toshirō; 11 April 1910 – 3 July 1988) was a Japanese screenwriter for both film and television.

== Career ==
Born in the village of Kitahata in Saga Prefecture, Ide graduated from the Tokyo Higher School of Arts (now the Faculty of Engineering of Chiba University). He initially worked as a magazine illustrator and advertising designer, but through an introduction from the producer Sanezumi Fujimoto, he joined the Toho Studios, first working as a theater manager. After serving during World War II, he rejoined Toho and debuted as a screenwriter in 1949 with Aoi sanmyaku, which was a major hit. He turned freelance in 1951, and penned scripts for directors such as Mikio Naruse, Yuzo Kawashima, and Kihachi Okamoto. He was known for his adaptations of literary works. He also wrote scripts for television.

== Selected filmography ==
- Aoi sanmyaku (1949)
- Repast (1951)
- Mōjū Tsukai no Shōjo (1952)
- Adolescence Part II (1953)
- An Inlet of Muddy Water (1953)
- Wife (1953)
- Husband and Wife (1953)
- Onna no Koyomi (1954)
- A Wife's Heart (1956)
- Romantic Daughters (1956)
- Nagareru (1956)
- Suzaki Paradise: Red Light (1956)
- On Wings of Love (1957)
- Daughters, Wives and a Mother (1960)
- A Wanderer's Notebook (1962)
- The Elegant Life of Mr. Everyman (1963)
- The Stranger Within a Woman (1966)
