= Ken Uehara =

Japanese actor

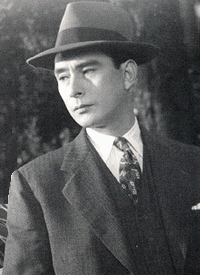
- Born: 7 November 1909; Tokyo, Japan
- Died: 23 November 1991 (aged 82); Tokyo, Japan
- Occupation: Actor
- Years active: 1935-1990

Ken Uehara (上原謙, Uehara Ken; 7 November 1909 – 23 November 1991) was a Japanese actor who appeared in approximately 200 films between 1935 and 1990.

A graduate of Rikkyo University, Uehara joined the Shochiku film studio in 1935. After World War II, he became a freelance actor, before signing with the Toho film studio. Directors Uehara worked with include Mikio Naruse, Yasujirō Shimazu, Hiroshi Shimizu, Keisuke Kinoshita, Yasujirō Ozu, and Kenji Mizoguchi. In 1953, he received the Mainichi Film Award for his performances in Wife and Husband and Wife. He is the father of singer and actor Yūzō Kayama, and the grandfather of actress Emi Ikehata.

== Selected filmography ==
- Mr. Thank You (1936)
- What Did the Lady Forget? (1937)
- A Brother and His Younger Sister (1939)
- The Story of Tank Commander Nishizumi (1940)
- The Munekata Sisters (1950)
- Repast (1951)
- Where Chimneys Are Seen (1953)
- Husband and Wife (1953)
- Sound of the Mountain (1954)
- Late Chrysanthemums (1954)
- Untamed (1957)
- A Rainbow Plays in My Heart (1957)
- A Holiday in Tokyo (1958)
- Daughters, Wives and a Mother (1960)
- Mothra (1961)
- Chūshingura: Hana no Maki, Yuki no Maki (1962)
- Gorath (1962)
- Atragon (1963)
- Shin Hissatsu Shiokinin (1977, TV)
- Edo no Kaze (1980, TV)
- The Girl Who Leapt Through Time (1983)
- Film Actress (1987), as himself
- Choujinki Metalder (1987, TV)
