= Ichirō Saitō =

Japanese composer (1909–1979)

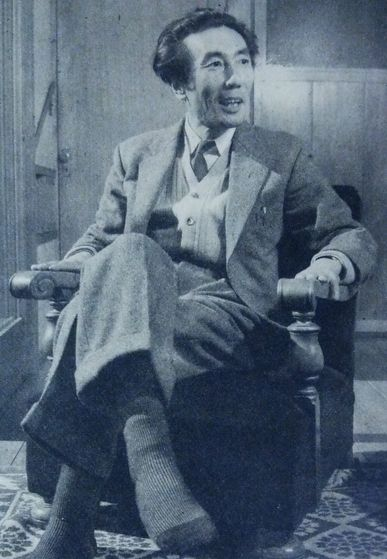
Saitō Ichirō.

Ichirō Saitō (斎藤一郎, Saitō Ichirō) (August 23, 1909 – November 16, 1979) was a Japanese film composer.

== Film score ==
He made film music for 334 films including:

- Record of a Tenement Gentleman (長屋紳士録, Nagaya shinshiroku) (1947)
- Mother (おかあさん, Okaasan) (1952)
- Lightning (稲妻, Inazuma) (1952)
- The Flavor of Green Tea over Rice (お茶漬けの味, Ochazuke no aji) (1952)
- The Life of Oharu (西鶴一代女, Saikaku Ichidai Onna) (1952)
- Foghorn (霧笛, Muteki) (1952)
- Wife (妻, Tsuma) (1953)
- A Geisha (祇園囃子, Gion Bayashi) (1953)
- Older Brother, Younger Sister (あにいもうと, Ani Imōto) (1953)
- Sound of the Mountain (山の音, Yama no Oto) (1954)
- Onna no Koyomi (1954)
- Late Chrysanthemums (晩菊, Bangiku) (1954)
- Floating Clouds (浮雲, Ukigumo) (1955)
- The Romance of Yushima (婦系図 湯島の白梅, Onna Keizu Yushima no Shiraume) (1955)
- Sudden Rain (驟雨, Shūu) (1956)
- A Wife's Heart (妻の心, Tsuma no kokoro) (1956)
- Flowing (流れる, Nagareru) (1956)
- Suzakumon (朱雀門) (1957)
- Untamed or Untamed Woman (あらくれ, Arakure) (1957)
- Yatarō gasa (弥太郎笠) (1957)
- The Loyal 47 Ronin (忠臣蔵, Chūshingura) (1958)
- The Approach of Autumn (Aki tachinu) (1960)
- As a Wife, As a Woman (1961)
- Destiny's Son (斬る, Kiru) (1962)
- Yearning (乱れる, Midareru) (1964)
- Execution in Autumn (秋決, Qiu Jue) (1972)
