= Zenzo Matsuyama =

Japanese screenwriter and film director (1925–2016)

Zenzō Matsuyama
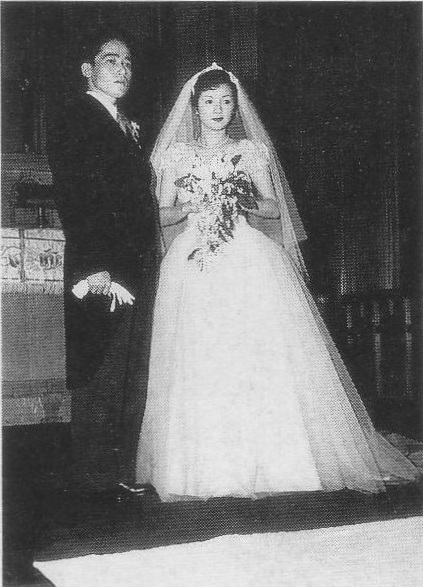
- The wedding of Matsuyama and Takamine
- Born: 3 April 1925; Kobe, Japan
- Died: 27 August 2016 (aged 91)
- Occupations: Screenwriter; director
- Spouse: Hideko Takamine (m. 1955; died 2010)

Zenzō Matsuyama (松山 善三, Matsuyama Zenzō; 3 April 1925 – 27 August 2016) was a Japanese screenwriter and film director. He was born in Kobe and grew up in Yokohama. After leaving school, he began training to become a doctor but dropped out of medical school to take up a career in films. In 1948 he became an assistant director at Shochiku studios. With the support of Keisuke Kinoshita, he also began writing film scripts. His first filmed script was Kojo no tsuki, based on the song "Kōjō no Tsuki", filmed in 1954. In 1955 he married actress Hideko Takamine. He made his debut as a director with a film called Na mo naku mazushiku utsukushiku in 1961. He continued to work as a scriptwriter for films like Proof of the Man as well as a director. He also wrote the lyrics for a song "Ippon no enpitsu" for Hibari Misora.

== Selected filmography ==
Title (English)	Release date	Title (Japanese)	Job
The Human Condition	1959-1961	人間の條件	Scriptwriter
Na mo Naku Mazushiku Utsukushiku	1961	名もなく貧しく美しく	Scriptwriter, director
Sanga Ari	1962	山河あり	Scriptwriter, director
Burari Bura-bura Monogatari	1962	ぶらりぶらぶら物語	Scriptwriter, director
Yearning	1964	乱れる	Scriptwriter
Could I But Live	1964	われ一粒の麦なれど	Scriptwriter, director
Long Journey into Love	1973	—N/a	Scriptwriter
The Twilight Years	1973	恍惚の人	Scriptwriter
Proof of the Man	1978	人間の証明	Scriptwriter
