= Setsuko Hara =

Japanese actress (1920–2015)

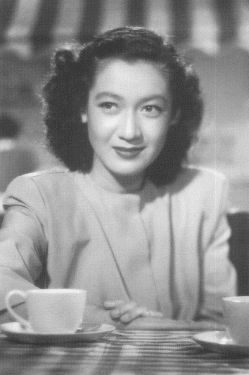
- Setsuko Hara in Late Spring in 1949
- Born: Masae Aida; 17 June 1920; Yokohama, Kanagawa, Japan
- Died: 5 September 2015 (aged 95); Kanagawa, Japan
- Occupation: Actress
- Years active: 1935–1963
- Notable work: No Regrets for Our Youth; Late Spring; Early Summer; Tokyo Story

Japanese name
- Kanji: 原 節子
- Hiragana: はら せつこ
Transcriptions
- Romanization: Hara Setsuko

Alternative Japanese name
- Kanji: 会田 昌江
- Hiragana: あいだ まさえ
Transcriptions
- Romanization: Aida Masae

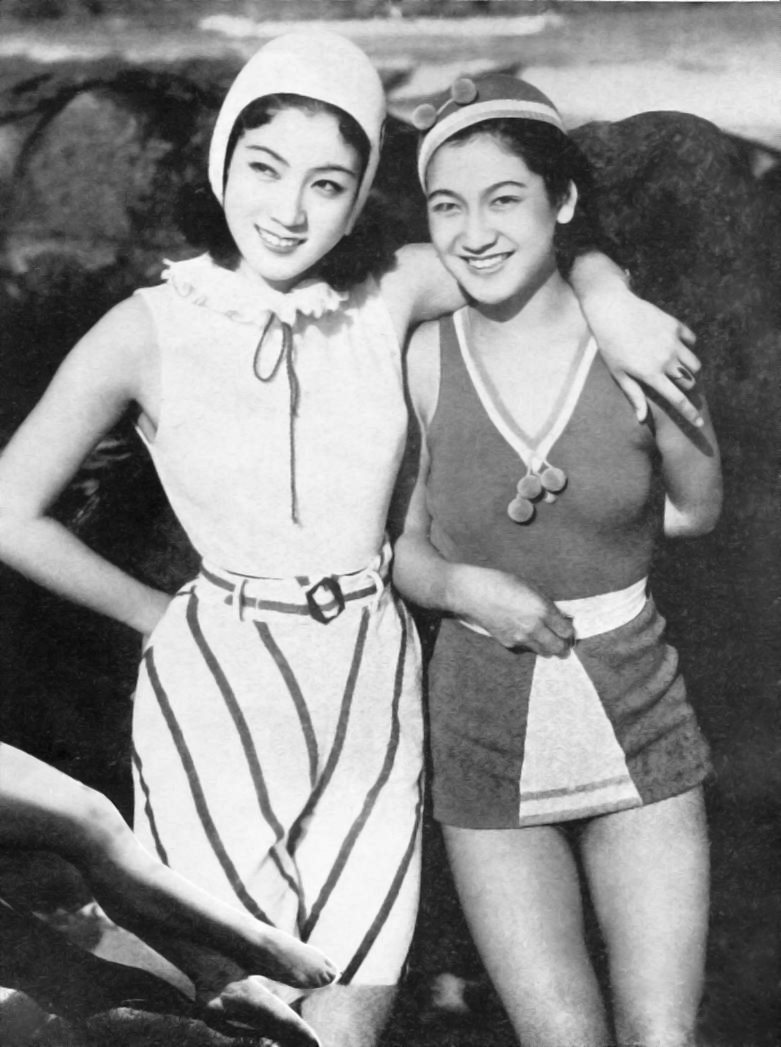
Kiyo Kuroda (left) and Setsuko Hara (right) in Atami, Shizuoka (photo from the July 1936 issue of the film magazine Nikkatsu Gahō)

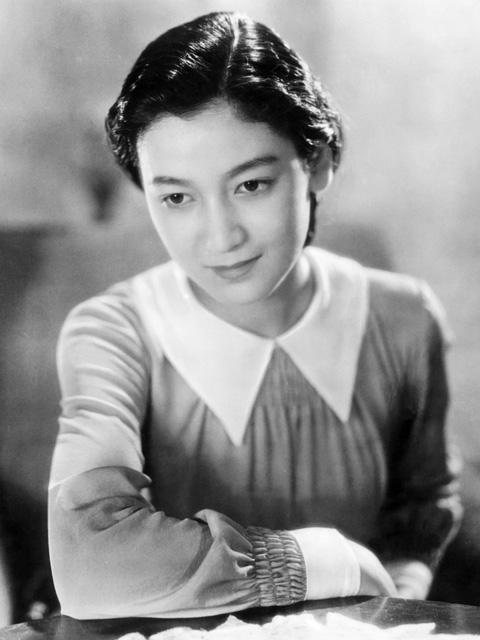
Hara in Atarashiki Tsuchi (1937)

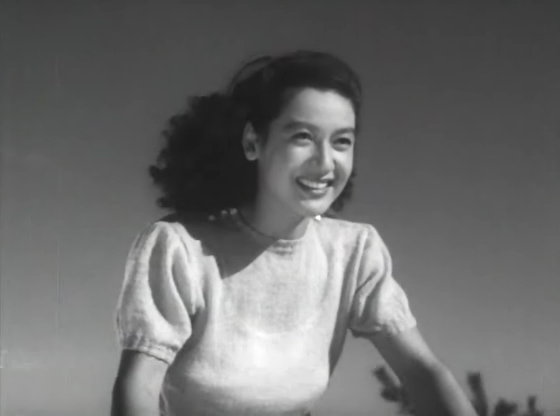
In Late Spring (1949)

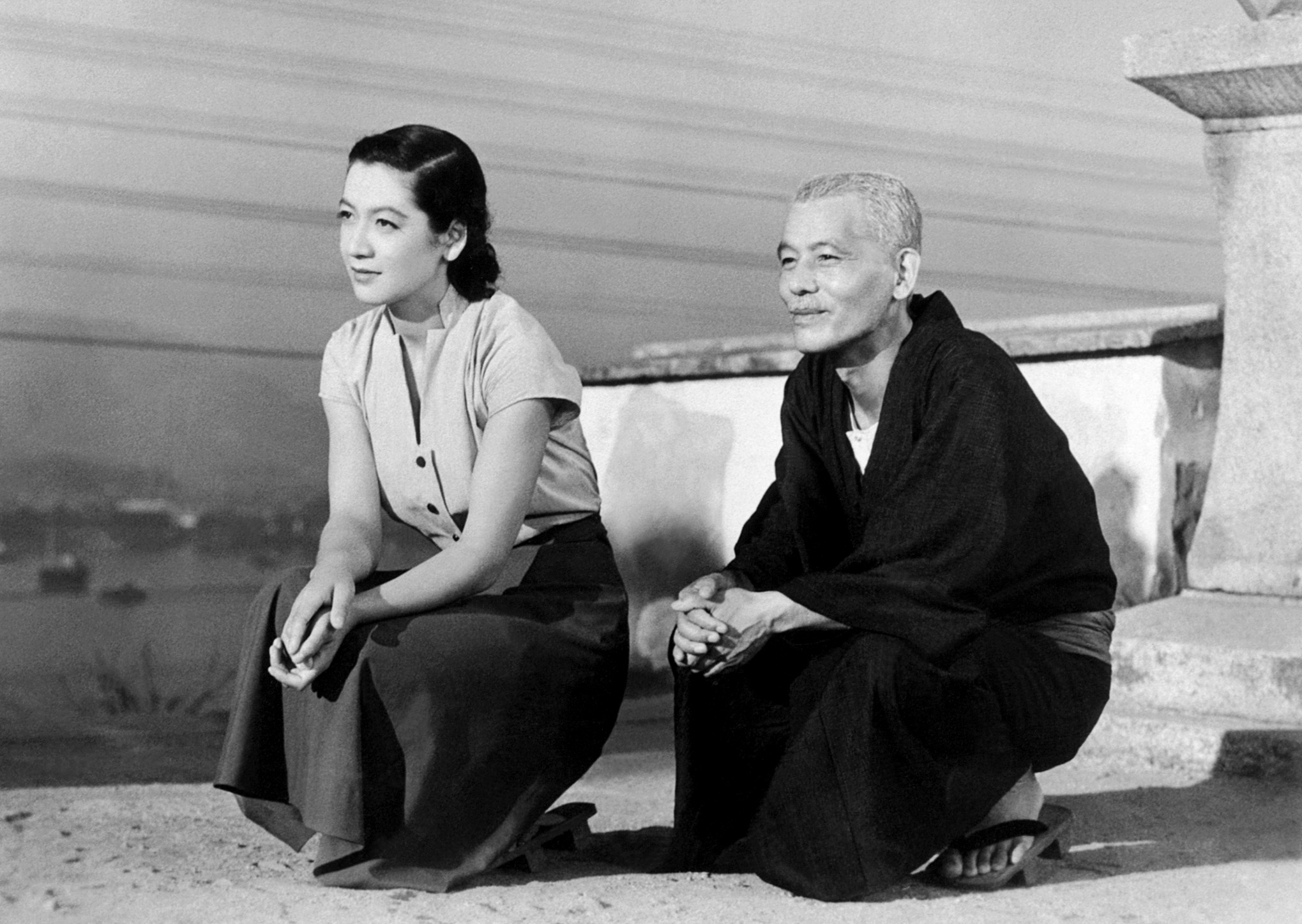
In Tokyo Story (1953)

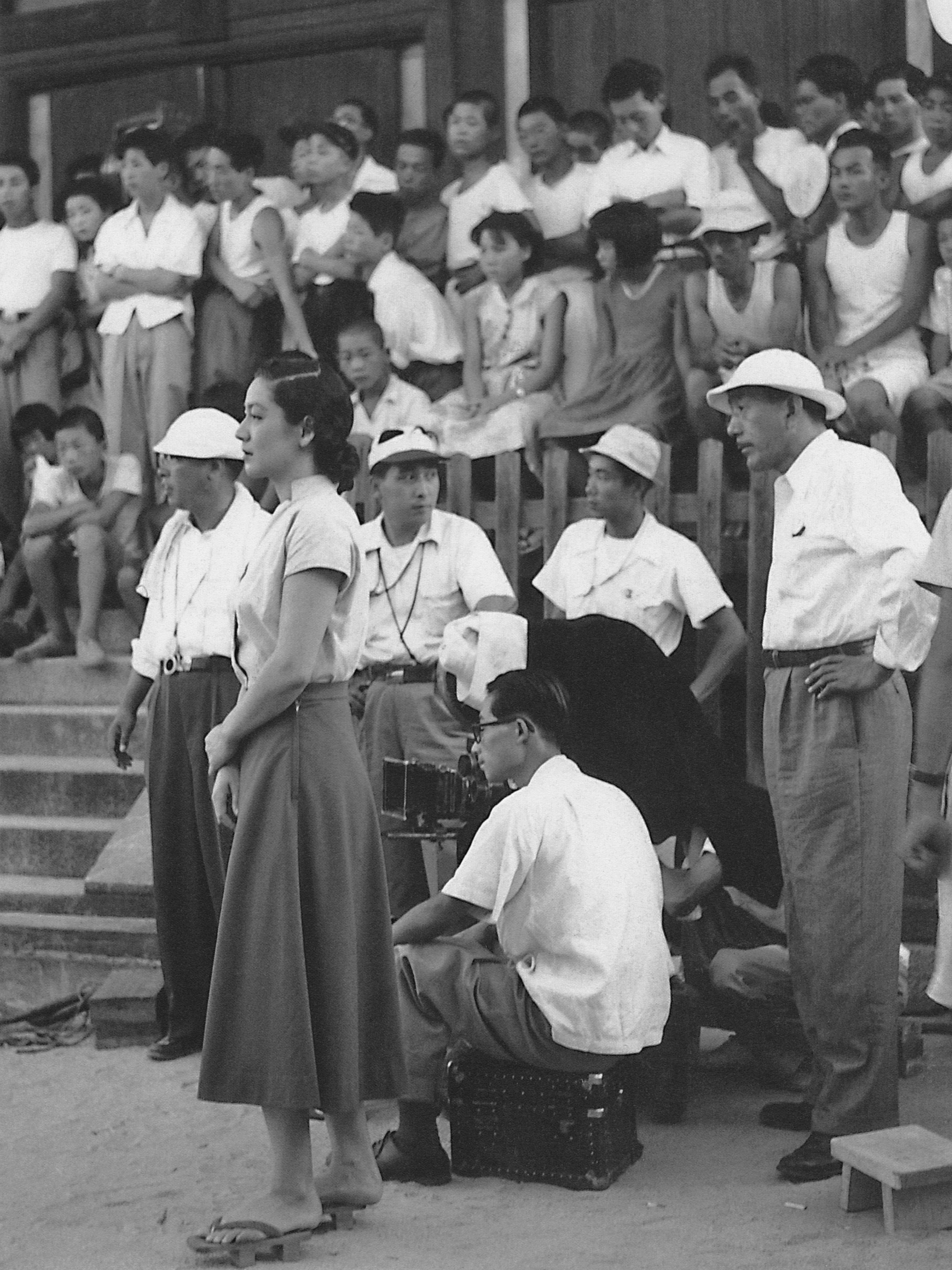
Hara on location of Tokyo Story (1953), director Yasujirō Ozu (far right), on the grounds of Jōdo-ji in Onomichi, Hiroshima, in August 1953

Setsuko Hara (原 節子, Hara Setsuko; born Masae Aida (会田 昌江); 17 June 1920 – 5 September 2015) was a Japanese actress. She is best known for her performances in Yasujirō Ozu's films Late Spring (1949), Tokyo Story (1953) and Tokyo Twilight (1957), amongst many others, and for working extensively with director Mikio Naruse. She is widely considered to be one of the greatest Japanese film actresses of all time.

== Early life and work ==
Setsuko Hara was born Masae Aida (会田 昌江, Aida Masae) in what is now Hodogaya-ku, Yokohama in a family with three sons and five daughters. Her elder sister was married to film director Hisatora Kumagai, which gave her an entry into the world of the cinema: he encouraged her to drop out of school, which she did, and then she worked for Nikkatsu Studios in Tamagawa, outside Tokyo, in 1935. She debuted at the age of 15 with a stage name that the studio gave her in Do Not Hesitate Young Folks! (ためらふ勿れ若人よ, tamerafu nakare wakōdo yo).

She came to prominence as an actress in the 1937 German-Japanese co-production Die Tochter des Samurai (The Daughter of the Samurai), known in Japan as Atarashiki Tsuchi (The New Earth), directed by Arnold Fanck and Mansaku Itami. In the film, Hara plays a woman who unsuccessfully attempts to immolate herself in a volcano. She continued to portray tragic heroines in many of her films until the end of World War II, like The Suicide Troops of the Watchtower (1942) and The Green Mountains (1949), directed by Tadashi Imai, and Toward the Decisive Battle in the Sky, directed by Kunio Watanabe.

== Postwar career ==
Hara remained in Japan after 1945 and continued making films. She starred in Akira Kurosawa’s first postwar film No Regrets for Our Youth (1946). She also worked with director Kimisaburo Yoshimura in The Ball at the Anjo House (1947) and Keisuke Kinoshita in Here’s to the Girls (1949). In all of these films, she was portrayed as the “new” Japanese woman, looking forward to a bright future. However, in most of her movies, especially those directed by Yasujirō Ozu and Mikio Naruse she plays the typical Japanese woman, as either daughter, wife, or mother.

Hara’s first film of six with Yasujirō Ozu was Late Spring (1949), and their collaboration lasted for twelve years. In Late Spring, she plays Noriko, a devoted daughter who prefers to stay at home and take care of her father than to marry, despite the urgings of her family members. In Early Summer (1951), she played an unrelated character also called Noriko, who wanted to get married, and finds the courage to do so without her family’s approval. This film was followed by Tokyo Story (1953), perhaps her and Ozu's best-known film, in which she played a widow, also called Noriko whose husband was killed in the war. Her devotion to her deceased husband worries her in-laws, who insist that she should move on and remarry.

Hara's last major role was Riku, the wife of Ōishi Yoshio, in the film Chushingura (1962).

== Later years ==
Hara, who never married, is nicknamed "the Eternal Virgin" in Japan and is a symbol of the golden era of Japanese cinema of the 1950s. She quit acting in 1963 (the year Ozu died), and subsequently led a secluded life in Kamakura, where many of her films with Ozu were made, refusing to be interviewed or photographed. For years, people speculated about her reasons for leaving the public eye. Hara herself confessed during her final press conference that she never really enjoyed acting and was only using it as a means to support her family; however, many people continued to speculate over her possible romantic involvement with Ozu, or the possibility of failing eyesight. Hara was an avid smoker and drinker.

After seeing a Setsuko Hara film, the novelist Shūsaku Endō wrote: "We would sigh or let out a great breath from the depths of our hearts, for what we felt was precisely this: Can it be possible that there is such a woman in this world?"

=== Death ===
After half a century of seclusion, Hara died of pneumonia at a hospital in Kanagawa Prefecture on 5 September 2015, at the age of 95. Her death was not reported by the media until 25 November of that year due to her family only approaching them later, presumably for privacy. The anime film Millennium Actress (2001), directed by Satoshi Kon, is partly based on her life.

== Legacy ==
Hara is considered by many critics and filmmakers to be one of the greatest Japanese film actresses of all time. Yasujirō Ozu, with whom she worked six times, said of her in 1951: "It is rare for an actress to perform as well as Setsuko Hara. She's a radish, without rather than revealing his own ignorance of the director not noticing the radish. In fact, without flattery, I think she's the best Japanese film actress." In his 1991 autobiography, Chishu Ryu described Hara as "not just beautiful, but also a skilled actress. She didn't make mistakes. Ozu rarely praised actors, ever. But he did say, 'She's good', which meant she was truly something." Actors and crew members who worked with Hara described her as shy but also friendly to work with.

In 2000, Hara was selected by celebrities as the greatest Japanese actress in Kinema Junpo's list of the great 20th-century movie actors and actresses.

== Selected filmography ==
- Tamerau nakare wakodo yo (1935) – Osetsu
- Shīnya no taiyō (1935) – Kimie Oda
- Midori no chiheisen zenpen (1935)
- Midori no chiheisen kohen (1935)
- Hakui no kajin (1936) – Yukiko
- Kōchiyama Sōshun (1936) – Onami
- Yomeiri mae no musume tachi (1936)
- Seimei no kanmuri (1936) – Ayako Arimura
- Tange sazen: Nikko no maki (1936)
- Kenji to sono imōto (1937)
- The Daughter of the Samurai (1937) – Misuko Yamato
- Tōkai Bijoden (1937)
- Haha no kyoku I (1937) – Keiko
- Haha no kyoku II (1937) – Keiko
- The Giant (1938) – Chiyo
- Den'en kōkyōgaku (1938) – Yukiko
- Shogun no magō (1938) – Kireii Nae Sasano
- Fuyu no yado (1938)
- Uruwashiki shuppatsu (1939) – Tomiko Hōjō
- Chūshingura (1939, part 1, 2) – Oteru
- The Naval Brigade at Shanghai (1939) – young Chinese woman
- Machi (1939) – Sonomi Kihara
- Onna no kyōshitsu (1939, part 1, 2) – Chen Feng-ying
- Tokyo no josei (1939) – Setsuko Kimizuka
- Hikari to kage (1940, part 1, 2) – Sahoko Katsura
- Toyuki (1940) – Showa Kinema actress
- Totsugu hi made (1940) – Yoshiko
- Hebihimesama (1940) – Koto Hime
- Onna no machi (1940) – Ine
- Futari no sekai (1940)
- Shimai no Yakusoku (1940) – Sachiko
- Anî no hânayomê (1941) – Akiko
- Ôinaru kanō (1941)
- Kēkkon no seitaî (1941) – Haruko Sanno
- A Story of Leadership (1941) – eldest daughter
- Kibō no aozora (1942) – Chizuko
- Seishun no kiryū (1942) – Makiko, his sister
- Wakai sensei (1942) – Tomiko Hirayama
- Midori no daichi (1942) – Wife Hatsue
- Haha no chizu (1942) – Kirie
- Hawai Mare Oki Kaisen (The War at Sea from Hawaii to Malay) (1942) – Kikuko
- Hawai • Maree oki kaisen (1942) – Kikuko
- Ahen senso (a.k.a. The Opium War) (1943) – Airan [Ai Lan]
- Bōrō no kesshitai (1943) – Yoshiko
- Toward the Decisive Battle in the Sky (1943) – older sister
- Searing Wind (1943) – Kumiko
- Suicide Troops of the Watchtower (1943) – Commander Takazu's wife
- Ikari no umi (1944) – Mitsuko Hiraga
- Young Eagles (1944)
- Shōri no hi made (1945)
- Kita no san-nin (1945) – Sumiko Ueno
- Koi no fūunjī (1945) – Yukiko Hasebe
- Midori no kokkyō (1946) – Maki Kuriyama
- Reijin (1946) – Keiko
- No Regrets for Our Youth (1946) – Yukie Yagihara
- Kakedashi jidai (1947) – Miyako Tomoda
- The Ball at the Anjo House (1947) – Atsuko Anjō
- Onnadake no yoru (1947)
- Sanbon yubi no otoko (1947) – Shizuko
- Yuwaku (1948) – Takako
- Toki no teizo: zengohen (1948)
- Fujisancho (1948)
- Taifuken no onna (1948) – Kuriko Sato
- Kofuku no genkai (1948)
- President and a female clerk (1948) – Shop girl
- Tonosama Hotel (1949) – Aki Nagaoka
- Ojōsan kanpai (Here's to the Young Lady) (1949) – Yasuko Ikeda
- Aoi sanmyaku (1949) – Yukiko Shimazaki
- Zoku aoi sanmyaku (1949) – Yukiko Shimazaki
- Late Spring (1949, directed by Ozu) – Noriko Somiya
- Shirayuki-sensei to kodomo-tachi (1950) – Kayoko Amamiya
- Arupisu monogatari: Yasei (1950)
- Nanairo no hana (1950) – Teruko Kashiwagi
- Joi no Shinsatsushitsu (1950) – Dr. Tajima
- The Idiot (1951) – Taeko Nasu
- Early Summer (1951, directed by Ozu) – Noriko Mamiya
- Repast (1951) – Michiyo Okamoto
- Kaze futatabi (1952)
- Kin no tamago: Golden girl (1952)
- Tōkyō no koibito (1952) – Yuki
- Shirauo (1953) – Sachiko
- Tokyo Story (1953, directed by Ozu) – Noriko Hirayama
- Sound of the Mountain (1954) – Ogata Kikuko
- Non-chan Kumo ni Noru (1955) – Nobuko's mother
- Uruwashiki haha (1955) – Mitsuyo Ōta
- Shūu (1956) – Fumiko
- Aijō no kessan (1956) – Katsuko
- Kon'yaku sanbagarasu (1956)
- Jōshū to tomo ni (1956) – Sugiyama, manager
- Ani to sono musume (1956) – Akiko Mamiya
- Ōban (1957) – Kanako Mori
- Tokyo Twilight (1957, directed by Ozu) – Takako Numata
- Chieko-sho (1957) – Chieko Takamura
- Zoku Ōban: Fūun hen (1957) – Kanako Arishima
- Saigo no dasso (1957) – Tomiko
- Zokuzoku Ōban: Dotō hen (1957) – Kanako Arishima
- Onna de aru koto (1958) – Ichiko
- A Holiday in Tokyo (1958) – Chairman
- Ōban kanketsu hen (1958)
- Onna gokoro (1959) – Isoko
- The Three Treasures (1959) – Amaterasu, the Sun Goddess
- Robo no ishi (1960) – Oren Aikawa
- Daughters, Wives and a Mother (1960) – Sanae Sakanoshi, the eldest daughter
- Fundoshi isha (1960) – Iku, Wife of Keisai
- Late Autumn (1960, directed by Ozu) – Akiko Miwa
- The End of Summer (1961, directed by Ozu) – Akiko
- Musume to watashi (1962) – Chizuko Iwatani
- Chushingura (1962) – Riku (final film role)
