= Sanezumi Fujimoto =

Japanese film producer (1910–1979)

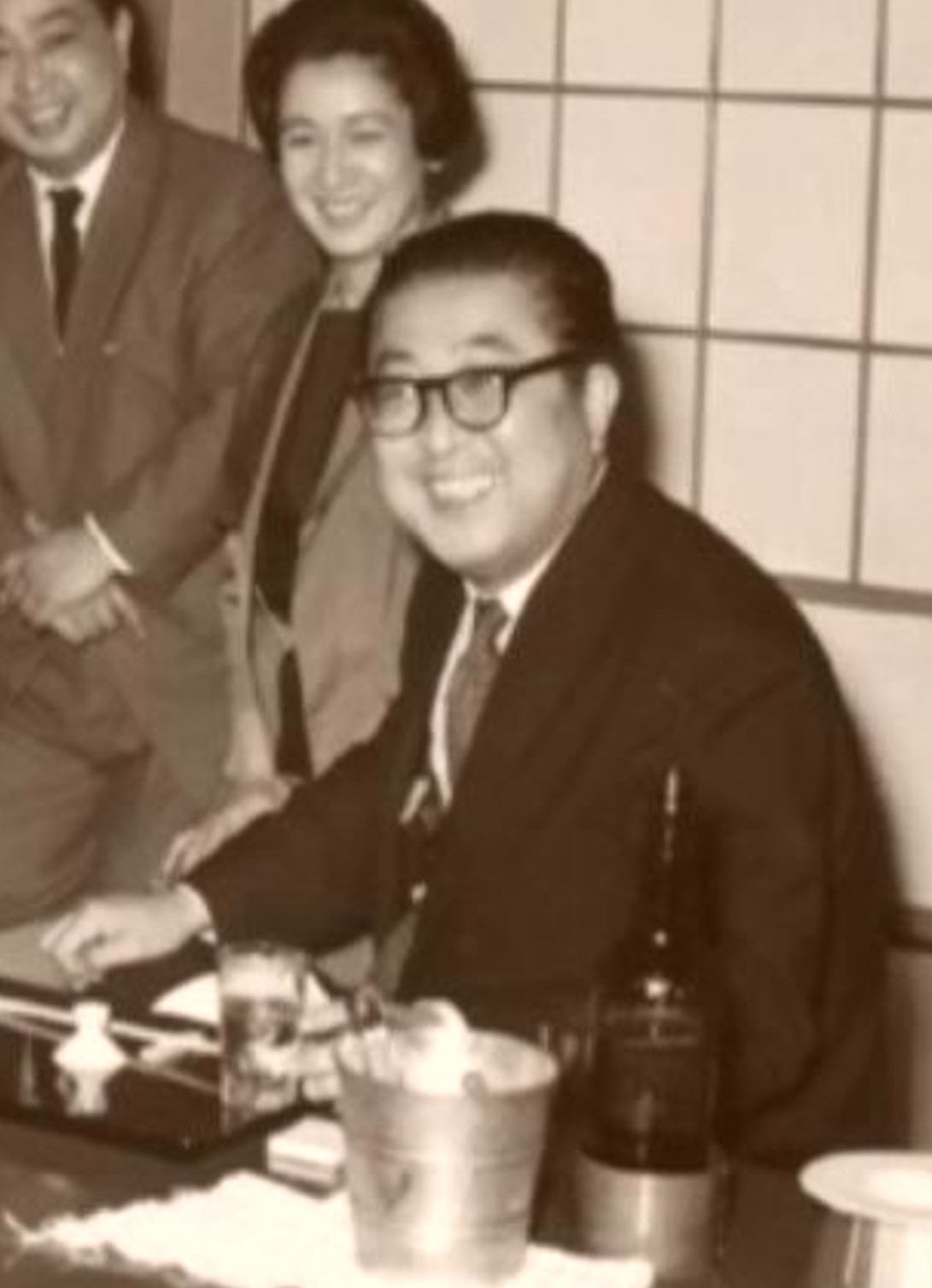
- Fujimoto in 1961
- Born: July 15, 1910; Yamaguchi, Japan
- Died: May 2, 1979 (aged 68); Tokyo, Japan
- Occupation: Film producer
- Years active: 1942–1979

Sanezumi Fujimoto (藤本 真澄, Fujimoto Sanezumi; July 15, 1910 – May 2, 1979) was a Japanese film producer. He served as the head of production for Toho Studios. He was co-producer of Akira Kurosawa's The Hidden Fortress. He also produced many other films, including Yasujirō Ozu's The End of Summer, Kihachi Okamoto's The Sword of Doom and Japan's Longest Day and several films directed by Mikio Naruse.

After co-producing The Hidden Fortress, Fujimoto had the task as Toho's head of production of convincing Kurosawa to form his own production company. He had to convince Kurosawa that his own production company would be to his advantage, even though the main reason Toho wanted Kurosawa to form his own production company was to avoid the risk of cost overruns as had happened on The Hidden Fortress. Fujimoto then became a board member of Kurosawa Productions.

== Selected filmography ==
- Repast (めし Meshi), Mikio Naruse, (1951)
- Husband and Wife (夫婦 Fûfu), Mikio Naruse, (1953)
- Mr. Pu (Pu-san), Kon Ichikawa, (1953)
- Wife (妻 Tsuma), Mikio Naruse, (1953)
- Sound of the Mountain (山の音 Yama no Oto), Mikio Naruse, (1954)
- Late Chrysanthemums (晩菊 Bangiku), Mikio Naruse, (1954)
- Floating Clouds (浮雲 Ukigumo), Mikio Naruse, (1955)
- Sudden Rain (驟雨 Shūu), Mikio Naruse, (1956)
- A Wife's Heart (妻の心 Tsuma no kokoro), Mikio Naruse, (1956)
- Flowing (流れる Nagareru), Mikio Naruse, (1956)
- Song for a Bride (花嫁三重奏 Hanayome sanjuso), Ishirō Honda, (1958)
- The Hidden Fortress (隠し砦の三悪人 Kakushi toride no san akunin), Akira Kurosawa, (1958)
- Daughters, Wives and a Mother (娘 妻 母 Musume tsuma haha), Mikio Naruse, (1960)
- Sir Galahad in Campus (大学の若大将 Daigaku no Wakadaishō), Toshio Sugie, (1961)
- The Last War (世界大戦争 Sekai Daisensō), Shūe Matsubayashi, (1961)
- The End of Summer (小早川家の秋 Kohayagawa-ke no aki), Yasujirō Ozu, (1961)
- A Wanderer's Notebook (放浪記 Hourou-ki), Mikio Naruse, (1962)
- Chūshingura (忠臣蔵 花の巻 雪の巻 Hana no Maki, Yuki no Maki), Hiroshi Inagaki, (1962)
- Yearning (乱れる Midareru), Mikio Naruse, (1964)
- Godzilla vs. The Thing (モスラ対ゴジラ Mosura tai Gojira), Ishirō Honda, (1964)
- The Crazy Adventure (大冒険, Kureji no daiboken), Kengo Furusawa, (1965)
- The Stranger Within a Woman (女の中にいる他人 Onna no naka ni iru tanin), Mikio Naruse, (1966)
- The Sword of Doom (大菩薩峠 Dai-bosatsu Tōge), Kihachi Okamoto, (1966)
- Japan's Longest Day (日本のいちばん長い日 Nihon no ichiban nagai hi), Kihachi Okamoto, (1967)
- Goyokin (御用金 Goyōkin), Hideo Gosha, (1969)
- The Scandalous Adventures of Buraikan (無頼漢 Buraikan), Masahiro Shinoda, (1970)
- To Love Again (愛ふたたび Ai futatabi), Kon Ichikawa, (1971)
- Battle of Okinawa (激動の昭和史 沖縄決戦 Gekidō no Shōwashi: Okinawa Kessen), Kihachi Okamoto, (1971)
- The Wolves (Shussho Iwai), Hideo Gosha, (1971)
- The Gate of Youth (青春の門 Seishun no mon), Kirirō Urayama, (1975)
