= Repast (film) =

1951 Japanese film

Meshi
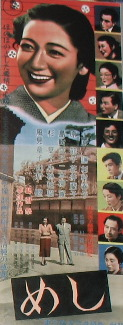
- Japanese theatrical release poster
- Hiragana: めし
- Directed by: Mikio Naruse
- Written by: Toshirō Ide; Sumie Tanaka; Yasunari Kawabata (scenario supervisor); Fumiko Hayashi (novel)
- Produced by: Sanezumi Fujimoto
- Starring: Setsuko Hara; Ken Uehara; Yukiko Shimazaki
- Cinematography: Masao Tamai
- Music by: Fumio Hayasaka
- Production company: Toho
- Distributed by: Toho
- Release date: 23 November 1951 (Japan)
- Running time: 98 minutes
- Country: Japan
- Language: Japanese

Repast (Japanese: めし, Hepburn: Meshi) is a 1951 Japanese drama and shōshimin-eiga film directed by Mikio Naruse and starring Setsuko Hara. It is based on the final and unfinished novel by Fumiko Hayashi, and was the first in a series of adaptations of her work by the director.

== Plot ==
In Tokyo, middle-aged Michiyo marries broker Hatsunonsuke through an arranged marriage. 2 years later, on account of Hatsunosuke’s work transfer, Michiyo sacrifices her employment and the couple relocate to a neighborhood on the south side of Osaka, which resembles suburbia more than urbanity. Their neighbors include an older woman, her young son Yoshitaro, who is trying to break into the workforce, and Ryu Kanazawa, a young woman who is a bar owner and a mistress, which Michiyo disapproves of. 3 years since, Michiyo reflects upon her vanished hopes and dreams as her husband neglects her while she ceaselessly spends her days tending to domestic affairs, with only her cat as companion. The family is in dire financial straits and despite his adjacent line of work, Hatsunosuke does not trade stocks himself.

One day, while Hatsunosuke is at work, his 20-year-old niece Satoko ran away from Tokyo to escape an arranged marriage planned by her parents. Michiyo warmly welcomes her into their family residence. Hatsunosuke is surprised by her arrival but the two quickly bond, with a distinctly flirtatious tone to their conduct. When Hatsunosuke offers to bring Michiyo along with Satoko on a sightseeing tour of Osaka, since she has not seen the sights either, Michiyo declines on account of being too busy with housework. During the tour, Satoko and Hatsunosuke talk about their lives, with the latter suggesting that she marry for love but the former claiming that love gets one nowhere if one cannot even pay the bills. At a restaurant, Hatsunosuke ambiguously tells her that both married life and single life are good.

Some time later, Michiyo is invited to a meal at a restaurant with a group of friends from school, which she reluctantly accepts, on account of having only an old suit to wear for the occasion. As she meets up with her friends, some of whom are unmarried and some with children, she complains about the dreariness of her life but is met with praise for her persistent beauty and envy for her life. After the meal, Michiyo goes with one unmarried friend, Doya, to a teahouse, where she chances upon Kazuo, a male cousin visiting from Tokyo, and calls to arrange for Satoko to prepare dinner that night, since she will be out late. However, Satoko accepts Kanazawa’s offer to spend time at her house. Thus, she returns home tired and falls asleep.

As Hatsunosuke returns to find Satoko asleep, he wakes her up and prepares tea. Asking him to pull her off of the futon, she falls into his embrace just as she has a nosebleed, so he treats it. When Michiyo returns, she finds that, in her absence, the front door was left unlocked, allowing naughty neighborhood kids to steal Hatsunosuke’s new and expensive work shoes. Seeing evidence of their tea drinking and Satoko’s smoking and realizing that the task of making dinner again falls on her shoulders, Michiyo becomes visibly frustrated and openly expresses her dissatisfaction with her life. Hatsunosuke and Satoko both hear her but neither say nor do anything in response.

At work, one of Hatsunosuke’s coworkers arranges a meeting that night with Hatsunosuke and Marugaki, whose son happens to be the Kanazawa’s patron, to convince Hatsunosuke to join them in a business scheme. Afterwards, Kanazawa escorts a drunk Hatsunosuke home. Later, Satoko spends the day with Yoshitaro, who openly pursues her, and Kanazawa before returning late at night. As she is dropped off by a taxi, Hatsunosuke meets her and they link arms as they walk to the house. At the sight of this, Michiyo sinks into quiet despair.

Michiyo visits Kazuo’s mother and gives her an excuse for wanting to return to Tokyo; Kazuo joins her. Returning home to Yoshitaro wooing Satoko, Michiyo directly suggests that she return to Tokyo, which she refuses. However, when Hatsunosuke returns home, Satoko tells him that though she would like to marry someone like him, such men are too old for her, so she has decided to return to Tokyo the next day to fulfill her marriage, with Michiyo accompanying her. He does not see them off at the train station for he is at work, where he declines the proposed scheme. Bumping into Kazuo on the train, Satoko develops an instant attraction.

In Tokyo, Michiyo visits her mother, who lives with her sister Mitsuko and brother-in-law Shinzo. She asks Doya to help Hatsunosuke around the house, which she obliges. Against her mother’s wishes, Michiyo wishes to remain in Tokyo and Kazuo agrees to help find her a job, for he cannot bear to watch her remain in an unhappy marriage. However, she realizes that her separation from Hatsunosuke has left her lonely, so she writes a letter about it to him but does not mail it because he has not written to her. Meanwhile, Hatsunosuke does not make a decision regarding a job offer because he is waiting to consult Michiyo. One night, a storm hits Tokyo and is reported to affect western Japan, where Osaka is, most severely, but Michiyo seems unconcerned. Meanwhile, Satoko has an argument with her parents and runs to Michiyo’s. They allow her to stay the night but an argument begins about Satoko acting emotionally instead of rationally, culminating in Shinzo curtly telling Satoko and Michiyo that they can get their futons ready by themselves because Mitsuko and the mother have been working all day.

The next morning, Osaka is left unscathed and Satoko tells Michiyo that she has fallen in love with Kazuo and wants to marry him. They go to Satoko’s and while Satoko talks to her father, her mother urges Michiyo to return to Osaka. Solemnly pondering her words on the way home, Michiyo is paid a surprise visit by Hatsunosuke. She runs out but he catches up with her. Revealing that he is in the city for a business trip that ends the following day, Hatsunosuke asks Michiyo if he would like to return with him to Osaka; she agrees. On the train back, Michiyo tears up the letter and throws it out the window. When Hatsunosuke briefly awakes from his slumber, she asks him if he would like to know what she wrote in it, but he merely says that he is too tired and returns to sleep. Seeing him exhausted from a similarly monotonous life of work, Michiyo realizes that perhaps working alongside such a husband is where her true happiness lies as a woman.

== Cast ==
- Ken Uehara as Hatsunosuke Okamoto
- Setsuko Hara as Michiyo Okamoto
- Yukiko Shimazaki as Satoko Okamoto
- Yōko Sugi as Mitsuko Murata, Michiyo's sister-in-law
- Akiko Kazami as Seiko Tomiyasu
- Haruko Sugimura as Matsu Murata, Michiyo's mother
- Ranko Hanai as Koyoshi Dohya
- Hiroshi Nihon'yanagi as Kazuo Takenaka
- Keiju Kobayashi as Shinzo Murata, Michiyo's brother
- Akira Oizumi as Yoshitaro Taniguchi
- Ichiro Shimizu as Hatsunosuke's colleague
- Haruo Tanaka as Jihei Maruyama
- Sō Yamamura as Ryuichiro Okamoto
- Chieko Nakakita as Keiko Yamakita

== Production ==
Repast was the first of a series of six films directed by Naruse based on works by Fumiko Hayashi, "a novelist whose pessimistic outlook matched his own" (Alexander Jacoby). It also marked a successful return for Naruse, whose films of the preceding 15 years were regarded as lesser works by critics. According to screenwriter Toshirō Ide, he and his co-writer Sumie Tanaka had wanted to finish the story with the couple's divorce, but this was vetoed by the studio in favour of a conclusion with, as contemporary critic Takao Toda put it, "mass appeal". As a result, Tanaka left the project prematurely.

== Legacy ==
Repast was screened at the Museum of Modern Art in 1985 and at the Harvard Film Archive in 2005 as part of their retrospectives on Mikio Naruse.

== Awards ==
- Blue Ribbon Award for Best Film, Best Actress (Setsuko Hara), Best Supporting Actress (Haruko Sugimura) and Best Screenplay (Sumie Tanaka, for Repast, Boyhood and Wagaya wa tanoshi)
- Mainichi Film Award for Best Film, Best Actress (Setsuko Hara), Best Director (Mikio Naruse), Best Cinematography (Masao Tamai) and Best Sound Recording (Masao Fujiyoshi)
