= Katori =

Katori can refer to:

== Places ==
- Katori Sea, was an inland sea in Japan
- Katori, Chiba, a city in Japan
- Katori District, Chiba
- Katori Shrine
- Katori Station, junction passenger railway station

== People ==
- Masaru Katori, author
- Hidetoshi Katori, physicist
- Shingo Katori, actor, singer, member of the Japanese idol group SMAP

== Ships ==
- Japanese ship Katori
- Japanese battleship Katori, a battleship launched in 1905 and scrapped in 1924
- Katori Maru, an ocean liner and troop ship completed in 1913 and sunk in 1941
- Katori Maru, a cargo ship launched in 1938 and sunk in 1945
- Japanese cruiser Katori, a cruiser launched in 1939 and sunk in 1944
- JMSDF Katori (TV-3501), a training ship commissioned in 1969 and withdrawn in 1998

== Other ==
- Tenshin Shōden Katori Shintō-ryū, a Japanese martial art named after the Katori Shrine

== See also ==
- Katora, a village in Madhya Pradesh, India
- Katora, Punjab, a village in Punjab, India
