= Kashima Maru (1913) =

Japanese ocean liner

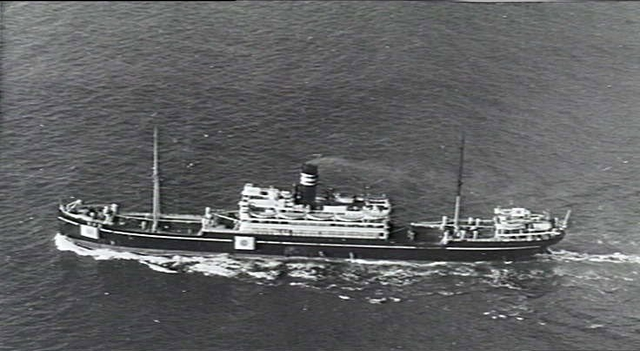
- SS Kashima Maru, c. 1941

History

Empire of Japan
- Name: Kashima Maru (1912–1938); Kasima Maru (1938–1943)
- Namesake: Kashima
- Operator: Nippon Yusen (NYK)
- Builder: Kawasaki Dockyard Company, Kobe, Japan
- Yard number: 362
- Laid down: 1912
- Launched: 8 June 1913
- Completed: 28 October 1913
- In service: 25 November 1913
- Out of service: 27 September 1943
- Identification: call sign JKXD
- Fate: Torpedoed and sunk in the South China Sea while underway from Mako Guard District to Cap Saint-Jacques

General characteristics
- Type: twin-screw steamer
- Tonnage: 9,908 GRT
- Length: 490 ft (150 m)
- Beam: 61 ft (19 m)
- Draught: 28 ft 5 in (8.66 m)
- Depth: 36 ft 6 in (11.13 m)
- Speed: 16 knots (30 km/h; 18 mph)
- Range: 10,000 nmi (19,000 km; 12,000 mi)
- Capacity: 112 first class; 56 second class; 186 steerage class; 354 total

SS Kashima Maru (鹿島丸, Kashima maru) was a Japanese steam ocean liner owned by Nippon Yusen Kaisha (NYK). The ship was built in 1912–1913 by Kawasaki Dockyard Company in Kobe, Japan.

== Background ==
Kashima Maru and sister ship Katori Maru were built to replace Aki Maru and Tango Maru. Three other sister ships were also built. (Note: Namely, Yasaka Maru, Fushimi Maru and Suwa Maru.) Unlike Katori Maru, which was decorated by Japanese, Kashima Maru was decorated by European designers from Waring & Gillow.

== Details ==
Kashima Maru was laid down in 1912, and built by the Kawasaki Dockyard Company in Kobe, Japan. Unlike its sister ship which had three screws, Kashima Maru was a twin-screw steamer with a gross register tonnage of 9,908 and a displacement of 19,200 tons. It had a length of 490 feet (150 m), a beam of 61 feet (19 m), a depth of 36 feet 6 inches (11.13 m), and a draught of 28 feet 5 inches (8.66 m). Kashima Maru had a normal speed of 16 knots (30 km/h; 18 mph).

Kashima Maru was able to accommodate 112 first-class passengers, 56 second-class passengers and 186 steerage passengers.

== Civilian career ==
On 8 June 1913, Kashima Maru was launched. Guests present include Governor Hattori Ichizo and Baron Renpei Kondo, president of Nippon Yusen Kaisha. On 25 November, Kashima Maru began her maiden voyage from Japan to London.

During the outbreak of World War I in August 1914, Kashima Maru was scheduled to transported mobilised German reservists from Singapore to Tsingtau, Kiautschou Bay Leased Territory. However, they were refused passage. Some of them were able to circumvent the restriction by sailing to Java on SS Edendale, and then boarded another ship towards Tsingtau.

In May 1917, Kashima Maru was chartered by South Manchuria Railway to operate a cargo service between Dairen and Hong Kong.

In March 1921, three crew members were arrested for attempting to smuggle 36 bottles of whiskey from Kobe to America. On 11 October 1921, a collision occurred between Kashima Maru and Amur Maru in the Port of Yokohama. Kashima Maru sustained no damages, but Amur Maru had its docking bridge carried away and its stern dented in. In May 1922, to cope with the increased demand to Europe, Kashima Maru replaced Shidzuoka Maru on the route from Japan to London.

In September 1936, Kashima Maru transported most of the Japanese Olympians for the 1936 Summer Olympics. In October 1937, to protest against Japanese activity in China, Chinese dockers refused to load goods on Kashima Maru. Under orders from their leaders in Paris, dockers in Marseille also refused to unload the cargo from the steamer. In March 1938, dockers in Middlesbrough and London also refused to load the steamer, along with two other vessels—SS Haruna Maru and SS Asaka Maru. As such, Nippon Yusen Kaisha removed Middlesbrough from its schedules.

== Military career ==
On 9 August 1941, Kashima Maru arrived at Sydney. Passengers aboard included Japanese consul-general to Australia Itsuo Goto, and almost 70 Polish refugees who escaped to Japan through Russia after the Invasion of Poland. On 15 August 1941, Kashima Maru began its last passenger voyage, repatriating 113 Japanese nationals back to Japan. On 22 August, it docked at Brisbane and picked up 8 Japanese nationals. During World War II, Kashima Maru was requisitioned by the Imperial Japanese Army as a transport ship.

On 27 September 1943, Kashima Maru was sunk in the South China Sea (10°14′N 109°45′E) by USS Bonefish, while underway from Mako Guard District to Cap Saint-Jacques.

== See also ==
- List of ocean liners
- Foreign commerce and shipping of the Empire of Japan
