= Kaitarō Hasegawa =

Japanese novelist and translator

- 長谷川海太郎
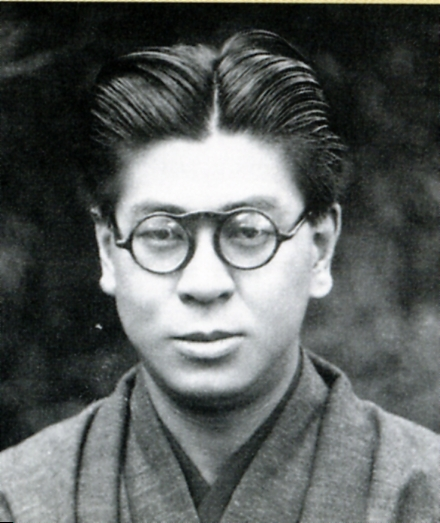
- Hasegawa Kaitarō (Hayashi Fubō)
- Born: 17 January 1900; Akadomari, Niigata, Japan
- Died: 29 June 1935 (aged 35); Kamakura, Kanagawa, Japan
- Resting place: Myohon-ji, Kamakura, Japan
- Occupation: Writer
- Writing career
- Language: Japanese

Kaitarō Hasegawa (長谷川海太郎, Hasegawa Kaitarō; 17 January 1900 – 29 June 1935) was a Japanese novelist and translator during the early Shōwa period. Hasegawa wrote works in various genres under numerous pen names, each with a unique personality, and caused a sensation with the sheer brilliance of his fiction, non-fiction and translations.

== Early life ==
Kaitarō Hasegawa was born on 17 January 1900 on Sado Island in the village of Akadomari, Sado District (present-day Sado), Niigata Prefecture, the eldest son of Kiyoshi Hasegawa, a newspaper journalist and former English teacher at the local junior high school. Hasegawa's brother was novelist Shirō Hasegawa. His older brother was a painter, and his younger brother was a translator of Russian literature. His family relocated to Hakodate, Hokkaidō, when he was young and Hasegawa was exposed to a cosmopolitan environment with many foreign influences at an early age. He was accepted at Meiji University in Tokyo, but in 1918 quit his studies and travelled to the United States on the Nippon Yusen steamer Katori Maru, and worked as a cook while studying at Oberlin College in Ohio. It is not certain whether or not he actually graduated, but in August 1920, he decided to leave school and experience life by wandering all over the United States sightseeing and taking notes on his experiences. In 1924, he returned to Japan by working his way on cargo vessels, via South America, Australia and Dalian in the Kwantung Leased Territory, from which he went overland via Korea back to Japan. He intended to return across the Pacific to complete an around-the-world journey, but was refused a visa due to increasingly restrictive immigration rules by the United States, and decided to remain in Japan to try his luck as a writer.

== Literary career ==
Soon after his return to Japan in 1924, Hasegawa used the pen-name of Tani Jōji (谷譲次) and submitted stories to the literary magazines Shin-Seinen (New Youth) and Chūō Kōron (Central Review) starting in 1925. The same year, he married Kazuko Katori, who was an English translator. Lacking money, the couple lived in a rented room in a small temple in the Zaimokuza neighborhood of Kamakura, while Hasegawa worked as a lecturer at the nearby Kamakura Women's Upper School. However, his efforts as an author were successful, especially stories with a humorous twist, which grew into a popular series describing cosmopolitan life based on his experiences in the United States, called Meriken Jappu. The first volume in this series, Jappu shobai orai (A Jap Businessman's Guide) was published in 1927.

Hasegawa also wrote semi-historical novels under the pen-name Hayashi Fubō (林不忘), which were serialized in the Tokyo Nichi Nichi Shimbun and Osaka Mainichi Shinbun. In Shimpan Ooka Seidan (1927–1928), his main protagonist was Tange Sazen, a one-eyed, one-armed super-swordsman. The character was an immediate best-seller, and was quickly adapted for the cinema, with four studios competing simultaneously to issue screen versions of Hasegawa's stories beginning in 1928.

In 1928, Chūō Kōron sponsored a round-the-world trip for Hasegawa, together with his wife, lasting for one year, in exchange for essays and stories set in each port of call. The couple visited fourteen countries, and during this time, Hasegawa used the pen-name Maki Itsuma (牧逸馬), to write true-life mystery novels, and stories about sophisticated city life in Tokyo and other locations, which drew in a large female fan base. His wife also wrote articles about London and Paris during this trip, which were published in the women's literary magazine Fujin Kōron (Women's Review).

On his return to Japan, Hasegawa was offered the use of a suite at the Imperial Hotel, Tokyo, but from 1929 settled in Kamakura, where he remained until his death in 1935 of acute bronchial asthma. His grave is at the temple of Myohon-ji in Kamakura.
