= Daisuke Katō =

Japanese actor (1911–1975)

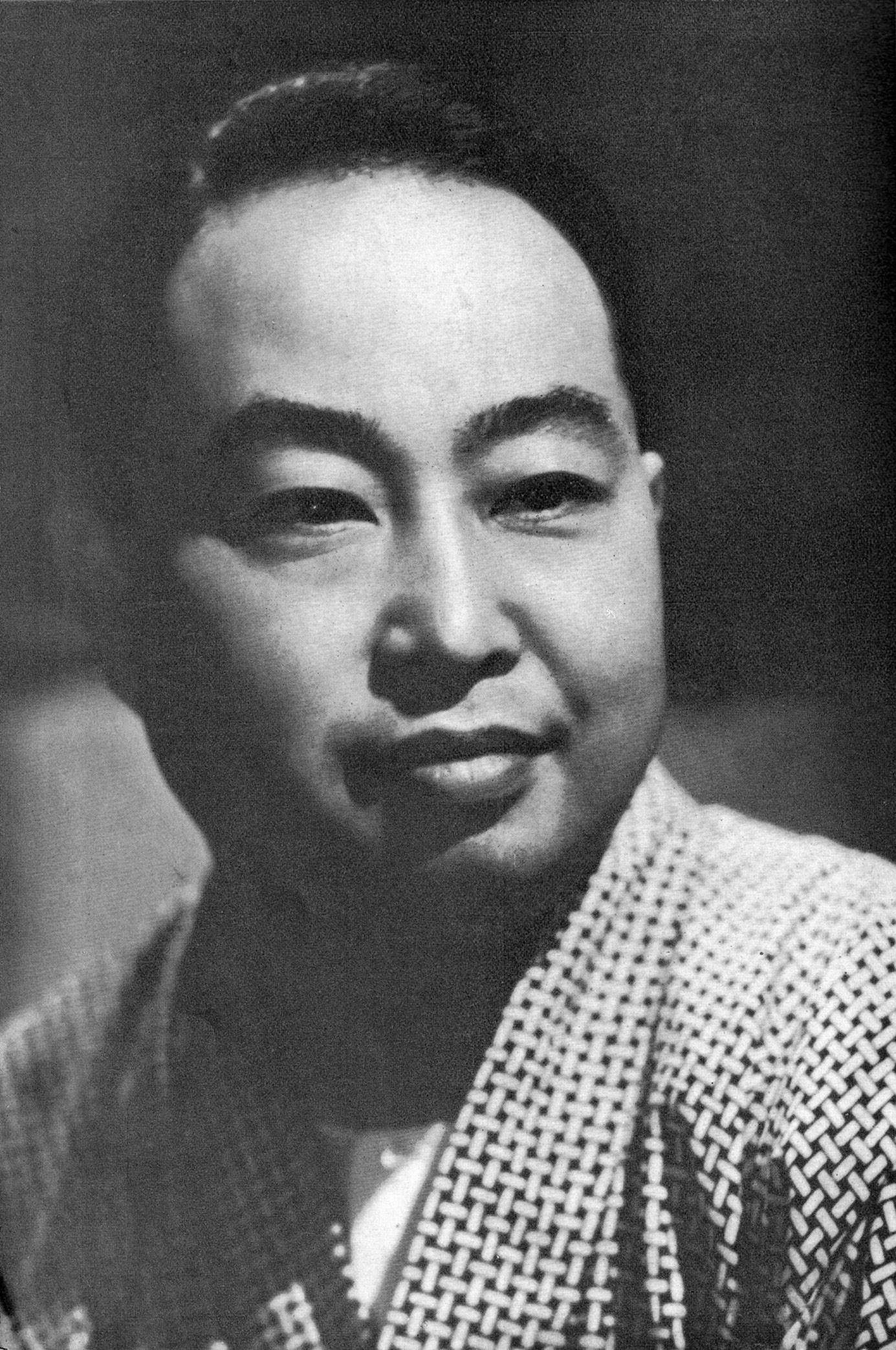
- Daisuke Katō in 1956
- Born: Tokunosuke Katō; February 18, 1911; Asakusa, Tokyo, Japan
- Died: July 31, 1975 (aged 64); Takasaki, Gunma, Japan
- Resting place: Shunjuen Cemetery, Kawasaki, Kanagawa
- Occupation: Actor
- Years active: 1936–1974
- Relatives: Kazuko Kurosawa (daughter-in-law); Kunitaro Sawamura (brother); Sadako Sawamura (sister)

Daisuke Katō (加東 大介, Katō Daisuke; February 18, 1911 – July 31, 1975) was a Japanese actor. He appeared in over 200 films, including Akira Kurosawa's Seven Samurai, Rashomon, Yojimbo, and Ikiru. He also worked repeatedly for noted directors such as Yasujirō Ozu, Mikio Naruse and Kenji Mizoguchi.

== Career ==
Born as Tokunosuke Katō to a theatrical family, his older brother was the actor Kunitarō Sawamura and his older sister the actress Sadako Sawamura. He joined the Zenshinza Theatre Company in 1933 and appeared in a number of stage and film productions under the stage name Enji Ichikawa, including Sadao Yamanaka's Humanity and Paper Balloons and Kenji Mizoguchi's The 47 Ronin. After spending the war in New Guinea, he returned to Japan and signed with the Daiei Film studio, appearing now under the name Daisuke Katō.

In addition to appearing in traditional jidaigeki roles, notably as one of Kurosawa's Seven Samurai, Katō became a popular everyman in contemporary shōshimin-eiga movies. His transfer to Toho in 1951 was an astute career choice, as he emerged as one of the studio's most prolific performers. Toho leveraged Katō's cherubic appeal, featuring him heavily in promotional materials, and his celebrity grew beyond the typical status of a supporting player. In the late 50's, Katō's capacity as a headliner was confirmed by his role as the central character in the series of adaptations of the Shishi Bunroku novel Ōban; scholar Donald Richie noted Katō’s “perfect interpretation” of the portly go-getter in the popular tetralogy. Katō also co-starred in major releases, including Toho's Company President (Shachō) comedies.

His 1961 book about his wartime experiences, Minami no shima ni yuki ga furu (Snow in the South Seas), was adapted by Toho as a showcase for Katō, who was top-billed, paired with major studio comic actor Junzaburō Ban (who received the only other solo screen credit), and supported with guest appearances by A-list Toho stars Hisaya Morishige, Tatsuya Mihashi, Keiju Kobayashi, and Frankie Sakai. The book later became an NHK television drama, a stage play, and a second film.

== Honors ==
Daisuke Katō won the Blue Ribbon Award and Mainichi Film Concours for Best Supporting Actor in 1952 for Kettō Kagiya no Tsuji and Mother, and the Blue Ribbon Award in 1954 for Bloody Spear at Mount Fuji and Koko ni izumi ari.

On June 7, 1963, Katō was the subject of the Asahi Shimbun Interview, a distinction reserved for notable members of the arts, sports, political, and business communities.

In 2008, Katō was one of the actors commemorated in the Seven Supporting Characters film festival held at the now-defunct Cinema Artone in Tokyo's Shimokitazawa entertainment district.

== Family ==
Kato's nephews are the actors Masahiko Tsugawa and Hiroyuki Nagato. His son, Haruyuki Katō, married Kazuko Kurosawa, the costume designer and daughter of Akira Kurosawa. His grandson by Harayuki and Kazuko is actor Takayuki Kato.

== Selected filmography ==
- Kōchiyama Sōshun (河内山宗俊) (1936) - Kenta
- Humanity and Paper Balloons (人情紙風船 Ninjō kami fūsen) (1937) - Isuke - Yatagoro henchman
- Abe ichizoku (1938)
- The 47 Ronin (元禄忠臣蔵 Genroku chushingura) (1941) - Fuwa Kazuemon (uncredited)
- Bosu (1949)
- Bangaku Edo e yuku (1949)
- Saheiji torimonohikae: Murasaki zukin (1949) - Yasu
- Saheiji torimonohikae: Murasaki zukin - Kaiketsu-hen (1949) - Yasu
- Shinshaku Yotsuya kaidan: kōhen (1949) - Shinkichi
- Onna koroshi abura jigoku (1949)
- Tengu hikyaku (1949)
- Nippon G Men: Dai-ni-wa - Nansenzaki no kettō (1950)
- Ore wa yojinbo (1950)
- Harukanari haha no kuni (1950) - Tommy Shōkyokusai
- Rashomon (羅生門 Rashōmon) (1950) - Policeman
- Akagi Kara kita otoko (1950)
- Gorotsuki-bune (1950) - Sōkichi
- Oboro kago (1951)
- Tsuki no wataridori (1951) - Matagorō
- Jiyū gakkō (1951) - Takayama
- Joshu Garasu (1951)
- Mesu inu (1951) - Matoba
- Vendetta for a Samurai (1952) - Rokusuke
- The Life of Oharu (1952) - Tasaburo Hishiya
- Zoku Shurajō hibun - Hiun no maki (1952) - Inosuke
- Mother (おかあさん Okāsan) (1952) - Uncle Kimura
- Yonjū-hachinin me no otoko (1952)
- Shanhai no onna (1952) - Liu, Ding's men
- Ikiru (1952) - Yakuza
- Ashi ni sawatta onna (1952)
- Fuun senryobune (1952)
- Jinsei gekijo: dai ichi bu/dai ni bu (1952)
- Edokko hangan (1953)
- Pu-san (1953)
- Yasugorō shusse (1953)
- Aoiro kakumei (1953) - Takegoro Inugai
- Jirochō sangokushi: hatsu iwai Shimizu Minato (1953)
- Kaiketsu Murasaki-zukin: Sōshūban (1953)
- Jirochō sangokushi: seizoroi Shimizu Minato (1953)
- Yonin no haha (1954)
- Seven Samurai (七人の侍 Shichinin no Samurai) (1954) - Shichirōji
- Shiosai (1954) - Chiyoko's Father, the lighthouse keeper
- Watashi no subete o (1954)
- Late Chrysanthemums (1954) - Itaya
- Toran būran: Tsuki no hikari (1954) - Private Sasaki
- Dorodarake no seishun (1954) - Miyamori, publicity manager
- Samurai I: Musashi Miyamoto (1954) - Toji
- Tarao bannai hayabusa no maō (1955)
- Floating Clouds (1955) - Seikichi Mukai
- Koko ni izumi ari (1955)
- Bloody Spear at Mount Fuji (血槍富士 Chiyari Fuji) (1955) - Genta
- No Time for Tears (1955) - Magazine reporter
- Tōjūrō no Koi (藤十郎の恋) (1955) - Kichisuke
- Tasogare sakaba (1955) - Kibe
- Samurai II: Duel at Ichijoji Temple (続宮本武蔵 一乗寺の決闘 Zoku Miyamoto Musashi: Ichijōji no kettō) (1955) - Tōji Gion
- The Lone Journey (旅路 Tabiji) aka The Road (1955)
- Mune yori mune ni (1955) - Hazama
- Samurai III: Duel at Ganryu Island (1956) - Toji Gion
- Sudden Rain (1956) - Kawakami
- Early Spring (1956) - Sakamoto
- Izumi (1956)
- Kengō nitōryū (1956) - Kamo Jinnai
- Street of Shame (赤線地帯 Akasen chitai) (1956) - president of Brothel Owners' Association
- Tsuma no kokoro (1956)
- Shiroi magyo (1956)
- Gendai no yokubō (1956) - Inoue
- Onibi (1956)
- Ani to sono musume (1956) - Hayashi
- Arashi (1956) - Ishii
- Gogo 8 ji 13 pun (1956) - Keisaku Yatabe
- Flowing (1956) - Yoneko's ex
- Itohan monogatari (1957) - Matsukichi
- Ôban (1957) - Ushinosuke Akaba
- Wasureji no gogo 8 ji 13 pun (1957) - Police Detective Yatabe
- Snow Country (1957)
- Untamed (1957) - Her second husband
- Salaryman shusse taikōki (1957) - Hajime Sōda
- Zoku Ôban: Fūun hen (1957) - Ushinosuke Akaba
- Ippon-gatana dohyō iri (1957) - Mohei Komagata
- Zoku sarariman shussetai kōki (1957)
- Zokuzoku Ôban: Dotō hen (1957) - Ushinotsuke Akabane
- Shachō sandaiki (1958)
- Futari dake no hashi (1958) - Takeshi Saitō
- Zoku shachō sandaiki (1958)
- A Holiday in Tokyo (1958) - Sales Manager
- Yajikata dōchū sugoroku (1958) - Yajirobei Tochimen'ya
- Anzukko (1958) - Suga
- Oban kanketsu hen (1958)
- Shu to midori (1958)
- Summer Clouds (1958)
- Zokuzoku sarariman shussetai kōki (1958)
- Wakai musumetachi (1958) - Zenkichi Shibata - Sumiko's father
- Kami no taisho (1958)
- Hadaka no taishō (1958) - Master of Restaurant
- Yajikita dōchū sugoroku (1958) - Yajirobei Tochimen'ya
- Shachō taiheiki (1959) - Gōnosuke Asahina
- Zoku shachō taiheiki (1959)
- Kitsune to tanuki (1959)
- Sarariman shussetai koki daiyonbu (1959) - Hajime
- Daigaku no nijuhachin (1959)
- Moro no Ichimatsu yūrei dochu (1959)
- Shin santō jūyaku (1959) - Kumehei Onizuka
- Uwayaku, shitayaku, godōyaku (1959)
- Wakai koibitotachi (1959) - Renzō Dōjima
- The Three Treasures (1959) - God Fudetama
- Osorubeki hiasobi (1959)
- Yari hitosuji nihon bare (1959) - Genshin Tawaraboshi
- Watashi wa kai ni naritai (1959)
- Kiri aru jyoji (1959)
- Shiranami gonin otoko: tenka no ō-dorobō (1960)
- Shin santō jūyaku: Tabi to onna to sake no maki (1960)
- Yama no kanata ni - Dai ichi-bu: Ringo no hoo: Dai ni-bu: Sakana no seppun (1960) - Yakichi Wada
- Hito mo arukeba (1960) - Namigoro Namiki
- Sarariman shussetai kōki daigobu (1960) - Hajime
- Kunisada Chūji (1960) - Enzo Niko
- Hawai Middowei daikaikūsen: Taiheiyō no arashi (1960)
- Shin santō jūyaku: Ataru mo hakke no maki (1960) - Uchū Takeda
- Musume tsuma haha (1960) - Shusuke Tetsumoto
- Taiyō o dake (1960) - Kyōsuke Tsumura
- Shin santo juyaku: teishu kyo iku no maki (1960)
- Shin jōdaigaku (1960)
- Gametsui yatsu (1960)
- Aki tachinu (1960) - Tomioka - The Lover
- Kane-dukuri taikō-ki (1960) - Hirayama, Shūhei
- When a Woman Ascends the Stairs (1960) - Matsukichi Sekine
- Jiyūgaoka fujin (1960)
- Zoku sararîman Chūshingura (1961) - Jyusaburo Onodera
- Yojimbo (用心棒 Yōjinbō) (1961) - Inokichi - Ushitora's Rotund Brother
- Zoku shachō dochuki: onna oyabun taiketsu no maki (1961)
- Shachō dōchūki (1961)
- Honkon no yoru (1961)
- The End of Summer (1961) - Kitagawa Yanosuke
- Ganba (1961)
- Kigeki ekimae bentō (1961)
- Salary man Shimizu minato (1962) - Ômasa
- Onna no za (1962) - Tamura Ryokichi, Matsuyo no otto
- Zoku sararîman shimizu minato (1962)
- Ika naru hoshi no moto ni (1962) - Sōtarō
- Shachō yōkōki (1962)
- Zoku shachō yōkōki (1962)
- Ottamage ningyo monogatari (1962) - Heiroku Tsubaki
- Star of Hong Kong (1962) - Shūhei
- Shin kitsune to tanuki (1962)
- Hōrō-ki (1962) - Nobuo Sadaoka
- Chūshingura (1962) - Kichiemon Terasaka
- An Autumn Afternoon (1962) - Yoshitarō Sakamoto
- Kawa no hotori de (1962) - Kenkichi Takayama
- Kigeki: Detatoko shōbu - 'Chinjarara monogatari' yori (1962) - Nishiyama
- Shachō manyūki (1963)
- Onna ni tsuyoku naru kufū no kazukazu (1963) - Daizō Sugishita
- Zoku shachō manyūki (1963)
- Shachō gaiyūki (1963)
- Kureji sakusen: Sentehisshō (1963)
- Kigeki: Tonkatsu ichidai (1963) - Denji Tamaki
- Minami no shima ni yuki ga furu (1963)
- Zoku shachō gaiyūki (1963)
- Kigeki ekimae chagama (1963)
- Miren (1963) - Master at 'Sekine'
- Onna no rekishi (1963)
- Warera sarariman (1963)
- Shachō shinshiroku (1964)
- Kigeki ekimae okami (1964) - Rikizō Kawaguchi
- Zoku shachō shinshiroku (1964)
- Ore wa bodigado (1964)
- Samé (1964) - Genji
- Hadaka no jūyaku (1964) - Tadokori - Executive
- Nippon paradaisu (1964) - Daiten Kuramoto
- Kuro no chōtokkyu (1964) - Nakae
- Danchi: Nanatsu no taizai (1964) - Ichirō Mitani
- Shachō ninpōchō (1965)
- Zoku shachō ninpōchō (1965) - Tyuzo Togashi
- Hi no ataru isu (1965) - Natsuki Shibusawa
- Radishes and Carrots (1965) - Bit Part
- Sanshiro Sugata (1965) - Hansuke Murai
- Senjo ni nagareru uta (1965) - Yamamoto
- Aku no kaidan (1965) - Konishi
- Shachō gyōjōki (1966)
- Abare Gōemon (1966) - Budeuemon Hattori
- The Stranger Within a Woman (1966)
- Zoku shachō gyōjōki (1966) - Tyuzo Togashi
- Hikinige (1966) - Kawashima
- Nakano Spy School (1966) - Lieutenant Kusanagi
- Rikugun Nakano gakko: Kumoichigō shirei (1966) - Kusanagi
- The Daphne (1966) - Shimada
- Akogare (1966)
- Shachō senichiya (1967)
- Rikugun Nakano gakko: Ryu-sango shirei (1967)
- Mesu ga osu o kuikorosu: Kamakiri (1967) - Gunpei Otaguro
- Zoku izuko e (1967)
- Zoku namonaku mazushiku utsukushiku: Haha to ko (1967) - Taro
- Chichi to ko: Zoku Na mo naku mazushiku utsukushiku (1967) - Shintaro Sakai
- Zoku shachō senichiya (1967)
- Rikugun Nakano gakko: Mitsumei (1967)
- Japan's Longest Day (1967) - Kenjiro Yabe - NHK Domestic Bureau Director
- Kigeki: Ippatsu shōbu (1967) - Tadashi Ninomiya
- Scattered Clouds (1967) - Hayashida
- Nise keiji (1967)
- Shachō hanjōki (1968)
- Zoku shacho hanjōki (1968)
- Rikugun Nakano gakkō: Kaisen zen'ya (1968)
- Bakuchi-uchi: Nagurikomi (1968) - Kichigorō
- Niji no naka no remon (1968) - Gōzō Maeda
- Rengō kantai shirei chōkan: Yamamoto Isoroku (1968) - Chief of Press Section
- Kōdōkan hamonjō (1968) - Junpei Sekine
- Shachō enmachō (1969)
- Zoku shachō enmachō (1969)
- Shachō gaku ABC (1970)
- Zoku shachō gaku ABC (1970)
- Futari dake no asa (1971)
- Showa hito keta shachō tai futaketa shain (1971)
- Zoku Showa hito keta shachō tai futaketa shain: Getsu-getsu kasui moku kinkin (1971)
- Hajimete no tabi (1972)
- Tokyo do mannaka (1974)
