= Kōchiyama Sōshun =

Kōchiyama Sōshun (河内山 宗春, died August 27, 1823) was a historical Japanese person. A servant at Edo Castle in Japan, he became a model for characters in kōdan, kabuki, film and television. Works of fiction sometimes write the name with a different final character as 河内山宗俊 or 河内山宗心.

A man of Edo, Sōshun served as a cha-bōzu in the administrative headquarters of the Tokugawa shogunate. The function of a cha-bōzu was to oversee the provision of personal service and serving of meals, and to run errands, for high-ranking officials like the shōgun and daimyō at the castle. In 1808, he lost his assignment, and formed a band of outlaws with gamblers and unruly gokenin, engaging in extortion and other activities. He was arrested in 1823, and died in custody.

No record of the verdict against him survives. This has given authors a free hand to embellish his story. They portray him as a villain with free rein to commit crimes as he pleases, or a champion of the oppressed masses against the evil people in power. A historical treatment of him is the Kōchiyama Jitsuden. In the early Meiji period the kōdan Tenpō Rokka-sen was completed by Matsubayashi Hakuen II. Here, Sōshun is not a cha-bōzu but an osukiya-bōzu, a servant who overseas tea service and articles for tea ceremonies. The centerpiece of the kōdan is Sōshun's swindling of the Matsue Domain. In 1874, Kawatake Mokuami added further embellishments to Hakuen's story, and the resulting kabuki play, Kumono-ueno San'e no Sakumae, had its premiere performance. Mokuami further developed the story, and in 1881, Kumo ni magou Ueno no Hatsuhana opened at the Shintomi-za in Tokyo with Ichikawa Danjūrō IX portraying Sōshun. The play is in the current repertoire.

An early film including Sōshun as a character was the 1928 Teikoku Kinema silent Tenpō Doro Ezōshi. The 1936 Kōchiyama Sōshun, directed by Sadao Yamanaka, starred Kawarasaki Chōjūrō IV. Kunio Watanabe directed Roppa Furukawa in the 1951 Gokuraku Rokkasen. Four years later, the story appeared again in Kiyoshi Saeki's 1955 Toei film Tenpō Rokudōsen Hirado no Kaizoku, starring Ryūnosuke Tsukigata. Masahiro Makino directed Toei's 1960 Tenpō Rokkasen Jigoku no Hanamichi, starring Utaemon Ichikawa.

Sōshun's television debut took place in 1975, with the series Tsūkai! Kōchiyama Sōshun. Shintaro Katsu starred in the 26-episode series on Fuji Television. Kōji Ishizaka played the nemesis Sōshun in NHK's 1996 Appare Yajūrō, with Hiroshi Abe as the title character Yajūrō.

== See also ==
- Kōchiyama Sōshun (1936 film)
