= Kan'emon Nakamura =

Japanese actor (1901–1982)

- 中村 翫右衛門
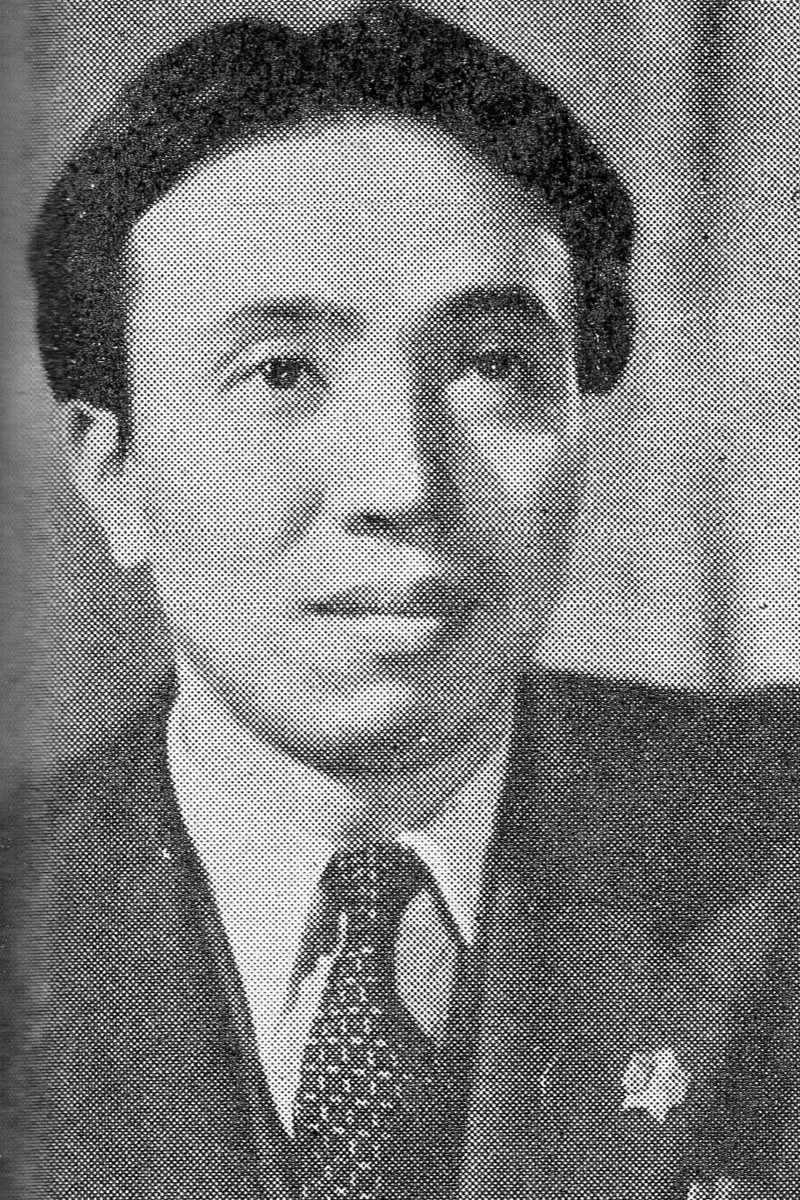
- Nakamura c. 1954
- Born: Kinjirō Mitsui (三井 金次郎, Mitsui Kinjirō); February 2, 1901; Shitaya, Tokyo, Empire of Japan
- Died: September 21, 1982 (aged 81); Tokyo, Japan
- Other name: Umenosuke Nakamura III (1911–1920)
- Occupation: Actor
- Years active: 1906–1982
- Spouse: Haruko Machida (m. 1928; died 1957)
- Children: 1

Kan'emon Nakamura III (三代目 中村 翫右衛門, Sandaime Nakamura Kan'emon; February 2, 1901 – September 21, 1982) was a Japanese actor and political activist. Best known in Japan for performing in kabuki theatre, he co-founded Zenshinza, Japan's oldest and largest repertory theatre company, in 1931. He also appeared in numerous films, most notably Humanity and Paper Balloons (1937), The 47 Ronin (1941), Kwaidan (1964), Samurai Banners (1969), and Under the Flag of the Rising Sun (1972).

After World War II, Nakamura joined the Japanese Communist Party and was targeted during the Red Purge. In 1952, following a violent confrontation with authorities during a Zenshinza tour, he fled to China, living in exile until 1955. While abroad, he served as deputy leader and acting chairman of the Japanese delegation at the 1952 Asia and Pacific Rim Peace Conference in Beijing. Upon his return to Japan, he resumed acting and leadership of Zenshinza, guiding the company until his death in 1982.

== Life and career ==
Nakamura was born Kinjirō Mitsui (三井 金次郎, Mitsui Kinjirō) on February 2, 1901, in Shitaya, Tokyo (now Taitō, Tokyo). His father, Kan'emon Nakamura II, was a kabuki actor and theatre manager who encouraged his son to pursue a stage career. In 1906, at the age of five, Nakamura made his debut at his father's theatre, portraying a crow tengu in the play Yamauba. In November 1911, he and his father became disciples of Nakamura Utaemon V, and Nakamura adopted the stage name Umenosuke Nakamura III (三代目中村梅之助).

In March 1920, Nakamura succeeded to the name Kan'emon Nakamura III (三代目 中村 翫右衛門, Sandaime Nakamura Kan'emon) and was promoted to a leading role at the prestigious Kabuki-za theatre. Frustrated by limited opportunities in smaller venues and the rigid traditions of the Shochiku monopoly, he left the company in 1929, criticizing its hierarchical structure. In 1927, he made his film debut with Sonno Joi and A Diary of Chuji's Travels. The year thereafter, he married Haruko Machida, daughter of rakugoka Danshūrō Enshi. She died in August 1957. They had a child together named Umenosuke Nakamura.

In 1931, seeking to innovate kabuki while breaking free from Shochiku's control, Kan'emon III co-founded Zenshinza (前進座, "Progressive Theatre Company") with Kawarasaki Chōjūrō IV and Kawarasaki Kunitarō V. The troupe pioneered an independent repertory model, blending traditional kabuki with modern shingeki and socially conscious plays. It endured wartime censorship and post-war hardships to become one of Japan's most influential theatre companies. While striving to create a new style of theater based on Kabuki, he also appeared in several films, most notably Sadao Yamanaka's Kōchiyama Sōshun (1936) and Humanity and Paper Balloons (1937). After World War II, Kan'emon III and many Zenshinza members joined the Japanese Communist Party (JCP). The troupe faced severe restrictions during the Red Purge carried out under the Allied occupation.

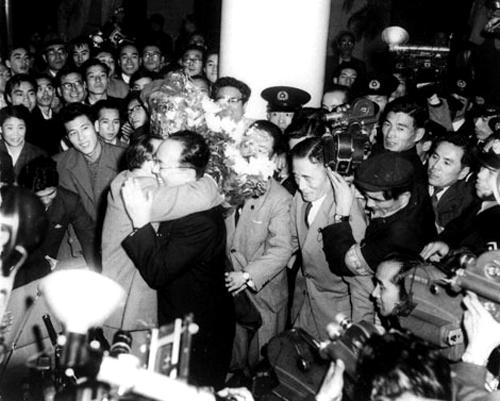
Nakamura (wearing glasses) returns to Japan in November 1955 after three years of exile in China, greeted by Kawarasaki Chōjūrō IV and supporters.

In May 1952, while touring Hokkaido, Zenshinza was prevented from using a reserved school gymnasium in Akabira by local authorities and police-supported groups. The ensuing confrontation, which became known as the Akabira Incident, led to arrests, injuries, and an arrest warrant for Kan'emon III on charges of trespassing and assault. He evaded capture for over a week, at one point appearing on stage disguised as the exiled priest Shunkan, before fleeing Japan clandestinely on a fishing boat. He reached the People's Republic of China, where he lived in exile from 1952 to 1955.

During his exile, Kan'emon participated in the October 1952 Asia and Pacific Rim Peace Conference in Beijing, serving as the acting-chief of the Japanese delegation after the original delegates were denied passports by the Japanese government. The Central Intelligence Agency referred to him as "Kanemou Nakamura" in a report on the conference.

He returned to Japan on November 6, 1955, arriving at Haneda Airport to a large welcoming crowd. Through mediation by prominent supporters, the outstanding warrant was withdrawn. He was later tried for trespassing and illegal departure, receiving a six-month suspended sentence. He resumed acting immediately, later appearing in films such as Kwaidan (1964). He also wrote several autobiographial books thereafter.

Following the 1968 expulsion of co-founder Kawarasaki from Zenshinza, Kan'emon III became the troupe's undisputed leader, a position he held until his death in Tokyo on 21 September 1982, aged 81. He was buried at Tama Cemetery.

== Filmography ==
- Sonno Joi (1927)
- A Diary of Chuji's Travels (1927)
- Kōchiyama Sōshun (1936)
- Saga of the Vagabonds, Part One: Tiger and Wolf (1937)
- Saga of the Vagabonds, Part Two: Forward at Dawn (1937)
- Humanity and Paper Balloons (1937)
- Shinsengumi (1937)
- The Abe Clan (1938)
- Oma no tsuji (1938)
- The Night Before (1939)
- Sono zen'ya (1939)
- Banzuiin Chobei (1940)
- Ôhinata-mura (1940)
- The 47 Ronin (1941)
- Miyamoto Musashi (1944)
- Dokkoi ikiteru (1951)
- Hakone fuunroku (1952)
- Escape from Hell (1963)
- Kwaidan (1964)
- Monument to the Girl's Corps (1968)
- Samurai Banners (1969)
- Tengu-to (1969)
- Shinsengumi (1969)
- Gekieiga Okinawa (1970)
- Inn of Evil (1971)
- Under the Flag of the Rising Sun (1972)
- Zatoichi: The Blind Swordsman (TV 1974–1979)
- Yokomizo Seishi shirizu (TV 1977)
- Amagi goe (1978)
- Shura no tabishite (1979)
