= Tange Sazen =

Fictional swordsman

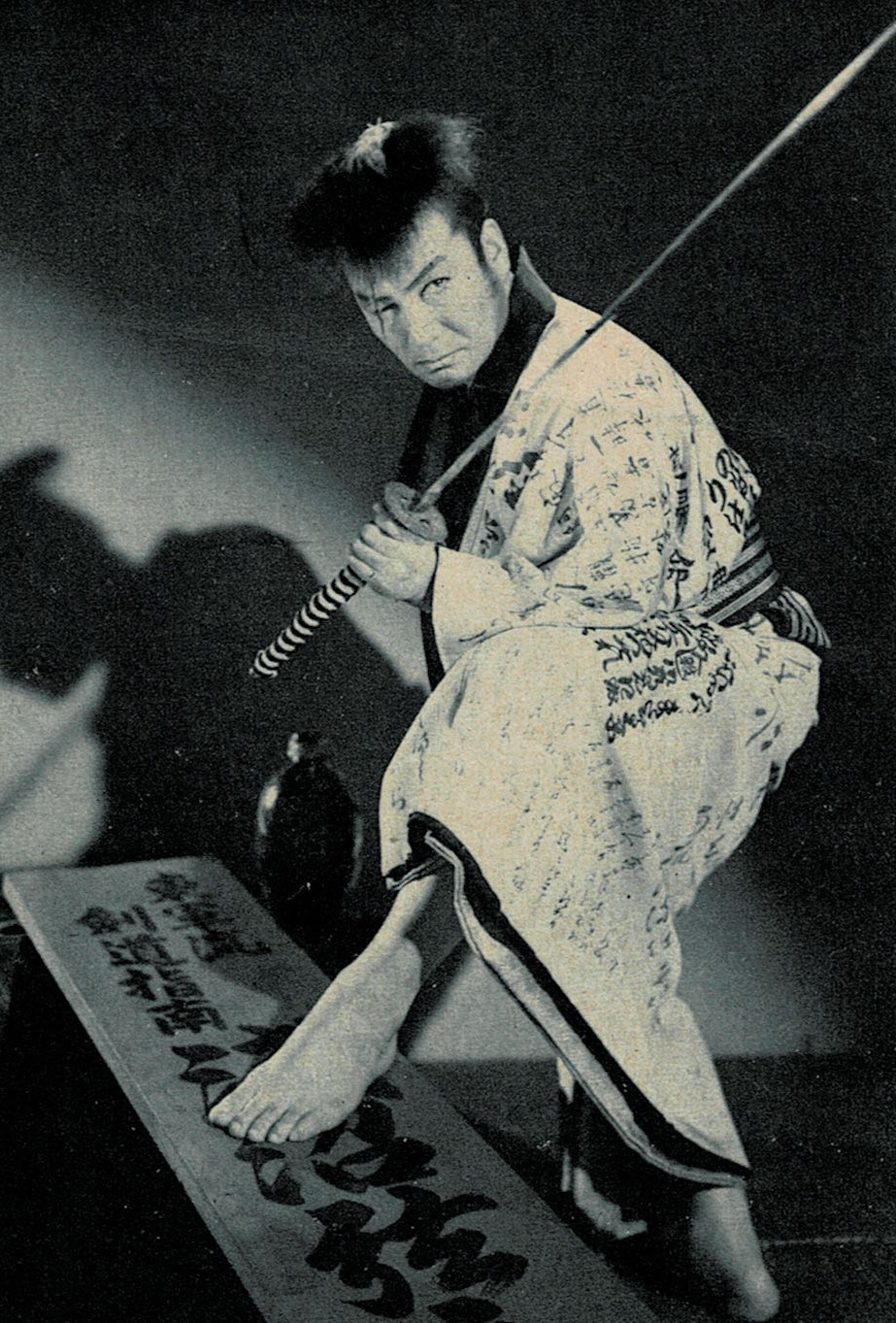
Tanzen Sazen portrayed by Ryūtarō Ōtomo

Tange Sazen (Japanese: 丹下 左膳) is a fictional swordsman featured in Japanese literature, cinema and TV. Originally a samurai member of the Sōma clan, he is attacked and mutilated, losing his right eye and right arm. He then begins to lead the life of a rōnin, using the pseudonym Sazen.

== Development ==
Tange Sazen first appeared as a minor character in a newspaper serial by Fubō Hayashi, which ran from October 1927 to May 1928 in the Mainichi Shimbun. The story mainly concerned the exploits of Ōoka Echizen, but the strikingly dramatic illustrations of Tange made by Tomiya Oda, with a scar across his right eye and an empty right sleeve, so caught the imagination of the public that within a few months three silent films about Tange were produced by different companies.

As a result of the success of these films, Hayashi wrote a new serial, Tange Sazen, with Tange as the hero. This initially ran in the Mainichi Shimbun from June to October 1933, but internal strife at the newspaper led to the interruption of publication and the serial eventually resumed in the Yomiuri Shimbun from January 1934. In this story, Tange developed from the nihilistic character he had been in the first novel to a doughty fighter against injustice.

The continued popularity of the character led to the production of the successful title Tange Sazen and the Pot Worth a Million Ryō in 1935, directed by Sadao Yamanaka and starring Denjirō Ōkōchi as a comic Tange.

Ōkōchi is the actor most identified with Tange in the cinema, but many others have played the role.

== Film ==
=== Silent films ===
Year	Transcribed title	Original title	Main actor	Director
1928	Shinban Ōoka seidan (Note: Three-part film by Toa Kinema)	新版大岡政談: 鈴川源十郎の巻; 中編; 後編	Tokumaro Dan	Gorō Hirose
1928	Shinban Ōoka seidan (Note: Two-part film by Makino Productions)	新版大岡政談: 前編; 中編	Kanjūrō Arashi	Buntarō Futagawa
1928	Shinban Ōoka seidan (Note: Three-part film by Nikkatsu)	新版大岡政談: 第一編; 第二編; 第三編	Denjirō Ōkōchi	Daisuke Itō

=== Sound films starring Denjirō Ōkōchi ===
Year	Transcribed title	Original title	Director
1933	Tange Sazen (Note: Three-part sound film by Nikkatsu)	丹下左膳: 第一編; 第二編; 解決編	Daisuke Itō
1934	Tange Sazen II: Kengeki no maki	丹下左膳 第二篇 剣戟の巻	Daisuke Itō
1935	The Million Ryo Pot	丹下左膳余話 百萬両の壺	Sadao Yamanaka
1936	Tange Sazen: Nikkō no maki	丹下左膳 日光の巻	Kunio Watanabe
1937	Tange Sazen: Aizō maken hen	丹下左膳 愛憎魔剣篇	Kunio Watanabe
1937	Tange Sazen: Kanketsu hōkō	丹下左膳 完結咆吼篇	Kunio Watanabe
1938	Shinpen Tange Sazen: Yōtō hen	新篇 丹下左膳 妖刀篇	Kunio Watanabe
1938	Shinpen Tange Sazen: Hayate-hen	新篇 丹下左膳 隻手篇	Satsuo Yamamoto
1939	Shinpen Tange Sazen: Sekigan no maki	新篇 丹下左膳 隻眼の巻	Nobuo Nakagawa
1939	Shinpen Tange Sazen: Koiguruma no maki	新篇 丹下左膳 恋車の巻	Ryō Hagiwara
1953	Tange Sazen	丹下左膳	Masahiro Makino
1953	Zoku Tange Sazen	続丹下左膳	Masahiro Makino
1954	Tange Sazen: Kokezaru no tsubo	丹下左膳 こけ猿の壺	Kenji Misumi

=== Sound films starring other actors ===
Year	Transcribed title	Original title	Main actor	Director
1936	Tange Sazen: Kan'un hissatsu no maki	丹下左膳 乾雲必殺の巻	Ryūnosuke Tsukigata	Masahiro Makino
1936	Tange Sazen: Konryū jubaku no maki	丹下左膳 坤竜呪縛の巻	Ryūnosuke Tsukigata	Masahiro Makino
1952	Tange Sazen	丹下左膳	Tsumasaburō Bandō	Sadatsugu Matsuda
1956	Tange Sazen: Ken'un no maki	丹下左膳 乾雲の巻	Michitarō Mizushima	Masahiro Makino
1956	Tange Sazen: Konryū no maki	丹下左膳 坤竜の巻	Michitarō Mizushima	Masahiro Makino
1956	Tange Sazen: Kanketsu-hen	丹下左膳 完結篇	Michitarō Mizushima	Masahiro Makino
1958	Tange Sazen	丹下左膳	Ryūtarō Ōtomo	Sadatsugu Matsuda
1959	Tange Sazen: Dotō-hen	丹下左膳 怒涛篇	Ryūtarō Ōtomo	Sadatsugu Matsuda
1960	Tange Sazen: Mysterious Sword	丹下左膳 妖刀濡れ燕	Ryūtarō Ōtomo	Sadatsugu Matsuda
1961	Tange Sazen: Nuretsubame ittōryū	丹下左膳 濡れ燕一刀流	Ryūtarō Ōtomo	Sadatsugu Matsuda
1962	Tange Sazen: Kan'unkonryū no maki	丹下左膳 乾雲坤竜の巻	Ryūtarō Ōtomo	Tai Katō
1963	Tange Sazen: Zankoku no kawa	丹下左膳	Tetsurō Tanba	Seiichirō Uchikawa
1966	Tange Sazen: Hien iaigiri	丹下左膳 飛燕居合斬り	Kinnosuke Nakamura	Hideo Gosha
2004	Tange Sazen: Hyakuman ryō no tsubo	丹下左膳 百万両の壺	Etsushi Toyokawa	Toshio Tsuda

=== Female Sazen films ===
There have also been made adaptations of Tange Sazen as a female character, known in Japanese as Onna Sazen (lit. Female Sazen or Lady Sazen).

Year	Transcribed title	Original title	Main actress	Director
1937	Onna Sazen: Dai-ichi hen - yōka no maki	女左膳 第一篇妖火の巻	Komako Hara	Nobuo Nakayama
1937	Onna Sazen: Dai-ni hen - maken no maki	女左膳 第二篇魔剣の巻	Komako Hara	Nobuo Nakayama
1950	Onna Sazen: Tsubanari mutō-ryū no maki	女左膳 鍔鳴無刀流の巻		Taizō Fuyushima
1968	Lady Sazen and the Drenched Swallow Sword	女左膳 濡れ燕片手斬り	Michiyo Okusu	Kimiyoshi Yasuda

== Television dramas ==
Years	Transcribed title	Original title	Main actor	Notes
1958–1959	Tange Sazen	丹下左膳	Tetsurō Tamba	Episodes of Yamaichi meisaku gekijō (Note: 山一名作劇場)
1960	Tange Sazen	丹下左膳	Ryūtarō Tatsumi	Episodes of Shinkokugeki Awā (Note: 新国劇アワー)
1963–1964	Tange Sazen	丹下左膳	Kon Omura	
1965–1966	Tange Sazen	丹下左膳	Takeya Nakamura	
1967–1968	Tange Sazen	丹下左膳	Matsuyama Eitaro	
1970	Tange Sazen	丹下左膳	Ken Ogata	
1971	Tange Sazen to kushimaki o fuji On'na ga horeta abarenbō	丹下左膳と櫛巻きお藤 女が惚れた暴れん坊	Tomisaburō Wakayama	Episodes of Edo kōdan hana no Nihonbashi (Note: 江戸巷談 花の日本橋)
1974	Tange sazen: Kenkon-hen	丹下左膳 乾坤篇	Kōji Takahashi	
1974	Tange Sazen: Koke saru no tsubo-hen	丹下左膳 こけ猿の壷篇	Kōji Takahashi	
1982	Tange Sazen ken-fū! Hyaku man-ryō no tsubo	丹下左膳 剣風!百万両の壺	Tatsuya Nakadai	
1990–1994	Fujita Makoto no Tange Sazen	藤田まことの丹下左膳	Makoto Fujita	Four TV specials
2004	Tange Sazen	丹下左膳	Nakamura Shidō II	

== See also ==
- Baiken, a similar video game character influenced by the Lady Sazen films
- The One-Armed Swordsman, the first title in a Hong Kong film trilogy about a similar character
