= Shinbashi Kiyozo =

Japanese singer and actress

Shinbashi Kiyozō
- 新橋 喜代三
- Shinbashi Kiyozō
- Born: 12 October 1903; Tanegashima, Kagoshima
- Died: 23 March 1963 (aged 59)
- Other names: Nakayama Yoshiko, Kiyomaru
- Occupations: Geisha, singer, actress
- Years active: 1922–1958

Shinbashi Kiyozō (新橋 喜代三, Shinbashi Kiyozō; 12 October 1903 – 23 March 1963) was a Japanese geisha and singer who also performed in a few films before World War II. Her most famous film was The Million Ryo Pot, which records not only her remarkable natural acting skill, but numerous songs she sang accompanied by a shamisen.

== Life ==
Born with the name Yoshiko, the first daughter of nine children to her father Masayoshi and mother Chika, in the area of which is now known as Nishinoomote, Kagoshima. Her family ran a grocery. When an okiya was established in town, Yoshiko began training there under the name "Yaemaru." While in Kagoshima, she grew in popularity, and performed many times for NHK radio. She also recorded some of her songs with Columbia Records.

In 1930, she met and married the songwriter Shinpei Nakayama. They met at the ryotei where Kiyozō performed, and initially impressed by her talent, Nakayama decided to write for her unique and lovely voice. Eventually, while working, the two developed a mutual attraction.

In the same year, she moved to Tokyo where Nakayama lived with his first wife. The next year, Kiyozō changed her name to Shinbashi Kiyozō (as geisha often took the place name of their area as a stage surname). She debuted her first record in Tokyo, "Washa Shiranu" in 1933.

In 1935, the increasingly popular artist performed as the lead actress in Yamanaka Sadao's film, The Million Ryo Pot. Kiyozō recorded a number of records for Columbia under the name "Kiyomaru," as well. However, she retired from public life to marry Nakayama, whose wife had died after a long illness. During this period, she went by the name Tane.

Following his death in 1952, Kiyozō rekindled her career. In 1956, Kiyozō toured America, in San Francisco, New York, Washington and Chicago, to play the shamisen at various events promoting Kagoshima and Japanese culture. When she returned, she spent the rest of her days in Atami. She died from cancer in 1963, and is interred in Tama Cemetery.

== Songs ==
Some of the songs she recorded are:

- Minyo style
  - Kagoshima Ohara-bushi
  - Kagoshima San-sagari
  - Kagoshima Hanya-bushi
  - Kagoshima Yosakoi-bushi
  - Goketsu-bushi
  - Shitanoe-bushi
  - Jousa-bushi
- Ryūkōka pop music
  - Washiya Shiranu
  - Meiji Ichidai-jo
  - Oden Jigoku no Uta
  - Kushimaki Ofuji no Uta (movie song for the "Million Ryo Pot")
  - Bakumatsu Ko-uta
  - Aosora Dochu（duet with Taro Shoji）
  - Shucho no Musume
  - 17 Shimada

== Filmography ==
- The Million Ryo Pot (1935) Nikkatsu dir: Yamanaka Sadao
- Tsumagoi Dochu (1937) Nikkatsu dir: Masuda Haruo
- Jirokichi Utazange (1937) Shochiku dir: Osone Tatsuo
