= The Million Ryo Pot =

1935 film by Sadao Yamanaka

The Million Ryo Pot 丹下左膳余話 百萬両の壺
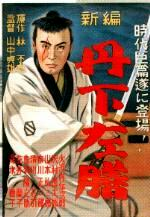
- Original Film Poster
- Directed by: Sadao Yamanaka
- Produced by: Nikkatsu
- Starring: Denjirō Ōkōchi; Shinbashi Kiyozo
- Distributed by: Nikkatsu
- Release date: 15 June 1935
- Running time: 92 minutes
- Country: Japan
- Language: Japanese

The Million Ryo Pot (also known as Tange Sazen and the Pot Worth a Million Ryō (Japanese: 丹下左膳余話 百萬両の壺, Hepburn: Tange Sazen Yowa: Hyakuman Ryō no Tsubo)) is a 1935 Japanese jidaigeki comedy film directed by Sadao Yamanaka. The plot revolves around a missing pot containing the map to a treasure worth a million ryō; this pot is eventually given to a young boy under the custody of rōnin swordsman Tange Sazen (played by Denjirō Ōkōchi). Unaware that he is in possession of such riches, Tange spends much of his time caring for the boy and bickering with the boy's adopted mother, his love interest, in a manner akin to a screwball comedy. The film is a parody of the more serious samurai films of the time, with Yamanaka transforming Tange from a rebellious, anarchic rōnin (as he was in earlier films) into a child-loving and openhearted homebody.

The film is the earliest of Yamanaka's three surviving films, with him directing it when he was 25 years old. In Japan, it is considered one of the nation's best films. In a 2009 poll of Japanese critics, Kinema Junpo ranked it the 7th best Japanese film of all time. Akira Kurosawa cited it as one of his 100 favorite films.

== Cast ==
- Denjirō Ōkōchi: Tange Sazen
- Shinbashi Kiyozō: Ofuji
- Kunitaro Sawamura: Genzaburo Yagyu
- Reisaburo Yamamoto: Yokichi
- Minoru Takase: Shigeju
- Ranko Hanai: Hagino

== Story ==
Genzaburo Yagyu, who is the adopted son-in-law of a dojo in Edo, received a seemingly worthless jar from his brother as a wedding gift not knowing that it contains the map of the whereabouts of a million ryō left by their ancestors. When the brother discovers the value of the jar, he tries to get the jar back from Genzaburo. Genzaburo becomes angry that his brother wants a gift back but is also suspicious. He threatens the messenger his brother sent with torture and the messenger reveals the truth about the jar. However, his wife Hagino had already sold it to a scrap shop. The pot ends up becoming a fishbowl in the hands of Yokichi, the son of Shichibei, who lives next door from the scrap shop.

Shichibei, a widower, goes every night to an archery booth that is run by Ofuji, where the bouncer is Tange Sazen. One night, Shichibei gets into a dispute with two other customers at the booth. He is attacked by them on his way home and dies. After some deliberation Ofuji decides to take Yokichi, who is now an orphan, to live with her. Meanwhile Genzaburo walks around Edo City in search of the jar and becomes attracted to Oku, who works in the archery booth. Genzaburo later discovers the treasure jar’s location but decides to keep it from his wife Hagino because he doesn't want to be deprived of the freedom to leave the dojo. However, Hagino suspects him of flirting with other women and prohibits him from leaving their dojo.

One day, Yokichi loses an item worth a large amount of money that belongs to a money changer. The money changer blames Ofuji and Tange. The next day, Tange, who has to pay back the money soon, goes out to challenge a dojo for money. The destination is Genzaburo's dojo, and without knowing it, Tange defeats his disciples one after another, and surprises Genzaburo after he finally comes out from hiding. They pretend not to know each other and make a plot where Tange allows Genzaburo to beat him in a duel in return for money. Genzaburo, knowing where the pot is, and now having authorization from his wife, decides not to take it because it would mean that he has to return home to his nagging wife.

== Development of Tange Sazen ==
Tange Sazen was originally portrayed as a villain when he first appeared in a newspaper-serialized novel in 1927. Having lost an arm and an eye in a vendetta, he was initially depicted as a nihilist and the antithesis of a loyal retainer. Director Daisuke Itō explored the transformation of Tange into a hero in Shinpan Ōoka seidan (1928), where Tange risks his life for a lord who eventually betrays him. For his movie, Yamanaka portrayed Tange as a lazy, petulant, yet warm-hearted swordsman who dotes on an orphan while squabbling with his female keeper. Yamanaka also showed fewer sword-fighting scenes in The Million Ryo Pot than virtually any other Tange Sazen film.

== Reception ==
Mark Schilling of The Japan Times said that the film was "universally considered the best of all the Tange Sazen lot."

== Media ==
Video of The Million Ryo Pot

=== Restoration ===
In 2020, Nikkatsu premiered a 4K digital restoration of the film at the 33rd Tokyo International Film Festival, including additional scenes (discovered at Kyōto's Toy Film Museum) that were missing from the previous surviving footage. The Japan Society held the North American premiere of the restored print in 2021.

=== Home releases ===
To commemorate Nikkatsu's 110th anniversary, a Japanese Blu-ray of the 4K restoration was released by the company.
