= Tomiya Oda =

Japanese artist

Tomiya Oda (小田富弥, Oda Tomiya; 5 July 1895 – 13 January 1990) was a Japanese Nihonga painter, woodblock printing artist, and magazine illustrator. Born in Okayama Prefecture, he was active during the Taishō and Shōwa eras. His illustrations helped popularize the rōnin character Tange Sazen.
