= Mother (1952 film) =

1952 Japanese film

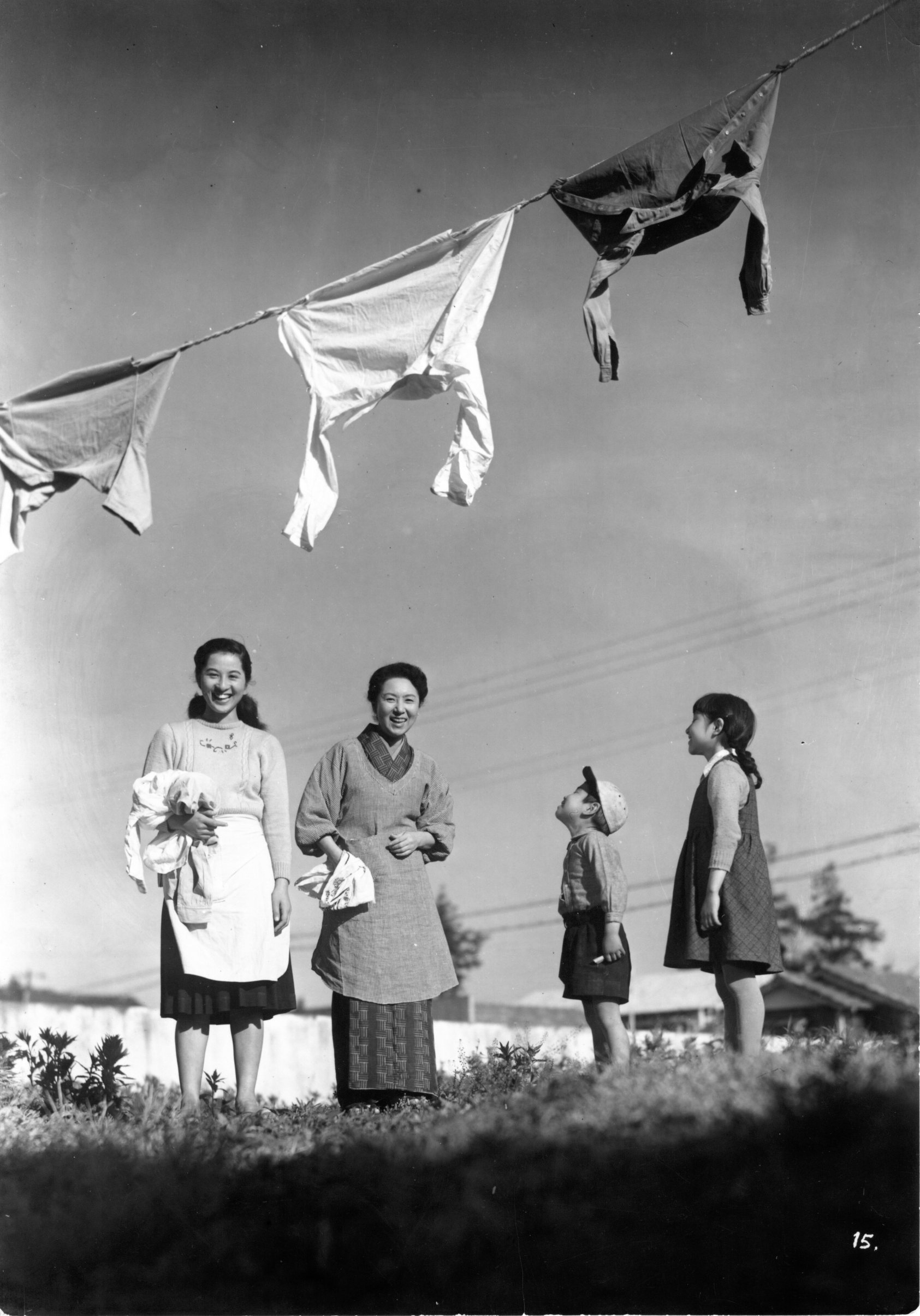
- Publicity image for the movie Mother
- Directed by: Mikio Naruse
- Written by: Yōko Mizuki
- Produced by: Ichiro Nagashima
- Starring: Kinuyo Tanaka; Kyōko Kagawa; Daisuke Katō
- Cinematography: Hiroshi Suzuki
- Edited by: Hidetoshi Kasama
- Music by: Ichirō Saitō
- Production company: Shintoho
- Distributed by: Toho
- Release date: 12 June 1952 (Japan)
- Running time: 98 minutes
- Country: Japan
- Language: Japanese

Mother (おかあさん, Okaasan) is a 1952 Japanese drama film directed by Mikio Naruse starring Kinuyo Tanaka in the title role. The screenplay by Yoko Mizuki is based on the prize-winning entry of a school essay-writing competition.

== Plot ==
Told from the viewpoint of Toshiko, the second child of three of the Fukuhara family, the film depicts her mother Masako's struggles during the post-war years. First Masako loses her son, who fell ill from working in a velvet cloth shop, then her husband Ryosaku, who ruined his health from overworking during the war. Ryosaku's friend Kimura joins the family's laundry shop, showing Masako how to handle the business, watched warily by Toshiko who objects the idea that her mother might marry him. To reduce the Fukuhara's financial hardships, and because they are childless after losing their son in the war, Ryosaku's brother and his wife adopt the younger daughter Chako. Kimura finally leaves the business to open his own laundry shop in Chiba, and Toshiko and young baker Shinjirō muse about getting married one day. Watching her mother play with her little cousin Tetsu, Toshiko wonders if she is happy, wishing that she will live a long life.

== Cast ==
- Kinuyo Tanaka as Masako Fukuhara
- Kyōko Kagawa as Toshiko Fukuhara
- Eiji Okada as Shinjirō
- Daisuke Katō as Kimura
- Masao Mishima as Ryosaku Fukuhara
- Chieko Nakabe as Noriko, Masako's sister
- Eiko Miyoshi as Ryosaku's mother
- Chieko Nakakita as Noriko

== Reception ==
Film historian Donald Richie called Mother one of Naruse's best films, but also an atypical one, because the protagonists escape the tragedy that usually hangs above Naruse's characters. Naruse biographer Catherine Russell noted a higher degree of sentimentality in this film compared to other works by the director of this period.

Mother was screened in Paris in 1954 and received the attention of critics like André Bazin and the writers of the Cahiers du cinéma.

== Legacy ==
Mother was screened at the Museum of Modern Art in 1985 and at the Harvard Film Archive in 2005 as part of their retrospectives on Mikio Naruse.

== Awards ==
- Blue Ribbon Awards for Best Director (Mikio Naruse) and Best Supporting Actor (Daisuke Katō)
- Mainichi Film Awards for Best Film Score (Ichirō Saitō), Best Supporting Actor (Daisuke Katō) and Best Supporting Actress (Chieko Nakakita)
