= Shinsengumi (1969 film) =

Shinsengumi: Assassins of Honor
- DVD cover
- Directed by: Tadashi Sawashima
- Written by: Kenro Matsûra
- Produced by: Hiroshi Inagaki; Toshiro Mifune; Yoshio Nishikawa
- Starring: Toshiro Mifune; Keiju Kobayashi; Kinya Kitaoji; Rentarō Mikuni; Yoko Tsukasa; Nakamura Kinnosuke; Kan'emon Nakamura
- Production company: Mifune Productions Co. Ltd. Toho; AnimEigo
- Distributed by: Toho
- Release date: December 5, 1969 (Japan)
- Running time: 122 minutes
- Country: Japan
- Language: Japanese

Shinsengumi (Japanese: 新撰組), a.k.a. Shinsengumi: Assassins of Honor or Band of Assassins, is a 1969 Japanese jidaigeki film directed by Tadashi Sawashima.

The true story of the end of the Shogunate, the tragedy of the Shinsengumi is one of the best loved stories of Japanese history and has been adapted many times on stage, screen, television, and anime. This film, starring Toshiro Mifune with an all-star cast, stands out as one of the definitive adaptations of this classic tale.

== Plot ==
Near the end of the nineteenth century, as the balance of power shifts from Shogunate towards the Emperor, Japan restlessly awaits the dawning of a new age. But not all are content.

The Shinsengumi, a small army of samurai, farmers and peasants, band together to do battle against the tide of history. Their leader, Isami Kondo, is a man who rises from farmer to fighter to head the fierce Shinsengumi brigade. Using a stern hand and a heart of gold, he rallies his men in defense of the tottering Shogunate. But bloodshed and treachery lurk around every corner.

== Cast ==
- Toshiro Mifune as Isami Kondo
- Keiju Kobayashi as Toshizo Hijikata
- Kinya Kitaoji as Soji Okita
- Rentarō Mikuni as Kamo Serizawa
- Yoko Tsukasa as Tsune
- Yumiko Nogawa
- Ichirō Nakatani
- Ryōhei Uchida as Niimi Nishiki
- Katsuo Nakamura
- Takahiro Tamura as Koshitaro Ito
- Nakamura Kinnosuke
- Kan'emon Nakamura
