= Humanity and Paper Balloons =

1937 Japanese film

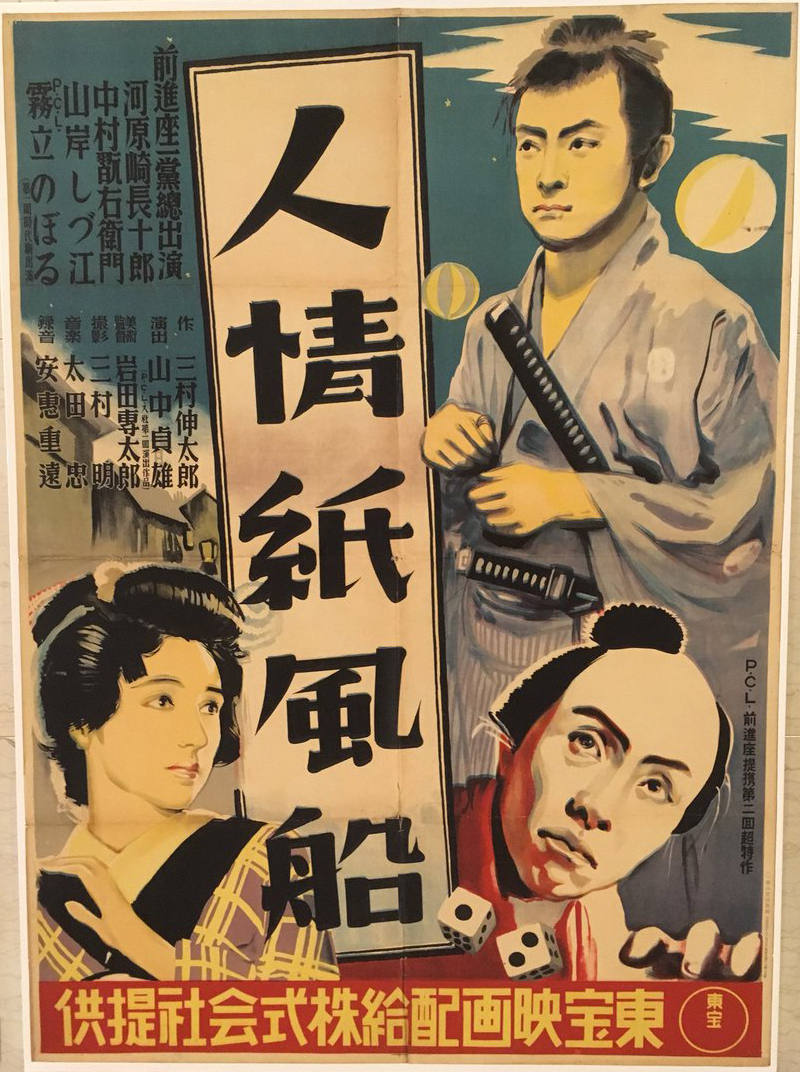
- Directed by: Sadao Yamanaka
- Written by: Shintarō Mimura
- Produced by: Takeyama Masanobu
- Starring: Chojuro Kawarasaki; Kan'emon Nakamura; Shizue Yamagishi
- Cinematography: Akira Mimura
- Edited by: Koichi Iwashita
- Music by: Tadashi Ota
- Production companies: P.C.L.; Zenshin-za Production
- Distributed by: Toho
- Release date: 25 August 1937 (Japan)
- Running time: 86 minutes
- Country: Japan
- Language: Japanese

Humanity and Paper Balloons (1937) by Sadao Yamanaka

Humanity and Paper Balloons (人情紙風船, Ninjō kami fūsen) is a 1937 Japanese jidaigeki tragedy film directed by Sadao Yamanaka. The film follows the lives of the members of a small tenement community who live under the shadow of the Tokugawa Shogunate. In order to cope with their impoverished circumstances, some turn to crime or suicide. It was Yamanaka's last film before his death.

In Japan it is regarded as one of the country's best films by critics. Kinema Junpo, the leading film magazine of Japan, ranked it the 23rd (tied) best Japanese film of all time in a 2009 poll of leading critics.

== Plot ==
The film is set in feudal Japan during the 18th century, an era known as the Edo period. It depicts the struggles and schemes of Matajuro Unno, a rōnin, or masterless samurai, and his neighbor Shinza, a hairdresser.

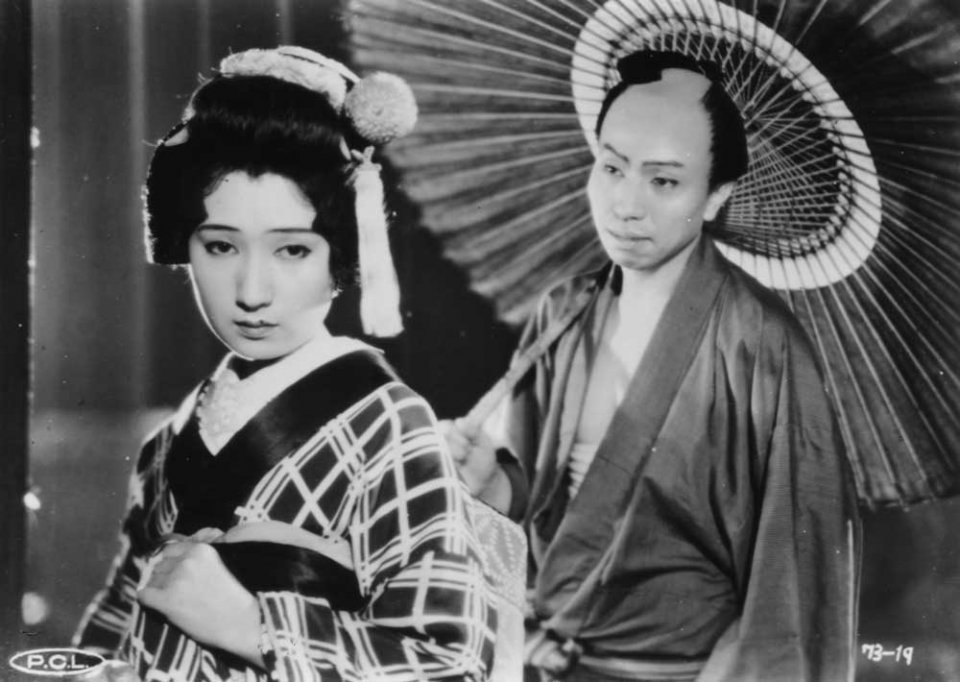
A scene from the film

The story begins in a slum where poor families perform menial jobs. Shinza, though a hairdresser by trade, actually makes his living by running illicit gambling rooms and pawning his belongings. Unno, who lives with his wife next door, is the son of Matabei Unno, a great samurai. Since his father's death, Unno has struggled to find work and hopes that Mouri, his father's former master, will hire him after reading a letter from his father. Mouri avoids Unno and finds excuses not to read his father's letter. Nevertheless, Unno seeks out Mouri every day and follows him wherever he goes. Mouri tries to get rid of Unno by sending a gang of men to intimidate him and telling his gate guards to keep him out.

Unno's wife waits for news that Mouri has hired Unno, but every day he tells her that "he'll meet Mr. Mouri tomorrow." With her husband out of work, she supports him by making kamifusen (Japanese paper balloons). Unno avoids telling her that Mouri keeps rejecting him and starts drinking to forget his humiliation. Despite his worsening situation, however, he keeps his dignity by not accepting gifts, loans, or favors.

Shinza's story runs in parallel with Unno's, albeit more dramatically. Shinza often gets beaten up by local pawn shop owner Shiroko Ya's gang for money he owes and for secretly organizing gambling games in their territory. Shinza fearlessly disregards their threats, angering the gang and their leader, Genshichi Yatagoro. Shinza loses all of his money when the gang chases him out of a secret gambling den, so he boldly goes to Shiroko's shop to pawn his hairdressing equipment. Upon reaching Shiroko's place unannounced, he finds Shiroko's daughter Okoma and his clerk Chushichi in the midst of a romantic moment. This discovery makes an impression, because Okoma's father and Mouri have already arranged for Okoma to marry the son of a rich old samurai against her will. Chushichi refuses to offer Shinza anything for his hairdressing tools, and Shinza makes up his mind up to avenge himself.

While this is happening, Unno's wife decides to visit her sister's family. Before leaving, she reminds Unno not to drink too much sake, since he had only recently recovered from an illness. He promises her that he will not drink.

When Okoma goes out with Chushichi to a festival, Shinza kidnaps her to punish Yatagoro. After learning that Okoma has not come home, Shiroko sends Yatagoro and his gang to pay Shinza quietly with a ransom to preserve the girl's reputation before the wedding. Shinza convinces his neighbor Unno to hide Okoma in his room when Yatagoro and his men search for her. When Yatagoro offers only a small ransom payment, Shinza refuses and tries to humiliate Yatagoro by telling him to shave his head and apologize for treating him so badly. Furious, Yatagoro leaves and sends one of his men to inform Shiroko that Shinza will not let Okoma go. Shinza's landlord, seeing an opportunity to make some money (because neither Shinza nor the other tenants pay the rent very often), goes to Shiroko and negotiates the release of the girl for ten times more money than Yatagoro had initially offered. Although Shinza insists that he does not really care about the ransom, the landlord forces him to accept his share of the money. When Okoma leaves her hiding place in Unno's room to board a palanquin sent by her father, everyone in the neighborhood feels disappointed to see that Unno had participated in a shameful scheme unworthy of a samurai. When Okoma comes home, Chushichi promises that they will run away together.

Shinza celebrates his victory over Yatagoro and Shiroko by treating all the men from his neighborhood to sake at the local bar. He pressures the hesitant Unno into joining the party. Unno's wife comes back from her sister's just in time to see her husband breaking his promise and heading to the bar. Though unwilling to drink at first, Unno feels so elated after learning that Okoma's kidnapping damaged Mouri's reputation that he happily drinks with Shinza. As Unno's wife approaches her home, she overhears the neighborhood women criticizing Unno for getting involved in the kidnapping. She realizes that her husband has broken not only his promise to her, but also his samurai code of honor, and the neighbors have lost all respect for him. Yatagoro and his men arrive at the bar and summon Shinza to leave the party and walk over to a nearby bridge. Shinza knows that he is no match for Yatagoro in a fight, but accepts his fate calmly and bravely.

Unno comes back home drunk. When confronted by his wife, he lies to her again, promising that he gave the letter to Mouri and that he must now wait for the turmoil of the kidnapping to subside. After he passes out on the floor, she finds his father's letter still in his pocket and finally knows for certain that Mouri has mistreated and insulted her husband all along. As a last resort to save their honor, she takes out a tantō (short sword) and kills her husband and then commits seppuku. The neighbors find their bodies the next day, but suicides happen in the slum so often that they see no meaning in their demise.

The film ends with a little boy running to tell the landlord about the deaths and dropping a kamifusen into a drainage gutter full of running water. Floating in the current, the paper balloon recedes into the distance.

== Cast ==
- Chojuro Kawarazaki as Unno Matajuro, a samurai
- Kan'emon Nakamura as Shinza, the hairdresser
- Shizue Yamagishi
- Noboru Kiritachi
- Tsuruzo Nakamura
- Choemon Bando
- Suzeko Suketakaya
- Emitaro Ichikawa
- Daisuke Katō

== Production and release ==
Humanity and Paper Balloons was written by Shintarō Mimura, based on his play. It was the final film by director Sadao Yamanaka before his untimely death at 28, of whose films only three are extant.

The film was released in Japan on 25 August 1937. It was later released in the United States with English subtitles in August 1982.

== Reception ==
At a time when films were coming under the purview of a nationalistic and militaristic government that was waging and justifying a war of expansion, Yamanaka's film debunking a national myth was not appreciated. Filmmakers were expected to use the past to glorify the actions of the present, and Yamanaka's samurai did not achieve this goal. The year of the film's release, Yamanaka was sent to the Chinese front, possibly as retribution for his antipatriotic sentiments, and died there in 1938.

In his book A hundred years of Japanese film, Donald Richie called Yamanaka "perhaps the finest" of the directors of the new jidaigeki, and Humanity and Paper Balloons his finest effort.

Jasper Sharp of Midnight Eye described the film as "a fascinating time capsule of a movie that not only reframes the feudal period in which it is set to present a harsh critique of the social and political conditions of the time it was made, but also demonstrates just how tight, coherent, and entertaining films from this period actually were." In 2012, Spanish film programmer Fran Gayo listed the film as one of the greatest films of all time.
