= Suwa Maru =

Japanese ocean liner

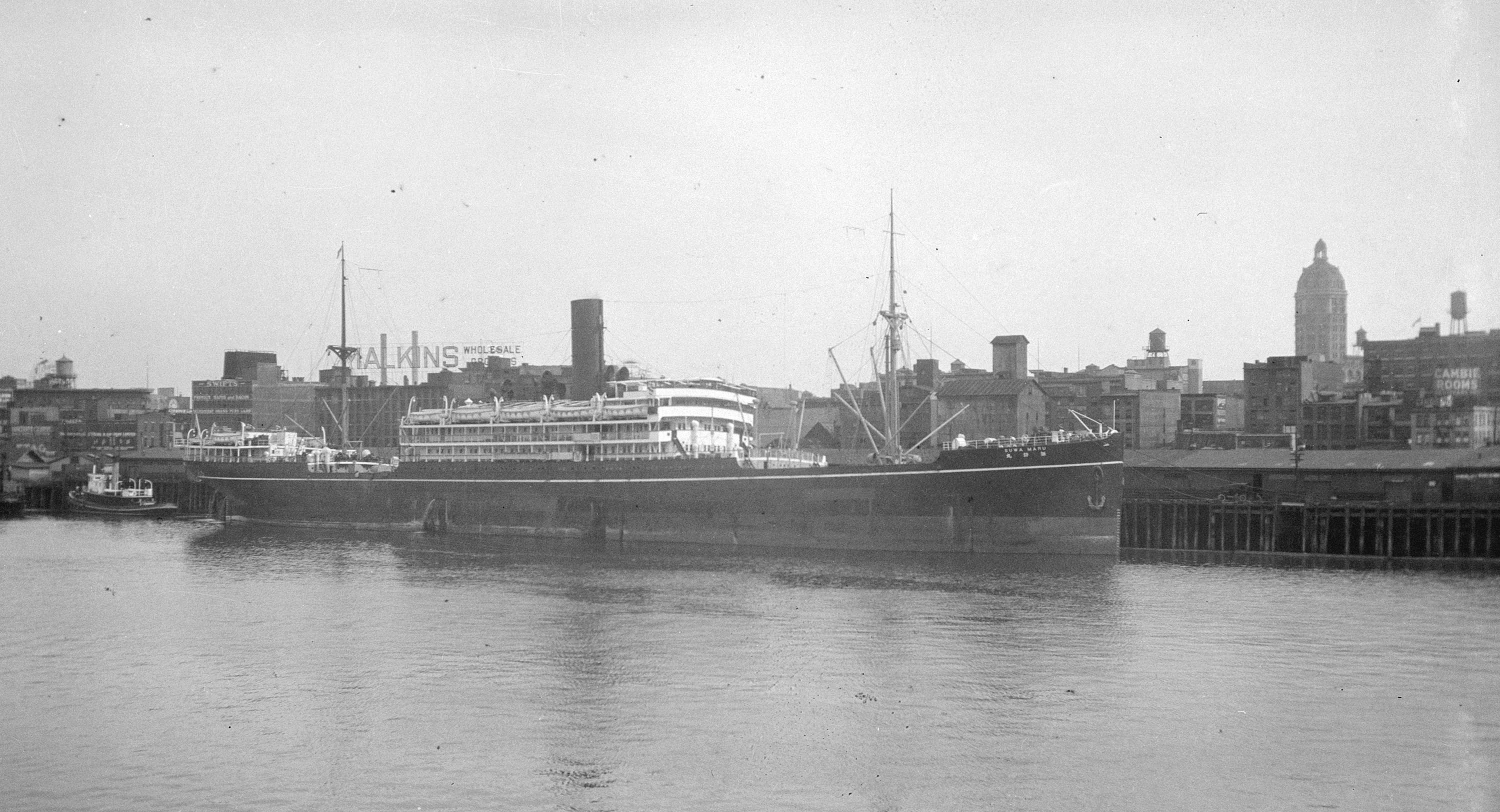
- Suwa Maru at Vancouver

History

Empire of Japan
- Name: Suwa Maru
- Operator: Nippon Yusen (NYK)
- Builder: Mitsubishi Shipbuilding Nagasaki, Japan
- Yard number: 236
- Laid down: 28 October 1912
- Launched: 29 March 1914
- Completed: 10 September 1914
- Out of service: 28 March 1943
- Identification: Call sign JSUD; IMO: 17308
- Fate: Grounded after torpedo strike at Wake island

General characteristics
- Class & type: Suwa Maru-class ocean liner
- Tonnage: 10,672 GRT
- Length: 153.9 m (504 ft 11 in) pp
- Beam: 19.4 m (63 ft 8 in)
- Draught: 11.5 m (37 ft 9 in)
- Propulsion: 2 x 3-cylinder triple expansion steam engines, twin shafts, dual screws 616 hp (459 kW)
- Speed: 16.4 knots (30.4 km/h; 18.9 mph)
- Capacity: (129 first class, 59 second class, 62 third class)

Suwa Maru (諏訪丸) was a Japanese passenger/cargo ship owned by Nippon Yusen Kaisha (NYK). The ship was launched in 1914 by Mitsubishi Shipbuilding & Engineering Co. at Nagasaki, Japan. The ship was named for the Suwa Jinja, a noted Shinto shrine located in Suwa, Nagano. In July 1941 the ship was taken into military service, and after being struck by torpedoes was beached on Wake Island in the Pacific in 1943. Since it was able to beach there was not much loss of life, though the ship was later struck again a few months later and the wreck visible for many years after the war.

== Background ==
Suwa Maru and her near sister, Fushimi Maru were slightly larger versions of the previous Katori Maru-class steamships, built specifically for NYK's European routes. Although somewhat smaller than comparable European passenger liners, these vessels were noted for a high standard of luxury. Their typical routing in the 1920s was from Yokohama, Kobe, Moji-ku, Shanghai, Hong Kong, Singapore, Malacca, Penang, Colombo, Aden, Suez, Port Said, Naples, Marseille, Gibraltar and London. The 10,672-ton steel-hulled vessel had a length of 153.9 metres (504 ft 11 in), and a beam of 19.4 metres (63 ft 8 in), with a single funnel, two masts, and double screws. Her two reciprocating steam engines could drive the ship at a maximum speed of 16.4 knots (30.4 km/h; 18.9 mph). Suwa Maru provided accommodation for 129 first class, 59 second class, and 62 third class passengers.

== Civilian career ==
Suwa Maru was completed in September 1914. On its maiden voyage from Yokohama to London in October–December 1914 it carried 110 men of the Shanghai British Contingent, returning to Britain to join the armed forces. Later assigned to NYK's northern Pacific route to Seattle, the ship suffered from a fire in her first class cabins in summer 1921, and underwent extensive repairs in Nagasaki. One of the passengers aboard Suwa Maru in 1918 was Commander Isoroku Yamamoto, the future Commander in Chief of the Imperial Japanese Navy. Yamamoto was travelling at the time to Harvard University for studies.

From the 1930s, she was placed in NYK's European service. Charlie Chaplin was a passenger on Suwa Maru from Singapore on his spontaneous trip to visit Japan in 1932.

Suwa Maru was briefly requisitioned by the Imperial Japanese Army on 29 August 1937 to transport troops and materials to China for the Second Sino-Japanese War, but was returned to NYK on 9 January 1938. She resumed civilian operations until requisitioned by the Imperial Japanese Army again on 8 July 1941.

== Military career ==
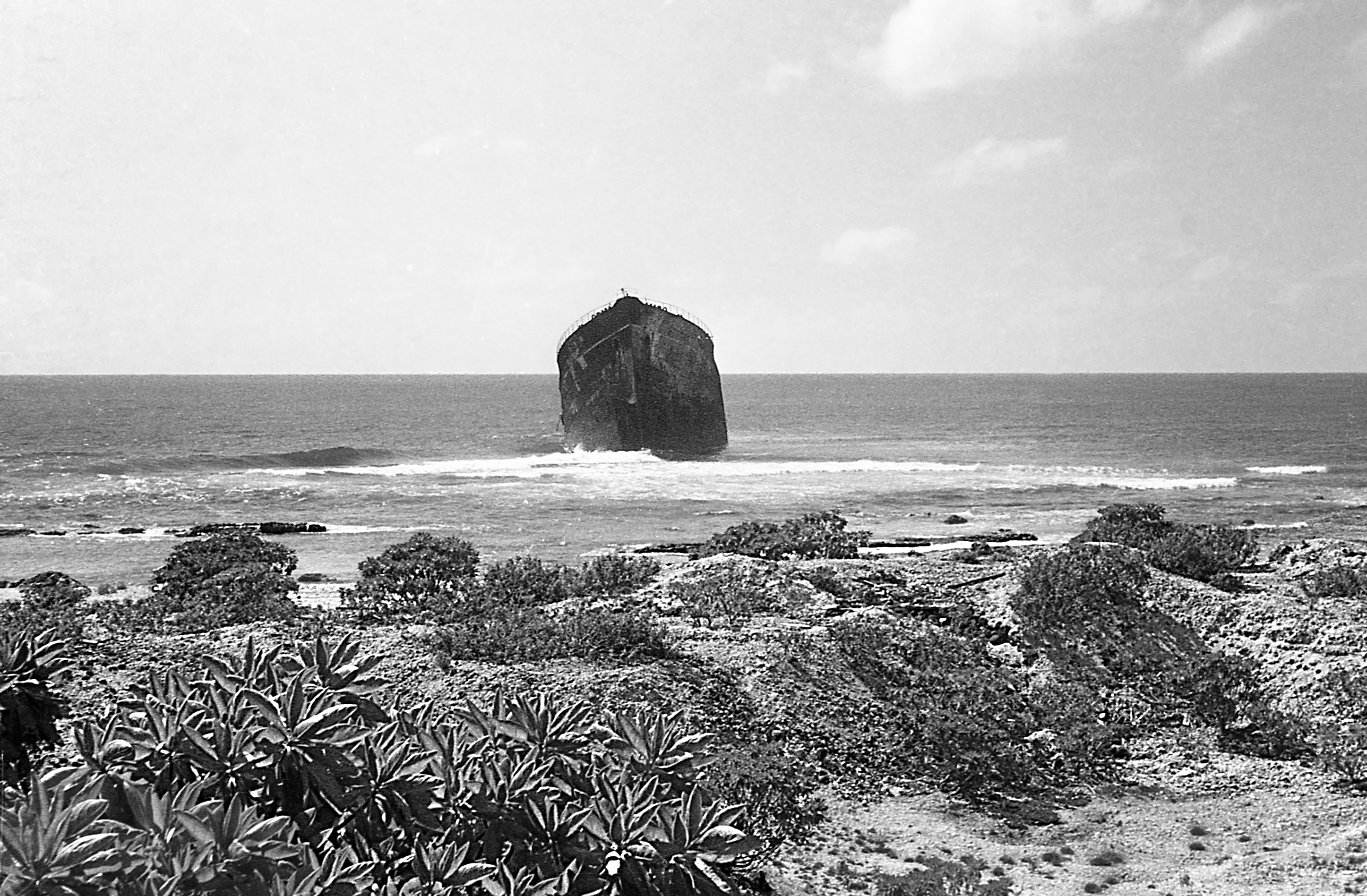
The wreck of Suwa Maru on Wake Island in 1954

From July 1941 to February 1942, Suwa Maru was employed as a troop transport used primarily to shuttle troops and supplies from Manchukuo and various ports in Japan and Taiwan to points along the China coast and to French Indochina. On 18 February 1942, she was one of 56 transports assigned to the Japanese force for the Japanese invasion of Java. On the successful completion of her mission, she returned to Moji on 11 April. On 18 April, she was released back to NYK but was then requisitioned by the Imperial Japanese Navy on 8 August and attached to Kure Naval District. She spent the remainder of the year shuttling men and material between Japan and Truk, the Marshall Islands, Kavieng on New Ireland, and Rabaul.

After repairs during the month of January 1943, Suwa Maru departed Yokosuka on 28 January with 511 passengers to be offloaded at six different island locations. She arrived safely at Saipan on 7 February, Ponape on 18 February, Jaluit on 23 February and Emiedj on 24 February, Wotje on 1 March and Kwajalein on 3 March. She departed Kwajalein on 25 March with 1091 passengers for Wake Island. On 28 March 1943 Suwa Maru was sighted by USS Tunny at dawn approximately 16 kilometers (9.9 mi) from Wake. The submarine fired two torpedoes, one of which struck the No.4 and No.5 holds, blowing the stern off the ship, To prevent sinking, Suwa Maru was beached on a nearby reef at approximately 19°13′N 166°34′E, with 14 passengers killed. The wreck was abandoned, but was attacked again on 5 April by USS Finback. She was removed from the navy list on 1 July 1943.

== See also ==
- List of ocean liners
