= USS Finback (SS-230) =

Submarine of the United States

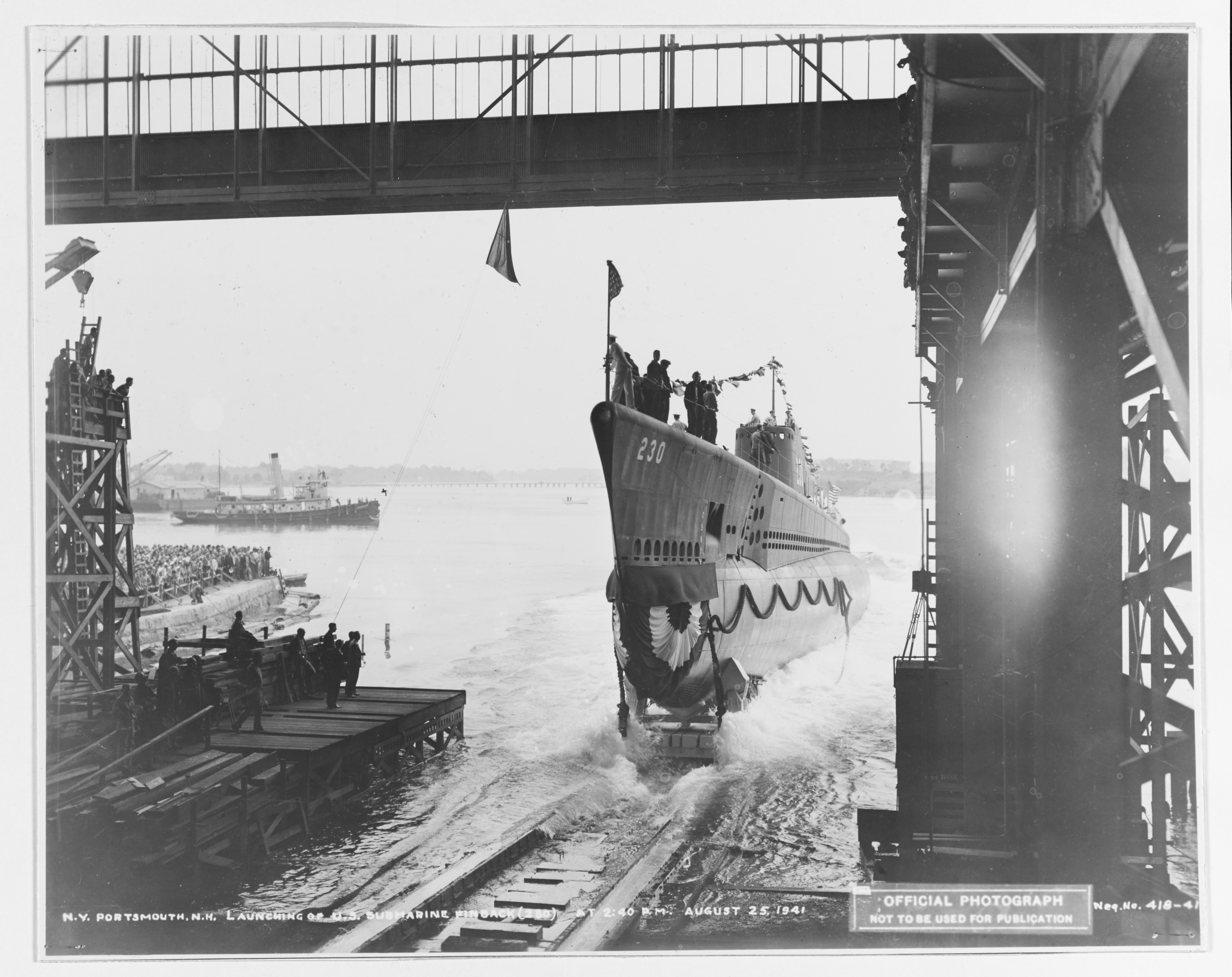
- Launch of USS Finback

History

United States
- Builder: Portsmouth Naval Shipyard, Kittery, Maine
- Laid down: 5 February 1941
- Launched: 25 August 1941
- Sponsored by: Mrs. A. E Watson
- Commissioned: 31 January 1942
- Decommissioned: 21 April 1950
- Stricken: 1 September 1958
- Honors and awards: 13 × battle stars
- Fate: Sold for scrap, 15 July 1959

General characteristics
- Class & type: Gato-class diesel-electric submarine
- Displacement: 1,525 long tons (1,549 t) surfaced; 2,424 long tons (2,463 t) submerged
- Length: 311 ft 9 in (95.02 m)
- Beam: 27 ft 3 in (8.31 m)
- Draft: 17 ft (5.2 m) maximum
- Propulsion: 4 × Fairbanks-Morse Model 38D8-1/8 9-cylinder opposed-piston diesel engines driving electrical generators; 2 × 126-cell Sargo batteries; 4 × high-speed Elliott electric motors with reduction gears; 2 × propellers; 5,400 shp (4.0 MW) surfaced; 2,740 shp (2.04 MW) submerged
- Speed: 21 knots (39 km/h) surfaced; 9 kn (17 km/h) submerged
- Range: 11,000 nmi (20,000 km) surfaced at 10 kn (19 km/h)
- Endurance: 48 hours at 2 kn (4 km/h) submerged; 75 days on patrol
- Test depth: 300 ft (90 m)
- Complement: 6 officers, 54 enlisted
- Armament: 10 × 21-inch (533 mm) torpedo tubes; 6 forward, 4 aft; 24 torpedoes; 1 × 3-inch (76 mm) / 50 caliber deck gun; Bofors 40 mm and Oerlikon 20 mm cannon

USS Finback (SS-230), a Gato-class submarine, was the first ship of the United States Navy to be named for the finback. Nine of Finback's 12 World War II patrols in the Pacific were designated as "successful"; she received 13 battle stars for her service and is credited with having sunk nearly 70,000 tons of enemy shipping.

== Construction and commissioning ==
Finback was laid down on 5 February 1941 at the Portsmouth Navy Yard in Kittery, Maine. She was launched on 25 August 1941, sponsored by Mrs. Genevieve G. Watson, wife of Rear Admiral Adolphus E Watson, commandant of the 4th Naval District and the Philadelphia Navy Yard in Philadelphia, Pennsylvania. She was commissioned on 31 January 1942.

== 1942 ==
=== First and second patrols ===
Finback reached Pearl Harbor from New London on 29 May 1942, and two days later, with the Japanese fleet on the move, was ordered out to patrol during the Battle of Midway. She returned to Pearl Harbor on 9 June to prepare for her first full war patrol. She cleared harbor, bound for the Aleutian Islands, on 25 June. Finback first contacted the enemy on 5 July, when she attacked two destroyers and received a heavy return depth charge attack. Crewmate (electrician's mate, 2nd class) Robert D. White recalls the event, "They [a Japanese ship] fired depth charges at us for nearly 24 hours. We only had about that much air left, we just kept going deeper, trying to outlast them. Just as 'Skip' started talking about surrendering for lack of oxygen, the charges stopped...Fresh air never felt so good as when we made it to the surface and opened the hatch." Two special missions highlighted this first war patrol, a reconnaissance of Vega Bay, Kiska, on 11 July, and a surveying operation at Tanaga Bay, Tanaga, on 11 August. The submarine ended her patrol at Dutch Harbor on 12 August and returned to Pearl Harbor on 23 August to refit.

Departing Pearl Harbor on 23 September 1942, Finback made her second war patrol off Taiwan. On 14 October, she sighted a convoy of four merchantmen, guarded by a patrol vessel. The submarine launched two torpedoes at each of the two largest targets, sinking one, the ex-French merchantman Ville De Verdun, rechristened the Teison Maru (7007 tons), returning empty to Japan, and went deep for the inevitable depth charging. When she surfaced, she found two destroyers in the area, preventing further attacks.

With her tubes reloaded, Finback headed for the China coast. Four days later, on 18 October, she inflicted heavy damage on a large freighter, and on 20 October, made contact with three ships, en route to Yokohama, Japan, from Saigon. She sank two - the passenger-cargo ship Africa Maru (9476 tons), carrying a cargo of rice and corn, 112 crewmen and 38 passengers including survivors of cargo ship Teibo Maru (4,472 tons), which had been torpedoed and sunk on 25 September 1942 by USS Sargo, and the cargo ship Yamafuji Maru (5359 tons). The submarine completed her first patrol with a surface gunfire engagement on 3 November, sinking an ocean-going sampan. Finback returned to Pearl Harbor on 20 November.

== 1943 ==
=== Third and fourth patrols ===
During her third war patrol, between 16 December 1942 and 6 February 1943, Finback served for some time as escort for a carrier task force, forbidden to reveal herself by making attacks during that part of the patrol. Later, she engaged the Japanese coaster Yachiyo Maru (271 tons) in a surface gun duel on 17 January, leaving the enemy craft abandoned and sinking.

After refitting at Midway, Finback made her fourth war patrol between 27 February and 13 April, scouting shipping lanes between Rabaul and the Japanese home islands. On 21 March, she damaged the troop transport Sanuki Maru (7158 tons) during an attack in which one of the two torpedoes that hit the ship failed to explode, and from 24 to 26 March, made a difficult chase of a convoy. When in position to attack, she fired three torpedoes at each of two ships and was immediately fired upon, then forced deep by an efficient depth-charge attack. Almost out of fuel, Finback was forced to break off the contact and set course for Wake Island and Midway.

On 5 April, passing a reef south of Japanese-held Wake, Finback sighted the troop transport Suwa Maru, beached and well down by the stern. After manoeuvring, Finback was able to elude a patrol boat and a searching airplane before torpedoing and sinking the 10,672-ton ship previously damaged by two of Finback's sister submarines.

=== Fifth and sixth patrols ===
Finback refitted at Pearl Harbor from 13 April to 12 May 1943 for her fifth war patrol. Through most of this patrol, she patrolled off Taiwan, and along the shipping lanes from the Japanese home islands to the Marshalls. On 27 May, she sank IJA cargo ship Kochi Maru (2910 tons), and on 8 June, the auxiliary minelayer Kahoku Maru (3277 tons). Finback sank another merchant vessel four days later.

After refitting at Fremantle, Western Australia, from 26 June to 18 July, the boat sailed for her sixth war patrol along the Java coast. Her first contact was made 30 July, and she sank the IJA cargo ship Ryuzan Maru (4719 GRT) and another cargo ship on 3 August. On 11 August, Finback damaged the auxiliary minelayer Tatsumiya Maru (6343 tons). She encountered two small minelayers, a tug, and an interisland steamer on 19 August, and engaged all but the tug with surface gunfire, damaging the auxiliary submarine chaser and sinking the former Dutch patrol vessel Kawi, renamed Cha 109 (75 tons). Her limited supply of ammunition forced her to break off the action.

== 1944 ==
=== Seventh and eighth patrols ===
After a major overhaul at Pearl Harbor between 12 September and 15 December 1943, Finback sailed for the South China Sea on her seventh war patrol, characterized by heavy weather, few contacts, and continuous sightings of patrol planes. She sank the tanker Isshin Maru (10044 tons) in a surface attack on New Year's Day 1944, after the ship was unable to keep up with her convoy due to a rudder malfunction. On 30 January, Finback sank a fishing trawler by surface gunfire and damaged another in a similar action the following day.

The submarine refitted at Pearl Harbor once more between 11 February and 6 March 1944, then sailed for her eighth war patrol, off Truk in the Caroline Islands. Prevented from launching attacks through most of the eighth patrol because of her assignment as lifeguard for carrier air strikes on targets in the Carolines, Finback contacted a six-ship convoy on 12 April, noting three escorts. She attacked four of the ships before a counterattack sent her deep. On 16 April, while making a reconnaissance of Oroluk Atoll, she fired on a partially submerged steamer and a lookout tower on the atoll. Three days later, she sank one of a group of sampans, then sailed for refit at Pearl Harbor from 1 May to 30 May.

=== Ninth, tenth, and eleventh patrols ===
During her ninth war patrol, off the Palaus and west of the Marianas, Finback again served lifeguard duty as her primary mission during plane strikes covering the opening of the Marianas operation.

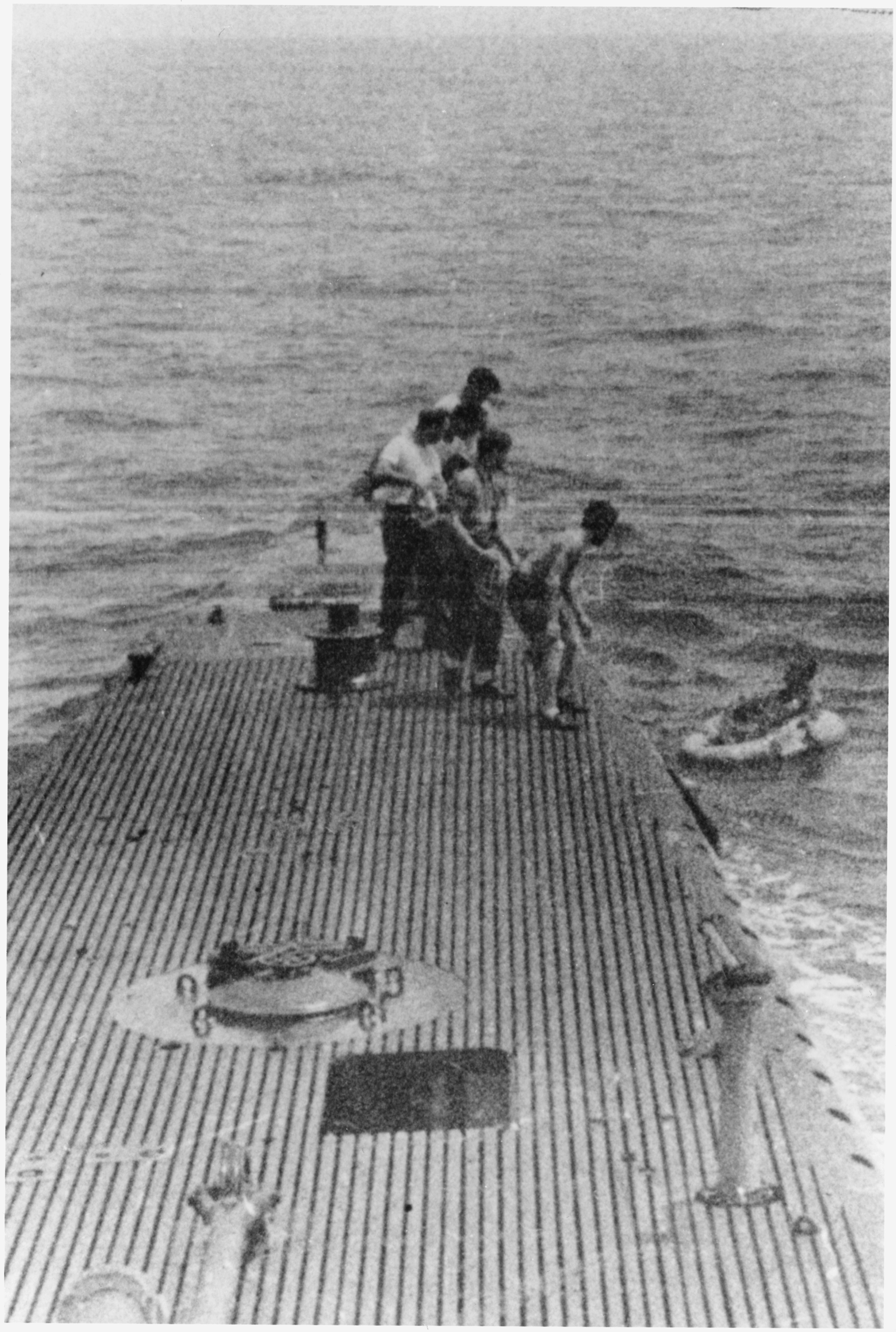
2 September 1944 USS Finback rescuing George H. W. Bush

She returned to Majuro on 21 July for refit, then sailed on 16 August on her 10th war patrol under the command of Lieutenant Commander Robert Russell Williams, Jr., and was assigned to lifeguard duty in the Bonins. Guided by friendly aircraft, she rescued a total of five naval aviators, one very close inshore off Chichi Jima. Watchman Torpedoman First Class Donnet Kohler pulled out a tall, lanky young pilot who would later become the 41st President of the United States, George H. W. Bush. Pilot Beckman was rescued by holding on to the Finback's periscope until the partially submerged vessel was five miles from Haha Jima and out of shelling range of Japanese cannons. Bush remained on the submarine for 30 days and integrated himself as part of the submarine's crew as she finished her patrol.

On 10 – 11 September, she tracked a convoy, and although twice her attacks were broken off by an alert escort, she sank Hassho Maru (536 tons) and Hakuun Maru No. 2 (866 tons).

Finback put into Pearl Harbor for refit. On her 11th war patrol, she was again detailed to lifeguard duty in the Bonins. She sank a troop transport, Jusan Maru (2111 tons), on 16 December and returned to Midway on 24 December.

== 1945 ==
=== Twelfth patrol ===
The submarine's 12th war patrol, made between 20 January and 25 March 1945 in the East China Sea, was frustrated by a lack of targets. According to James Southworth and Larry Lutwitzi (quartermasters), though, the Finback had a series of close calls involving a Japanese minefield, then an enemy submarine, and then a depth charging near a Japanese naval base near Shanghai. Finback limped back to Pearl Harbor for repairs and an overhaul. Still at Pearl Harbor at the close of the war, she sailed for New London 29 August 1945.

== After the war ==
Homeported at New London for the remaining five years of her active career, Finback was engaged in training student submariners. Twice, in 1947 and in 1948, she sailed to the Caribbean to take part in Second Fleet exercises. She was decommissioned and placed in reserve at New London on 21 April 1950.

Finback was stricken on 1 September 1958, and sold for scrap on 15 July 1959.

All but the third, ninth, and 12th of Finback's 12 war patrols were designated "successful". She received 13 battle stars for World War II service and is credited with having sunk 69,383 tons of enemy shipping.
