= Katori Maru =

Katori Maru is the name of the following ships:

- Katori Maru (1913), sunk by HNLMS K XIV on 23 December 1941
- Katori Maru (1938), sunk by USS Growler (SS-215) on 29 June 1944

== See also ==
- Katori (disambiguation)
