= Kōchiyama Sōshun (film) =

1936 Japanese film

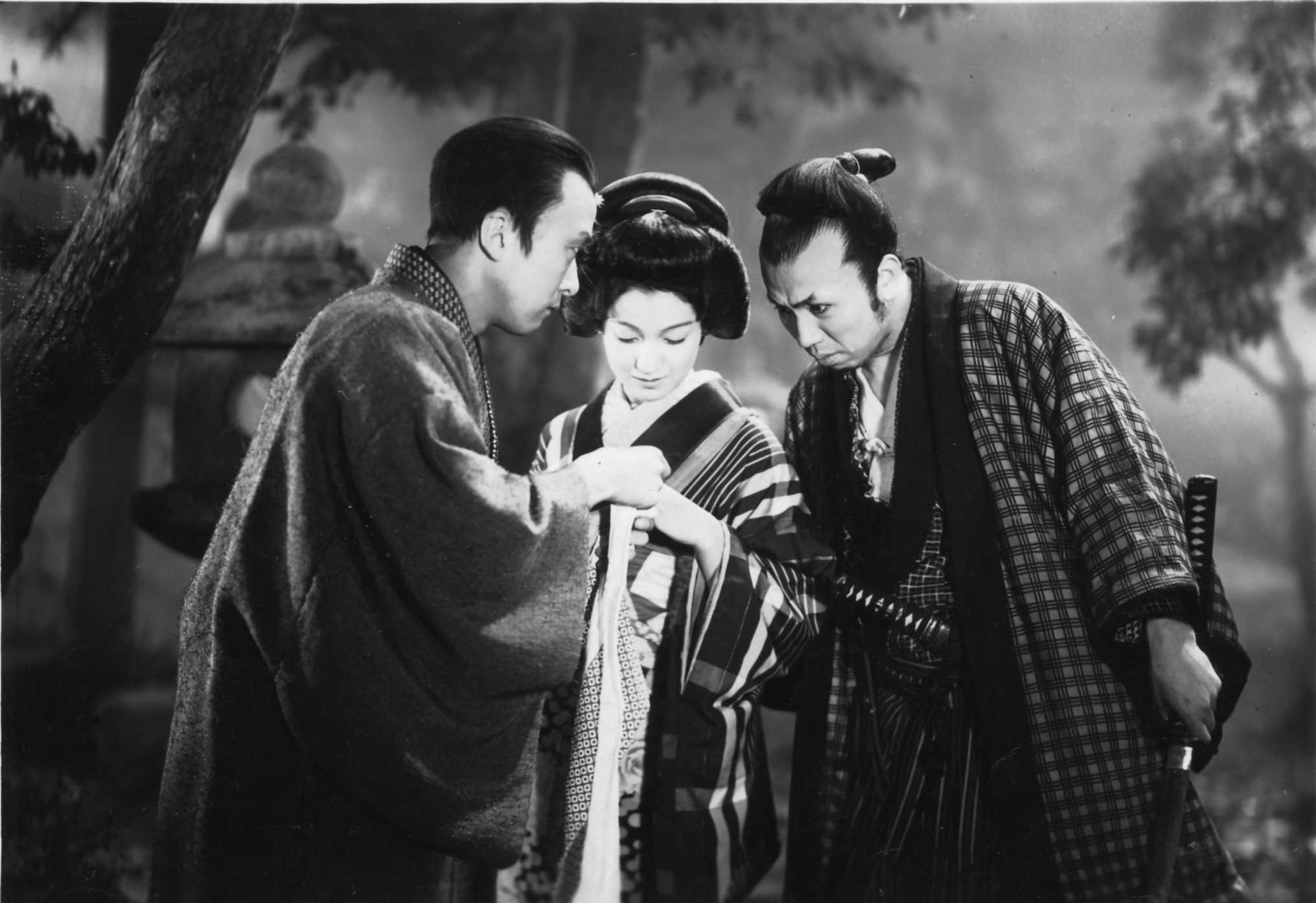
- Scene from Kōchiyama Sōshun
- Directed by: Sadao Yamanaka
- Written by: Shintarō Mimura (screenplay); Sadao Yamanaka (story)
- Produced by: Nikkatsu; Taiqin Sound Film Company
- Starring: Kan'emon Nakamura
- Cinematography: Harumi Machii
- Music by: Gorō Nishi
- Distributed by: Nikkatsu
- Release date: 30 April 1936 (Japan)
- Running time: 87 minutes
- Country: Japan
- Language: Japanese

Kōchiyama Sōshun (河内山宗俊), also known in English as Priest of Darkness, is a 1936 Japanese jidaigeki film directed by Sadao Yamanaka. It is one of three surviving films by the director.

== Cast ==
- Chojuro Kawarasaki – Kōchiyama Sōshun
- Kan'emon Nakamura – Kaneko
- Shizue Yamagishi – Oshizu
- Setsuko Hara – Onami
- Daisuke Katō (credited as Enji Ichikawa) – Kenta

== Production ==
The original idea for Kōchiyama Sōshun came from a Kabuki play by Kawatake Mokuami, known as Kochiyama to naozamurai. In the play, the two title characters are petty criminals from the Ueno district of Edo (now Tokyo). Yamanaka changed some of the characters from the play to be more good-natured, in keeping with his film aesthetic. He also modernized the Kabuki play by casting actors from the Zenshin-za Group, which aimed to bring modern acting techniques to traditional Kabuki plays.
