= Under the Flag of the Rising Sun =

1971 film by Kinji Fukasaku

- Theatrical release poster
- Directed by: Kinji Fukasaku
- Screenplay by: Kaneto Shindō; Norio Osada; Kinji Fukasaku
- Story by: Shoji Yuki
- Produced by: Seiji Matsumaru; Shohei Tokisane
- Starring: Sachiko Hidari; Tetsuro Tamba; Kanemon Nakamura
- Cinematography: Hiroshi Segawa
- Music by: Hikaru Hayashi
- Production companies: Shinsei Eiga-sha; Toho
- Distributed by: Toho
- Release date: 12 March 1972 (Japan)
- Running time: 95 minutes
- Country: Japan

Under the Flag of the Rising Sun (Japanese: 軍旗はためく下に, Hepburn: Gunki Hatameku Moto ni) is a 1972 Japanese film directed by Kinji Fukasaku. It is based on two of the stories in Yūki Shōji's Naoki Prize-winning short story collection of the same name. The film was selected as the Japanese entry for the Best Foreign Language Film at the 45th Academy Awards, but was not accepted as a nominee.

== Plot ==
In 1946, Sakie Togashi receives a death notice for her husband Sgt. Katsuo Togashi's death during World War II, but it does not include the specific date of death and the cause of death has been changed from "combat-related" to "deceased" so she suspects that something is being hidden. She despairs, but must remain alive to raise their daughter Tomoko alone. In 1952, the Military Family Survivor Benefits Law is enacted, but the government refuses her benefits, claiming that Katsuo Togashi was a deserter in New Guinea in August 1945. All of the military records had been burned at the end of the war, so the Ministry of Welfare sent inquiries to the other men in Katsuo's unit but received no response from four men. Sakie tracks down these four men and asks them to reveal the truth about Katsuo's actions.

Private First Class Tsugio Terajima says that he was never sent an inquiry and tells Sakie how Sgt. Togashi saved his life in 1943 in the fight against Americans and Australians in New Guinea by defying orders and telling the men not to proceed into an obvious trap, then again in 1944 by telling him to flee a sick camp when he learns of a plan to kill the sick. Terajima now lives in a Korean shanty town and is unwilling to visit Tokyo to testify. Corporal Tomotaka Akiba, now an actor playing a comedic caricature of a Japanese holdout on stage, tells Sakie that he remembers a sergeant being shot for stealing potatoes from the military supply, but is not certain if it was Sgt. Togashi. Military Police Sergeant Nobuyuki Ochi, now blind from drinking postwar black market booze known as "bomb", tells Sakie that he remembers a sergeant killing soldiers to eat and sell their meat, but is not certain if it was Sgt. Togashi.

2nd Lieutenant Tadahiko Ohashi, now a high school literature teacher, tells Sakie that information was disclosed after the war that Major Senda, Division Staff Officer, had ordered the killing of a captured Australian pilot by 2nd Lieutenant Goto, but Goto merely repeatedly injures the prisoner until an M. P. is ordered to shoot the prisoner. Goto, left traumatized by the incident, had become increasingly hostile and had forced his subordinates into hard labor and had hoarded their rations, so Sgt. Togashi and others had killed him. After the war, one of them had confessed to the killing so Senda had them all killed by firing squad without a court-martial to cover up his botched execution of the Australian. Sakie confronts Major Takeo Senda, who insists that he followed proper procedure. He tells her that only the three men involved in the murder had been executed but that Terajima had been spared.

Sakie returns to Terajima, who admits that his previous story was a lie but explains that Goto had refused to believe that the war was over and had ordered a new offensive. He had drawn his sword on the famished Terajima, causing Togashi and two other men to kill him to save Terajima. The others then left for HQ while Terajima, unable to walk, cooked and ate Goto to survive. He later confessed the murder but was spared while Togashi and the two others were executed by Military Police Sergeant Ochi. Terajima and Sakie discover that Ochi has been struck and killed by a vehicle while crossing on a red light while intoxicated. Terajima tells her that Togashi had demanded white rice for his last meal and that he had faced Japan to scream angrily at the Emperor before his death. Sakie thinks to herself that the Emperor started the war without asking the permission of the Japanese people yet they were left paying for it.

== Cast ==
Actor	Role
Tetsuro Tamba	Katsuo Togashi
Sachiko Hidari	Sakie
Yumiko Fujita	Tomoko
Noboru Mitani	Terajima
Paul Maki	Paul
Takeshi Seki	Akiba
Shonosuke Ichikawa	Ochi
Sanae Nakahara	Ochi's wife
Taketoshi Naito	Ohashi
Kanemon Nakamura	Senda
Shinjirō Ehara	Goto
Makoto Terada	Kobari
Isao Natsuyagi	Sakai
Koichi Yamamoto	Manager

== Production ==
Kinji Fukasaku used the money he received from 20th Century Fox for co-directing the Japanese portion of Tora! Tora! Tora! to buy the rights to adapt Yūki Shōji's 1970 short story collection Under the Flag of the Rising Sun.

== Release ==
Under the Flag of the Rising Sun received a roadshow theatrical release in Japan starting on 12 March 1972 where it was distributed by Toho. It received a general release on 13 May 1972.

The film was released in the United States with English subtitles by Toho International on 17 August 1982.

== Reception ==
According to Mark Schilling, Under the Flag of the Rising Sun received critical praise both in Japan and abroad for its "Rashomon-like story line and brutal realism". Tom Mes of Midnight Eye called it a powerful anti-war drama and one of Fukasaku's "most uncompromising films" for directly laying bare the numerous negative side effects of Japan's economic miracle. Praising Under the Flag of the Rising Sun as the best Fukasaku film he has seen, Glenn Erickson of DVD Talk wrote that by cutting right to the heart of the issue and "saying that looking for honor and righteousness in war deeds is an exercise in futility" it comes off as an alternate history of Japan and its 'Official Success Story'. He also praised Fukasaku's "half-documentary feel", with characters introduced via freeze frames and title cards and flashbacks being mostly in black and white, as much more successful than in the director's later yakuza films.

== See also ==
- List of submissions to the 45th Academy Awards for Best Foreign Language Film
- List of Japanese films of 1972
- List of Japanese submissions for the Academy Award for Best Foreign Language Film

== Sources ==
- Galbraith IV, Stuart (2008). The Toho Studios Story: A History and Complete Filmography. Scarecrow Press. ISBN 978-1461673743.
- Canby, Vincent (August 17, 1982). "FILM: JAPANESE WIDOW (film review)". The New York Times.
- "UNDER THE FLAG OF THE RISING SUN (credits)". Academy of Motion Picture Arts and Sciences.
- Wilson, Jeff (June 8, 2005). "Under the Flag of the Rising Sun (1972) (Region 1 DVD review)". www.digitallyobsessed.com.
- "軍旗はためく下に (Gunki hatameku moto ni)" (in Japanese). Japanese Movie Database.
