= Japanese ship Katori =

At least three warships of Japan have borne the name Katori:

- Japanese battleship Katori, a Katori-class battleship of the Imperial Japanese Navy launched in 1905 and decommissioned in 1923
- Japanese cruiser Katori, a Katori-class cruiser of the Imperial Japanese Navy launched in 1939 and sunk in 1944
- JDS Katori (TV-3501), a training vessel of the Japan Maritime Self-Defense Force launched in 1968 and decommissioned in 1998
