= Katora =

Katora is a village in near Sanawad in Khargone district of Madhya Pradesh state of India. According to the 2011 census Katora village has a population of 3468 of which 1780 were males and 1688 females.
