= Katora, Punjab =

Village in Punjab, India

Katora village is located in Zira tehsil in Firozpur district in Punjab.This village is 48 km away from the district headquarter Firozpur. Katora village is also a Gram Panchayat.

Literacy rate of this village is 59.33%.

Total population of this village is 1,040. Male population is 544 while female population is 496.

The Postal Index Number of this village is 142028.
