= Katori Maru (1913) =

Japanese ocean liner

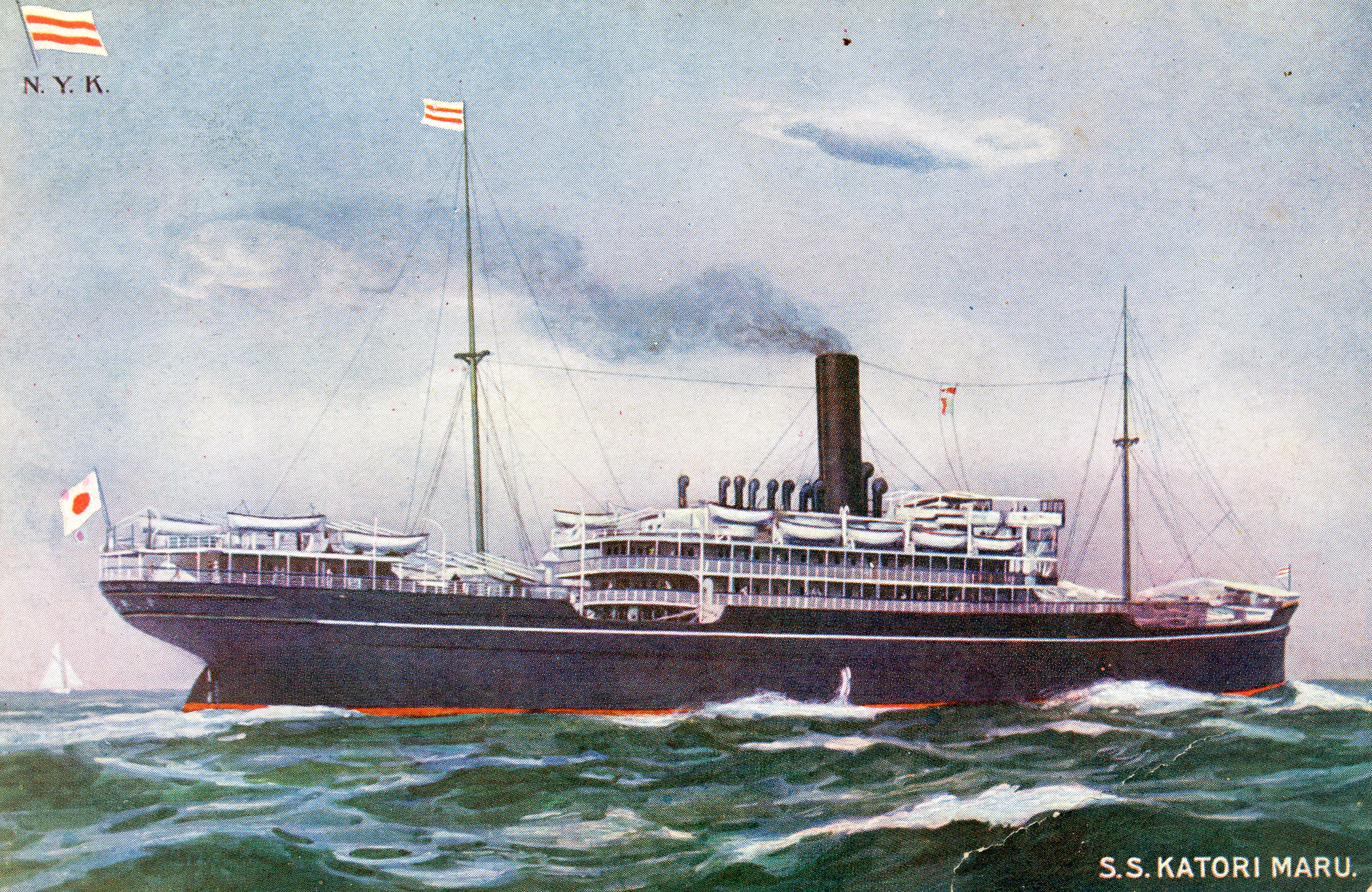
- Postcard of Katori Maru

History

Japan
- Name: Katori Maru
- Namesake: Katori
- Owner: Nippon Yusen KK
- Port of registry: Tokyo
- Builder: Mitsubishi, Nagasaki
- Yard number: 230
- Launched: 30 March 1913
- Completed: September 1913
- Identification: code letters MHWQ (until 1933); call sign JKR (by 1918); call sign JKRD (by 1934)
- Fate: Sunk by torpedo, 23 December 1941

General characteristics
- Type: ocean liner
- Tonnage: 9,849 GRT, 6,128 NRT
- Length: 499.8 ft (152.3 m)
- Beam: 59.9 ft (18.3 m)
- Draught: 28 ft 6 in (8.69 m)
- Depth: 33.9 ft (10.3 m)
- Decks: 2
- Propulsion: 2 × triple-expansion steam engines; 1 × low-pressure steam turbine; 3 × screws
- Speed: 14.5 knots (26.9 km/h)

Katori Maru was a steam ocean liner of the Empire of Japan. She was built in Nagasaki in 1912–13. In the Second World War the Imperial Japanese Navy requisitioned her as a troop ship. In 1941 a Royal Netherlands Navy submarine sank her off the coast of Sarawak.

Her wreck was found in 2003. It had become an artificial reef and became a scuba diving destination. In 2013 divers removed historic artifacts from the wreck, and in 2016 salvage vessels destroyed most of the wreck for its scrap metal. Today little of the wreck remains except the bow.

Several Japanese ships have been called Katori or Katori Maru, and the Japanese Navy had more than one transport ship of this name in the Second World War.

In 1925 Chinese Muslims used the ship to travel to Singapore on their way to Mecca for the Hajj.

== Building ==
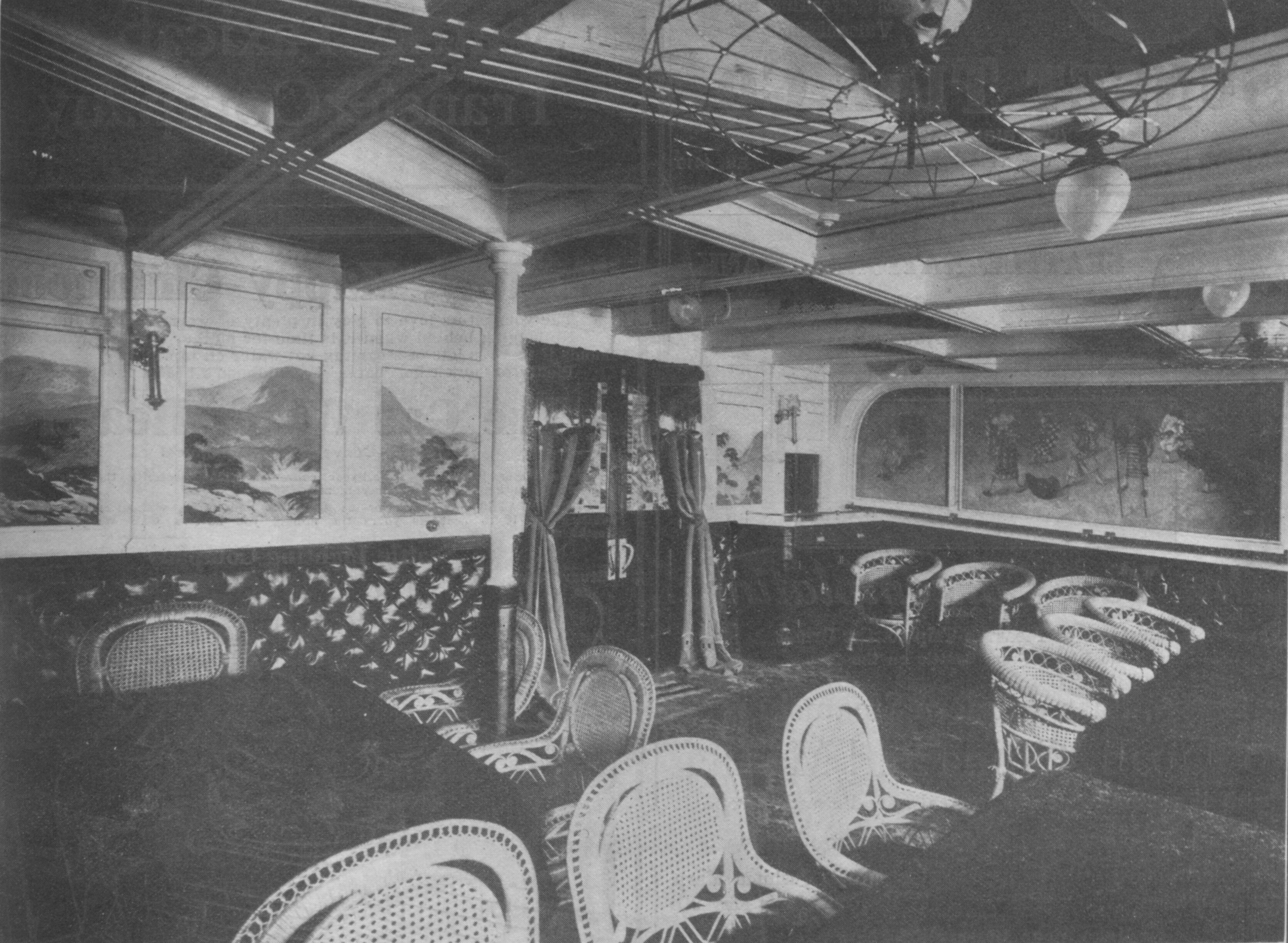
Nursery aboard Katori Maru

Mitsubishi Dockyard and Engineering Works built Katori Maru in Nagasaki for Nippon Yusen Kabushiki Gaisha, completing her in September 1913. She was 499.8 ft (152.3 m) long, had a beam of 59.9 ft (18.3 m) and draught of 28 ft 6 in (8.69 m). Her tonnages were 9,849 GRT and 6,128 NRT.

Katori Maru had three screws. She had two triple-expansion steam engines, one driving each of her port and starboard screws. Exhaust steam from these two engines fed a low-pressure steam turbine that drove her middle screw. Between them the three engines gave her a speed of 14.5 knots (26.9 km/h).

== Identification ==
Katori Maru's code letters were MHWQ. By 1918 she was equipped for wireless telegraphy, and her call sign was JKR. In 1934 the new call sign JKRD superseded her original code letters and call sign.

== Loss ==
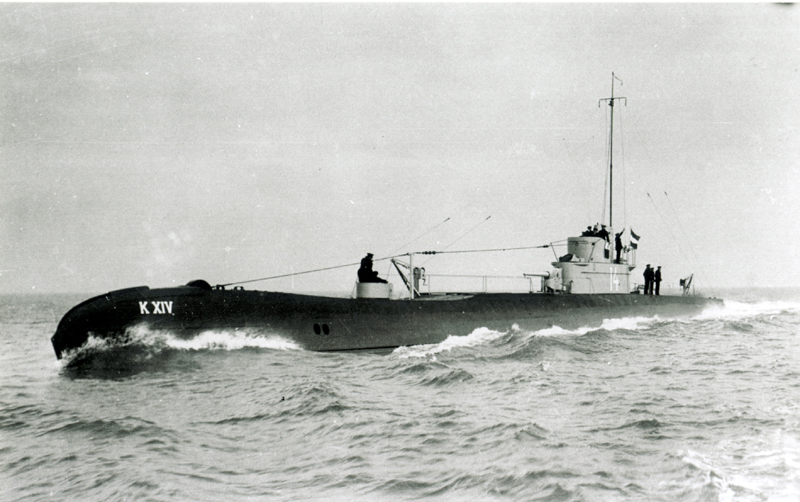
HNLMS K XIV, which sank Katori Maru

In the Second World War the Imperial Japanese Navy requisitioned Katori Maru as a troop ship. In December 1941 she took part in the Japanese invasion of Sarawak. Japanese troops had landed at Miri in central Sarawak on 16 December. Katori Maru was part of a later invasion convoy that landed troops on 23 December at the mouth of the Santubong River in western Sarawak.

The convoy reached the river mouth about 1800 hrs and started to put troops ashore. At either 2040 hrs or 2240 hrs (sources differ), the Dutch submarine HNLMS K XIV torpedoed four ships in the convoy. Katori Maru and another troop ship, Hiyoshi Maru (also called Hie Maru), were sunk at position 02°30′N 110°00′E and the transport ships Hokkai Maru and another ship, either Tonan Maru No 3 or Nichiran Maru, were damaged.

10 members of Katori Maru's crew and an unknown number of Imperial Japanese Army troops were killed.

== Wreck ==
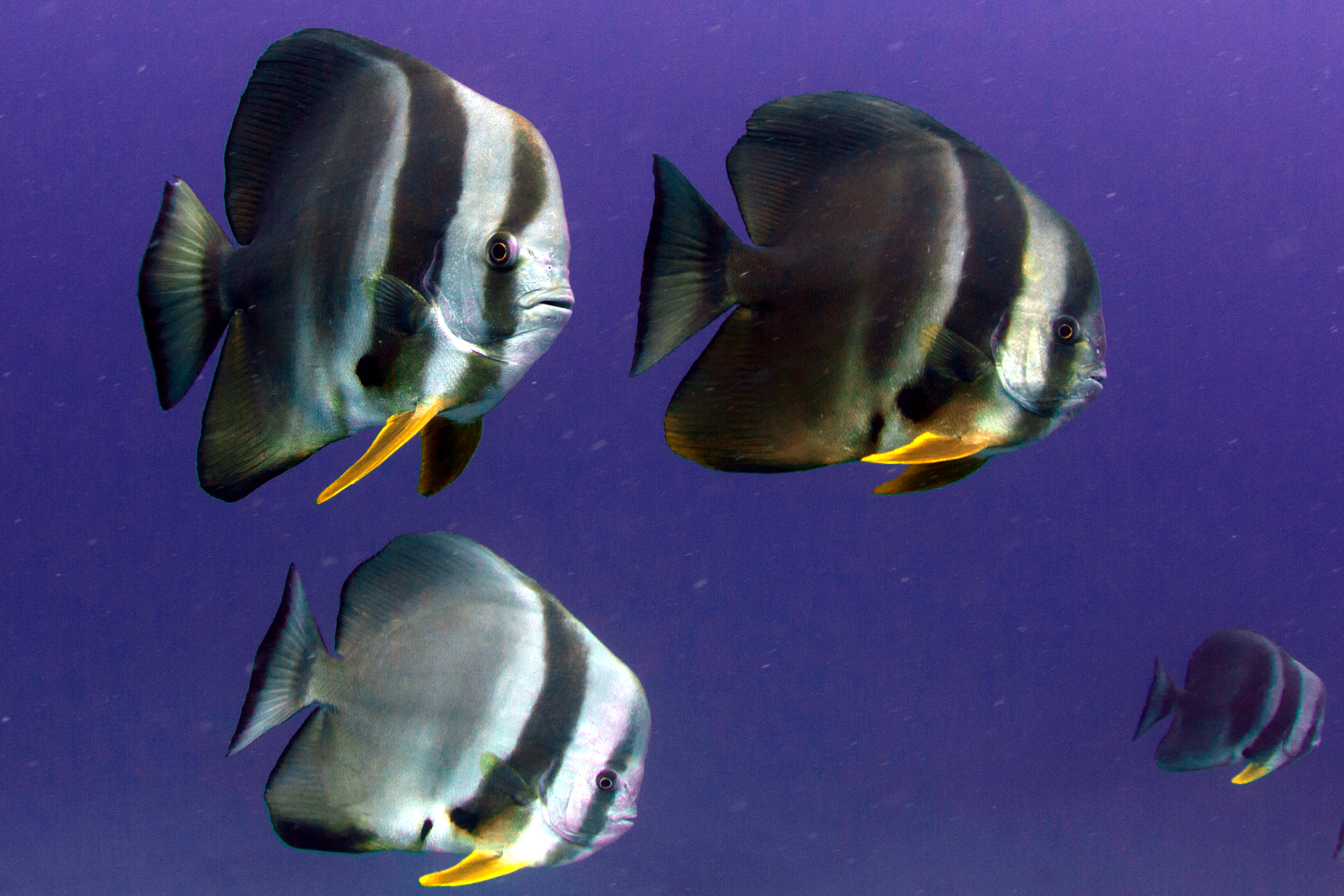
Teira batfish, a species that used to frequent Katori Maru's wreck

Dutch divers discovered Katori Maru's wreck in 2003 at a depth of about 22 m (72 ft). It had become an artificial reef, colonised by coral and inhabited by other marine life including barracuda, giant groupers, moray eels, sharks, teira batfish (also called longfin spadefish) and yellowtail snapper. It started to become a destination for Scuba diving tourism.

In 2013 divers removed artifacts such as sake bottles and even one of the propellers from the wrecks of Katori Maru and Hiyoshi Maru. At the time Sarawak had no law against this.

On 16 September 2013, which is Malaysia Day, volunteer divers removed litter such as fishing nets from the two wrecks that was a hazard to marine life.

On 5 March 2016 a floating crane, a tug and a larger ship were photographed directly over the wreck of Katori Maru. The witness who took the photograph saw scrap metal piled on the deck of the ship. After that incident, divers found most of the wreck had been removed and most of the artificial habitat it formed has been destroyed. Only the bow of Katori Maru and scattered débris remain.

Volunteer divers still care for what little survives of the wreck. On Malaysia Day 2019 they removed 78 kilograms (172 lb) of fishing nets from the site.

In December 2019 the Sarawak State Legislative Assembly belatedly passed the Sarawak Heritage Bill, which includes protection for historic wrecks as underwater heritage.

== Bibliography ==
- Harnack, Edwin P (1930) [1903]. All About Ships & Shipping (4th ed.). London: Faber and Faber. p. 428.
- Li, Gang (2021). The Hui Muslims' Identity Negotiations (PhD Thesis). Groningen: University of Groningen. pp. 212–213.
- "Steamers and Motorships". Lloyd's Register of Shipping (PDF). London: Lloyd's Register. 1930. KAT – via Southampton City Council.
- "Steamers and Motorships". Lloyd's Register of Shipping (PDF). London: Lloyd's Register. 1941. KAT – via Southampton City Council.
- The Marconi Press Agency Ltd (1918). The Year Book of Wireless Telegraphy and Telephony. London: The Wireless Press, Ltd. p. 734.
