= Sadao Yamanaka =

Japanese film director (1909–1938)

- 山中 貞雄
- Born: November 7, 1909; Kyoto City, Kyoto, Japan
- Died: September 17, 1938 (aged 28); Manchukuo
- Other name: Kimpachi Kajiwara
- Occupations: Film director, screenwriter
- Years active: 1932-1938
- Organization: Narutaki-gumi

Sadao Yamanaka (山中 貞雄, Yamanaka Sadao; November 7, 1909 – September 17, 1938) was a Japanese film director and screenwriter who directed about 24 films between 1932 and 1937, all in the jidaigeki genre, of which only three survive in nearly complete form (all of them sound films). He is considered a master filmmaker in his native Japan and one of the greatest talents of his generation alongside Yasujirō Ozu and Kenji Mizoguchi. He was one of the primary figures in the development of the jidaigeki (period drama), especially the samurai subgenre. His films are notable for their emphasis on character over action, and on ninjō over giri. Yamanaka died of dysentery in Manchuria after being drafted into the Imperial Japanese Army. He is the uncle of the Japanese film director Tai Kato, who wrote a book about Yamanaka, Eiga kantoku Yamanaka Sadao.

Kinema Junpo, Japan's leading film magazine, included two of Yamanaka's films (Tange Sazen from 1935 and Humanity and Paper Balloons from 1937) among the top 25 Japanese films of all time, on a list selected by Japanese film experts in 2009. Interest in Yamanaka's work redeveloped after the restoration and Japanese DVD release of the three surviving films. His most internationally discussed film, Humanity and Paper Balloons, was given its first non-Japanese DVD release in the UK as a Masters of Cinema release.

== Career ==
Yamanaka began his career in the Japanese film industry at the age of 20 as a writer and assistant director for the Makino company.

In 1932, he began working for Kanjuro Productions, a small, independent film company similar to many others founded during the same period as it was centered around a popular jidaigeki film star, this time Kanjuro Arashi. Here, he began directing his first films, all of which were jidaigeki. During his first year at Kanjuro, he made six films. He was "discovered" by the critic Matsuo Kishi and gained a reputation for creating films that escaped clichés and focused on social injustices. He formed the Narutaki-gumi with his friends, and they wrote under the pseudonym Kimpachi Kajiwara.

During the 1930s he moved between several film companies, eventually settling in Kyoto and working for the Nikkatsu Company. Most of his films were silent films as sound did not gain a prominence in Japan until 1935-36. He worked twice with the Japanese theatre troupe Zenshin-za: first on The Village Tattooed Man (Machi no Irezumi-mono, 1935) and on his final film, Humanity and Paper Balloons.

=== Wartime and death ===
Yamanaka was drafted into the Japanese army on the same day that Humanity and Paper Balloons premiered. After just over one year, Yamanaka died in a field hospital on 17 September 1938, aged 28, in the Japanese ruled Manchukuo, known today as Manchuria. The cause of death was inflammation of the intestines.

== Style and influences ==
=== Style ===
Early on, Yamanaka had stated an interest in blurring the lines between several genres: comedy, historical epics, and comedy-dramas focusing on average people. Viewers and critics (notably, Donald Richie and Tadao Sato in pioneering studies of Japanese cinema) note in his surviving films the genesis of ideas later explored by the internationally successful Akira Kurosawa, Kenji Mizoguchi, Yasujirō Ozu and Seijun Suzuki.

Yamanaka has been characterized as a minimalist, one whose style favored elegance and rhythm. In fact, he was a close friend of Ozu, who is often noted as a minimalist too. He also shared with Ozu the talent for portraying communities realistically and in rich detail. Yamanaka was a master of staging in depth with which to relate his characters to a wider milieu in the background. Ozu suggested that had he lived, he would have turned to contemporary dramas (Ozu's specialty) instead of jidaigeki.

=== Influences ===
Yamanaka based many of his films' narratives and imagery on foreign films and on Ozu adaptations of the same.

Tange Sazen was based on Stephen Robert's 1932 Lady and Gent, about a boxer and a barmaid who bring up an orphan.

Kōchiyama Sōshun was based on Ozu's Dragnet Girl, about a gangster who is attracted to an innocent young woman, based on Josef von Sternberg's gangster films.

Yamanaka is also said to have been inspired by Hollywood films such as Rouben Mamoulian's City Streets, Edmund Goulding's Grand Hotel and Frank Capra's It Happened One Night.

=== Reception ===
Director Kazuo Kuroki once said of Yamanaka, "Every film he made wonderfully depicted human purity and chastity with a tender, delicate gaze. I was astonished that a young man in his twenties accomplished such perfection."

== Partial filmography (surviving films) ==
- Tange Sazen and the Pot Worth a Million Ryō (1935) - Tange Sazen Yowa: Hyakuman Ryo no Tsubo (丹下左膳余話 百万両の壺)
- Kōchiyama Sōshun (1936) (河内山宗俊)
- Humanity and Paper Balloons (1937) - also known as Ninjo Kamifusen (人情紙風船)
