= Apart from You =

1933 Japanese film

Apart From You
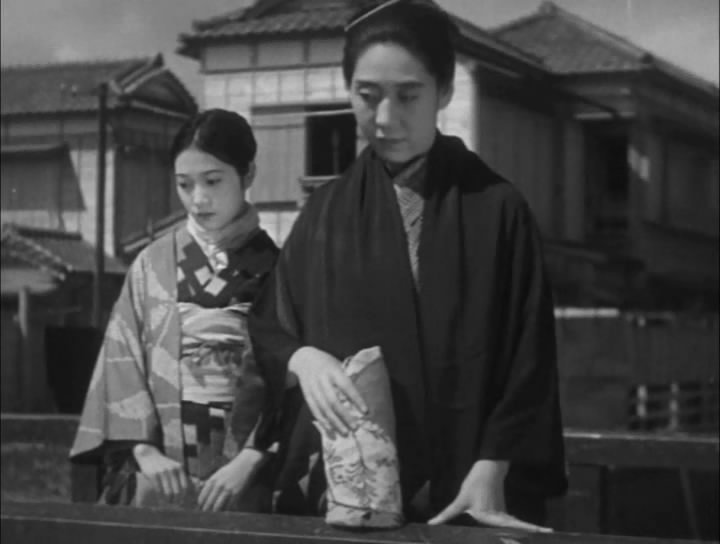
- Directed by: Mikio Naruse
- Written by: Mikio Naruse
- Starring: Mitsuko Yoshikawa; Akio Isono; Sumiko Mizukubo
- Cinematography: Suketaro Inokai
- Production company: Shochiku Company
- Distributed by: Shochiku Company
- Release date: 1 April 1933 (Japan)
- Running time: 60 minutes
- Country: Japan
- Language: Japanese

Apart From You (君と別れて, Kimi to wakarete) is a 1933 Japanese silent drama film written and directed by Mikio Naruse. The film follows an aging geisha whose teenage son is ashamed of her profession, and their relationship with a young colleague of hers.

== Plot ==
Kikue is an aging geisha. Her teenage son, Yoshio, is ashamed of her profession, skipping classes and hanging out with a gang of hoodlums. A young colleague of Kikue, Terugiku, whom Yoshio feels close to like a sister, invites him to her parents' home in a fishermen's village. Yoshio witnesses a fight between Terugiku and her father, because she opposes her family's plan to sell her younger sister Misako to a geisha house like herself, and blames her father for his drinking and irresponsible behaviour. Later, Terugiku confesses to Yoshio her more than platonic feelings for him, and tries to get him to be more understanding of his mother. After a suggested suicide attempt by Kikue, Yoshio decides to return to his studies. When he tells the members of his gang that he wants to quit, he is beaten up and Terugiku injured with a knife. After her recovery, Terugiku leaves the city, hinting at having taken up a profitable occupation which she loathes, only to save her sister Misako from the same fate.

== Cast ==
- Mitsuko Yoshikawa as Kikue
- Akio Isono as Yoshio
- Sumiko Mizukubo as Terugiku
- Reikichi Kawamura as Terugiku's father
- Tatsuko Fuji as Terugiku's mother
- Yōko Fujita as Misako, Terugiku's sister
- Tomio Aoki as Terugiku's brother
- Jun Arai as Kikue's patron
- Chōko Iida as landlady of the geisha house

== Reception ==
In his Critical Handbook of Japanese Film Directors, film scholar Alexander Jacoby described Apart From You, like its successors Every-Night Dreams and Street Without End, as a melodrama "of remarkable intensity", demonstrating "a considerable stylistic virtuosity". Naruse biographer Catherine Russell emphasised the "highly stylized editing" and "complex series of camera movements" of certain scenes, and the film's "pragmatic view of the geisha world". Keith Uhlich of Slant Magazine compared the film's "superficial stylistic flourishes" to Naruse's previous film No Blood Relation, adding that "it is nonetheless a much more focused and sustained work, bearing some evidence—via several beautifully visualized superimpositions—of the director's developing interest in character psychology."

== Legacy ==
Apart From You was shown in the U.S. as part of a Naruse retrospective in 1985, organised by the Kawakita Memorial Film Institute and film scholar Audie Bock.

== Home media ==
In 2011, Apart From You was released on a five-film DVD set by The Criterion Collection's Eclipse label. Titled "Silent Naruse", it collected five silent films made between 1931 and 1934.

== Bibliography ==
- Russell, Catherine (2008). The Cinema of Naruse Mikio: Women and Japanese Modernity. Durham and London: Duke University Press. ISBN 978-0-8223-4290-8.
