= Noboru Ito =

Japanese composer

Noboru Itō
- 伊藤昇
- Born: 31 January 1903; Matsumoto, Japan
- Died: 7 February 1993 (aged 90)
- Occupation: Composer

Noboru Itō (伊藤昇, Itō Noboru; 31 January 1903 – 7 February 1993) was a Japanese composer who wrote experimental pieces for, among others, piano, chamber orchestra, and ballet suites. His work was part of the Art competitions at the 1936 Summer Olympics. During the 1930s and 1940s, he also wrote the music scores for films produced by the P.C.L. film studios and its successor, the Toho film studios, including early works by directors Mikio Naruse and Satsuo Yamamoto.

== Film music (selected) ==
- 1935: The Actress and the Poet
- 1935: Wife! Be Like a Rose!
- 1935: The Girl in the Rumor
- 1936: Morning's Tree-Lined Street
- 1937: Ojōsan
- 1937: Haha no kyoku
- 1943: Momotarō no umiwashi
- 1946: Those Who Make Tomorrow
