= Every-Night Dreams =

1933 Japanese film

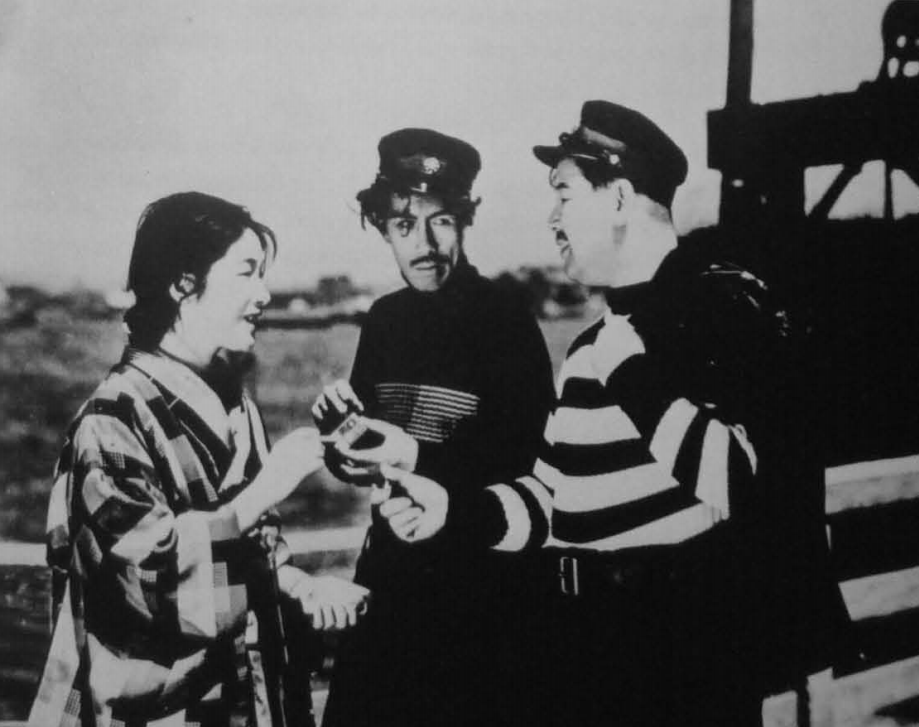
- Sumiko Kurishima, Shigeru Ogura and Kenji Oyama in Every-Night Dreams
- Directed by: Mikio Naruse
- Written by: Tadao Ikeda (screenplay); Mikio Naruse (story)
- Starring: Sumiko Kurishima; Tatsuo Saitō; Mitsuko Yoshikawa
- Cinematography: Suketaro Inokai
- Music by: Masao Koga
- Production company: Shochiku
- Distributed by: Shochiku
- Release date: 8 June 1933 (Japan)
- Running time: 64 minutes
- Country: Japan
- Language: Japanese

Every-Night Dreams (夜ごとの夢, Yogoto no yume) is a 1933 Japanese silent drama film directed by Mikio Naruse. The film follows a single mother who works as a bar hostess and her struggles to provide for her son in depression-era Japan.

== Plot ==
Omitsu works as a hostess in a harbour bar entertaining docked sailors. Since her husband left three years ago, she supports her son Fumio on her own, and shares a flat with a couple who babysit for her. Returning home after a few weeks of absence, Omitsu learns that an unknown man has repeatedly been trying to see her.

The stranger turns out to be Omitsu's husband Mizuhara, who begs for her forgiveness and wants to see his son. Reluctant at first, she finally gives in, and the couple reconcile. Mizuhara declares his intention to take care of his family. However, due to his weak constitution, he is unable to find work. During an argument, she urges him not to give up, while he asks her to look for a more "serious" job. Soon after, Fumio is hit by a car, and needs hospital care beyond his parents' means. To keep Omitsu from returning to her hostess job, Mizuhara pretends that he has friends who will lend him money.

Later that night, Mizuhara commits a robbery. When Omitsu realises his crime, she rejects the money and tries to convince him to turn himself in. Mizuhara leaves, asking Omitsu to take care of their son. The next morning, Omitsu learns that Mizuhara has drowned himself. She tears his suicide note apart with her teeth, blaming him for his cowardice. She then pleads with Fumio to grow up to be a strong man.

== Cast ==
- Sumiko Kurishima as Omitsu
- Tatsuo Saitō as Mizuhara, Omitsu's husband
- Teruko Kojima as Fumio, Omitsu's son
- Jun Arai as Neighbor
- Mitsuko Yoshikawa as Neighbor's wife
- Takeshi Sakamoto as Captain
- Kenji Oyama as Sailor
- Shigeru Ogura as Sailor
- Chōko Iida as Proprietress
- Tsuruko Kumoi as Waitress
- Teruko Wakamizu as Waitress
- Ranko Sawa as Friend of Omitsu

== Reception ==
Film scholar Alexander Jacoby saw Every-Night Dreams, together with Naruse's Apart From You (1933) and Street Without End (1934), as a series of melodramas "of remarkable intensity, where potential happiness is thwarted by hostile environments and practical responsibilities", demonstrating "a considerable stylistic virtuosity".

Keith Uhlich of Slant Magazine gave the film four out of four stars, saying, "[l]ike many Naruse films of the '30s, Every Night Dreams is somewhat stylistically unhinged, yet the constant rapid push-ins and frenetic cutting (particularly during a striking montage of running legs) feel more to the psychological point than in comparatively showier works like Not Blood Relations and Street Without End."

Midnight Eye reviewer Roger Macy stated that Every-Night Dreams "is arguably one of the most famous Japanese films of the silent era and has had considerable attention in the literature […] [t]he story develops with superbly measured pace, with scenes of great comedy and others of much pathos, depicting the world of the great depression for those at the bottom of the heap."

== Legacy ==
Every-Night Dreams was shown at the Museum of Modern Art in 1985 as part of its retrospective on Mikio Naruse and at the Berlin International Film Festival in 2007 in its "Retrospektive" program.

== Home media ==
In 2011, Every-Night Dreams was released on a five-film DVD set by The Criterion Collection's Eclipse label. Titled Silent Naruse, it collected five silent films made between 1931 and 1934.
