= Blue Ribbon Award for Best Cinematography =

Japanese film award for cinematography

- Awarded for: Best Performance by a Cinematography
- Country: Japan
- Presented by: The Association of Tokyo Film Journalists
- First award: 1950
- Final award: 1965

The Blue Ribbon Award for Best Cinematography is a prize recognizing the work of a cinematography of a Japanese film. It was awarded annually by the Association of Tokyo Film Journalists as one of the Blue Ribbon Awards. It was lastly awarded in 1965 at 16th Blue Ribbon Awards and discontinued.

== List of winners ==
No.	Year	Cinematographer	Film(s)
1	1950	Asakazu Nakai	Itsuwareru Gisō
2	1951	Yūharu Atsuta	Wagaya wa Tanoshi; Ano Oka Koete; Early Summer
3	1952	Kazuo Miyagawa	Senbazuru
4	1953	Mitsuo Miura	Where Chimneys Are Seen; Gan
5	1954	N/A	N/A
6	1955	Hiroshi Kusuda	Tōi Kumo; She Was Like a Wild Chrysanthemum
7	1956	Mitsuo Miura	The Legend of the White Serpent; Neko to Shōzō to Futari no Onna
8	1957	N/A	N/A
9	1958	Kazuo Miyagawa	Enjō; Benten Kozō
10	1959	Setsuo Kobayashi	Fires on the Plain
11	1960	Kazuo Miyagawa	Her Brother
12	1961	N/A	N/A
13	1962	N/A	N/A
14	1963	N/A	N/A
15	1964	Seiki Kuroda	Onibaba
16	1965	Kōzō Okazaki	Rokujō Yukiyama Tsumugi
