= Chieko Nakakita =

Japanese actress (1926–2005)

- 中北千枝子
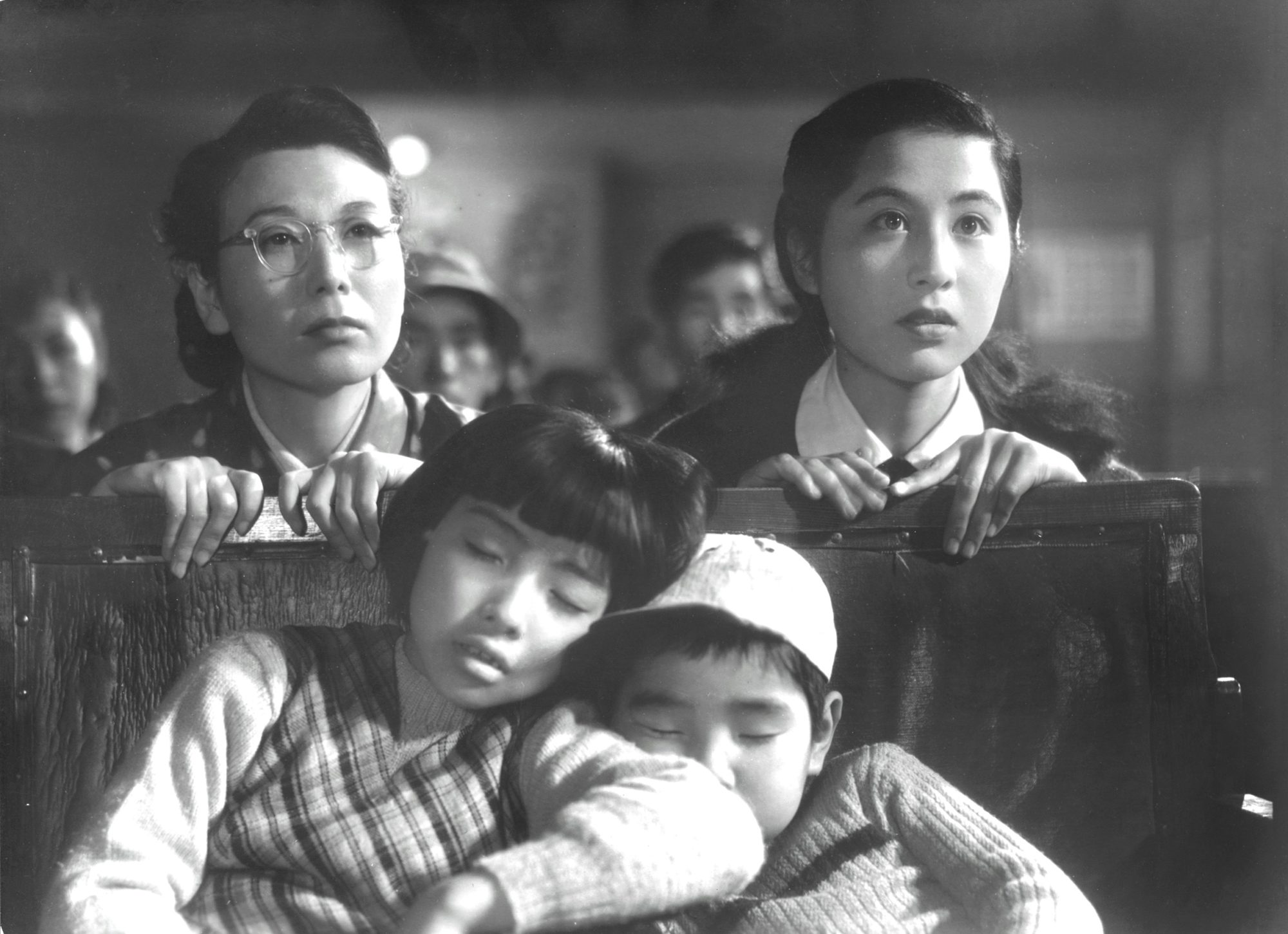
- Chieko Nakakita (upper left) in Mother (1952)
- Born: 21 May 1926; Shitaya-ku, Tokyo, Japan
- Died: 13 September 2005 (aged 79); Shibuya-ku, Tokyo, Japan
- Occupation: Actress
- Years active: 1944–1983
- Spouse: Tomoyuki Tanaka (m. 1950)
- Children: 4

Chieko Nakakita (中北千枝子, Nakakita Chieko, 21 May 1926 – 13 September 2005) was a Japanese actress. She appeared in the early films of Akira Kurosawa and later starred in many films by Mikio Naruse.

== Biography ==
After graduating from Tokyo Film School (東京映画学校), Chieko Nakakita entered the Toho film studios and gave her debut in Yasujirō Shimazu's Nichijō no tatakai (1944). Her first film with Kurosawa was Those Who Make Tomorrow (1946), which he co-directed but disowned. Later films with Kurosawa include One Wonderful Sunday (1947), Drunken Angel (1948) and The Quiet Duel (1949). During the 1948 strike at Toho, Nakakita, like actresses Yoshiko Kuga and Setsuko Wakayama, sided with the unionists.

Her first film with Naruse was the 1950 White Beast, followed by regular supporting roles in the director's most important films, such as Repast (1951), Lightning (1952), for which she received the Blue Ribbon Award and the Mainichi Film Concours, Floating Clouds (1955) and Flowing (1956). Other directors Nakakita worked with include Yasujirō Ozu, Shirō Toyoda and Masaki Kobayashi. After 1970, she turned completely to television work, except for her final film, the 1983 Tora-san's Song of Love.

== Personal life ==
Nakakita was married to Toho film producer Tomoyuki Tanaka, who was sixteen years her senior. Together they had three sons and adopted a daughter named Mieko.

She died in her Tokyo home in 2005, 79 years old.

== Filmography (selected) ==
- 1944: Nichijō no tatakai (dir. Yasujirō Shimazu)
- 1946: Those Who Make Tomorrow (dir. Akira Kurosawa, Hideo Sekigawa, Kajirō Yamamoto)
- 1946: No Regrets for Our Youth (dir. Akira Kurosawa)
- 1947: One Wonderful Sunday (dir. Akira Kurosawa)
- 1948: Drunken Angel (dir. Akira Kurosawa)
- 1949: The Quiet Duel (dir. Akira Kurosawa)
- 1950: Conduct Report on Professor Ishinaka (dir. Mikio Naruse)
- 1950: White Beast (dir. Mikio Naruse)
- 1951: Repast (dir. Mikio Naruse)
- 1952: Mother (dir. Mikio Naruse)
- 1952: Lightning (dir. Mikio Naruse)
- 1954: Somewhere Under The Broad Sky (dir. Masaki Kobayashi)
- 1955: Floating Clouds (dir. Mikio Naruse)
- 1955: The Grass Whistle a.k.a. Love Never Fails (dir. Shirō Toyoda)
- 1956: Sudden Rain (dir. Mikio Naruse)
- 1956: Early Spring (dir. Yasujirō Ozu)
- 1956: Flowing (dir. Mikio Naruse)
- 1958: Anzukko (dir. Mikio Naruse)
- 1960: When a Woman Ascends the Stairs (dir. Mikio Naruse)
- 1961: The Story of Osaka Castle (dir. Hiroshi Inagaki)
- 1961: As a Wife, As a Woman (dir. Mikio Naruse)
- 1961: Girls of the Night (dir. Kinuyo Tanaka)
- 1964: Yearning (dir. Mikio Naruse)
- 1966: The Stranger Within a Woman (dir. Mikio Naruse)
- 1983: Tora-san's Song of Love (dir. Yōji Yamada)

== Awards ==
Chieko Nakakita received the 1952 Blue Ribbon Award for Best Supporting Actress for Lightning and Oka wa hanazakari and the 1952 Mainichi Film Concours For Best Supporting Actress for Lightning, Mother and Oka wa hanazakari.
