= Nobuko (film) =

1940 Japanese film

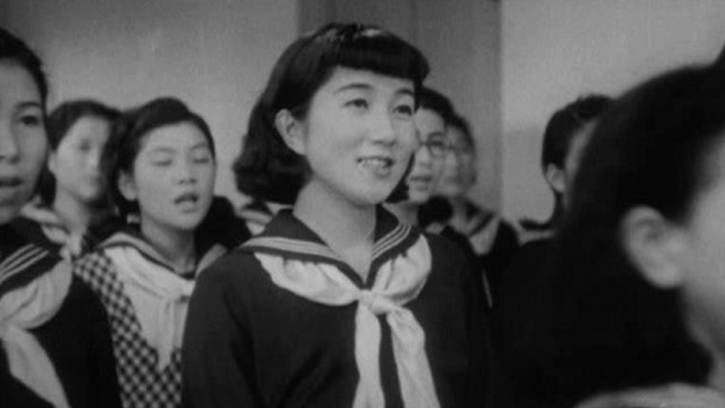
- Mitsuko Miura in Nobuko

Japanese name
- Kanji: 信子
- Directed by: Hiroshi Shimizu
- Written by: Yoshitomo Nagase; Bunroku Shishi (novel)
- Produced by: Akira Otsuji
- Starring: Mieko Takamine; Mitsuko Miura; Chōko Iida
- Cinematography: Yūharu Atsuta
- Edited by: Yoshiyasu Hamamura
- Music by: Senji Itō
- Production company: Shochiku
- Distributed by: Shochiku
- Release date: April 1940 (Japan)
- Running time: 90 minutes
- Country: Japan
- Language: Japanese

Nobuko (信子, Nobuko) is a 1940 Japanese drama film directed by Hiroshi Shimizu. It is based on the novel of the same name by Bunroku Shishi.

== Plot ==
Young teacher Nobuko starts her new job in a girls' school in Tokyo, residing at the place of her aunt Okei, a geisha instructor. Not only is she admonished by the school principal for her heavy rural accent, but also for living in a geisha house which is regarded irreconcilable with the school's reputation. As a consequence, Nobuko moves into the school's dormitory as one of the boarding masters.

Nobuko becomes the repeated target of pranks by rebellious pupil Eiko, and learns that neither the principals nor the teachers take measures against her, as her father is an important financier of the institute. She eventually gains respect and popularity among the students, but Eiko retains her disrespectful attitude. After repeated misbehavings, Nobuko exerts a collective punishment of the pupils, which leads to Eiko's social isolation and suicide attempt. While watching over her at her sickbed, Nobuko learns from Eiko that her behaviour was only a means of getting attention and affection which she didn't find at home. The schoolboard considers Nobuko's dismissal to appease Eiko's father, but is instead urged by him to keep Nobuko and treat his daughter like the other girls.

== Cast ==
- Mieko Takamine as Nobuko Komiyama
- Mitsuko Miura as Eiko Hosokawa
- Chōko Iida as Okei, Nobuko's aunt
- Fumiko Okamura as Mrs. Sekiguchi, school principal
- Masami Morikawa as Mrs. Hosaka, vice principal
- Eiko Takamatsu as Fusako Yoshioka, teacher
- Setsuko Shinobu as Yasuko Tezuka, teacher
- Misao Matsubara as Mrs. Matsubara, teacher
- Sachiko Mitani as Chako, a geisha apprentice
- Mitsuko Yoshikawa as Eiko's stepmother
- Shin'yō Nara as Mr. Hosokawa, Eiko's father
- Shin'ichi Himori as Burglar

== Legacy ==
Nobuko was released by Shochiku in 2008 as part of a Hiroshi Shimizu DVD box set, also containing his films Children in the Wind, Introspection Tower and Four Seasons of Children, and as a single DVD in 2013. A screening of the film was provided by the Cinémathèque française in 2020 and 2021.

Shishi's novel was again adapted for Japanese television in later years, including versions in 1957, 1964 and 1965.
