= Mitsuko Miura =

Japanese actress (1917-1969)

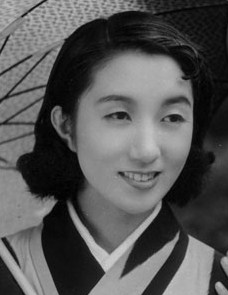
- Mitsuko Miura in Himetaru kokoro (1940)
- Born: 17 January 1917; Ushigome, Tokyo
- Died: 14 June 1969 (aged 52)
- Occupation: Actress
- Years active: 1938–1964
- Spouse: George Gouda (divorced)

Mitsuko Miura (三浦光子, Miura Mitsuko; 17 January 1917 – 14 June 1969) was a Japanese actress active from 1938 to 1964. She appeared in over 150 films under the direction of filmmakers like Mikio Naruse, Kenji Mizoguchi and Hiroshi Shimizu.

== Biography ==
After graduating from Otsuma Girls' High School, Tokyo, Mitsuko Miura joined the Nichigeki dancing team before signing to the Shochiku film studio. She gave her film debut in 1938 with Hotaru no hikari and appeared in films of Hiroshi Shimizu, Kenji Mizoguchi and Noboru Nakamura. After 1950, she worked for numerous different film companies, starring, among others, in a number of films of Mikio Naruse. She retired from film business in 1964 and died in 1969.

== Selected filmography ==
- 1938: Hotaru no hikari (螢の光) – dir. Yasushi Sasaki
- 1938: The Masseurs and a Woman (按摩と女 Anma to onna) – dir. Hiroshi Shimizu
- 1940: Nobuko (信子 Nobuko) – dir. Hiroshi Shimizu
- 1940: Himetaru kokoro (秘めたる心) – dir. Hideo Ōba
- 1941: The 47 Ronin a.k.a. The Loyal 47 Ronin of the Genroku Era (元禄忠臣蔵 Genroku chūshingura) – dir. Kenji Mizoguchi
- 1942: Aratanaru kōfuku (新たなる幸福) – dir. Noboru Nakamura
- 1945: Izu no musumetachi (伊豆の娘たち) – dir. Heinosuke Gosho
- 1946: Morning for the Osone Family (大曾根家の朝 Ōsone-ke no asa) – dir. Keisuke Kinoshita
- 1946: Victory of Women (女性の勝利 Josei no shōri) – dir. Kenji Mizoguchi
- 1948: The Portrait (肖像 Shōzō) – dir. Keisuke Kinoshita
- 1950: White Beast (白い野獣 Shiroi yaju) – dir. Mikio Naruse
- 1952: Sisters of Nishijin (西陣の姉妹 Nishijin no shimai) – dir. Kōzaburō Yoshimura
- 1952: Lightning (稲妻 Inazuma) – dir. Mikio Naruse
- 1956: The Kuroda Affair (黒田騒動 Kuroda sōdō) – dir. Tomu Uchida
- 1957: Untamed (あらくれ Arakure) – dir. Mikio Naruse
- 1964: Naked Shadow (裸の影 Hadaka no kage) – dir. Kōji Wakamatsu
