= Travelling Actors =

1940 Japanese film

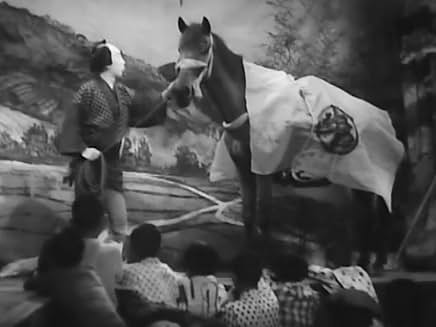

Japanese name
- Kanji: 旅役者
- Directed by: Mikio Naruse
- Written by: Mikio Naruse; Mushū Ui (short story)
- Produced by: Himuro Teppei
- Starring: Kamatari Fujiwara; Kan Yanagiya; Minoru Takase
- Cinematography: Seiichi Kizuka
- Music by: Fumio Hayasaki
- Production company: Toho
- Distributed by: Toho
- Release date: 18 December 1940 (Japan)
- Running time: 71 minutes
- Country: Japan
- Language: Japanese

Travelling Actors (Japanese: 旅役者, romanized: Tabi yakusha) is a 1940 Japanese comedy film written and directed by Mikio Naruse. It is based on a short story by Mushū Ui.

== Plot ==
A kabuki theatre troupe from Tokyo, led by the "famous" Kikugoro, arrives at a rural village for a series of performances. Jin, the town's barber, who was talked into co-sponsoring the event, realises that the "star" is only an actor who uses the famous family name as a publicity stunt. While drunk and angrily searching for his business partner Wakasaya, Jin accidentally destroys the head of the horse costume of actors Hyoroku and Senpei. When Hyoroku rejects to perform in the sloppily repaired costume, Kikugoro decides to use a real horse for the play instead and makes Hyoroku the stable boy. Hyoroku, drunk and enraged about the degradation, puts on the horse costume with Senpei and chases the real horse away.

== Cast ==
- Kamatari Fujiwara as Hyoroku
- Kan Yanagiya as Senpei
- Minoru Takase as Nakamura Kikugoro VI
- Zekō Nakamura as Jin, the barber
- Kō Mihashi as Wakasaya
- Sōji Kiyokawa as Shichiemon Ichikawa

== Legacy ==
In later years, director Mikio Naruse cited Travelling Actors, despite interventions from the censors during production, as one of his personal favourites. Naruse biographer Catherine Russell saw Travelling Actors, alongside Hideko the Bus Conductor and This Happy Life, as part of a series of films with an "interesting twist on national policy principles in that they point to a certain sacred character of everyday life […] and characters gaining some kind of insight in [its] value".

Travelling Actors was screened at the Harvard Film Archive in 2005 as part of its retrospective on Mikio Naruse.
