= Takase =

Takase may refer to:

- Takase (surname)
- Takase, Kagawa, a Japanese town
- Takase River, a canal in Kyoto, Japan
- Takase Station (Kagawa), a railway station
- Takase Station (Yamagata), a railway station
- 2838 Takase, an asteroid
- Takase shell from a type of large conch shells, see Nacre
