= Yukiko Tsukuba =

Japanese actress

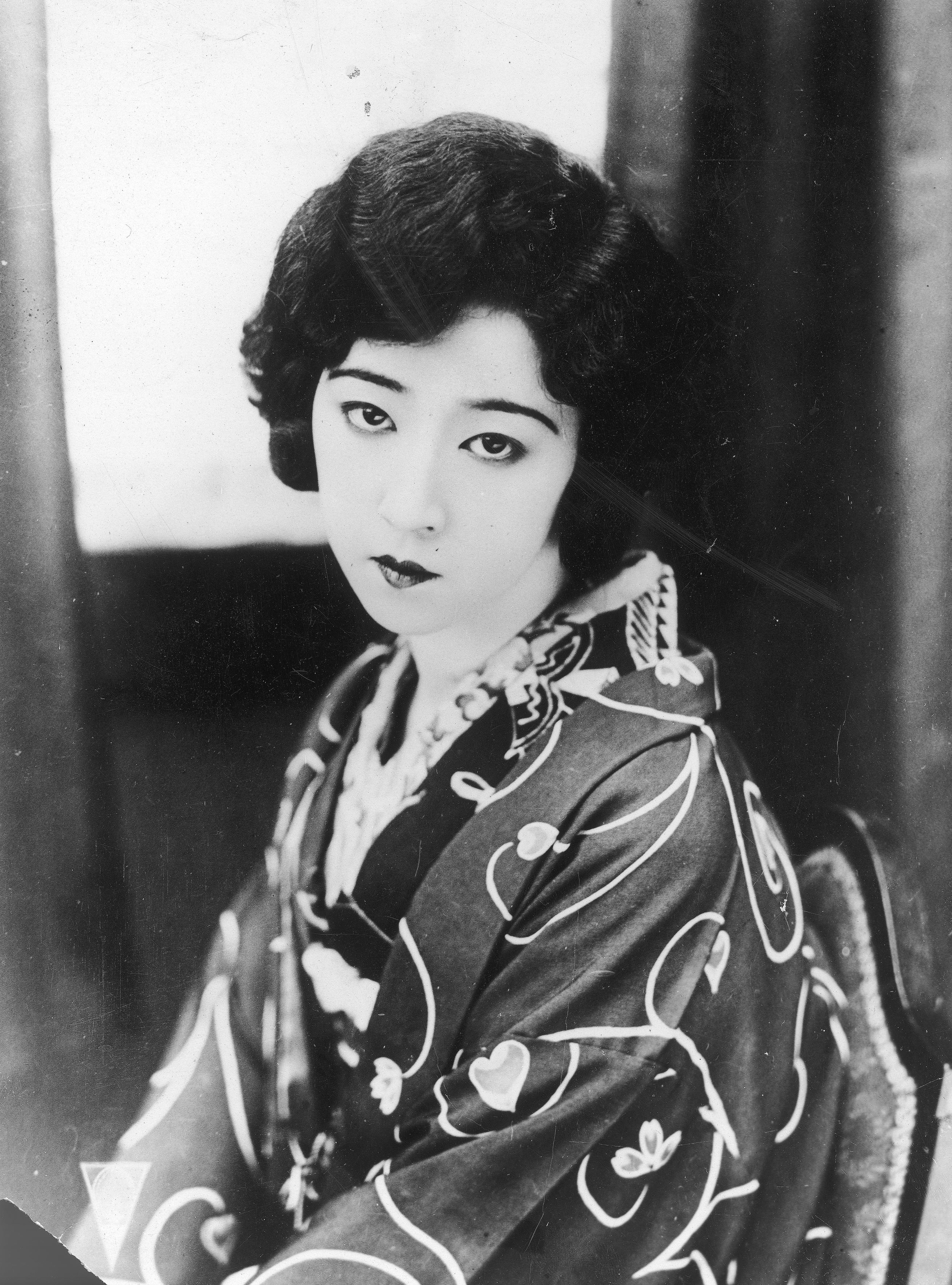
- Born: Yukiko Sato; June 10, 1906; Tokyo, Japan
- Died: June 1977 (age 70); Setagaya, Japan
- Occupation: Actress
- Spouse: Jinkichi Terada

Yukiko Tsukuba (筑波雪子, Tsukuba Yukiko; June 10, 1906 – early June 1977) was a Japanese actress on stage, in silent films, and in early sound films. She was also the All-Japan women's billiards champion in 1929.

== Early life ==
Tsukuba was born in Tokyo. She trained as a geisha, and became an internationally publicized beauty and film star while she was still in her teens.

== Career ==
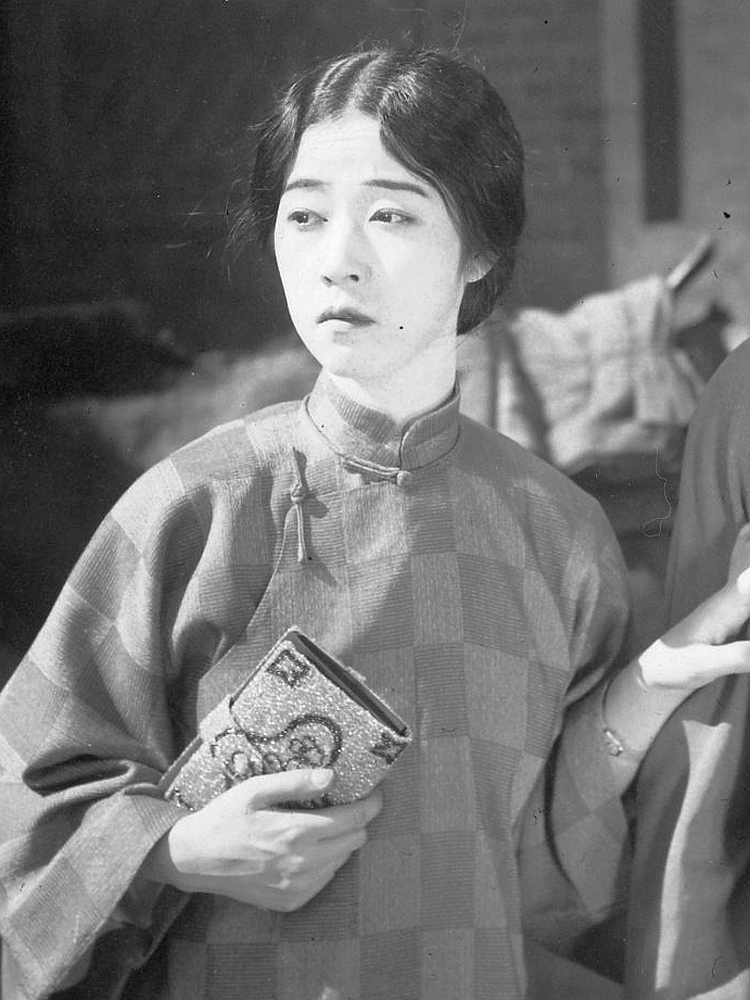
Yukiko Tsukuba in Minzoku no sakebi, 1928

Tsukuba began her screen career at the Shochiku studio. She worked with directors including Yasujiro Shimazu, Hiroshi Shimizu, Yoshinobu Ikeda, Heinosuke Gosho, Kiyohiko Ushihara, Buntaro Futagawa, Torajiro Saito, and Mikio Naruse. She was dubbed "the Mary Pickford of Japan" in a 1926 American newspaper.

With actor Tsuzuya Moroguchi, Tsukuba started a short-lived production company, in 1927. In 1929, she won the All-Japan Women's Billiards championship.

== Selected filmography ==
- Otoro-gokoro (1925, A Man's Heart)
- Junanbana (1926, The Second Kiss)
- Nasanu naka (1932, No Blood Relation)

== Personal life ==
Tsukuba married businessman and politician Jinkichi Terada in 1942. Her husband died in 1976, and she died in 1977, from stomach cancer, at the age of 70, in Setagaya.
