= Kamatari =

Kamatari may refer to:

- Fujiwara no Kamatari (614–669), the founder of the Fujiwara clan
- Kamatari Fujiwara (1905–1985), a Japanese actor
- Honjō Kamatari, a character from Rurouni Kenshin
- Kamatari (jitsu), the summoning animal of Temari (Naruto) in Naruto
