= The Lone Journey =

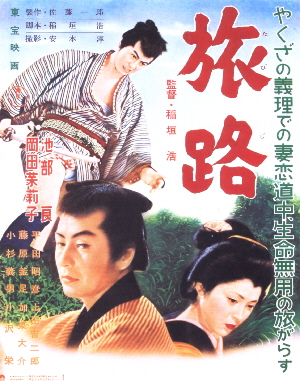
- Japanese movie poster
- Directed by: Hiroshi Inagaki
- Written by: Shin Hasegawa (story); Hiroshi Inagaki (writer)
- Produced by: Ichirō Satō
- Cinematography: Jun Yasumoto
- Music by: Shirō Fukai
- Distributed by: Toho
- Release date: August 31, 1955
- Running time: 91 minutes
- Country: Japan
- Language: Japanese

The Lone Journey (旅路, Tabiji), also known as The Road, is a 1955 black-and-white Japanese film directed by Hiroshi Inagaki.

Production design was by Takeo Kita and Makoto Sono and sound recording was by Choshichiro Mikami. The lighting technician was Shigeru Mori.

== Cast ==
Actor	Role
Ryō Ikebe	Naojiro Mikazuki
Mariko Okada	Otaka
Akihiko Hirata	Horikoshi no Masakichi
Katsuji Ichikawa	Kinosuke
Eitaro Ozawa	Harashima no Tokutaro (Sakae Ozawa)
Kamatari Fujiwara	Gorosaku
Mitsuko Takao	Oriki
Yoshio Kosugi	Iwataro
Seijiro Onda	
Daisuke Katō	
Kichijiro Ueda	
Akira Tani	
Minosuke Yamada	
Noriko Honma	
Sadayoshi Nakamura	
Tomeko Umayato	
Sonosuke Sawamura	
