= Morning's Tree-Lined Street =

1936 Japanese film

Japanese name
- Kanji: 朝の並木路
- Directed by: Mikio Naruse
- Written by: Mikio Naruse
- Starring: Sachiko Chiba; Heihachirō Ōkawa; Ranko Akagi
- Cinematography: Hiroshi Suzuki
- Edited by: Kōichi Iwashita
- Music by: Noboru Itō
- Production company: P.C.L.
- Distributed by: P.C.L.
- Release date: 1 November 1936 (Japan)
- Running time: 60 minutes
- Country: Japan
- Language: Japanese

Morning's Tree-Lined Street (Japanese: 朝の並木路, romanized: Asa no namikimichi) is a 1936 Japanese drama film written and directed by Mikio Naruse.

== Plot ==
Chiyo, a young country woman, moves to Tokyo, hoping that her friend Hisako, who allegedly works at a big company, will help her finding a job. As it turns out, Hisako works as a hostess in a shady bar in the Shiba district under the name of Shigeyo. Chiyo, reluctant to the idea to work as a hostess, tries to find a job in the city, but offers are scarce. While studying the newspaper, she learns of the double suicide of a business man, who stole money from his company, and his hostess. Hisako finds the idea of a double suicide of a loving couple romantic, but Chiyo disagrees.

Chiyo gets acquainted with Ogawa, a customer in the bar, who offers to help her with her job search. After repeated rejections, Chiyo finally starts working as a hostess, and gets drunk with Ogawa one evening. Later, they go on holiday together, visiting Chiyo's parents and residing in exclusive apartments. Although happily making plans for the future, Chiyo is irritated by Ogawa's erratic behaviour whenever he sees the police. Stopped by a police cordon, he drags Chiyo into the woods, confesses that he embezzled money from his company, and tries to talk her into committing suicide with him. Chiyo fends him off, finally waking up to find that her journey with Ogawa was a drunken dream. Ogawa visits Chiyo to tell her that he has been promoted and sent to Sendai, and gives her his new address in case she should feel like writing him. After he has left, Chiyo throws the note with his address into the water, determined to continue her job search.

== Cast ==
- Sachiko Chiba as Chiyo
- Heihachirō Ōkawa as Ogawa
- Ranko Akagi as Hisako/Shigeyo
- Nijiko Kiyokawa as Fusako
- Satoko Date as Mitsuko
- Hatsuko Natsume as Fujiko
- Tamae Kiyokawa as Madame
- Masao Mishima as Madame's husband
- Kō Mihashi as Chiyo's father

== Reception ==
Naruse biographer Catherine Russell calls Morning's Tree-Lined Street a "romantic fantasy", as it links Chiyo's dream, which Russell describes as "clearly a movie-influenced" one, to the romantic notion of travel.
