= Wedding Ring (film) =

- Film poster
- Kanji: 婚約指環
- Directed by: Keisuke Kinoshita
- Written by: Keisuke Kinoshota
- Cinematography: Hiroshi Kusuda
- Production company: Shochiku
- Release date: 1950
- Country: Japan
- Language: Japanese

Wedding Ring (Japanese: 婚約指環, Hepburn: Kon'yaku yubiwa), also known as Engagement Ring, is a Japanese black and white film directed by Keisuke Kinoshita that was first released in 1950.

The film depicts a love triangle involving an ill husband, his wife and his doctor. The husband (Michio) was drafted into the army for World War II shortly after the marriage, and didn't return home until 2 years after the war ended. He became ill a year after his return so the marriage bond has not had much chance to strengthen. When a handsome new doctor (Mr. Ema) begins to take care of Michio, the doctor and the wife (Noriko) begin to fall in love. Ema and Noriko have to balance their desires against their moral obligations, while Michio has to deal with his own emotions about the emerging situation.

Certain objects play key roles in the narrative. For example, whether the wife wears her engagement ring symbolizes her willingness or not to commit adultery with the doctor, and whether or not the doctor wears the shoes that the wife buys for him symbolizes his willingness or not to commit adultery with her. A railroad crossing where they have their first conversation symbolizes the danger of their flirting.

== Cast ==
- Jûkichi Uno − Michio Kuki
- Kinuyo Tanaka – Noriko Kuki
- Mitsuko Yoshikawa – Grandmother
- Toshirô Mifune – Takeshi Ema
