= Takase (surname) =

Takase (written: 高瀬 lit. "tall shallows" or "shallow river") is a Japanese surname. Notable people with the surname include:

- Aki Takase (高瀬 アキ, born 1948), Japanese jazz pianist and composer
- Akimitsu Takase (高瀬 右光, born 1970), Japanese voice actor
- Ayami Takase (高瀬 礼美, born 1978), Japanese tennis player
- Daiju Takase (高瀬 大樹, born 1978), Japanese mixed martial artist
- Hiroshi Takase (高瀬 洋, 1955–2006), Japanese cinematographer and visual effects editor
- Kei Takase (高瀬 慧, born 1988), Japanese sprinter
- Megumi Takase (高瀬 愛実, born 1990), Japanese women's footballer
- Minoru Takase (高勢 実乗, 1890–1947), Japanese actor and comedian

== Fictional characters ==
- Yayoi Takase (高瀬 弥生), a character in the anime series Marmalade Boy
