= Mitsuo Miura =

Japanese cinematographer (1902–1956)

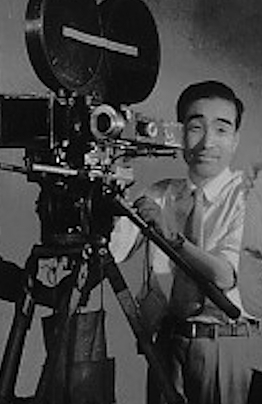
- Miura on the set of Dispersed Clouds (1951)
- Born: 25 October 1902; Miyagi Prefecture, Japan
- Died: 24 October 1956 (aged 53)
- Occupation: Cinematographer
- Years active: 1925–1956
- Awards: Mainichi Film Award; Blue Ribbon Award

Mitsuo Miura (三浦光雄, Miura Mitsuo, 25 October 1902 – 24 October 1956) was a Japanese cinematographer who photographed more than 100 films in a career that spanned 30 years. He worked for film directors such as Shirō Toyoda, Heinosuke Gosho, Mikio Naruse, Shigeyoshi Suzuki, and Kajirō Yamamoto. An award for new cinematographers was named after him in his memory.

== Biography ==
Miura was born in Miyagi Prefecture. He entered the Kamata section of the Shochiku film studios, where he shot his first film in 1925. In 1928, Miura made a trip to Hollywood for reasons of research, where he was impressed by the use of shadows in the films of Josef von Sternberg and the abundant lighting in Hollywood films in general. In an article he later contributed to the publication of the Japan Film Photographers Club (modeled on the American Society of Cinematographers), Miura emphasised the importance of lighting and tones in camerawork.

After leaving Shochiku in the early 1930s, Miura worked for Nikkatsu, Fuji Eigasha, and Takako Irie's Irie Productions before finally entering P.C.L. (later Toho) in the late 1930s. Films he worked on at P.C.L. included Mikio Naruse's A Woman's Sorrows and Learn From Experience (both 1937). In 1942, he photographed the war propaganda film The War at Sea from Hawaii to Malaya.

After the war, Miura resumed working for Toho, but left following the strikes at the studio and joined Heinosuke Gosho's new production company, Studio Eight. He worked on Gosho's films, from Dispersed Clouds to Where Chimneys Are Seen, after which the company disbanded. In his last years, he worked repeatedly for director Shirō Toyoda on films like The Wild Geese, Marital Relations, and A Cat, Shozo, and Two Women, his final film.

Miura died in 1956 at the age of 53. The Japan Film Photographers Club initiated the Mitsuo Miura Award for new cinematographers in his memory. In their 1959 book The Japanese Film – Art & Industry, Donald Richie and Joseph L. Anderson titled Miura "one of Japan's best cameramen." One of his apprentices was Hajime Koizumi, later regular cameraman for Ishirō Honda.

== Filmography (selected) ==
- 1931: Flunky, Work Hard!
- 1937: A Woman's Sorrows
- 1937: Learn From Experience
- 1942: The War at Sea from Hawaii to Malaya
- 1947: Once More
- 1951: Dispersed Clouds
- 1953: Where Chimneys Are Seen
- 1953: The Wild Geese
- 1955: Marital Relations
- 1956: The Legend of the White Serpent
- 1956: A Cat, Shozo, and Two Women

== Awards ==
- 1947: Mainichi Film Award for Best Cinematography (Once More)
- 1953: Blue Ribbon Award for Best Cinematography (Where Chimneys Are Seen, The Wild Geese and Aijō ni tsuite)
- 1956: Blue Ribbon Award for Best Cinematography and Mainichi Film Award for Best Cinematography (both for A Cat, Shozo, and Two Women and The Legend of the White Serpent)
