= Aru yo no Tonosama =

- Theatrical release poster
- Directed by: Teinosuke Kinugasa
- Starring: Kazuo Hasegawa; Isuzu Yamada; Hideko Takamine; Chōko Iida; Mitsuko Yoshikawa; Susumu Fujita; Denjirō Ōkōchi
- Production company: Toho
- Release date: 1946
- Country: Japan
- Language: Japanese

Aru yo no Tonosama (Japanese: 或る夜の殿様; lit. "Lord for a Night") is a 1946 Japanese film directed by Teinosuke Kinugasa.

== Cast ==
- Kazuo Hasegawa
- Isuzu Yamada
- Hideko Takamine
- Chōko Iida
- Mitsuko Yoshikawa
- Ichiro Sugai
- Tetsu Nakamura
- Takashi Shimura
- Eitarō Shindō
- Susumu Fujita
- Denjirō Ōkōchi

== Awards ==
1st Mainichi Film Award

- Won: Best Film
