= Hideko Takamine =

Japanese actress (1924–2010)

- 高峰 秀子
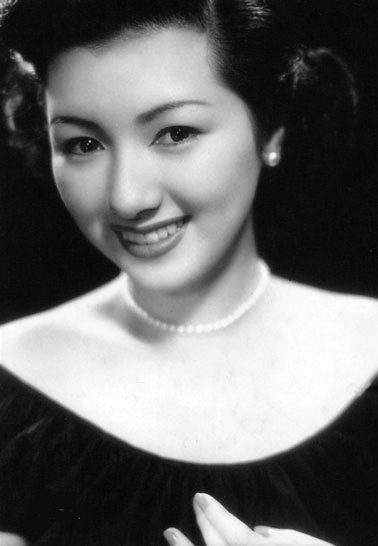
- Hideko Takamine in the late 1940s
- Born: Hideko Hirayama; March 27, 1924; Hakodate, Hokkaido, Japanese Empire
- Died: December 28, 2010 (aged 86); Tokyo, Japan
- Occupation: Actress
- Years active: 1929–1979
- Spouse: Zenzo Matsuyama (m. 1955)

Hideko Takamine (高峰 秀子, Takamine Hideko; March 27, 1924 – December 28, 2010) was a Japanese actress who began as a child actress and maintained her fame in a career that spanned 50 years. She is particularly known for her collaborations with directors Mikio Naruse and Keisuke Kinoshita, with Twenty-Four Eyes (1954) and Floating Clouds (1955) being among her most noted films.

== Biography ==
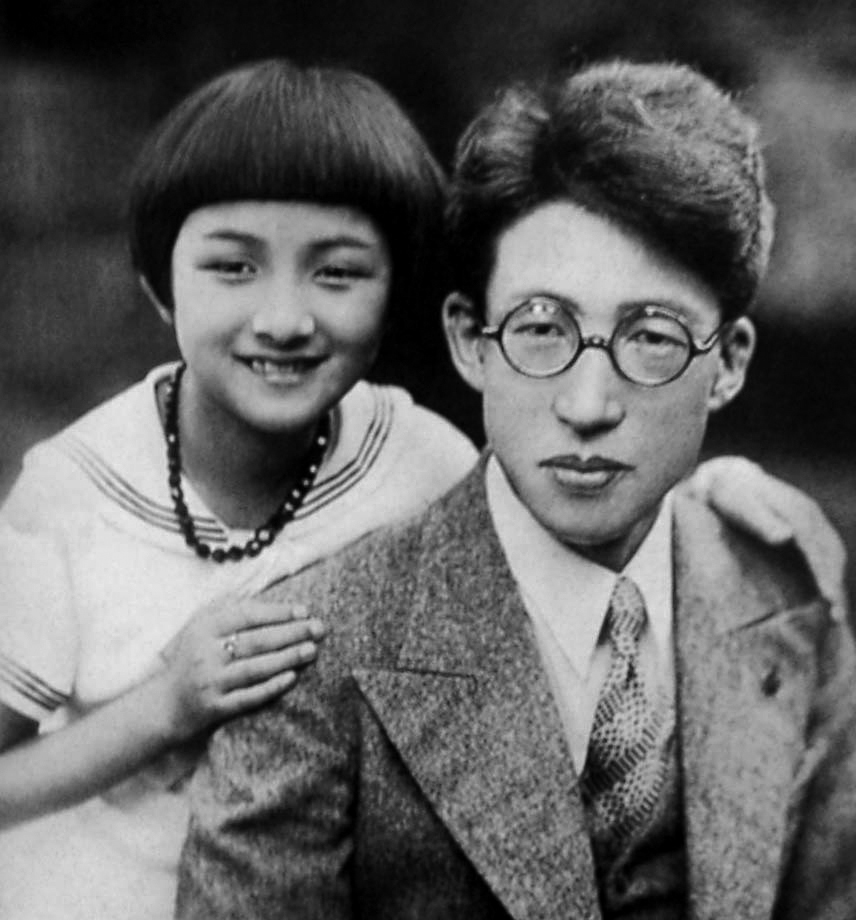
Takamine and singer Taro Shoji in 1934

Takamine was born in Hakodate, Hokkaidō, in 1924. At the age of four, following the death of her mother, she was placed in the care of her aunt in Tokyo. Her first role was in the Shochiku studio's 1929 film Mother (Haha), which brought her tremendous popularity as a child actor. Many of the films of her early career were imitations of Shirley Temple films.

After moving to the Toho studio in 1937, her dramatic roles in Kajirō Yamamoto's Tsuzurikata kyōshitsu (1938) and Horse (1941) brought her added fame as a girl star. She toured as a singer to entertain Japanese troops and, after the war, sang for American occupation troops in Tokyo. After initially appearing in a pro-union film, Those Who Make Tomorrow (1946), she became appalled by the rigid attitudes of the union's leaders and members and, during the post-war Toho strikes, joined a new union along with nine of Toho's major stars, which went on to form the new Shintoho studio in 1947.

In 1950, she left Shintoho and became a freelance actress. Her films with directors Keisuke Kinoshita and Mikio Naruse during the 1950s made her Japan's top star. Notable films of this decade include Kinoshita's satirical comedy Carmen Comes Home (1951), Japan's first feature length colour film, and the antiwar drama Twenty-Four Eyes (1954), and Naruse's Floating Clouds (1955) and When a Woman Ascends the Stairs (1960).

She was especially favoured as leading actress by Naruse, appearing in 17 of his films between 1941 and 1966, which are considered "some of her finest performances" (Jasper Sharp), with her "sensitive yet resourceful persona" proving ideal for "Naruse's suffering, persevering heroines" (Alexander Jacoby). Film historian Donald Richie described the characters she portrayed as follows: "Like so many Japanese women then, they wanted more out of life, but couldn’t get it. The war may have been over, women found, but they weren’t better off. They were still fairly unhappy. So the kind of roles Takamine played fit the zeitgeist, may have even made that zeitgeist." Comparing Naruse and Kinoshita, Takamine explained: "Though different in style, they shared a common aversion to things that were not natural. What I tried to do was to be as natural as women we see in the news, but adding a touch of drama so that I would be even more real."

She married writer-director Zenzo Matsuyama in 1955, but continued her acting career, stating that she wanted to "create a new style of wife who has a job". After retiring as an actress in 1979, she published her autobiography and several essay collections. She died of lung cancer on 28 December 2010 at the age of 86.

== Selected filmography ==
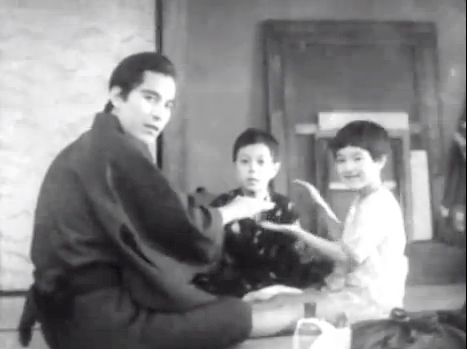
Tokyo Chorus (1931) From left to right, Tokihiko Okada, Hideo Sugawara and Hideko

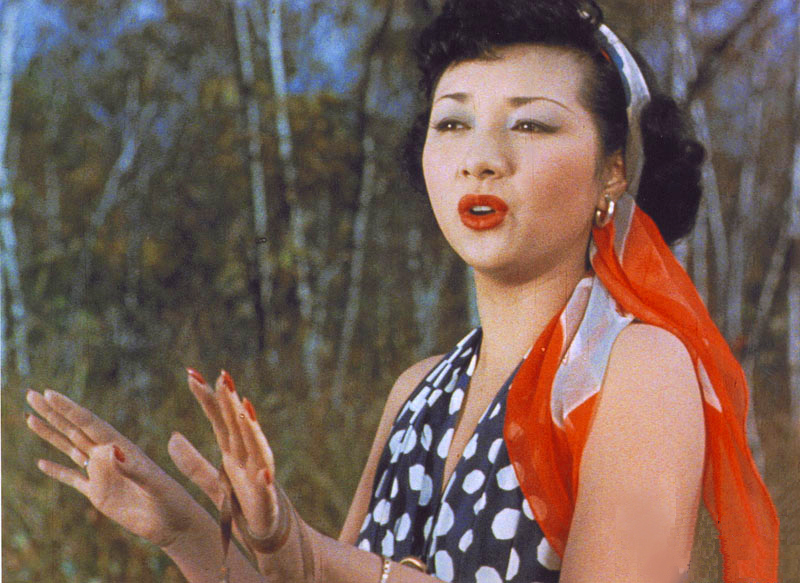
Carmen Comes Home (1951)

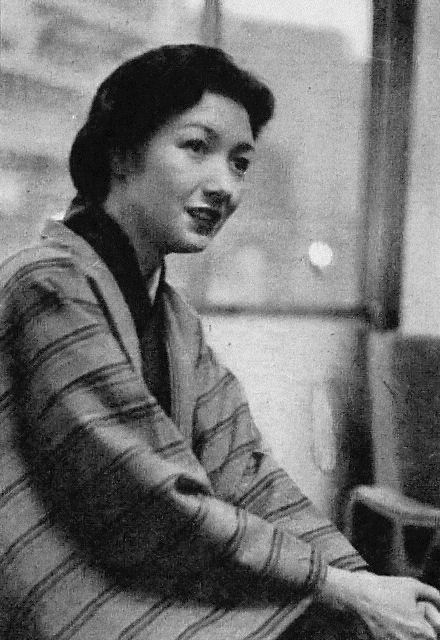
Takamine in 1954

Year	Title	Role	Director(s)	Notes
1929	Mother		Hōtei Nomura	Film debut
1931	Tokyo Chorus		Yasujirō Ozu	
1938	Tsuzurikata kyōshitsu		Kajirō Yamamoto	
1938	Niji tatsu oka	Yuri	Toshio Ōtani	
1941	Hideko the Bus Conductor	Okoma	Mikio Naruse	First film with Naruse
1941	Horse		Kajirō Yamamoto	
1943	Ahen senso		Masahiro Makino	
1946	Those Who Make Tomorrow	Takamine	Akira Kurosawa; Hideo Sekigawa; Kajirō Yamamoto	
1946	Aru yo no tonosama		Teinosuke Kinugasa	
1949	Ginza kankan musume		Koji Shima	
1950	The Munekata Sisters		Yasujirō Ozu	
1951	Carmen Comes Home	Okin alias Lily Carmen	Keisuke Kinoshita	First film with Kinoshita
1951	Home Sweet Home		Noboru Nakamura	
1952	Lightning		Mikio Naruse	
1952	Carmen's Pure Love	Carmen	Keisuke Kinoshita	
1953	Where Chimneys Are Seen		Heinosuke Gosho	
1953	The Wild Geese	Otama	Shirō Toyoda	
1954	The Garden of Women	Yoshie Izushi	Keisuke Kinoshita	
1954	Twenty-Four Eyes	Hisako Ōishi	Keisuke Kinoshita	
1954	Somewhere Beneath the Wide Sky		Masaki Kobayashi	
1955	Floating Clouds		Mikio Naruse	
1956	Nagareru		Mikio Naruse	
1956	A Wife's Heart		Mikio Naruse	
1957	Untamed		Mikio Naruse	
1957	Times of Joy and Sorrow	Kiyoko Arisawa	Keisuke Kinoshita	
1958	Rickshaw Man	Yoshiko Yoshioka	Hiroshi Inagaki	
1960	When a Woman Ascends the Stairs	Keiko Yashiro	Mikio Naruse	
1960	Daughters, Wives and a Mother		Mikio Naruse	
1960	The River Fuefuki	Okei	Keisuke Kinoshita	
1961	As a Wife, As a Woman	Miho Nishigaki	Mikio Naruse	
1961	Happiness of Us Alone	Akiko Katayama	Zenzo Matsuyama	
1961	The Human Condition: A Soldier's Prayer		Masaki Kobayashi	
1961	Immortal Love		Keisuke Kinoshita	
1962	Burari bura-bura monogatari		Zenzo Matsuyama	
1962	A Wanderer's Notebook		Mikio Naruse	
1963	A Woman's Story		Mikio Naruse	
1964	Yearning	Reiko Morita	Mikio Naruse	
1967	The Doctor's Wife		Yasuzo Masumura	
1973	The Twilight Years		Shirō Toyoda	
1979	Oh, My Son!		Keisuke Kinoshita	Final film

== Awards ==
Japan Academy Film Prize

- 1996 Lifetime Achievement Award

Mainichi Film Concours for Best Actress

- 1955 Twenty-Four Eyes, Garden of Women, Somewhere Beneath the Wide Sky
- 1956 Floating Clouds
- 1958 Times of Joy and Sorrow, Untamed
- 1962 Immortal Love, Happiness of Us Alone

Blue Ribbon Award for Best Actress

- 1955 Twenty-Four Eyes, Garden of Women, Somewhere Beneath the Wide Sky

Kinema Junpo Award for Best Actress

- 1956 Floating Clouds
