= No Blood Relation =

1932 Japanese film

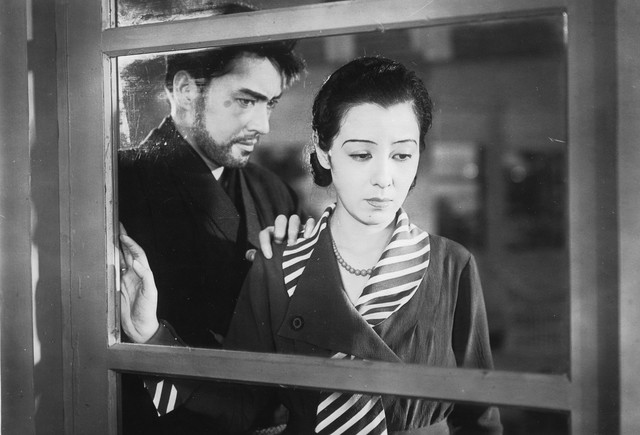
- Jōji Oka and Yoshiko Okada

Japanese name
- Kanji: 生さぬ仲
- Directed by: Mikio Naruse
- Written by: Kogo Noda; Shunyo Yanagawa (novel)
- Starring: Yoshiko Okada; Shin'yō Nara; Yukiko Tsukuba
- Cinematography: Suketaro Inokai
- Production company: Shochiku
- Distributed by: Shochiku
- Release date: 16 December 1932 (Japan)
- Running time: 79 minutes
- Country: Japan
- Language: Japanese

No Blood Relation (生さぬ仲, Nasanu naka) is a 1932 Japanese silent drama film directed by Mikio Naruse, based on a novel by Shunyo Yanagawa. It is the earliest surviving feature-length film by the director.

== Plot ==
After five years overseas, star actress Tamae returns to Japan to reunite with her daughter Shigeko, whom she left behind with her then husband Atsumi in favour of her career. In her absence, Atsumi has married again, and the bond between Shigeko and her stepmother Masako has grown as strong as between a blood-related child and mother. When Atsumi's company goes bankrupt and his family is forced to move to lower-class surroundings, Tamae sees her chance to lure Shigeko away, but eventually has to accept that her wealth cannot compensate for Shigeko's and Masako's mutual love.

== Cast ==
- Yoshiko Okada as Tamae Kiyooka, Atsumi's former wife
- Shin'yō Nara as Shunsaku Atsumi
- Yukiko Tsukuba as Masako, Atsumi's wife
- Toshiko Kojima as Shigeko, Atsumi's daughter
- Fumiko Katsuragi as Kishiyo, Atsumi's mother
- Jōji Oka as Masaya Kusakabe, Atsumi's friend
- Ichirō Yūki as Keiji Makino, Tamae's criminal brother
- Shozaburo Abe as "Gen the Pelican"
- Kōji Mitsui as sake delivery cyclist (uncredited)

== Analysis ==
Naruse biographer Catherine Russell linked No Blood Relation to other Naruse films of the same era like Three Sisters With Maiden Hearts, Wife! Be Like a Rose! and The Girl in the Rumor, by using the popular but controversial figure of the moga (modern Japanese girl with Western values and Western fashion style) as a contrast with another woman.

== Legacy ==
No Blood Relation was screened at the Cinémathèque Française in 2006 and at the Berlin International Film Festival in 2007 in its "Retrospektive" program.
