= Lightning (1952 film) =

1952 Japanese film

Lightning 稲妻 Inazuma
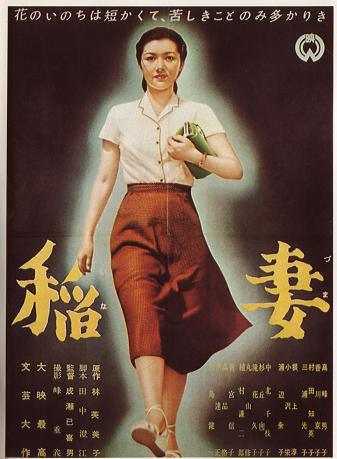
- Japanese movie poster
- Directed by: Mikio Naruse
- Written by: Sumie Tanaka; Fumiko Hayashi (novel)
- Starring: Hideko Takamine; Mitsuko Miura; Chieko Nakakita
- Cinematography: Shigeyoshi Mine
- Edited by: Toyo Suzuki
- Music by: Ichirō Saitō
- Production company: Daiei Film
- Distributed by: Daiei Film
- Release date: 9 October 1952 (Japan)
- Running time: 87 minutes
- Country: Japan
- Language: Japanese

Lightning (Japanese: 稲妻, Hepburn: Inazuma) is a 1952 Japanese drama film directed by Mikio Naruse, and starring Hideko Takamine. It is based on the 1936 novel by Fumiko Hayashi and was the second in a series of adaptations of Hayashi's work by Naruse after the 1951 Repast.

== Plot ==
23-year-old Kiyoko works as a tour guide in Tokyo. Like her single mother and her three older siblings, all from different fathers, she lives in the city's Shitamachi area. From her siblings, Kiyoko is closest to her sister Mitsuko, who runs a clothing store with her husband Rohei. Her brother Kasuke is an unemployed war veteran, who wastes his time in pachinko arcades. Her oldest sister, Nuiko, has her husband, Ryuzo, invest in a hotel enterprise with baker Tsunakichi, who secretly is Nuiko's lover. Nuiko pushes Kiyoko to date Tsunakichi, and even slaps Kiyoko when she refuses to see him. When Rohei dies, his mistress Ritsu approaches Mitsuko and claims a share from Rohei's life insurance because he is the father of her newborn child. Also Nuiko, Kasuke, and the mother want to borrow money from Mitsuko for their own pursuits. Mitsuko eventually decides to use the money partly for Ritsu's demands and for opening up her own coffee shop.

Kiyoko becomes frustrated with the tensions in her family and moves out into a flat of her own. She becomes acquainted with Shuzo and Tsubomi, a brother and sister her age living next door, and Kiyoko and Shuzo slowly develop an interest in each other. During a visit to Mitsuko's new café, Kiyoko is repelled to see that Tsunakichi is now involved in her sister's business as well as possibly her lover and has to fight off his obtrusive advances. When her mother comes to look for the missing Mitsuko at Kiyoko's place, they have an argument about the many fathers Kiyoko grew up with and start crying, while a thunderstorm passes by. Afterwards, Kiyoko offers to buy her mother new summer clothes and walks her home.

== Cast ==
- Hideko Takamine as Kiyoko
- Mitsuko Miura as Mitsuko
- Chieko Murata as Nuiko
- Chieko Nakakita as Ritsu
- Kenzaburo Uemura as Ryuzo
- Kyōko Kagawa as Tsubomi
- Jun Negami as Shuzo
- Sakae Ozawa as Tsunakichi
- Maruyama Osa as Kasuke
- Kumeko Urabe as the mother Osei

== Reception ==
Film historian Donald Richie called Lightning an "almost perfect realization of Fumiko Hayashi's novel" and "a balanced union of literature and cinema".

== Legacy ==
Lightning was screened at the Museum of Modern Art in 1985 and at the Harvard Film Archive in 2005 as part of their retrospectives on Mikio Naruse.

== Awards ==
- Blue Ribbon Awards for Best Film, Best Director (Mikio Naruse) and Best Supporting Actress (Chieko Nakakita)
- Mainichi Film Awards for the Best Film Score (Ichirō Saitō) and Best Supporting Actress (Chieko Nakakita)
