= Mitsuko Yoshikawa =

Japanese actress (1901–1991)

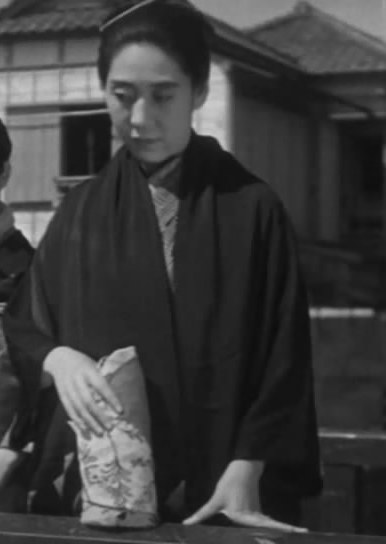
- Mitsuko Yoshikawa in Apart From You
- Born: 21 June 1901; Tokyo, Japan
- Died: 8 August 1991 (aged 90); Tokyo, Japan
- Occupation: Actress
- Years active: 1926-1984

Mitsuko Yoshikawa (吉川 満子, Yoshikawa Mitsuko; 21 June 1901 – 8 August 1991) was a Japanese actress who played in over 250 films, often under the direction of Yasujirō Ozu and Hiroshi Shimizu.

She joined the Shochiku film studios in 1924 and gave her film debut in 1926 in Kujaku no hikari. After the war, she became a freelancer and, besides working for Shochiku, appeared in productions of Toho, Shintoho, Daiei and other studios She gave her final performance in 1984 in Juzo Itami's The Funeral.

== Selected filmography ==
- 1926: Kujaku no hikari (dir. Jirō Yoshino)
- 1930: Story of Kinuyo (dir. Heinosuke Gosho)
- 1932: I Was Born, But... (dir. Yasujirō Ozu)
- 1933: Apart From You (dir. Mikio Naruse)
- 1933: Every-Night Dreams (dir. Mikio Naruse)
- 1934: A Mother Should Be Loved (dir. Yasujirō Ozu)
- 1934: Eclipse (dir. Hiroshi Shimizu)
- 1935: Burden of Life (dir. Heinosuke Gosho)
- 1936: The Only Son (dir. Yasujirō Ozu)
- 1936: The New Road (Part one) (dir. Heinosuke Gosho)
- 1937: What Did the Lady Forget? (dir. Yasujirō Ozu)
- 1937: Children in the Wind (dir. Hiroshi Shimizu)
- 1941: Brothers and Sisters of the Toda Family (dir. Yasujirō Ozu)
- 1941: Introspection Tower (dir. Hiroshi Shimizu)
- 1946: Aru yo no Tonosama (dir. Teinosuke Kinugasa)
- 1947: Record of a Tenement Gentleman (dir. Yasujirō Ozu)
- 1950: Akogare no Hawaii Kōro (dir. Torajirō Saitō)
- 1950: Wedding Ring (dir. Keisuke Kinoshita)
- 1955: Growing Up (dir. Heinosuke Gosho)
- 1962: Akitsu Springs (dir. Yoshishige Yoshida)
- 1984: The Funeral (dir. Juzo Itami)
