= The Whole Family Works =

1939 Japanese film

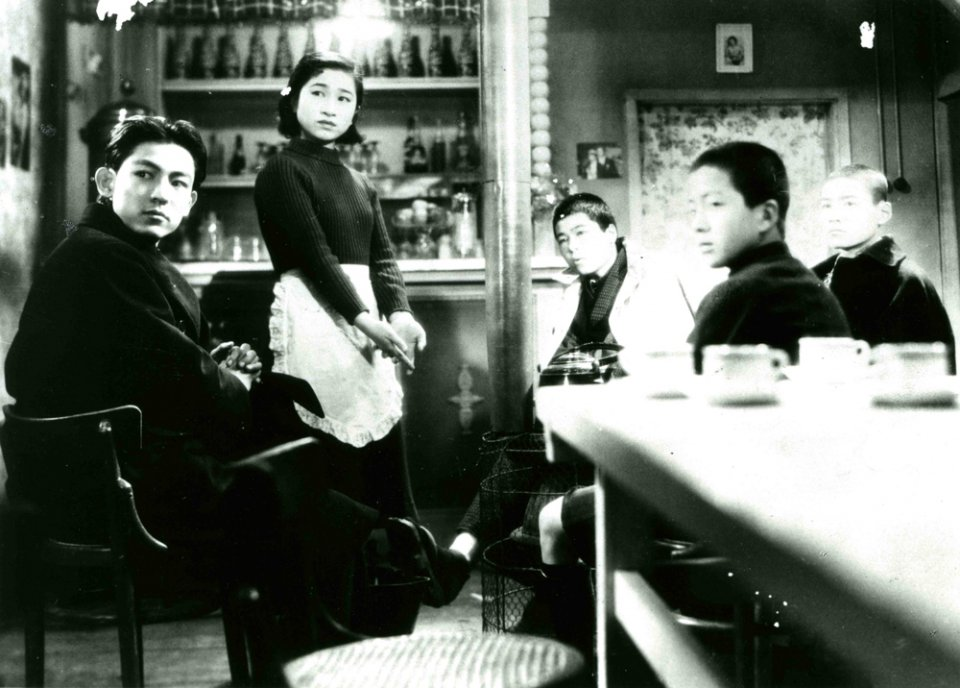

Japanese name
- Kanji: はたらく一家
- Directed by: Mikio Naruse
- Written by: Mikio Naruse; Sunao Tokunaga (novel)
- Produced by: Masanobu Takeyama
- Starring: Musei Tokugawa; Noriko Honma; Akira Ubukata
- Cinematography: Hiroshi Suzuki
- Edited by: Kōichi Iwashita
- Music by: Tadashi Ota
- Production company: Toho
- Distributed by: Toho
- Release date: 11 March 1939 (Japan)
- Running time: 65 minutes
- Country: Japan
- Language: Japanese

The Whole Family Works (Japanese: はたらく一家, romanized: Hataraku ikka) is a 1939 Japanese drama film written and directed by Mikio Naruse. It is based on a novel by Sunao Tokunaga.

== Plot ==
The working class Ishimura family, living on the brink of poverty, depends on the salaries of the father and his three eldest sons, Kiichi, Genji and Noboru, who became factory workers immediately after elementary school. Kiichi sees no prospect of a promotion or salary raise at his job, meaning he could never support a family of his own, and expresses his wish to go to a higher school. While his mother objects against his plan, which would result in a decrease of the family's income, his father is torn between financial necessity and his son's happiness. Mr. Ishimura consults teacher Ogawa, explaining that if he allows Kiichi to follow his ambitions, he would have to allow his other sons the same. During a family meeting, moderated by Ogawa, Mr. Ishimura announces that he will accept his sons' decisions. While Kiichi assures Ogawa that he will work hard, and his younger brothers rejoice, the parents appear worried.

== Cast ==
- Musei Tokugawa as Mr. Ishimura
- Noriko Honma as Mrs. Ishimura
- Akira Ubukata as Kiichi
- Kaoru Itō as Genji
- Seikichi Minami as Noboru
- Takeshi Hirata as Eisaku
- Den Ohinata as Ogawa, the teacher
- Sumie Tsubaki as Mitsuko

== Legacy ==
Naruse biographer Catherine Russell cites The Whole Family Works, together with his 1939 Sincerity, as the director's two key films of this period and the "link between Naruse's prewar and postwar shoshimin-eiga".

The film was shown in the U.S. as part of a Naruse retrospective in 1985, organised by the Kawakita Memorial Film Institute and film scholar Audie Bock.
