= Kamatari Fujiwara =

Japanese actor (1905–1985)

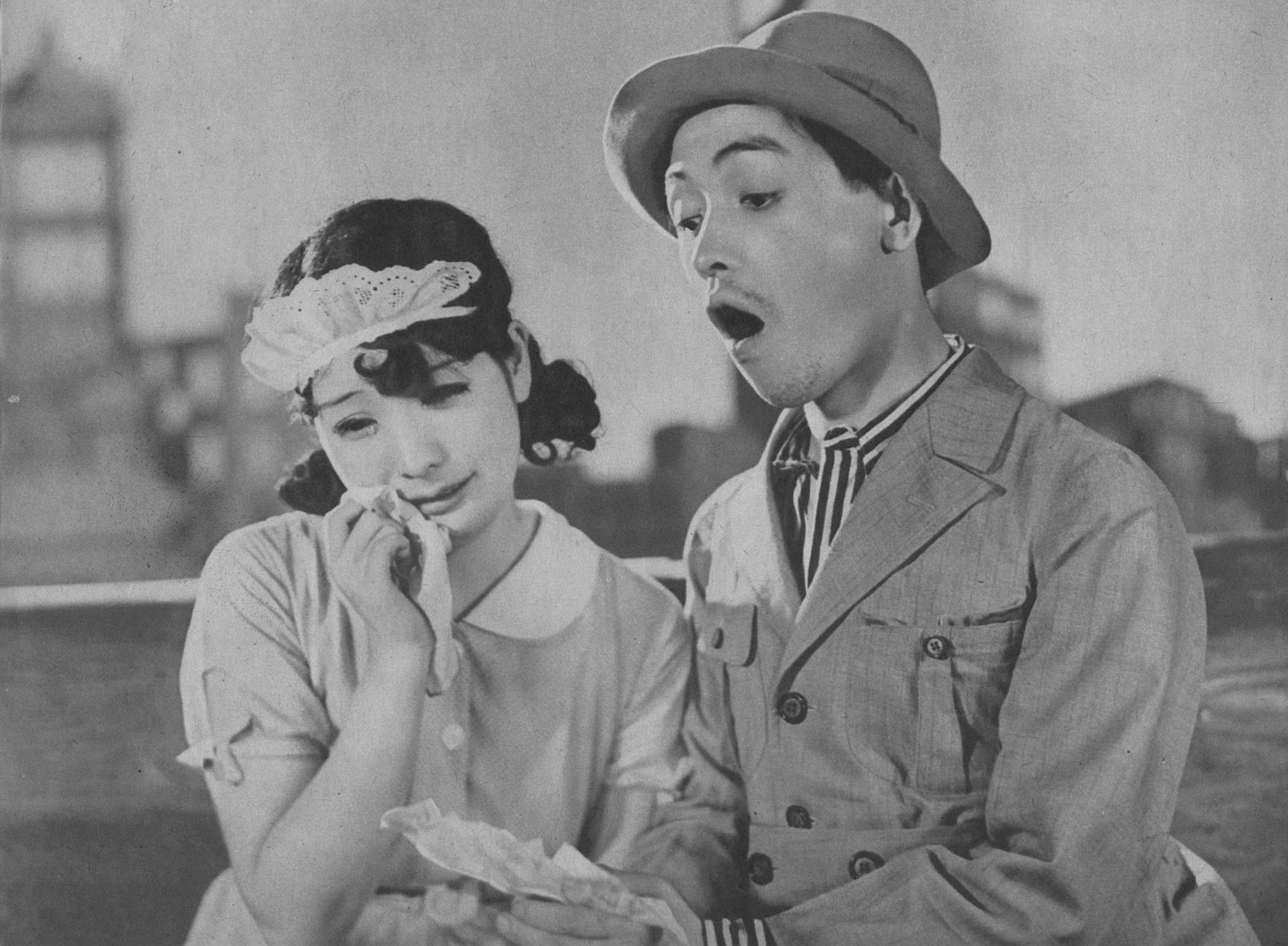
- Fujiwara (right) in a still photo for the film Ongaku Kigeki – Horoyui Jinsei (1933)
- Born: Shigeo Yasui; 15 January 1905; Tokyo, Japan
- Died: 21 December 1985 (aged 80)
- Other name: Keita Fujiwara
- Occupation: Actor
- Years active: 1933–1984
- Spouses: Sadako Sawamura; (m. 1936–1946)

Shigeo Yasui (安惠 重男, Yasui Shigeo; 15 January 1905 – 21 December 1985), better known by his stage name Kamatari Fujiwara (藤原釜足, Fujiwara Kamatari) and also known during wartime as Keita Fujiwara (藤原 鶏太, Fujiwara Keita), was a Japanese stage and film actor who appeared in over 200 films between 1933 and 1984. In addition to regular appearances in the films of Akira Kurosawa, he worked for directors such as Mikio Naruse, Yasujirō Ozu, Heinosuke Gosho and others.

== Early life and career ==
Fujiwara was born Shigeo Yasui on 15 January 1905 in Tokyo, Japan. Fujiwara had initially focused on music before he became known as a comic actor. After performing in Asakusa operas, a popular form of opera during the Taishō era until its decline after the Great Kantō earthquake, he joined Ken'ichi Enomoto's New Casino Folies. Enomoto's troupe performed satirical stage shows in an era often associated with the term ero guro nansensu or "Erotic Grotesque Nonsense" era.

Fujiwara gave his film debut in the 1933 film Ongaku kigeki – Horoyui jinsei (lit. "Musical comedy – Intoxicated life"), the first production of the P.C.L. studios (later Toho). Most of Fujiwara's later films were Toho productions. He married actress Sadako Sawamura in 1936 (divorced in 1946). In the late 1930s, Fujiwara found himself in trouble with the nationalist government. The authorities were pushing for artists and high-profile individuals to change their names to the traditional spelling, and he was under official censure to do so. Despite this, he kept his name.

== Post-war career ==
Fujiwara's shomin persona always was that of a real-life person. Generally he played the role of an ordinary subject-citizen: petty, conservative, mediocre, far from being handsome or rich. Over time he made this his specialty.

He made his first appearance in an Akira Kurosawa film in the 1952 Ikiru, playing the role of Senkichi, and became a long-time member of Kurosawa's company of actors until his death. Other films with Kurosawa include Seven Samurai, The Lower Depths, The Hidden Fortress and Yojimbo. In addition to Kurosawa, Fujiwara regularly appeared in the films of Mikio Naruse, with whom he had worked since the mid-1930s in films like Wife! Be Like a Rose!, and had roles in Heinosuke Gosho's An Inn at Osaka and Yasujirō Ozu's Tokyo Twilight. He also started appearing on TV in the 1950s, including the series Ayu no uta.

In 1981, Fujiwara received the Order of the Sacred Treasure, 4th Class. His final film role was in Juzo Itami's The Funeral. He died in 1985 at the age of 80.

== Legacy ==
The peasant duo in Kurosawa's The Hidden Fortress, played by Minoru Chiaki and Fujiwara, has repeatedly been cited as inspiration for the robot characters C-3PO and R2-D2 in Star Wars.

== Selected filmography ==
- Ongaku Kigeki – Horoyui Jinsei (1933)
- Wife! Be Like a Rose! (1935, directed by Mikio Naruse)
- The Girl in the Rumor (1935, directed by Mikio Naruse)
- Tsuruhachi and Tsurujiro (1938, directed by Mikio Naruse)
- Chocolate and Soldiers (1938, directed by Takeshi Satō)
- Travelling Actors (1940, directed by Mikio Naruse)
- Horse (1941, directed by Kajirō Yamamoto)
- Hideko the Bus Conductor (1941, directed by Mikio Naruse)
- Blue Mountains (1949, directed by Tadashi Imai)
- Conduct Report on Professor Ishinaka (1950, directed by Mikio Naruse)
- The Munekata Sisters (1950, directed by Yasujirō Ozu)
- Nangoku no hada (1952, directed by Ishirō Honda)
- Ikiru (1952, directed by Akira Kurosawa)
- Husband and Wife (1953, directed by Mikio Naruse)
- The Invisible Avenger (1954, directed by Motoyoshi Oda)
- The Seven Samurai (1954, directed by Akira Kurosawa)
- An Inn at Osaka (1954, directed by Heinosuke Gosho)
- Dobu (1954, directed by Kaneto Shindō)
- I Live in Fear (1955, directed by Akira Kurosawa)
- The Lone Journey (1955, directed by Hiroshi Inagaki)
- Romantic Daughters (1956, directed by Toshio Sugie)
- Tokyo Twilight (1957, directed by Yasujirō Ozu)
- The Lower Depths (1957, directed by Akira Kurosawa)
- Stakeout (1958, dir. Yoshitarō Nomura)
- The Hidden Fortress (1958, directed by Akira Kurosawa)
- Life of an Expert Swordsman (1959, directed by Hiroshi Inagaki)
- The Sun's Burial (1960, directed by Nagisa Oshima)
- The Bad Sleep Well (1960, directed by Akira Kurosawa)
- The Approach of Autumn (1960, directed by Mikio Naruse)
- Yojimbo (1961, directed by Akira Kurosawa)
- Sanjuro (1962, directed by Akira Kurosawa)
- High and Low (1963, directed by Akira Kurosawa)
- A Woman's Life (1963, directed by Mikio Naruse)
- Red Beard (1965, directed by Akira Kurosawa)
- Mickey One (1965, directed by Arthur Penn)
- Taking The Castle (1965, directed by Toshio Masuda)
- The Sword of Doom (1966, directed by Kihachi Okamoto)
- The River of Tears (1967, directed by Kenji Misumi)
- Double Suicide (1969, directed by Masahiro Shinoda)
- Dodeskaden (1970, directed by Akira Kurosawa)
- Battle of Okinawa (1971, directed by Kihachi Okamoto)
- Kagemusha (directed by Akira Kurosawa, 1980)
- Sailor Suit and Machine Gun (1981, directed by Shinji Somai)
- W's Tragedy (1984, directed by Shinichiro Sawai)
- The Funeral (1984, directed by Juzo Itami)
