= Noriko Honma =

Japanese actress (1911–2009)

Noriko Honma 本間文子
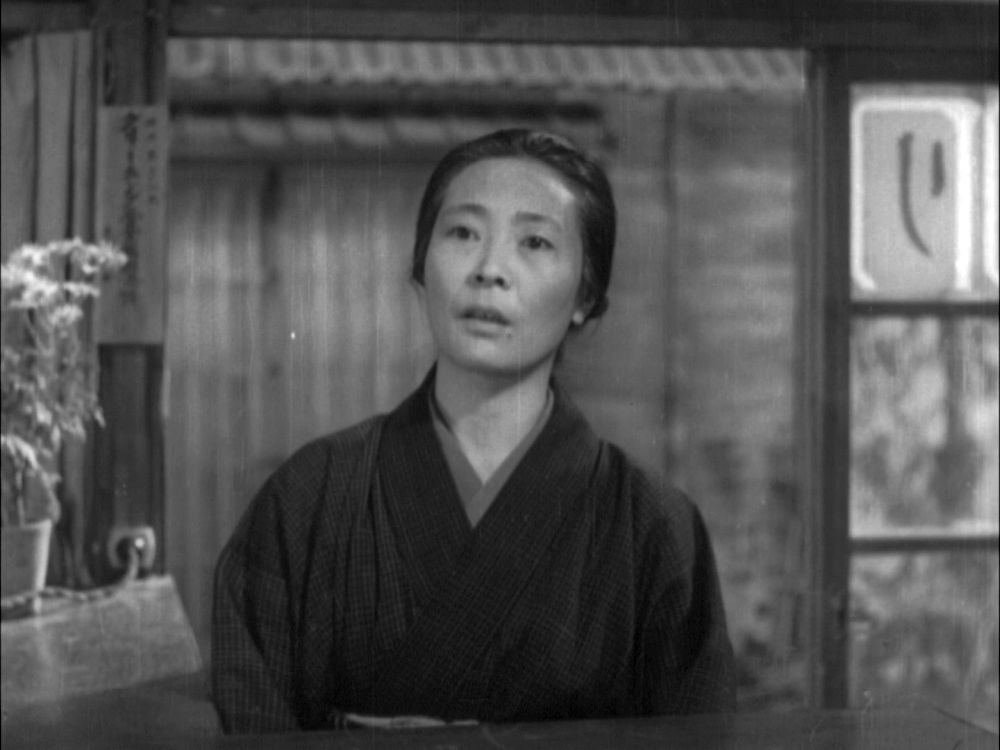
- Noriko Honma in Okaasan (おかあさん) directed by Mikio Naruse, 1952
- Born: 29 November 1911; Yubari, Hokkaidō, Japan
- Died: 12 April 2009 (aged 97); Tokyo, Japan
- Occupation: Actress
- Years active: 1933–1993

Noriko Honma (本間文子 Honma Noriko) (29 November 1911 – 12 April 2009) was a Japanese actress whose film work occurred primarily during the 1950s. She was born in Hokkaido. She worked in many of Akira Kurosawa's films, first appearing in Kurosawa's Stray Dog, then in Rashomon as the Miko, also in Ikiru, The Seven Samurai, Akahige, and Dreams. Noriko died in April 2009 at the age of 97.

== Partial filmography ==
- Tsuzurikata Kyoshitsu (1938) - Mrs. Tanno
- The Whole Family Works (1939) - Mrs. Ishimura
- Stray Dog (1949) - Woman of wooden tub shop
- Sasameyuki (1950) - Itakura's mother
- Rashomon (1950) - Miko
- Mizuiro no waltz (1952) - Ms. Omachi
- Atakake no hitobito (1952)
- Mother (1952) - Mino Hirai
- Ikiru (1952) - Housewife
- Fūfu (1953)
- Where Chimneys Are Seen (1953)
- Tsuma (1953)
- Haha to Musume (1953)
- Botchan (1953) - Uranari's mother
- Ani imōto (1953)
- Amongst the Girls in the Flowers (1953) - Yone Ishii
- Seven Samurai (1954) - Woman Farmer #1
- Shiosai (1954) - Old Woman of O-Haru
- Wakaki hi no takuboku: Kumo wa tensai de aru (1954) - Katsuko, Takuboku's mother
- Izumi e no michi (1955)
- The Lone Journey (1955)
- Meoto zenzai (1955)
- I Live in Fear (1955) - Family member of workers (uncredited)
- Samurai III: Duel at Ganryu Island (1956)
- Tsuma no Kokoro (1956)
- People of Tokyo, Goodbye (1956) - Natsu, Chiyo's Mother
- Women in Prison (1956) - Natsu Tosaka, prisoner
- Arakure (1957)
- A Rainbow Plays in My Heart (1957) - Nanny
- Zokuzoku Ōban: Dotō hen (1957) - Hostess
- Onna de aru koto (1958) - Boutique Owner
- Kekkon no Subete (1958)
- Iwashi-gumo (1958)
- Daikaju Baran (1958) - Ken's Mom
- Yajikita dōchū sugoroku (1958)
- Ankokugai no Kaoyuku (1959)
- Kitsune to Tanuki (1959)
- Aruhi Watashi wa (1959) - The woman of the rooming house
- Kaitei kara kita onna (1959) - Nurse
- When a Woman Ascends the Stairs (1960)
- Yojimbo (1961) - Farmer's Ex-wife
- Fundoshi isha (1961) - Sugi
- Taiheiyō Sensō to Himeyuri Butai (1962)
- Varan the Unbelievable (1962) - Screaming Woman
- Gekkyū dorobo (1962)
- Aa bakudan (1964) - Matsuko - Shiitake's wife
- Red Beard (1965) - Resident
- Akogare (1966)
- Big Duel in the North (1966) - Spiritualist
- Namida gawa (1967) - Tea shop old woman
- Nihonkai Daikaisen (1969)
- The Wild Sea (1969)
- Kiki kaikai ore wa dareda?! (1969) - Fusa
- The Water Margin (1973, TV Series) - Lu Ta's Mother (1977)
- G.I. Samurai (1979) - Old Woman
- Dreams (1990)
- Rhapsody in August (1991) - Mourner
- Madadayo (1993) - Old lady holding a cat (uncredited) (final film role)
