= Flunky, Work Hard! =

1931 Japanese film

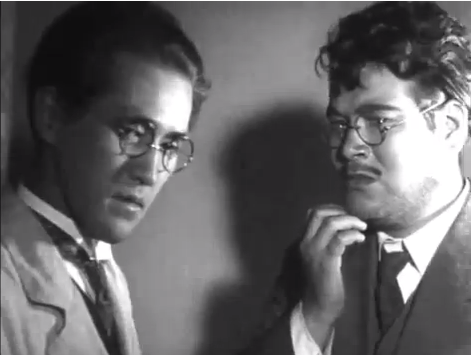

Japanese name
- Kanji: 腰弁頑張れ
- Directed by: Mikio Naruse
- Written by: Mikio Naruse
- Starring: Isamu Yamaguchi; Tomoko Naniwa; Seiichi Kato
- Cinematography: Mitsuo Miura
- Production company: Shochiku
- Distributed by: Shochiku
- Release date: 8 August 1931 (Japan)
- Running time: 29 minutes
- Country: Japan
- Language: Japanese

Flunky, Work Hard! (腰弁頑張れ, Koshiben ganbare) is a 1931 Japanese silent comedy drama film directed by Mikio Naruse, and the first surviving film by the director.

== Plot ==
Insurance salesman Okabe is scolded by his wife for their shortage of money and for always being behind with their rental payments. He promises that the situation will be better soon, as he is about to sell an insurance policy to Mrs. Toda, a wealthy neighbour. At Mrs. Toda's house, he gets into an argument with Nakamura, a competing salesman. As a result, Mrs. Toda throws both of them out. Meanwhile, Okabe's son Susumu gets into a fight with the neighbour's kids, including Mrs. Toda's son, for not letting him play with their toy airplane. Okabe, afraid that Mrs. Toda might sue him, scolds Susumu and comforts her son, taking him home. Mrs. Toda, who has heard that a child was hit by a train, is relieved by the sight of Okabe and her son and agrees to buy an insurance from him. Okabe decides to surprise Susumu and buys a toy airplane for him. Back home he learns that it was his own son who was hit by the train, and runs to the hospital. Susumu is in a critical condition, but finally recovers.

== Cast ==
- Isamu Yamaguchi as Okabe
- Tomoko Naniwa as Okabe's wife
- Seiichi Kato as Susumu, Okabe's son
- Shizue Akiyama as Mrs. Toda
- Tokio Seki as Nakamura
- Hideo Sugawara

== Release ==
Flunky, Work Hard! premiered in Japan on 8 August 1931. It was shown in the U.S. as part of a Naruse retrospective in 1985, organised by the Kawakita Memorial Film Institute and film scholar Audie Bock.

== Reception ==
Naruse biographer Catherine Russell called Flunky, Work Hard! a combination "of nansensu comedy, (Note: "Nansensu", the Japanese loanword for "nonsense", can refer to the silly or to the sarcastic and satirical.) tendency film, and shoshimin-eiga with a particularly flamboyant method of decoupage".
