= When a Woman Ascends the Stairs =

1960 Japanese film

- Theatrical release poster
- Directed by: Mikio Naruse
- Written by: Ryūzō Kikushima
- Produced by: Ryūzō Kikushima
- Starring: Hideko Takamine; Masayuki Mori; Daisuke Katō
- Cinematography: Masao Tamai
- Edited by: Eiji Ooi
- Music by: Toshiro Mayuzumi
- Production company: Toho
- Distributed by: Toho
- Release dates: 5 January 1960 (Japan); 25 June 1963 (U.S.)
- Running time: 111 min
- Country: Japan
- Language: Japanese

When a Woman Ascends the Stairs (Japanese: 女が階段を上る時, Hepburn: Onna ga kaidan o noboru toki) is a 1960 Japanese drama film directed by Mikio Naruse.

== Plot ==
Keiko (called "Mama" by the other characters), a young widow approaching 30, is a hostess at a bar in Ginza. Realizing she is getting older, she decides after talking to her bar manager, Komatsu, that she wants to open her own bar rather than remarrying and dishonoring her late husband to whose memory she is still devoted. To accomplish this, she must secure loans from some affluent patrons who frequent her bar, but has little success.

Meanwhile, Yuri, a former employee, has opened up her own bar nearby, consequently taking away most of Keiko's former customers. She scouts locations for her own bar with a confidant of her bar, Junko, undecided as to where she will open up. While Keiko has lunch with Yuri, whom she believes is doing well in her enterprise, Yuri reveals that she is deep in debt and cannot afford to pay off her creditors. She tells Keiko she plans to fake a suicide to keep her creditors at bay. Keiko is shocked to learn the next day that Yuri has actually died, and that she had either planned her death all along or had misjudged the amount of sleeping pills to take. She is shocked to see Yuri's creditors dunning her family for money while still in mourning.

After Keiko is diagnosed with a peptic ulcer, she retreats to her family's home to recover. It is revealed that she must give them money to keep her brother out of jail while also paying for an operation that her nephew, who was crippled by polio, needs in order to walk again. Keiko tells them she can not afford to give them money as she must keep up appearances with an expensive apartment and kimono but reluctantly agrees, realizing this will forestall any plan to open her own bar.

After Keiko returns to her bar to work, a man she briefly entertains proposes marriage to her. When he turns out to be a fraud, she sets her sights on Fujisaki, a businessman interested in her. Heartbroken over the fact that she got frauded, she gets drunk and when Fujisaki takes her to her apartment to sober up, he then pulls her onto the bed loudly claiming that he loves her and forces himself on her. The following morning, Keiko is laying wistfully on the bed, crying about her dead husband, she opens up to Fujisaki, believing that the sexual encounter to have changed their dynamic, she tells him she loves him. Feeling uncomfortable, he says he loves her too but then tells her he has been transferred to Osaka for work and can not abandon his family. As he leaves her apartment, Komatsu shows up through the open door just as Keiko is about to emotionally breakdown. Keiko is given a stern lecture by Komatsu, who claims he loves Keiko but has made no previous attempt to express this due to his respect for her reverence for her dead husband and her resolve not to have sex with other men. After berating her for losing her purity he slaps her when she defends herself. He then grabs Keiko's shoulders, pushing her close to him, loudly exclaiming that he loves her and asks her to marry him and open a new bar together. However, she is distraught and declines, saying that a marriage like this could not work since "they know each other too well". Still in love with Keiko, Komatsu quits the bar after she refuses his marriage proposal. Keiko returns again to work, ascending the stairs, pretending to be happy.

== Cast ==
- Hideko Takamine as Keiko Yashiro
- Masayuki Mori as Nobuhiko Fujisaki
- Reiko Dan as Junko Ichihashi
- Tatsuya Nakadai as Kenichi Komatsu, Keiko's manager
- Daisuke Katō as Matsukichi Sekine
- Nakamura Ganjirō II as Goda
- Eitarō Ozawa as Minobe
- Keiko Awaji as Yuri
- Kyū Sazanka as Bar owner
- Noriko Sengoku as Fortune-teller
- Chieko Nakakita as Tomoko
- Natsuko Kahara as Keiko's mother

== Legacy ==
When a Woman Ascends the Stairs was screened at the Berkeley Art Museum and Pacific Film Archive in 1981, the Museum of Modern Art in 1985 the Harvard Film Archive in 2005, and the Japan Society and Metrograph in 2025 as part of their retrospectives on Mikio Naruse.

== Home media ==
In 2007, When a Woman Ascends the Stairs was released on DVD by The Criterion Collection and the British Film Institute on region 1 and region 2 discs, respectively.
