= Hideko the Bus Conductor =

1941 Japanese film

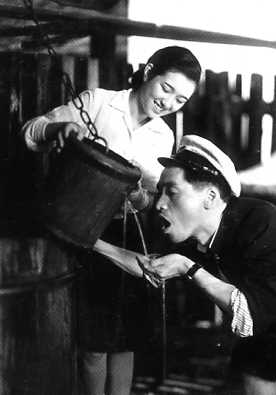

Japanese name
- Kanji: 秀子の車掌さん
- Directed by: Mikio Naruse
- Written by: Mikio Naruse; Masuji Ibuse (novella)
- Produced by: Sanezumi Fujimoto
- Starring: Hideko Takamine; Kamatari Fujiwara; Daijirō Natsukawa
- Cinematography: Ken Azuma
- Music by: Nobuo Iida
- Production company: Nan-ō Eiga
- Distributed by: Toho
- Release date: 17 September 1941 (Japan)
- Running time: 54 minutes
- Country: Japan
- Language: Japanese

Hideko the Bus Conductor (秀子の車掌さん, Hideko no shashō-san), also titled Hideko the Bus Conductress, is a 1941 Japanese comedy drama film written and directed by Mikio Naruse. It is based on the serialised novella Okoma-san by Masuji Ibuse and the first collaboration of Naruse and star Hideko Takamine.

== Plot ==
Okoma, a young lady working as a conductor with the Kohoku bus company in Kofu, Yamanashi, is worried about the dwindling number of passengers, who prefer the more expensive but clean and faster buses of the competing Kaihatsu company. After hearing a radio programme about bus guides, she develops the idea to entertain the passengers with informations about the local sites during the drive. After convincing the driver Sonoda and the company boss of her idea, she manages to get visiting writer Ikawa to write a script for her. Ikawa waives a payment because Okoma had found and returned his lost notebook. During the practice run, Okoma is hurt and the bus slightly damaged in an accident. The company boss tries to talk Sonoda into giving false testimony about the accident's circumstances to collect the insurance money, but Sonoda, after consulting Ikawa, finally rejects. Confronted with his foul attempt by Ikawa, the boss orders to have the bus cleaned instead. After waving Ikawa good-bye, Okoma and Sonoda give their initial guided bus tour, not knowing that the boss has sold the bus in the meantime and is closing down the company.

== Cast ==
- Hideko Takamine as Okoma
- Kamatari Fujiwara (credited Keita Fujiwara) as Sonoda
- Daijirō Natsukawa as Ikawa
- Tamae Kiyokawa as landlady
- Yotaro Katsumi as company boss
- Tsuruko Mano as Okama's mother

== Background ==
Hideko Takamine, in the principal role as Okoma, was already a famous film star for her childhood roles, and the title of the film refers to her name rather than that of the character which bears no first name in the original novella. Also, Naruse lightened the ending of Ibuse's story. This was the first film that Naruse made with Takamine, with sixteen more to follow between 1945 and 1966.

Naruse scholar Catherine Russell has described this film as "a remarkable film about a young woman 'coming out' as a professional, articulate, speaking subject."

== Legacy ==
Hideko the Bus Conductor was shown at the Museum of Modern Art in 1985 as part of its retrospective on Mikio Naruse, organised by the Kawakita Memorial Film Institute and film scholar Audie Bock.
