= Minoru Takase =

Japanese comedian and actor (1890–1947)

- 高勢実乗
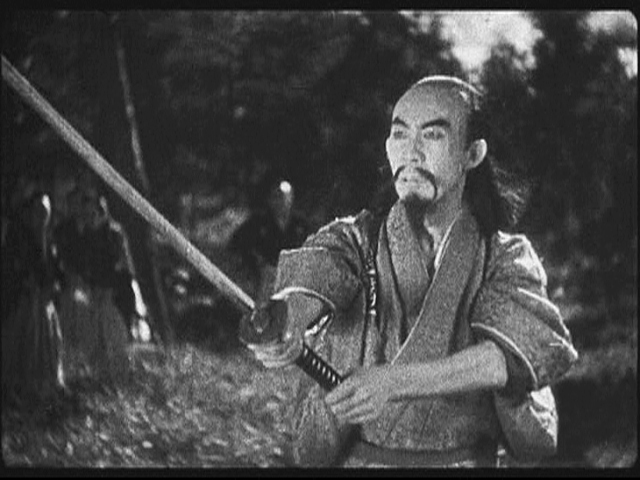
- Takase in Kokushi Musō (1932)
- Born: Shin'ichi Notoya; 13 December 1890; Hakodate, Hokkaido, Japan
- Died: 19 November 1947 (aged 56)
- Other name: Ippei Sōma
- Occupation: Actor

Minoru Takase (Japanese: 高勢実乗, Hepburn: Takase Minoru; 13 December 1890 – 19 November 1947) was a Japanese comedian and actor.

== Career ==
Born in Hakodate, Hokkaido, Takase moved to Tokyo in 1905 and began acting in shinpa theater. He started to appear in films after 1915, including Teinosuke Kinugasa's avant-garde film A Page of Madness (1926). When Kinugasa joined Shochiku, Takase followed him and appeared in many films starring Chōjirō Hayashi, as well as in Kinugasa's Crossroads (1928). He moved to Nikkatsu in 1928, often playing villains, but changed to comedy after appearing in Mansaku Itami's Kokushi Musō (1932). Sadao Yamanaka used him in such a role in The Million Ryo Pot (1935). After moving to Toho in 1937, his comic persona involved appearing in strange clothes and spouting odd phrases.

== Selected filmography ==
| Year | Title |
|---|---|
| 1926 | A Page of Madness |
| 1928 | Crossroads |
| 1931 | Oatsurae Jirokichi Koshi |
| 1932 | Kokushi Musō |
| 1935 | The Million Ryo Pot |
| 1940 | Travelling Actors |
