= The Legend of the White Serpent (film) =

1956 Japanese-Hong Kong film by Shiro Toyoda

- Film poster
- Directed by: Shirō Toyoda
- Screenplay by: Toshio Yasumi
- Produced by: Tomoyuki Tanaka; Run Run Shaw
- Starring: Ryō Ikebe; Kaoru Yachigusa; Yoshiko Yamaguchi; Nijiko Kiyokawa
- Cinematography: Mitsuo Miura
- Edited by: Kōichi Iwashita
- Music by: Ikuma Dan
- Production companies: Toho; Shaw Brothers
- Distributed by: Toho (Japan); Shaw Brothers (Hong Kong)
- Release dates: 22 June 1956 (Japan); 1957 (Hong Kong)
- Running time: 102 minutes
- Countries: Japan; Hong Kong
- Languages: Japanese; Mandarin; Cantonese

The Legend of the White Serpent (Japanese: 白夫人の妖恋, Hepburn: Byaku fujin no yōren; lit. 'The Love of Madame White') is a 1956 Japanese romantic fantasy film directed by Shirō Toyoda, with special effects by Eiji Tsuburaya. Adapted from the Chinese fairy tale Pai-she Chuan and the stories Story of a White Snake and White Woman's Magic by Fusao Hayashi, it stars Ryō Ikebe as Xu Xian, Shirley Yamaguchi as Bai-niang, and Kaoru Yachigusa as Xiao-qing. Set during the Song dynasty, the film follows Xu Xian, a young medicine shop apprentice, who becomes involved with Bai-niang, a mysterious woman with supernatural abilities. Their relationship leads to magical and moral conflicts involving villagers, a Taoist monk, and a local moneylender.

The film was released in Japan in 1956 and in the United States in 1965 as Madame White Snake. It won awards for cinematography and received international recognition at the Berlin International Film Festival.

== Plot ==
During the Song dynasty in Hangzhou, Xu Xian, an apprentice at his brother's medicine shop, encounters Bai-niang, a mysterious woman, and her companion Xiao-qing while traveling by ferry. After a chance meeting in which Xu Xian lends them his parasol during a rainstorm, he visits the Bai manor the next day to return it. Bai-niang, showing affection for him, gifts Xu Xian a red scarf and 500 pieces of silver, unaware that Xiao-qing has stolen the money from the local treasury on her mistress's orders. When the theft is discovered, Xu Xian's family and local officials confront him at the Bai manor, only to find it abandoned; Bai-niang vanishes in a cloud of smoke.

Xu Xian is sent to Suzhou to work under Wang Ming, an innkeeper and moneylender. Bai-niang and Xiao-qing appear as guests, and Xu Xian reunites with his mistress, beginning a romantic relationship. Meanwhile, tensions arise with Wang Ming, who attempts to exploit Bai-niang, but Xiao-qing intervenes to protect her mistress. Xu Xian encounters a Taoist monk from Mount Ji, who believes he is bewitched and provides talismans to protect him. Bai-niang instructs Xiao-qing to poison local waters so that Xu Xian's family can sell medicine to cure the sickness, prioritizing Xu Xian's happiness over moral concerns. When the monk tries to enforce the talismans, Bai-niang reverses their power, paralyzing him.

The Xian family sells their medicine to repay Wang Ming, and Bai-niang demonstrates her magical power by trapping the monk atop a temple steeple. Wang invites Xu Xian and the women to his manor to celebrate, intending to exploit Bai-niang with poisonous Realgar wine. During the celebration, Xiao-qing accidentally spills the wine on herself and transforms into a green snake. Bai-niang is forced to drink the wine and falls gravely ill, revealing her true form as a white snake. Xu Xian dies from fright, but Bai-niang petitions Heaven for magical grass to revive him. Though initially denied, the Bodhisattva intervenes, and Bai-niang relinquishes her power for his sake. Xu Xian awakens, with the monk taking credit for his revival, while Xiao-qing attempts to reveal the truth. Feeling betrayed, Xu Xian curses Bai-niang, and both he and the women go to the Gold Mountain temple.

At the temple, Bai-niang and Xiao-qing demonstrate their power by summoning a flood, forcing the monk to acknowledge Bai-niang's magical abilities. Bai-niang halts the spell to save Xu Xian, angering Xiao-qing, who abandons her mistress at the edge of the lake. On his journey home, Xu Xian encounters visions of Bai-niang and the white snake. Confronted by the high monk, he realizes his love for her and understands her true nature. Accepting her as she is, Xu Xian chooses to follow Bai-niang into Heaven. In the end, both Xu Xian and Bai-niang die together and ascend to Heaven, united in love.

== Cast ==
- Ryō Ikebe as Xu Xian, the young man
- Shirley Yamaguchi as Bai Niang (Madame White Snake)
- Kaoru Yachigusa as Xiao-Qing. Bai-niang's servant, a green snake
- Musei Tokugawa as the selfish Taoist monk
- Kichijiro Ueda as Wang Ming, the moneylender
- Nijiko Kiyokawa
- Haruo Tanaka
- Eijirō Tōno
- Yoshio Kosugi as leader of the guard
- Akira Tani
- Ikio Sawamura as a guardsman
- Bokuzen Hidari

== Release ==
The Legend of the White Serpent was distributed theatrically in Japan as Byaku fujin no yoren, where it received a roadshow theatrical release on 22 June 1956. The film was released in Hong Kong as Pai-she Chuan in 1956. The film was released in the United States as Madame White Snake by Toho International with English language subtitles in 1965.

== Reception ==
Mitsuo Miura won the award for Best Cinematography at the Mainichi Film Concours for the work done in The Legend of the White Serpent and Shozo, a Cat, and Two Women. At the 6th Berlin International Film Festival, it won the Honourable Mention (Colour) award.

== See also ==
- List of media adaptations of the Legend of the White Snake
- The White Snake Enchantress, a 1958 anime film
