= Wife! Be Like a Rose! =

1935 Japanese film

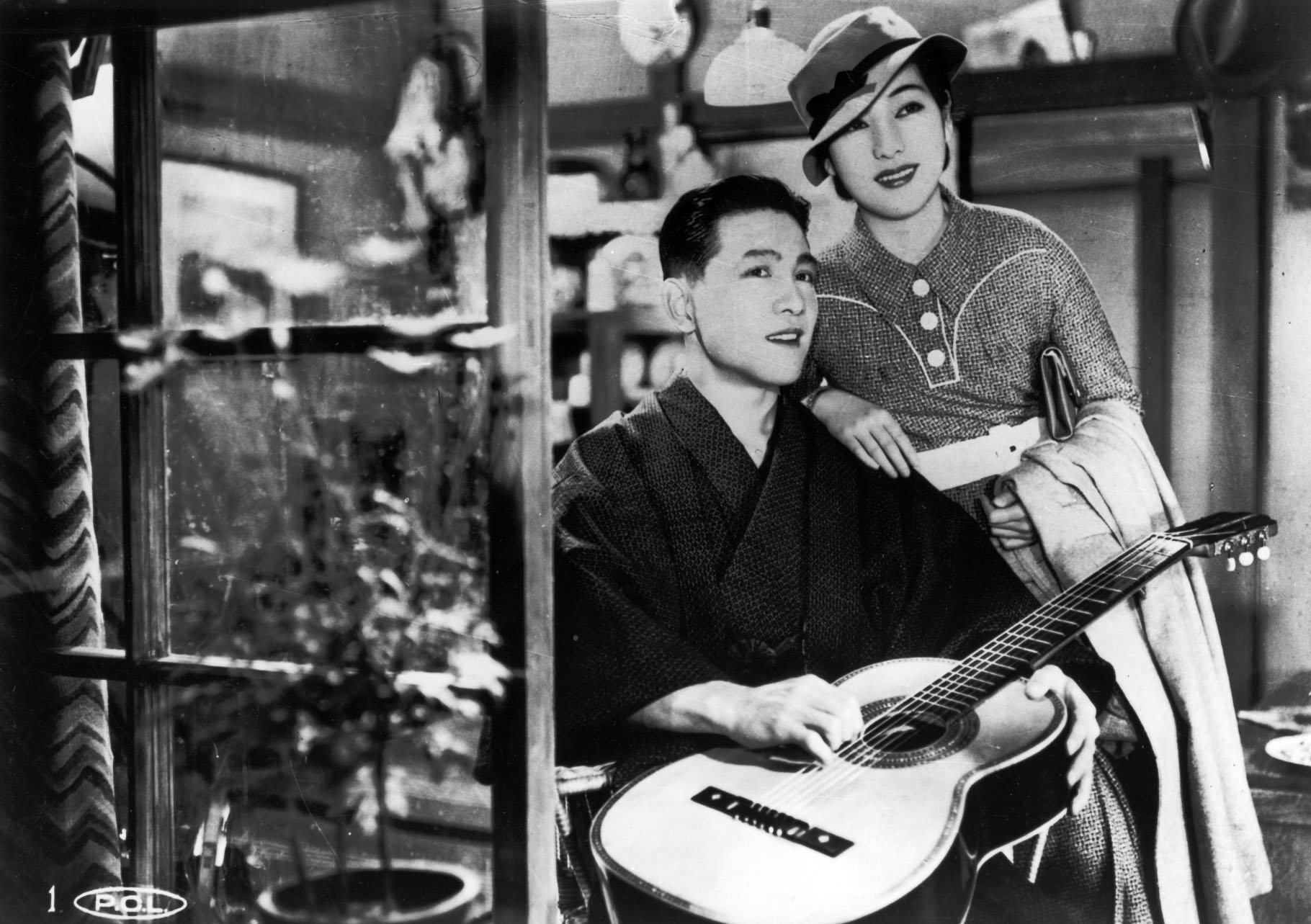

Japanese name
- Kanji: 妻よ薔薇のやうに
- Directed by: Mikio Naruse
- Written by: Mikio Naruse; Minoru Nakano (play)
- Starring: Sachiko Chiba; Heihachirō Ōkawa; Yuriko Hanabusa
- Cinematography: Hiroshi Suzuki
- Edited by: Kōichi Iwashita
- Music by: Noboru Itō
- Production company: P.C.L.
- Distributed by: P.C.L.
- Release date: 1 September 1935 (Japan)
- Running time: 74 minutes
- Country: Japan
- Language: Japanese

Wife! Be Like a Rose! (1935) by Mikio Naruse

Wife! Be Like a Rose! (Japanese: 妻よ薔薇のやうに, romanized: Tsuma yo bara no yô ni), also titled Kimiko, is a 1935 Japanese comedy drama film directed by Mikio Naruse. It is based on the shinpa play Futari tsuma (二人妻, lit. Two Wives) by Minoru Nakano and one of Naruse's earliest sound films. Wife! Be Like a Rose! was one of the first Japanese films to see a theatrical release in the United States. It was voted "The Best Japanese Film of the Year" in 1935 by critics of the prestigious film magazine Kinema Junpo.

== Plot ==
Kimiko, a young modern Tokyo woman, lives alone with her poet mother Etsuko. Etsuko still grieves for her former husband Shunsaku, who left the family for ex-geisha Oyuki fifteen years ago, although Kimiko remembers their marriage not as a happy one. Kimiko believes that her mother has brought her loneliness on herself by being a bad wife: her personality is too proud and serious. The only contact between Shunsaku, Etsuko and his daughter are money orders without personal messages he sends them. At her uncle's suggestion, Kimiko travels to the countryside to talk Shunsaku into returning to the family, as her boyfriend Seiji's father wants to meet him before giving his admittance to Kimiko's and Seiji's marriage. Contrary to her expectations, Shunsaku is happy with his new wife and their two children, and Oyuki turns out to be a warm-hearted person instead of the calculating woman Kimiko was sure to meet. Not only does she support her husband, whose business is going badly, but it is also she, not Shunsaku, who is sending the money to Etsuko and Kimiko. Shunsaku agrees to go to Tokyo with Kimiko, but after a short discordant time spent with his ex-wife, he returns to Oyuki and his children, while Kimiko finally accepts that the past cannot be reversed.

== Cast ==
- Sachiko Chiba as Kimiko Yamamoto
- Heihachirō Ōkawa as Seiji, Kimiko's boyfriend
- Yuriko Hanabusa as Oyuki
- Tomoko Itō as Etsuko, Kimiko's mother
- Setsuko Horikoshi as Shizuko, Oyuki's daughter
- Chikako Hosokawa as Shingo's wife
- Sadao Maruyama as Shunsaku, Kimiko's father
- Kaoru Itō as Kenichi, Oyuki's son
- Kamatari Fujiwara as Shingo, Etsuko's brother

== Background ==
Naruse had joined P.C.L. studios (soon to merge into Toho) only the year before, unhappy with the working conditions at his former studio Shochiku. Wife! Be Like a Rose! received the 1936 Kinema Junpo Award as Best Film of the Year and opened in New York in 1937 under the title Kimiko.

== Reception ==
Film creator and writer Dan Sallitt wrote that the film positions itself in an ideological middle ground between the modern, assertive woman and the traditional ideal of marriage and a woman’s place in the family. Kimiko, though her Americanized behavior deviates in multiple ways from her expected role, compensates for this when she tells herself that she will be a “good wife,” namely a wife who “acts childish and cajoling, or jealous sometimes, or motherly and protective.” By neutralizing the challenge that her modernity poses, she becomes the film’s “dialectical synthesis.”

== Legacy ==
Film historians have since emphasised the film's "sprightly, modern feel" and "innovative visual style" and "progressive social attitudes". It was screened at the Museum of Modern Art in 1985 and at the Harvard Film Archive in 2005 as part of their retrospectives on Mikio Naruse, and at the Cinémathèque Française in 2018.
