= The Girl in the Rumor =

1935 Japanese film

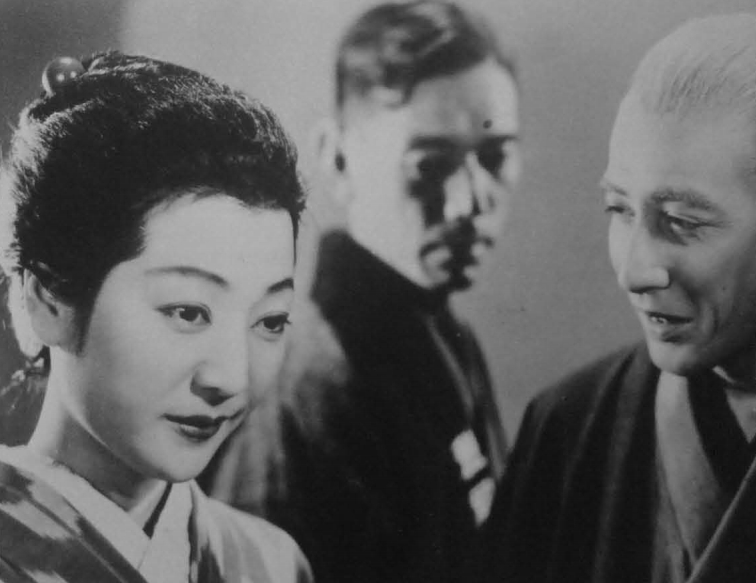

Japanese name
- Kanji: 噂の娘
- Directed by: Mikio Naruse
- Written by: Mikio Naruse
- Starring: Sachiko Chiba; Ryuko Umezono; Kō Mihashi
- Cinematography: Hiroshi Suzuki
- Edited by: Kōichi Iwashita
- Music by: Noboru Itō
- Production company: P.C.L.
- Distributed by: P.C.L.
- Release date: 22 December 1935 (Japan)
- Running time: 55 minutes
- Country: Japan
- Language: Japanese

The Girl in the Rumor (Japanese: 噂の娘, romanized: Uwasa no musume) is a 1935 Japanese drama film written and directed by Mikio Naruse.

== Plot ==
The film opens with a conversation between a barber and his customer about the Nadaya food store across the street which, in their words, is "going downhill" since the former owner Keisaku retired and his son Kenkichi took over. Keisaku starts drinking the store's sake already early in the day, complaining that the sake's quality is decreasing lately. While Kenkichi's more modern daughter Kimiko lives a life of ease, the more traditional Kunie is working in her father's store. Now that his wife has died, Kenkichi offers his mistress Oyo to move into their house, a plan endorsed by Kunie but opposed by Kimiko.

The sisters' uncle arranges an omiai between Kunie and Shintarō, son of a wealthy family, which Kenkichi is against as he himself was forced into an arranged and unhappy marriage. After the meeting between the marriage prospects, Shintarō shows more interest in Kimiko. Kunie's father and uncle soon learn of Shintarō preferring Kimiko over her, but hide the fact from Kunie. When Kunie finds out that Kimiko is dating Shintarō, her sister confesses her deed in the most insensitive way, leaving Kunie in grief.

Kenkichi finally arranges a meeting between Kimiko and Oyo in his house, explaining that Oyo is her real mother and that he and his wife brought her up as their second daughter. Kimiko refuses to accept the truth and makes preparations to leave the house. At this moment the police arrive and ask Kenkichi to follow them to the station for an interrogation, as he had cut the sake sold in his store. In the barber shop, the barber and a customer shrug off the Nadaya's fate, joking what kind of store will open in its place.

== Cast ==
- Sachiko Chiba as Kunie
- Ryuko Umezono as Kimiko
- Kō Mihashi as Kenkichi, the father
- Yō Shiomi as Keisaku, the grandfather
- Kamatari Fujiwara as the uncle
- Toshiko Itō as Oyo
- Heihachirō Ōkawa as Shintarō
- Masao Mishima as the barber

== Reception ==
In his 1959 book The Japanese Film – Art & Industry, film historian Donald Richie described The Girl in the Rumor as "a triumph of technique over old-fashioned material" and "opposed to the melodramatics of the period".
