= Street Without End =

1934 Japanese film

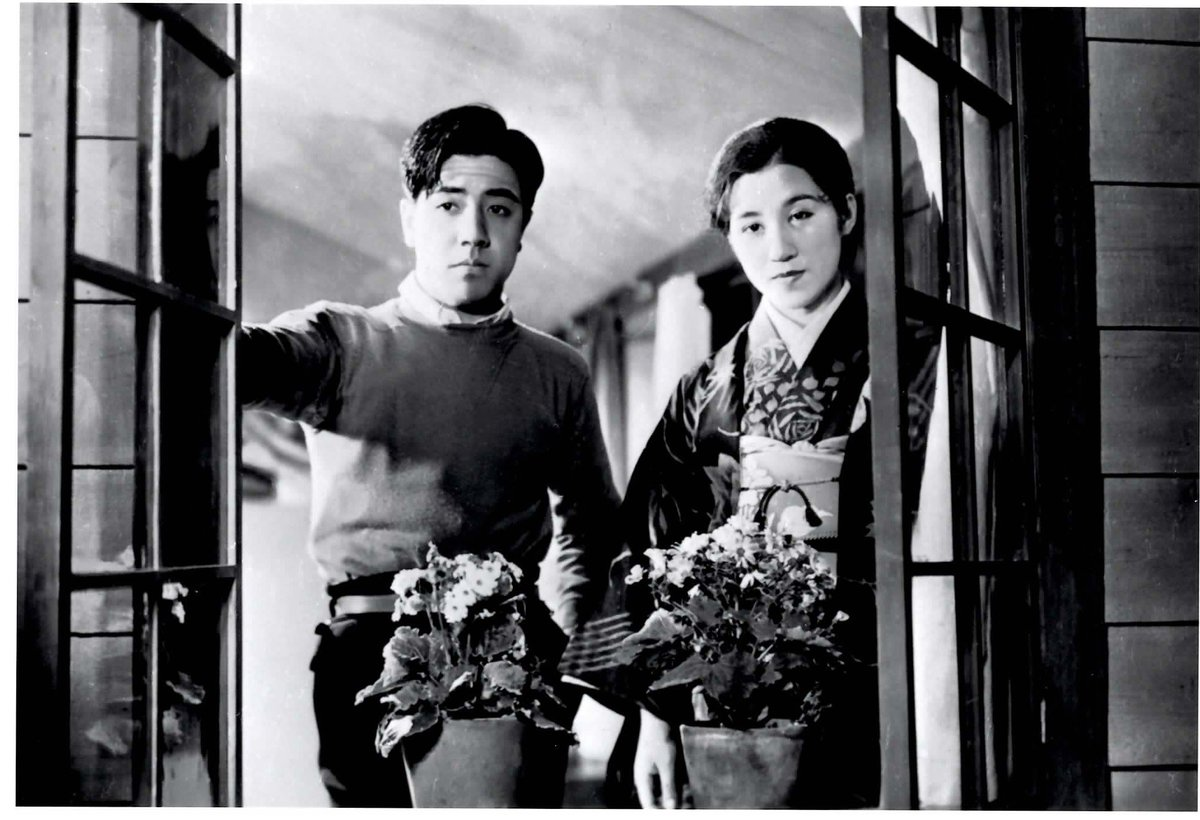
- Akio Isono and Setsuko Shinobu in Street Without End

Japanese name
- Kanji: 限りなき舗道
- Directed by: Mikio Naruse
- Written by: Tomizō Ikeda; Komatsu Kitamura (story)
- Starring: Setsuko Shinobu; Akio Isono; Sozo Okada
- Cinematography: Suketaro Inokai
- Production company: Shochiku
- Distributed by: Shochiku
- Release date: 26 April 1934 (Japan)
- Running time: 88 minutes
- Country: Japan
- Language: Japanese

Street Without End (限りなき舗道, Kagirinaki hodō) is a 1934 Japanese silent drama film directed by Mikio Naruse, based on a newspaper serial by Komatsu Kitamura. It was Naruse's last silent film and his final film for the Shochiku studio.

== Plot ==
Sugiko works as a waitress in a café in Tokyo's Ginza district. Her boyfriend Machio proposes to her, although his family has arranged a marriage with a woman from a wealthy family for him. She is also approached by Yukihiko, a talent scout for a film studio which is looking for a new star actress. When she steps onto the street absent-mindedly, she is hit by the car of Hiroshi, the heir of the Yamanouchi family. Machio sees her being taken away in Hiroshi's car, believing that she is dating Hiroshi and has decided against his proposal, and leaves town. Hiroshi starts dating Sugiko, despite his mother's and sister's objections against his liaison with a girl of lower class descent, but when he insists on marrying her, they eventually give in. Meanwhile, Sugiko's friend and colleague Kesako has successfully applied for the job at the film studio, which puts the relationship to her boyfriend Shinkichi to the test. Sugiko soon feels uncomfortable in her new home, and Hiroshi, unhappy with his family's overt reluctance to his wife, starts drinking frequently. After Sugiko leaves him, Hiroshi has a car accident and is hospitalised. At the hospital, Sugiko blames Hiroshi's mother and sister for never having accepted her. Hiroshi dies soon after, and Sugiko returns to her job in the Ginza café, reunited with Kesako and Shinkichi who quit the film studio.

== Cast ==
- Setsuko Shinobu as Sugiko Shima
- Akio Isono as Koichi, Sugiko's brother
- Sozo Okada as Hiroshi Yamanouchi
- Nobuko Wakaba as Takako, Hiroshi's sister
- Fumiko Katsuragi as Hiroshi's mother
- Shin'ichi Himori as Shinkichi
- Chiyoko Katori as Kesako
- Ichirō Yūki as Machio Harada, Sugiko's boyfriend
- Yukiko Inoue as Yoshiko Hisayama
- Shōzaburō Abe as barman
- Chishū Ryū as Yukihiko Chiba
- Tomio Aoki as boy on the telephone
- Takeshi Sakamoto
- Kōji Mitsui as café customer (credited as Hideo Mitsui)

== Release ==
Street Without End premiered in Japan on 26 April 1934. It was shown in the U.S. as part of a Naruse retrospective in 1985, organised by the Kawakita Memorial Film Institute and film scholar Audie Bock.
