= Mikio Naruse =

Japanese filmmaker (1905–1969)

- 成瀬 巳喜男
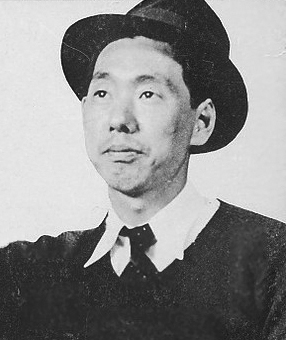
- Naruse in 1933
- Born: 20 August 1905; Yotsuya, Tokyo City, Empire of Japan
- Died: 2 July 1969 (aged 63); Tokyo, Japan
- Occupations: Film director, screenwriter
- Years active: 1930–1967
- Notable work: Repast (1951); Lightning (1952); Late Chrysanthemums (1954); Floating Clouds (1955); Flowing (1956); When a Woman Ascends the Stairs (1960)

Mikio Naruse (成瀬 巳喜男 or 成瀬 巳㐂男, Naruse Mikio; 20 August 1905 – 2 July 1969) was a Japanese film director and screenwriter who directed 89 films spanning the period 1930 to 1967.

Naruse is known for imbuing his films with a bleak and pessimistic outlook. He made primarily shōshimin-eiga ("common people drama") films with female protagonists, portrayed by actresses such as Hideko Takamine, Kinuyo Tanaka, and Setsuko Hara. Because of his focus on family drama and the intersection of traditional and modern Japanese culture, his films have been compared with the works of Yasujirō Ozu. Many of his films in his later career were adaptations of the works of acknowledged Japanese writers. Titled a "major figure of Japan's golden age" and "supremely intelligent dramatist", he remains lesser known than his contemporaries Akira Kurosawa, Kenji Mizoguchi, and Ozu. Among his most noted films are Sound of the Mountain, Late Chrysanthemums, Floating Clouds, Flowing and When A Woman Ascends The Stairs.

== Biography ==
=== Early years ===
Mikio Naruse was born in Tokyo in 1905 and raised by his brother and sister after his parents' early death. He entered Shirō Kido's Shōchiku film studio in the 1920s as a light crew assistant and was soon assigned to comedy director Yoshinobu Ikeda. It was not until 1930 that he was allowed to direct a film on his own. His debut film, the short slapstick comedy Mr. and Mrs. Swordplay (Chanbara fūfū), was edited by Heinosuke Gosho who tried to support the young filmmaker. The film was considered a success, and Naruse was allowed to direct the romance film Pure Love (Junjo). Both films, like the majority of his early works at Shōchiku, are regarded as lost.

Naruse's earliest extant work is the short Flunky, Work Hard! (1931), a mixture of comedy and domestic drama. In 1933–1934, he directed a series of silent melodramas, Apart From You, Every-Night Dreams, and Street Without End, which centered on women confronted with hostile environments and practical responsibilities, and demonstrated "a considerable stylistic virtuosity" (Alexander Jacoby). Unsatisfied with the working conditions at Shōchiku and the projects he was assigned to, Naruse left Shōchiku in 1934 and moved to P.C.L. studios (Photo Chemical Laboratories, which later became Toho).

His first major film was the comedy drama Wife! Be Like a Rose! (1935). It was elected as Best Movie of the Year by the magazine Kinema Junpo, and was the first Japanese film to receive a theatrical release in the United States (where it was not well received). The film concerns a young woman whose father deserted his family for a former geisha. When she visits her father in a remote mountain village, it turns out that the second wife is far more suitable for him than the first. Film historians have emphasised the film's "sprightly, modern feel" and "innovative visual style" and "progressive social attitudes".

Naruse's films of the following years are often regarded as lesser works by film historians, owed in parts to weak scripts and acting, although Jacoby noted the formal experimentation and sceptical attitude towards the institutions of marriage and family in Avalanche and A Woman's Sorrows (both 1937). Naruse later argued that at the time he did not have the courage to refuse some of the projects he was offered, and that his attempts to compensate weak content with concentration on technique did not work out.

During the war years, Naruse kept to what his biographer Catherine Russell referred to as "safe projects", including "home front films" like Sincerity. The early 1940s saw the collapse of Naruse's first marriage with Sachiko Chiba, who had starred in Wife! Be Like a Rose! and whom he had married in 1936. In 1941, he directed the comedy Hideko the Bus Conductor starring Hideko Takamine, who would later become his regular starring actress.

=== Post-war career ===
The 1951 Repast marked a return for the director and was the first of a series of adaptations of works of female writer Fumiko Hayashi, including Lightning (1952) and Floating Clouds (1955). All of these films featured women struggling with unhappy relationships or family relations and were awarded prestigious national film prizes. Late Chrysanthemums (1954), based on short stories by Hayashi, centered on four former geisha and their attempts to cope with financial restraints in post-war Japan. Sound of the Mountain (1954), a portrayal of a marriage falling apart, and Flowing (1956), which follows the decline of a once flourishing geisha house, were based on novels by Yasunari Kawabata and Aya Kōda.

In the 1960s, Naruse's output decreased in number (partially owed to illness), while film historians at the same time detect an increase of sentimentality and "a more spectacular mode of melodrama" (Russell). When a Woman Ascends the Stairs (1960) tells the story of an aging bar hostess trying to start her own business, A Wanderer's Notebook (1964) follows the life of writer Fumiko Hayashi. His last film was Scattered Clouds (a.k.a. Two in the Shadow, 1967). Two years later, Naruse died of cancer, aged 63.

Naruse died on July 2, 1969, due to colon cancer. Hideko Takamine said years later that she never went to the funeral or his grave since she wanted her last memory of him to be "that of the healthy-looking face with the gentle smile that I saw when I visited his house in Seijo [District, Tokyo]." Takamine had visited Naruse months before at his house, and was surprised at how talkative and cheerful he was in her conversation with him.

== Reputation ==
Naruse was described as serious and reticent, and even his closest and long-lasting collaborators like cinematographer Tamai Masao claimed to know nothing about him personally. He gave very few interviews and was, according to Akira Kurosawa, a very self-assured director who did everything himself on the set. Hideko Takamine remembered, "Even during the shooting of a picture, he would never say if anything was good, or bad, interesting or trite. He was a completely unresponsive director. I appeared in about 20 of his films, and yet there was never an instance in which he gave me any acting instructions." Tatsuya Nakadai recalled one instant during the filming of When a Woman Ascends the Stairs where Naruse yelled at an assistant director for drawing a cardboard eye to indicate the point of reference of Hideko Takamine's eyeline.

On one occasion, Naruse gave advice to Kihachi Okamoto on being a director, telling him: "You should stick to your own ideas. If you run from left to right and back again to suit the changing times, the results will be hollow."

== Filmography ==
Filmography of Mikio Naruse
| Year | English title | Japanese Title | Rōmaji Title | Notes |
|---|---|---|---|---|
Silent films
| 1930 | Mr. and Mrs. Swordplay | チャンバラ夫婦 | Chambara fufu | Lost. Also entitled Intimate Love |
| 1930 | Pure Love | 純情 | Junjo | Lost |
| 1930 | Hard Times | 不景気時代 | Fukeiki jidai | Lost |
| 1930 | Love Is Strength | 愛は力だ | Ai ha chikara da | Lost |
| 1930 | A Record of Shameless Newlyweds | 押切新婚記 | Oshikiri shinkonki | Lost |
| 1931 | Now Don't Get Excited | ねえ興奮しちゃいやよ | Nee kofun shicha iya yo | Lost |
| 1931 | Screams from the Second Floor | 二階の悲鳴 | Nikai no himei | Lost |
| 1931 | Flunky, Work Hard! | 腰弁頑張れ | Koshiben gambare | |
| 1931 | Fickleness Gets on the Train | 浮気は汽車に乗って | Uwaki wa kisha ni notte | Lost |
| 1931 | The Strength of a Moustache | 髭の力 | Hige no chikara | Lost |
| 1931 | Under the Neighbours' Roof | 隣の屋根の下 | Tonari no yani no shita | Lost |
| 1932 | Ladies, Be Careful of Your Sleeves | 女は袂を御用心 | Onna wa tamoto o goyojin | Lost |
| 1932 | Crying to the Blue Sky | 青空に泣く | Aozora ni naku | Lost |
| 1932 | Be Great! | 偉くなれ | Eraku nare | Lost |
| 1932 | Chocolate Girl | チョコレートガール | Chokoreito garu | Lost |
| 1932 | No Blood Relation | 生さぬ仲 | Nasanu naka | |
| 1932 | The Scenery of Tokyo with Cake | 菓子のある東京風景 | Kashi no aru Tokyo no fûkei | Lost. Short advertisement film |
| 1932 | Moth-eaten Spring | 蝕める春 | Mushibameru haru | Lost |
| 1933 | Apart From You | 君と別れて | Kimi to wakarete | |
| 1933 | Every-Night Dreams | 夜ごとの夢 | Yogoto no yume | |
| 1933 | A Married Woman's Hairstyle | 僕の丸髷 | Boku no marumage | Lost |
| 1933 | Two Eyes | 双眸 | Sobo | Lost |
| 1933 | Happy New Year! | 謹賀新年 | Kingashinnen | Lost |
| 1934 | Street Without End | 限りなき舗道 | Kagirinaki hodo | |
Sound films
| 1935 | Three Sisters with Maiden Hearts | 乙女ごころ三人姉妹 | Otome-gokoro sannin shimai | |
| 1935 | The Actress and the Poet | 女優と詩人 | Joyu to shijin | |
| 1935 | Wife! Be Like a Rose! | 妻よ薔薇のやうに | Tsuma yo bara no yo ni | Also entitled Kimiko |
| 1935 | Five Men in the Circus | サーカス五人組 | Saakasu goningumi | |
| 1935 | The Girl in the Rumor | 噂の娘 | Uwasa no musume | |
| 1936 | Man of the House | 桃中軒雲右衛門 | Tochuken Kumoemon | |
| 1936 | The Road I Travel with You | 君と行く路 | Kimi to yuku michi | |
| 1936 | Morning's Tree-Lined Street | 朝の並木路 | Asa no namikimichi | |
| 1937 | A Woman's Sorrows | 女人哀愁 | Nyonin aishu | |
| 1937 | Avalanche | 雪崩 | Nadare | |
| 1937 | Learn from Experience, Part I | 禍福 前篇 | Kafuku zempen | |
| 1937 | Learn from Experience, Part II | 禍福 後篇 | Kafuku kôhen | |
| 1938 | Tsuruhachi and Tsurujiro | 鶴八鶴次郎 | Tsuruhachi Tsurujirō | |
| 1939 | The Whole Family Works | はたらく一家 | Hatarakku ikka | |
| 1939 | Sincerity | まごころ | Magokoro | |
| 1940 | Travelling Actors | 旅役者 | Tabi yakusha | |
| 1941 | A Fond Face from the Past | なつかしの顔 | Natsukashi no kao | |
| 1941 | Shanghai Moon | 上海の月 | Shanhai no tsuki | Incomplete footage survives |
| 1941 | Hideko the Bus Conductor | 秀子の車掌さん | Hideko no shashō-san | |
| 1942 | Mother Never Dies | 母は死なず | Haha wa shinazu | |
| 1943 | The Song Lantern | 歌行燈 | Uta andon | |
| 1944 | This Happy Life | 愉しき哉人生 | Tanoshiki kana jinsei | |
| 1944 | The Way of Drama | 芝居道 | Shibaido | |
| 1945 | Until Victory Day | 勝利の日まで | Shori no hi made | Lost |
| 1945 | A Tale of Archery at the Sanjusangendo | 三十三間堂通し矢物語 | Sanjusangendo toshiya monogatari | |
| 1946 | The Descendents of Taro Urashima | 浦島太郎の後裔 | Urashima Taro no koei | |
| 1946 | Both You and I | 俺もお前も | Ore mo omae mo | |
| 1947 | Even Parting is Enjoyable | 別れも愉し | Wakare mo tanoshi | Part of anthology film Four Love Stories (Yottsu no kai no monogatari) |
| 1947 | Spring Awakens | 春のめざめ | Haru no mezame | |
| 1949 | The Delinquent Girl | 不良少女 | Furyo shojo | Lost |
| 1950 | Conduct Report on Professor Ishinaka | 石中先生行状記 | Ishinaka Sensei gyojoki | |
| 1950 | Angry Street | 怒りの街 | Ikari no machi | |
| 1950 | White Beast | 白い野獣 | Shiroi yaju | |
| 1950 | Battle of Roses | 薔薇合戦 | Bara kassen | |
| 1951 | Ginza Cosmetics | 銀座化粧 | Ginza keshō | |
| 1951 | Dancing Girl | 舞姫 | Maihime | |
| 1951 | Repast | めし | Meshi | |
| 1952 | Okuni and Gohei | お国と五平 | Okuni to Gohei | |
| 1952 | Mother | おかあさん | Okaasan | |
| 1952 | Lightning | 稲妻 | Inazuma | |
| 1953 | Husband and Wife | 夫婦 | Fufu | |
| 1953 | Wife | 妻 | Tsuma | |
| 1953 | Older Brother, Younger Sister | あにいもうと | Ani Imoto | |
| 1954 | Sound of the Mountain | 山の音 | Yama no oto | Also entitled The Thunder of the Mountain |
| 1954 | Late Chrysanthemums | 晩菊 | Bangiku | |
| 1955 | Floating Clouds | 浮雲 | Ukigumo | |
| 1955 | Women's ways | 女同士 | Onna dōshi | Third segment of anthology film The Kiss (くちづけ, Kuchizuke) |
| 1956 | Sudden Rain | 驟雨 | Shūu | |
| 1956 | A Wife's Heart | 妻の心 | Tsuma no kokoro | |
| 1956 | Flowing | 流れる | Nagareru | |
| 1957 | Untamed | あらくれ | Arakure | |
| 1958 | Anzukko | 杏っ子 | Anzukko | |
| 1958 | Summer Clouds | 鰯雲 | Iwashigumo | Naruse's first color film |
| 1959 | Whistling in Kotan | コタンの口笛 | Kotan no kuchibue | Color film. Also entitled Whistle in My Heart |
| 1960 | When a Woman Ascends the Stairs | 女が階段を上る時 | Onna ga kaidan o agaru toki | |
| 1960 | Daughters, Wives and a Mother | 娘・妻・母 | Musume tsuma haha | Color film |
| 1960 | The Lovelorn Geisha | 夜の流れ | Yoru no nagare | Color film. Co-directed with Yuzo Kawashima |
| 1960 | The Approach of Autumn | 秋立ちぬ | Aki tachinu | Also entitled Autumn Has Already Started |
| 1961 | As a Wife, As a Woman | 妻として女として | Tsuma toshite onna toshite | Color film. Also entitled The Other Woman |
| 1962 | A Woman's Place | 女の座 | Onna no za | Also entitled The Wiser Age and A Woman's Status |
| 1962 | A Wanderer's Notebook | 放浪記 | Horoki | Also entitled Her Lonely Lane |
| 1963 | A Woman's Story | 女の歴史 | Onna no rekishi | |
| 1964 | Yearning | 乱れる | Midareru | |
| 1966 | The Stranger Within a Woman | 女の中にいる他人 | Onna no naka ni iru tanin | Also entitled The Thin Line |
| 1966 | Hit and Run | ひき逃げ | Hikinige | Also entitled Moment of Terror |
| 1967 | Scattered Clouds | 乱れ雲 | Midaregumo | Color film. Also entitled Two in the Shadow |

== Style and themes ==
Naruse is known as particularly exemplifying the Japanese concept of "mono no aware", the awareness of the transience of things, and a gentle sadness at their passing. "From the youngest age, I have thought that the world we live in betrays us", the director explained. His protagonists were usually women, and his studies of female experience spanned a wide range of social milieux, professions and situations. Six of his films were adaptations of a single novelist, Fumiko Hayashi, whose pessimistic outlook seemed to match his own. From her work he made films about unrequited passion, unhappy families and stale marriages. Surrounded by unbreakable family bonds and fixed customs, the characters are never more vulnerable than when they for once decide to make an individual move: "If they move even a little, they quickly hit the wall" (Naruse). Expectations invariably end in disappointment, happiness is impossible, and contentment is the best the characters can achieve. Of Repast, Husband and Wife and Wife, Naruse said, "these pictures have little that happens in them and end without a conclusion–just like life". While his earlier films employ a more experimental style, Naruse's post-war films show a paring down of style, relying on editing, lighting, acting, and sets.

== Legacy ==
A 1973 retrospective on Mikio Naruse was presented at Japan Society, then noted as the “first film series ever devoted exclusively to the work of Naruse.” Film scholar Audie Bock curated two extensive retrospectives on Naruse in Chicago at the Gene Siskel Film Center (then The Film Center of the School of the Art Institute of Chicago) and New York at Japan Society and the Museum of Modern Art in 1984–1985. Retrospectives have also been held at the Berkeley Art Museum and Pacific Film Archive in 1981 and 2006, at the Locarno Film Festival (1984), at festivals in Hong Kong (1987) and Melbourne (1988), and at the Harvard Film Archive in 2005.

== Awards ==
Floating Clouds and Flowing have been voted into the 2009 All Time Best Japanese Movies lists by readers and critics of Kinema Junpo.

| Year of award | Name of Award | Awarding organization | Country of Origin | Film title (if applicable) |
|---|---|---|---|---|
| 1935 | Best Japanese Film | Kinema Junpo | Japan | Wife! Be Like a Rose! |
| 1951 | Best Film | Blue Ribbon Awards | Japan | Repast |
| 1951 | Best Film | Mainichi Film Awards | Japan | Repast |
| 1951 | Best Director | Mainichi Film Awards | Japan | Repast |
| 1952 | Best Film | Blue Ribbon Awards | Japan | Lightning |
| 1952 | Best Director | Blue Ribbon Awards | Japan | Lightning; Mother |
| 1955 | Best Film | Blue Ribbon Awards | Japan | Floating Clouds |
| 1955 | Best Japanese Film | Kinema Junpo | Japan | Floating Clouds |
| 1955 | Best Japanese Director | Kinema Junpo | Japan | Floating Clouds |
| 1955 | Best Film | Mainichi Film Awards | Japan | Floating Clouds |
| 1955 | Best Director | Mainichi Film Awards | Japan | Floating Clouds |
