= Ichikawa Raizō VIII =

Japanese actor (1931–1969)

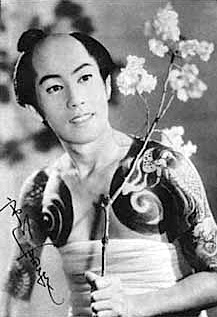
- Jinan-bō Hangan (1955)
- Born: Akio Kamezaki; August 29, 1931; Kyoto
- Died: July 17, 1969 (aged 37); Tokyo
- Other names: Yoshio Takeuchi, Yoshiya Ōta, Ichikawa Enzō
- Occupations: film actor, kabuki actor
- Years active: 1954–1969

Ichikawa Raizō VIII (八代目 市川 雷蔵, Hachidaime Ichikawa Raizō; August 29, 1931 – July 17, 1969) was a Japanese film and kabuki actor. His birth name was Akio Kamezaki (亀崎 章雄, Kamezaki Akio), and his name was legally changed several times, first to Yoshio Takeuchi (武内 嘉男, Takeuchi Yoshio), and later to Yoshiya Ōta (太田 吉哉, Ōta Yoshiya), separate from his performing name.

Six months after his birth in Kyoto he became the adopted son of Ichikawa Kudanji III (三代目 市川 九團次, Sandaime Ichikawa Kudanji). He made his kabuki acting debut at the age of 15 under the name Ichikawa Enzō (市川延蔵, Ichikawa Enzō). In 1951 he was adopted by Ichikawa Jūkai III (三代目 市川 壽海, Sandaime Ichikawa Jūkai) and was renamed as Ichikawa Raizō VIII. In 1954 he began a career as a film actor. He received breakout acclaim for his performance in Enjō and received several awards for the performance including the Blue Ribbon Award and the Kinema Junpo Award, both for the category of Best Performance by an Actor in a Leading Role. Among his fans he was referred to lovingly as "Rai-sama." In June 1968 he was diagnosed with and underwent surgery for rectal cancer, but it metastasized to his liver and he died the following year.

Ichikawa Raizō appeared mostly in period dramas (jidaigeki). He is best known for the Sleepy Eyes of Death (Nemuri Kyoshirō) series, Ninja (Shinobi no Mono) series and Nakano Spy School (Rikugun Nakano Gakkō) series (based on the Nakano School). Raizō worked many times with director Kenji Misumi. Their collaborations include The Sword (Ken) (from a book by Yukio Mishima) and Destiny's Son, originally released as 斬る (Kiru).

The actor's other notable works include An Actor's Revenge (Yukinojo henge). He was so admired for his gracefulness that in his lifetime he was called "the genius who thinks with his body."

== Biography ==
=== Birth and adoption by Ichikawa Kudanji III ===
Ichikawa Raizō was born in the Nakagyō ward of Kyoto on August 29, 1931. At the time of his birth, he was named Akio Kamezaki. At six months of age he was adopted by Ichikawa Kudanji III, who renamed him Yoshio Takeuchi.

According to the film critic Rikiya Tayama, the details of his adoption are as follows: While Raizō's mother was pregnant, Raizō's father was transferred to Nara as an executive trainee (幹部候補生, Kanbukōhosei) in the Imperial Japanese Army, leaving her behind at his family's home. She was persecuted by his family and attempted to reach out to him for help but was ignored. When she could no longer bear it she fled to her own family's home, where Raizō was born. The relationship between her and her husband having deteriorated, Raizo's mother intended to raise him on her own. At this point she received repeated petitions from her husband's brother-in-law, Ichikawa Kudanji III, to allow him to raise the child. She initially refused these offers, but ultimately relented, and Raizō was officially adopted by Kudanji at the age of six months. Raizō was not aware of his adoption until he was 16 years old, and he did not meet his mother in person until he was 30.

=== Kabuki debut (1934 – May 1949) ===
In 1934, about two years after his adoption by Ichikawa Kudanji III, Raizō moved from Kyoto to Osaka. Kudanji did not train him as a kabuki actor during his childhood, but in 1946, when he was in his third and final year at Osaka Prefectural Tennoji High School, Raizō elected to withdraw from school to pursue an acting career. (Note: On the experience of becoming a kabuki actor, Raizō himself said that as he was on the verge of quitting junior high school and simply spending his time about the house instead, he got something of an interest in the world of kabuki and somehow ended up as a kabuki actor,（Ichikawa 1995, pp. 16-18）but in fact he had attempted to join the Japanese Imperial Navy as an officer or a doctor. His myopia made officership unattainable, and he ended up abandoning hope of becoming a doctor as well.（Tayama 1988, p. 18, Hosaka 2001, p. 321）)

In November 1946, at the age of 15, Raizō made his kabuki debut at the Osaka Kabukiza theater under the name Ichikawa Enzō III (Kudanji had previously used the name Ichikawa Enzō II). His first role was the part of Lady Ohana (Musume Ohana) in the play Nakayamashichiri.

In May 1949, a little over two years after his first performance, Raizō formed a study group with two other young kabuki performers. These were Rishō Arashi (known later in his kabuki career as Arashi Kichisaburō VIII, and as Yatarō Kitagami in his acting career) and Nakamura Taro II. They called this group the Tsukushikai (つくし会), which can be translated as "exhaustive meeting," and together they focused diligently on training. However, there was one obstacle that this training could not overcome: Kudanji had been the son of a member of a minor politician in Kyoto rather than a kabuki actor, and had only been apprenticed (to an actor known as Ichikawa Sadanji II) because of Kudanji's own strong desire to enter the world of kabuki. Thus Kudanji was forever labeled as a montei agari – someone born and raised outside of the kabuki world and its "lineage" and later apprenticed into it – and doomed never to exceed a supporting role. That being the case, no matter how hard Raizō trained, he was unlikely to gain noteworthy roles as a kenmon performer as long as he remained the son of Kudanji.

=== Adoption by Ichikawa Jūkai III (June 1949 – June 1951) ===
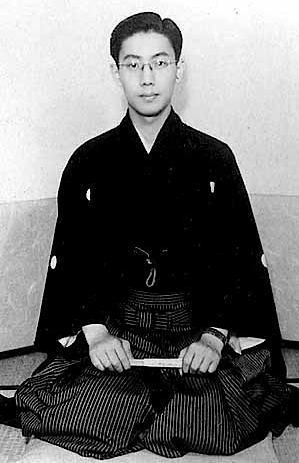
Commemorative photo of Ichikawa Raizō VIII on the day of his adoption by Ichikawa Jukai III in April, 1951

In 1949, in the same period that Raizō was establishing the Tsukushikai, a kabuki theater director named Tetsuji Takechi was scouting for young, talented kabuki performers to join his traditionalist troupe, Tetsuji Kabuki. (Note: Takechi Kabuki’s first production opened in December 1949.) The members of the Tsukushikai participated in this troupe and thus made the acquaintance of Tetsuji. Tetsuji thought very highly of Raizō's acting talents, but realized that so long as he remained known as Kudanji's son he would never be able to truly shine in the world of kabuki and his talent would be wasted. To that end Tetsuji formed a plan to have Raizō take the name of Nakamura Jakuemon (中村 雀右衛門), which had been unused for a quarter century, but Nakamura Jakuemon III – who was no longer performing, but still alive – was dissatisfied with Raizō's thus-far inability to gain real recognition and refused to allow the name's use.

After that, it is known that Tetsuji intended to apprentice Raizō under the childless Ichikawa Jukai III (三代目 市川 壽海, Sandaime Ichikawa Jukai). In December 1950, Ichikawa Jukai III attended a meeting of the Tsukushikai in an observational capacity. He was highly impressed by Raizō's performance as Minamoto no Yoriie in the play Shuzenji Monogatari. Jukai had been the son of a kimono-maker and thus had had no connection to the world of kabuki through his lineage, but despite this, through great effort on his part, Jukai had become quite renowned in the Kansai kabuki scene during and after the Second World War. By the time he met Raizō in 1950, Jukai had become the president of the Kansai Kabuki Actors Guild, a position of great influence. Furthermore, the name "Jukai" had been bestowed upon Ichikawa Jukai III by both of the actors who had used it before: Ichikawa Danjūrō VII and Ichikawa Danjūrō IX; and he had even been granted usage of the "Naritaya" (成田屋) and "Kotobuki Ebi" (壽 海老) yagō and kamon traditionally used by the head of the Ichikawa line. (Note: The “Kotobuki Ebi” is currently used by Ichikawa Ebizō, representative of the Ichikawa line, as an alternative to his usual kamon as his acting symbol.) With the help of some mutual friends, Tetsuji was successful in his efforts and Jukai agreed to officially adopt Raizō. At this point Jukai wished to give Raizō the name Ichikawa Shinzō (市川 新蔵), a name with deep roots in the Ichikawa house stretching back to the 1600s, but the chief cabinet secretary of the Ichikawa house, Ichikawa En'ō II, viciously fought against this wish, stating "We can't bestow a name with such deep family ties to some unknown performer from an unknown line." (Note: It was hoped that Ichikawa Shinzō V, who was adopted by Ichikawa Danjurō IX, would someday take the name “Ichikawa Danjurō X,” but he fell ill and died young, so this never came to pass.) After long negotiations they finally settled on the name "Ichikawa Raizō." The adoption was finalized in April 1951, and the ceremony for the succession of the "Ichikawa Raizo" name was carried out in June of the same year. According to the film director Kazuo Ikehiro, around this time rumors began to circulate that Ichikawa Jukai III was actually Raizō's biological father.

Upon his second adoption Raizō's legal name was changed again as well, to Yoshiya Ōta. This name was chosen by Raizō himself, as he was weary of being judged by his current family name. According to Akinari Suzuki, the studio president of Daiei Kyoto Studio, Raizō often advised those around him to consider changing their names, and it's said that some 20 to 30 people related to the film studio did so upon Raizō's recommendation. In fact, Masako Nagata, the woman Raizō would eventually marry, was originally named Kyōko, and changed her given name after Raizō suggested she do so.

=== Transition into film acting (July 1951 – 1957) ===
Raizō became Jukai's adopted son in 1951, but Jukai believed that the 20-year-old Raizō was still too young to take on major roles and adopted a policy of only giving him minor roles for the time being. As a result of this Raizō decided to pursue a film career in 1954 and joined the Daiei film studio.

Regarding his transition to film acting, Raizō maintained that he did it simply because it seemed like a good opportunity and he wanted to try it out. Rikiya Tayama has said that the real reason was that Raizō, dissatisfied with the treatment he received over the years, was extremely upset when he was cast as an idiot without a single line in the Osaka Kabukiza's performance of Kōya Hijiri in June 1954, (Note: Raizō, who had been pining after a role in Kōyahijiri, said to Tetsuji Takechi, “thanks to this, I’ll be stuck as a supporting actor for all time.”（ノーベル書房 (Nōberu Shobo) (Complete) 1991, 196.）) and thus decided to leave the world of kabuki for good. Fortuitously he received an offer from Daiei Films who intended to position him as a star in their jidaigeki – period dramas – and accepted it, leaving the kabuki world for film. From that time forwards, Raizō only performed in a single kabuki play: the January 1964 production of Kanjinchō directed by Tetsuji Takechi at the newly completed Nissay Theater, in which he played Yasuie Togashi. On that occasion Raizō said, "In Kabuki you're no good unless you're old. In film you're no good once you're old. While I'm still young I'll make a living in film, once I've gotten older I'll try kabuki again." Once he had decided to pursue a film career, Raizō began to frequent the movie theater to study the performances of Yorozuya Kinnosuke in jidaigeki produced by Toei.

Raizō made his film debut on August 25, 1954, in The Great White Tiger Platoon (Hana no Byakkotai). While Raizō had been held back in the world of kabuki by the circumstances of his parentage, he was treated with great respect in the world of film, as the son of Ichikawa Jukai III, president of the Kanto Kabuki Guild. Daiei's management intended to position Raizō as a successor to the popular Kazuo Hasegawa, and gave Raizō the starring role in his fifth and sixth films, The Young Swordsman (Shiode Kushima Binan Kenpō), released December 22, 1954, and The Second Son (Jinanbō Garasu), released January 29, 1955.

In 1955, two years after his film debut, Raizō received great attention for his portrayal of Taira no Kiyomori in director Kenji Mizoguchi's Shin Heike Monogatari, released on September 21 of that year. Tokuzō Tanaka, director of 16 of Raizō's films, stated that at first it seemed as though it would be difficult to make Raizō into a great success, but that impression changed instantly with Shin Heike Monogatari. Kazuo Ikehiro, who directed another 16 of Raizō's films, said that until that point it had seemed that Raizō was simply imitating Kazuo Hasegawa, but bit by bit his innate acting talent had begun to shine through. The film critic Tadao Sato wrote that until now Raizō had "portrayed only handsome young samurai and yakuza, as though following in the footsteps of Kazuo Hasegawa" but that now he "has come to be a distinguished actor worthy of high praise, giving fresh performances in elegant dramas, rather than only performing in chanbara – samurai films with an action focus. In the wake of Shin Heike Monogatari, Raizō performed in over 10 films released in the period of a single year. He worked tirelessly, giving up holidays and weekends to continue filming.

Raizō had weak legs, and would often become faint when standing or walking. Masayoshi Tsuchida, then head of Daiei's planning department, said that it must have been an incredible adventure to play "Kiyomori, the youth who pierced the heavens" for the physically frail Raizō. Raizō was self-conscious about the weakness of his legs and joined the sumo club at Doshisha University in an attempt to train and strengthen them, but it was no use. Whenever photos were taken of Raizō, the photography staff took special precautions to frame the shot in such a way as to avoid showing Raizō's weak legs. According to Kenji Misumi, director of 18 of Raizō's films, Raizō deeply loathed the physical frailty of his body, but when he finally managed to overcome that loathing and accept himself he became capable of incredible composure.

=== Rise to stardom (1958 – May 1968) ===
In 1958 Kon Ichikawa cast Raizō in the lead role of the film Enjō, based on the novel The Temple of the Golden Pavilion by Yukio Mishima. The film was released on August 19 of that year. According to Ichikawa, Hiroshi Kawaguchi was originally intended for the role, but Ichikawa argued against this selection based on an instinctive feeling that Raizō was the right choice for the role and ultimately succeeded in convincing the studio president, Masaichi Nagata, to cast Raizō instead. There was some resistance within the studio, as it was felt that a newcomer with a stammer should not be given such a large role in his second film with the studio, but he was ultimately given the part, stating "we need to give the young actor Ichikawa Raizō a chance if we want to make him into a success." Raizō rose to the occasion and gave an excellent performance. Ichikawa praised Raizō's acting, saying "I give it a perfect score, 100 of 100. There's simply nothing else to say."

It's often said that Raizō's performance in Enjō reflected his childhood. Ichikawa said, "He's expressing something of his true self through his performance," and "He's overcome something through his acting ... some sort of burden he had been carrying; and his indescribable life can be seen in his expression." Tokuzō Tanaka said that Raizō's complicated childhood had caused something like a base part of his heart to emerge, merging with and adding depth to his performance. Kazuo Ikehiro said that precisely because of this "hidden part of his childhood," or "base part of his heart," that Raizō was perfectly equipped for the performance. Once, when a member of the Daiei planning department named Hisakazu Tsuji mused aloud that he felt as though his performance in Enjō reflected Raizō's childhood, Raizō did not refute it.

For his performance in Enjō, Raizō received the Kinema Junpo Award for best male actor in a leading role, and the Blue Ribbon Award for best performer in a leading role, among others. Raizō's position as a star had been secured.

The Nemuri Kyoshirō series of films, which began in 1963 and are known as Sleepy Eyes of Death in the west, are considered to be the representative work of Raizō's later years. According to Tokuzō Tanaka, playing the part of the protagonist, Kyoshirō, was an extreme challenge for Raizō. Speaking of the first film in the series, Sappōchō, even Raizō himself said that "the characteristic 'hollowness' of Kyoshirō simply didn't come out at all" and deemed the film a failure. It wasn't until the fourth film, Joyōken, that Raizō succeeded in bringing the hollowness, dandyism and nihilism of the character to life. The actor Shintarō Katsu described Raizō's performance in the Nemuri Kyoshirō films, saying "When he was playing Kyoshirō he had a real animal magnetism about him, didn't he. Maybe you could say it came from this sense of the shadow of death hanging over him. It really is the face people make when they die, that expression." “When he’d walk by, Rai-chan would cut you with his face. Not with a sword, with his face,” he reminisced, “Rai-chan didn’t become Kyoshirō through his fight scenes or the delivery of his lines, he did it through his face; that’s my opinion, anyway.” Kazuo Ikehiro said, “without speaking, without any kind of facial expression, simply by the way he walked around as though he were carrying his past on his back” Akira Inoue, director of the seventh film in the series, Tajōken, said that there were other actors who played Kyoshirō, but none of them could compare to Raizō when it came to portraying Kyoshirō's soul. Raizō went on to hold the starring role in 12 films in the series, which represents a majority of the starring roles for which Raizō was cast.

According to Kazuo Ikehiro, as Raizō's experience as an actor accumulated he began to desire to take a larger role in film creation through directing. Ikehiro advised Raizō to pursue the role of producer, rather than director, as he would then be able to make decisions about subject matter, scripts, and casting in addition to direction. In January 1968, Raizō said “I want to assemble a new dramatic production, the likes of which has never been seen before,” and began the process of establishing a new theater company called “Teatoro Kaburaya” at which he would take a producer role, but as soon as it was founded he fell ill and the company never began operations. According to Seiji Hoshikawa, director of 14 of Raizō's films, Raizō said to Hoshikawa and Kenji Misumi, “Cinema might not have that much time left. Let’s stage a play sometime, the three of us. Let’s give a new job a shot,” and more specifically “Let’s try to capture Kawatake Mokuami’s works through a modern lens.”

=== The final years and premature death at age 37 (June 1968 – July 17th, 1969) ===
In June 1968, while in the process of filming Seki no Yatappe, Raizō visited a doctor because of bloody stool, and was soon admitted to the hospital. The results of his examinations clearly indicated rectal cancer, but the diagnosis was not made known to Raizō. On August 10, Raizō underwent surgery and was released from the hospital, but his family received a prognosis from his doctor stating that Raizō would “relapse in about half a year.” Raizō had possessed a weak digestive system from birth, and had previously visited a doctor for the same symptoms in January 1961, after filming Kutsukake Tokijirō. At that time he had been told simply that “there is a wound in the rectum” when examined. There's also a record of him confiding to Tetsuji Takechi, “I’m tormented by diarrhea,” in 1964, at the occasion of his performance of Kanjinchō at the Nissay Theater.

After leaving the hospital, Raizo performed in the films Nemuri Kyōshirō: Akujo-gari (released January 11, 1969), and Bakuto Ichidai: Chimatsuri Fudō (released February 12, 1969), but his physical strength was rapidly dwindling, and they had to resort to a body double with voice-over for all of his scenes involving walking and movement. In February 1969, complaining of physical unwellness, Raizō was admitted to the hospital once again. After his second surgery Raizō was so weak that he couldn't swallow soup, but he deeply wished to play the role of a naval officer in the film Aa, Kaigun, and began talks with people related to the film. His recovery was not complete by the time filming began, and Daiei cast Nakamura Kichiemon II as a substitute in order to begin filming. After learning of the recast by reading it in the newspaper, Raizō never again spoke about work. He died several months later, on July 17, of liver cancer, at the age of 37. His funeral was held on July 23, at the Ikegami Honmon-ji temple in the Ōta ward of Tokyo. His grave is at the same temple.

It has been said that in the time before his death, Raizō deliriously entreated that nobody be allowed to see his face when he died. His wife, Masako Ōta, staunchly denies these claims, stating “Raizō never gave up on recovery, even until the end; he never even wrote a will.” Nevertheless, after his death Raizō's face was wrapped in two layers of white cloth, which remained in place even as he was cremated. According to Masako, Raizō had said only “I don’t want anyone to see how dreadfully thin I've become,” and because of that wish she had not allowed anyone aside from his adopted father, Jukai, and his company president, Nagata, to see his face after his death.

Raizō's final film, Bakuto Ichidai: Chimatsuri Fudō, was an example of the then-popular ninkyō eiga – pro-yakuza films – produced by Toei Studios. Raizō was reluctant to participate, saying “Should I just reheat the scraps left by Kōji Tsuruta?” – Tsurata being an actor well known for performing in such films – but Masayoshi Tsuchiya convinced him, saying “I’ll make sure you get the next role you want to play.” The following year Tsuchiya expressed deep regret that this role which Raizō had not wanted to play had become his last. In 1971, two years after Raizō's death, Daiei Studios filed for bankruptcy. Seiji Hoshikawa reflected on this, saying “Raizō’s death was a precursor to Daiei’s bankruptcy.”

=== Raizō's legacy (July 17, 1969 – present) ===
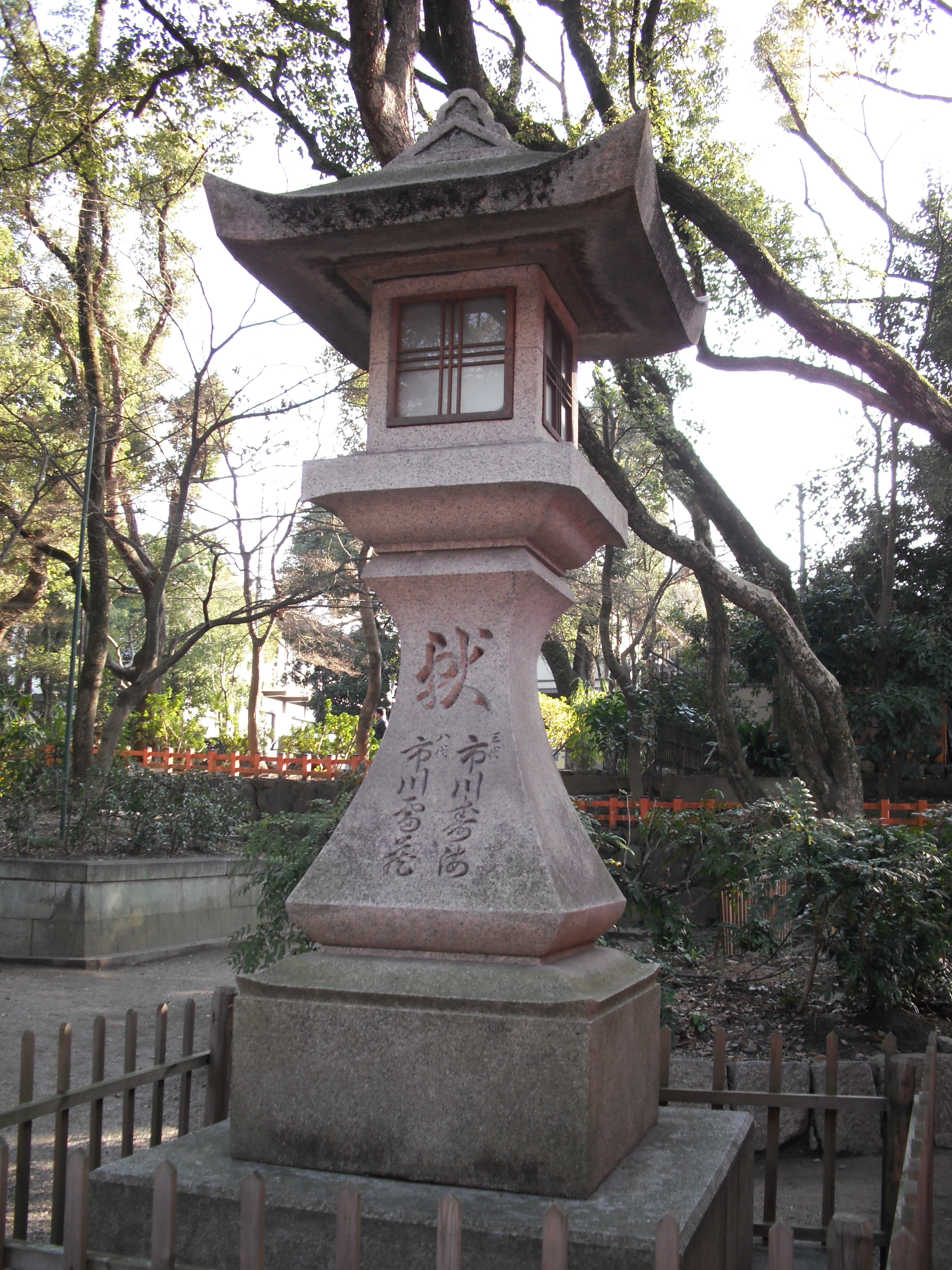
Raizō and Jukai's names can be seen inscribed on this tōrō, which is located at the Yasaka Shrine in Gion, Kyoto.

In 1974, five years after Raizō's death, a fan club called “Raizō-kai” was formed. This fan club is still functioning as of this writing in 2012. According to Masaki Matsubara, once president of Daiei Kyoto Studios, Raizō's fans were drawn in by his acting and his humanity, and thus, unlike many other stars of the time, his fanbase had the rare characteristic of having many intelligent and educated female fans. “You didn’t see the type that only squealed and caused a big fuss,” he said. The “Ichikawa Raizo Film Festival,” in which a selection of his films are shown, became an annual event, held each year on the anniversary of his death, July 17. From December 2009 until May 2011 an especially large event was held and his performances were screened to commemorate the 40th anniversary of his passing.

In 2000, Kinema Junpō published an article titled “Film Stars of the 20th Century: Male Actors.” Raizō placed 6th. In the same issue's “Readers’ Choice: Male Film Stars of the 20th Century" he was ranked 7th. In the 2014 list of “All Time Best Japanese Film Stars” he was ranked 3rd in the list of male actors.

In a 2014 blog post, Ichikawa Ebizō XI implied that the honorific name Ichikawa Raizō was under his care, and thus it can be seen as having been returned to the Ichikawa house and line following Raizō's death.

== Family ==
Raizō married Masako Nagata, adopted daughter of Masaichi Nagata, in a private wedding ceremony in 1962. She took his name, becoming Masako Ōta, and they had three children together. Raizō had told Masako “I never want [my family] in the public eye,” when he was alive, and she continued to uphold his wishes after his death until 40 years had passed, when a special issue of Bungeishunjū was published in 2009, featuring a memoir by Masako Ōta titled “A love letter to my husband, Ichikawa Raizo, 40 years later.”

== Awards ==
Data taken from “雷蔵, 雷蔵を語る” (Raizō, Raizō ga Kataru)

- January 1959: Kinema Junpō – Best Performance by an Actor in a Leading Role (Enjō)
- February 1959: Blue Ribbon Award – Best Performance by an Actor in a Leading Role, NHK Film – Excellence in a Male Leading Role (Enjō, Benten Kozō)
- September 1959: Cinema Nuovo – Excellence in a Male Role (Enjō)
- November 1964: Tokyo Citizens’ Film Festival – Best Performance by an Actor in a Leading Role (Ken)
- February 1967: NHK Film – Excellence in a Male Leading Role, Kinema Junpō – Best Performance by an Actor in a Leading Role (Hanaoka Seishū no Tsuma)
- November 1968: Tokyo Citizens’ Film Festival – Best Performance by an Actor in a Leading Role (Hanaoka Seishū no Tsuma)
- November 1969: Tokyo Citizens’ Film Festival – Makino Shōzō Prize

== Acclaim ==
=== Acting ===
The screenwriter Fuji Yahiro said of Raizō's manners, “Regardless of to whom he was speaking, he was always polite and proper, without arrogance or effusive emotion,” and that shone through in his acting style. According to Yahiro, “Even among the great number of jidaigeki actors, nobody else had his good manners – and I mean that in a good way – not a single other actor felt like a true bushi-like swordsman the way he did.”

Kazuo Ikehiro said that Raizō's childhood cast a “shadow of heartlessness” over him, and because of that a “shadowed part” and a “true background part" of his life were exposed. Moreover, they were not merely exposed, but thrust forward willfully, in Ikehiro's estimation. Kazuo Mori, the director with whom Raizō produced the greatest number of films, said that Raizo carried “a human pain of which he didn’t speak to anyone” which he sublimated into each of his performances. In an interview between Mori and the film critic Sadao Yamane, the two agreed that Raizō had a “refreshing sorrow” about him. Yamane explained this further, saying “while it’s true that he played a great many tragic roles, it wasn’t simply with a dark depression or gloom; he had a very crisp presentation. There wasn’t a single other actor who was equipped with both this sorrow and this cool crispness the way that Raizō was.”

Tadao Satō said of Raizō's acting, that whether in jidaigeki or in modern dramas, “whether the most miserable role or the most comedic, he acted with elegance and lent sophistication and grace to the final product.” Film critic Saburō Kawamoto said of Raizō's acting, “even when he’s here, he’s not here,” and clarified, “even in this filthy world, there was a sense of purity about him, as though he were a glimpse into a faraway place.” “Some people might take my saying ‘sense of purity’ as some sort of posturing phrase, but it's not.”

Two of Raizō’s contemporaries, Sakata Tōjūrō IV and Nakamura Jakuemon IV, also attempted to change careers from kabuki to film, but failed to find success and returned to the kabuki stage. When asked his thoughts on this, Akinari Suzuki said that he felt that Raizō had found success in film because he was not steeped in kabuki in his young childhood, and thus avoided being totally stained by it.

=== Appearance ===
Raizō usually looked plain, not eye-catching, but when his makeup was applied for a film shoot he would completely transform. Many people in the film industry spoke about this particular quirk.

According to Arashi Ichikawa, Raizō’s essence was “hardness divided by simplicity”. In contrast to other stars, Raizō's unmade-up simplicity “would transform completely with makeup,” he said of this peculiar quirk. According to Akira Inoue, when given makeup Raizō's usual appearance would become completely different and beautiful. Tokuō Tanaka said, “this guy, with his disarming warmth and aura of purity; as soon as work began he’d transform into an actor, he’d stiffen his shoulders and become immediately commanding, steadfast, dignified and strikingly good-looking. For someone like me who knew his usual face, it my eyes would pop open in surprising.”

According to Inoue, at the time of his debut, Raizō, along with Shintarō Katsu and Takeshi Hanayagi, received makeup instruction from the star Kazuo Hasegawa. The other two actors applied their makeup exactly as told, but Raizō alone had a number of points where he made personal alterations to the makeup plan. In particular, Raizō's original designs could be seen in the makeup around his eyes and eyebrows. Furthermore, Raizō carried out the most important points of his makeup application himself, and wouldn't allow anyone to see him while doing it. Inoue theorizes that the application of makeup was a crucial part of his process for immersing himself in a role, and thus he didn't want to be observed while doing so.

Yoshio Shirasaki, screenwriter of Kōshoku Ichidai Otoko (First-generation Lecher), said of Raizō's transformation that he normally looked like a company man, but “when he appeared on the screen he’d have undergone a complete change; and in the midst of all the light was this youthful star, fighting against emptiness and loneliness.” Inoue said that the reason that so many of Raizō's movie posters feature an image of him from behind with his head turned to face the camera was because many directors felt that this view of him best showed off his "intriguing emptiness".

== Parallels and Comparison to Shintarō Katsu ==
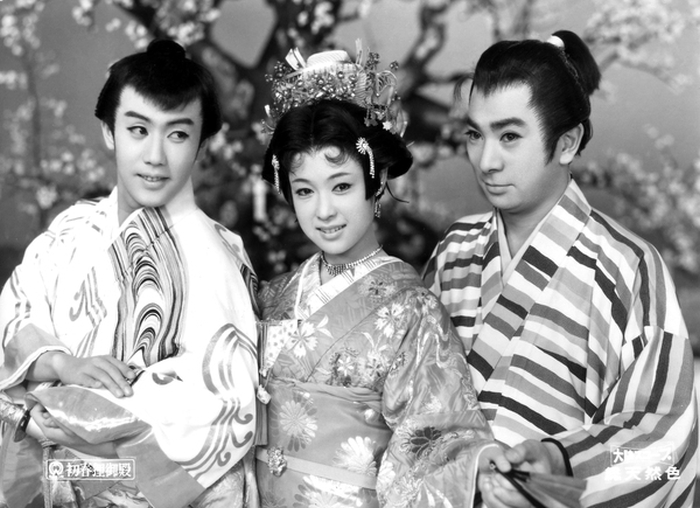
Raizō, Ayako Wakao, and Shintaro Katsu (1959)

Raizō, as written above, was the son of Ichikawa Kudanji III, a supporting actor by trade, and for a time was known as Ichikawa Enzō II. Shintarō Katsu was the son of Kineya Katsutōji, a nagauta performer and shamisen player, and for a time was known as Kineya Katsumaru II. Both Raizō and Katsu signed on with Daiei in 1954, and joined the company in the same term. Both born in 1931, having made a hurried transition from kabuki to the new world of film, there were many similar circumstances about the pair of young actors.

As previously mentioned, Daiei's management intended from the start to position Raizō as a successor to the star Kazuo Hasegawa, and it “proceeded smoothly along the tracks.” Tokuzō Tanaka shared the opinion that Katsu, who was the first of the two to make his debut, was “like a second helping of Hasegawa” when he played an attractive young man in his white-faced film makeup; but as the director and supporting cast could hardly be described as first-rate, it was a long time before Katsu managed to become a real success.

It wasn't until the 1960s and the release and success of the Akumyō and Zatoichi series that Katsu became widely discussed and surpassed Raizō in earnings. Akinari Suzuki said of Katsu, “It wasn’t until after shooting 70 or 80 films without a single real hit, that he finally became of use with the release of Akumyō.” According to Tokuzō Tanaka, audience reception to Shiranui Kengyō, released in 1960, was particularly terrible, despite Katsu's highly acclaimed performance, to the point that Tanaka received complaints from movie theater owners about his constant use of Katsu in his films. Reflecting on the state of things in 1959, Katsu said “The banzuke was totally different,” referring to the document listing sumo wrestlers’ ranks before a tournament. “We already knew that Raizō was an ōzeki or a yokozuna. I still hadn’t entered the san’yaku,” meaning that Raizō could be considered to be among the very highest regarded stars, while Katsu was still a relative unknown.

Eventually the pair became treated as a unit, with the name “KATSURAISU,” taking Katsu's surname and the first half of Raizō's given name to create a name which happened to sound like the food dish “katsu rice.” When the two appeared on movie posters and in films together under this slogan, they were often made to appear in contrast to one another in their appearance and style, and it was widely believed that there was a strong rivalry between them. However, their usage of friendly nicknames like “Rai-chan” and “Katchan” for each other indicates that their relationship certainly wasn't bad, and in fact might even have been quite friendly. In fact, Raizō had a close friendship with Katsu's wife, Tamao Nakamura, from childhood, as her father, Nakamura Kanjirō II, was a Kansai-based kabuki actor like Raizō's adopted fathers.

The author Tomomi Muramatsu indicated that for Raizo, who had “worriedly spent his days in the world of kabuki, which is so dominated by lineage and ceremony, without ever receiving a large role,” and Katsu, whose father had been involved in the backstage world of kabuki, shared “the same complex, this large problem to be solved,” and that they were both equipped with “a similar factor which served as a sort of energy source” for them.

Acting Style and Ability
Raizō was known for constantly offering all manner of suggestions during the pre-production process, and thus acquired the nickname “Goterai,” seemingly a pun on goteru, a Japanese word meaning “to fuss about, to harp on.” However, once he was satisfied in his understanding, he never complained or grumbled, and once filming began he would stop making these sorts of suggestions altogether. On the other hand, Katsu would go through the entire pre-production phase without saying a word, but start making suggestions and impromptu changes as soon as filming began which was a frequent source of trouble for the staff of his films.
According to Akira Inoue, Raizō was quite capable of working together with the methodologies of various directors when acting. For example, even within the same Nemuri Kyōjiro series, the films made under different directors are said to have a different flavor to them. On the other hand he said when speaking of Katsu, “When it comes to Zatoichi, it’s Katchan’s Zatoichi, in all of them.” Akinari Suzuki has made similar statements regarding the two actors. Tomomi Muramatsu, said that Katsu was the kind of actor where “no matter what he does, it always ends up in the vein of Shintarō Katsu,” but that Raizō, even though he was established as a mainstream Japanese film star in the ranks of Kazuo Hasegawa and Chiezō Kataoka, would always be very flexible and receptive to direction, which was highly unusual for the stars of that era.
Tokuzō Tanaka, who directed films with both actors, compared their fighting scenes speaking largely favorably of Raizō, “his lower body always feels somewhat undetermined, but despite that his movement is quite real enough;” but he had to declare Katsu the superior of the two, saying “Katchan is just unbelievably agile.”
Personality
According to Kazuo Ikehiro, even when working with someone he didn’t like, Katsu could “usually manage to get along,” but “when [Raizō] disliked someone, he disliked them completely” to the point where there had been cases when he had said “I don’t even want to see your face” directly to someone. Ikehiro said that Raizō was particularly bothered by people who took their jobs lightly and did sloppy work.
Speaking of their interactions with other film staff Yoshinobu Nishioka, who worked as a production designer on many of Daiei’s films, said that Katsu was the sort to go out drinking with other actors, while Raizō would often socialize with the production staff. Tokuzō Tanaka corroborates, saying that Raizō was incredibly friendly and helpful with the staff, often inviting people to his home for dinner and other such activities. According to Seiji Hoshikawa, Raizō didn’t much like “glitzy and neon-decked or famous restaurants,” but instead “would nearly always eat regular restaurants, without any regards to social standing,” where he would “happily argue and discuss life and films.”
Fujio Morita, who served as cinematographer on Raizō’s Nemuri Kyoshirō: Enjō-ken and Katsu’s Zatoichi: Nitan-kiri at about the same time, said of their personalities that Raizō was very diligent and serious, while describing Katsu as desperate.

== Filmography ==
The filmography of Ichikawa Raizō includes 158 films:

=== 1950s ===
(1950s is complete)

- 1954: The Great White Tiger Platoon (花の白虎隊, Hana no Byakkotai)
- 1954: Zenigata Heiji: Ghost Lord (銭形平次捕物控 幽霊大名, Zenigata Heiji Torimono-Hikae: Yūrei Daimyō)
- 1954: The Princess Sen (千姫, Sen Hime)
- 1954: Onatsu and Seijuro (歌ごよみ お夏清十郎, Utagoyomi Onatsu Seijūrō)
- 1954: The Young Swordsman (潮来出島 美男剣法, Shiode Kushima Binan Kenpō)
- 1955: The Second Son (次男坊鴉, Jinanbō Garasu)
- 1955: The Magistrate (次男坊判官, Jinanbō Hangan)
- 1955: The Young Lord (鬼斬り若様, Onikiri Wakasama)
- 1955: A Girl Isn't Allowed to Love (薔薇はいくたびか, Bara Ikutabika) a.k.a. The Rose Again
- 1955: The Dancer and Two Warriors (踊り子行状記, Odoriko Gyōjōki)
- 1955: The Magical Warrior (綱渡り見世物侍, Tsuna Watari Misemono Zamurai)
- 1955: Taira Clan Saga a.k.a. The Taira Clan, lit. "New Tale of the Heike" (新・平家物語, Shin Heike Monogatari)
- 1955: The Iroha Elegy (いろは囃子, Iroha Bayashi)
- 1955: Thief and Magistrate (怪盗と判官, Kaitō to Hangan)
- 1956: Migratory Birds of the Flowers (花の渡り鳥, Hana no Wataridori)
- 1956: Matashirō Fighting Journey (又四郎喧嘩旅, Matashirō Kenka-tabi)
- 1956: Renyasai Yagyū Hidden Story (柳生連也斎 秘伝月影抄, Yagyū renyasai: hidentsuki kageshō)
- 1956: Asatarō (浅太郎鴉, Asatarō garasu)
- 1956: Fighting Birds (喧嘩鴛鴦, Kenka Oshidori)
- 1956: Flowery Brothers (花の兄弟, Hana no Kyōdai)
- 1956: Flowery Hood 1 (花頭巾, Hana Zukin)
- 1956: Zenigata Heiji: Human-skin Spider (銭形平次捕物控 人肌蜘蛛, Zenigata Heiji Torimono no Hikae: Hitohada Gumo)
- 1956: Travel Chronicles of Yaji and Kita (弥次喜多道中記, Yaji-Kita Dōchū-ki)
- 1956: Hanpeita Tsukigata (月形半平太 花の巻 嵐の巻, Tsukigata Hanpeita: Hana no maki; Arashi no maki)
- 1956: Flowery Hood 2 (続花頭巾, Zoku Hana Zukin; a.k.a. Hana Zukin II)
- 1956: Fighting Fire Fighter (あばれ鳶, Abare Tobi)
- 1956: Gonpachi (編笠権八, Amigasa Gonpachi)
- 1957: An Osaka Story (大阪物語, Ōsaka monogatari)
- 1957: Love of a Princess (朱雀門, Suzakumon)
- 1957: Floating Vessel (Ukifune) a.k.a. "Tale of Genji Ukifune" (源氏物語 浮舟, Genji Monogatari Ukifune)
- 1957: Fighting Letter for 29 People (二十九人の喧嘩状, Nijūkyū-nin no Kenka-jō)
- 1957: Yatarō’s Travel Hat (弥太郎笠, Yatarō gasa)
- 1957: Tengu Mangorō (万五郎天狗, Mangorō Tengu)
- 1957: Inazuma Kaidō (稲妻街道, Inazuma Kaidō)
- 1957: A Fantastic Tale of Naruto (鳴門秘帖, Naruto Hichō)
- 1957: Demonfire Palanquin (鬼火駕籠, Onibi Kago)
- 1957: Freelance Samurai (桃太郎侍, Momotarō zamurai)
- 1958: Princess Tsuki (月姫系図, Tsukihime keizu)
- 1958: Magnificent Five (遊侠五人男, Yūkyō Gonin Otoko)
- 1958: Hanatarō (花太郎呪文, Hanatarō Jumon)
- 1958: The Loyal 47 Ronin (忠臣蔵, Chūshingura)
- 1958: Tabi wa Kimagure Kaze Makase (旅は気まぐれ風まかせ)
- 1958: Inochi wo Kakeru Otoko (命を賭ける男)
- 1958: The 7th Secret Courier for Edo (七番目の密使, Nanabanme no Misshi)
- 1958: Megitsune Buro (女狐風呂)
- 1958: The Swishing Sword a.k.a. Human Skin Peacock (人肌孔雀, Hitohada Kujaku)
- 1958: Conflagration or Flame of Torment or The Temple of the Golden Pavilion (炎上, Enjō)
- 1958: A Man of Many Miracles (日蓮と蒙古大襲来, Nichiren to mōko daishūrai; lit. "Nichiren and the Great Mongol Invasion")
- 1958: Nuregami kenpō (濡れ髪剣法)
- 1958: Ambush at Iga Pass (伊賀の水月, Iga no suigetsu)
- 1958: Benten Kozō (弁天小僧, Benten Kozō)
- 1958: Bakeneko goyō da (化け猫御用だ)
- 1959: Smooth Tree Peony (人肌牡丹, Hitohada botan)
- 1959: Yūtarō kōdan (遊太郎巷談)
- 1959: Her Highness Princess Snake (蛇姫様, Hebi-himesama)
- 1959: Lord Nobunaga's Early Days (若き日の信長, Wakaki hi no Nobunaga)
- 1959: Ojō kichisa (お嬢吉三)
- 1959: The Gaijin (山田長政 王者の剣, Yamada Nagamasa Ōja no ken)
- 1959: The One-thousand Crane Secret File (千羽鶴秘帖, Dewa tsuru hichō)
- 1959: Jirō Nagafuji (次郎長富士)
- 1959: Attack of Jean Arima (ジャン有馬の襲撃, Jan Arima no shūgeki)
- 1959: Wet-Hair Sando Hat (濡れ髪三度笠, Nuregami sandogasa)
- 1959: Stop the Old Fox (かげろう絵図, Kagerō ezu)
- 1959: Samurai Vendetta (薄桜記, Hakuōki)
- 1959: Ukare sandogasa (浮かれ三度笠)
- 1959: Enchanted Princess 初春狸御殿 (Hatsuharu tanuki goten)

=== 1960s ===
(1960s incomplete)

- 1960: Bonchi
- 1960: The Demon of Mount Oe
- 1960: Jirocho the Chivalrous
- 1960: Satan's Sword (Daibosatsu Tōge)
- 1960: Satan's Sword II (Daibosatsu Tōge no Make)
- 1961: Satan's Sword III (Daibosatsu Tōge Kanketsu-Hen)
- 1961: The Gambler's Code (Kutsukake Tokijiro)
- 1961: A Lustful Man
- 1962: Ninja 1 (Shinobi no mono)
- 1962: The Great Wall (Shin shikōtei)
- 1962: Fencing Master (Tateshi Danpei)
- 1962: 170 Leagues to Edo (Edo e hyakku-nana-jū ri)
- 1962: Destiny's Son (Kiru)
- 1962: Nakayama shichiri
- 1962: The Outcast (Hakai)
- 1962: Onnakeizu
- 1963–1969: Sleepy Eyes of Death film series include 12 films starring Raizo Ichikawa
  - 1963 Enter Kyōshirō Nemuri the Swordman
  - 1964: Nemuri Kyoshiro 2: Shōbu
  - 1964: Nemuri Kyoshiro 3: Engetsu Sapporo
  - 1969: Nemuri Kyōshirō Akujogari
- 1963: Yoso
- 1963: Ninja 3 (Shin Shinobi no Mono)
- 1963: Ninja 2 (Zoku shinobi no mono)
- 1963: Tenya wanya jirōchō dōchō
- 1963: Teuchi
- 1963: Daisanno kagemusha
- 1963: An Actor's Revenge (Yukinojo henge)
- 1964: Ninja 4 (Shinobi no Mono: Kirigakure Saizo)
- 1964: Ninja 5 (Shinobi no Mono: Zoku Kirigakure Saizo)
- 1964: The Sword (Ken)
- 1965: Ken Ki (Sword Devil)
- 1966: Dai Satsujin Orochi - The Betrayal
- 1967: A Certain Killer
- 1967: The Doctor's Wife
- 1968: Hitori okami

== Works cited ==
- 『雷蔵、雷蔵を語る』 (Raizō, Raizō ga Kataru) Ichikawa Raizō, Asuka Shinsha, 1995; Asahi Bunko 2003. Preface Yukio Mishima, foreword by Ōta Kōki (son), afterword by Hiroaki Fujii.
- 『雷蔵の色』 (Raizō no Iro) Tomomi Muramatsu, Kawade Shobo Shinsha Publishers inc, 2009.
- 『雷蔵好み』 (Raizō Konomi) Tomomi Muramatsu, Shueisha Inc, 2002; Shueisha Bunko, 2006.
- 『市川雷蔵』 (Ichikawa Raizō) Yoshiko Ishikawa (ed), San-ichi Publishing Co., Ltd, 1995.
- 『わたしの雷蔵』 (Watashi no Raizō) Yoshiko Ishikawa (ed), Kokushokankokai Inc, 2008.
- 『市川雷蔵出演映画作品ポスター集』 (Ichikawa Raizō Shutsuen Eaiga Sakuhin Posutaa-shū) Munenaga Awata (ed), Wides Publishing, 1999.
- 『写真集 市川雷蔵』 (Shashin-shū Ichikawa Raizō) Wides Publishing, 1999. Annotations: Tadanori Yokoo 「市川雷蔵の霊気」 (Ichikawa Raizō no Reiki), Mieko Kanai 「市川雷蔵の年」 (Ichikawa Raizō no Toshi).
- 『侍...市川雷蔵その人と芸』 ノーベル書房 (Samurai... Ichikawa Raizō Sono Hito to Gei – Nōberu Shobo), Nōberu Shobo, 1991.
- 『市川雷蔵とその時代』 (Ichikawa Raizō to Sono Jidai) Masaru Muro'oka (interviewer, layout), Tokuma Shoten Publishing Co., Ltd., 1993.
- 『完本市川雷蔵』 (Kanpon Ichikawa Raizō) Sadao Yamane (ed), AsahiGraph, 1994; Wides Publishin 1999.
- 『孤愁 市川雷蔵写真集』 (Koshū Ichikawa Raizō Shashin-shū) MAGAZINE HOUSE, Ltd., 1991.
- 『甦る!市川雷蔵 限定秘蔵版』 (Yomigaeru! Ichikawa Raizō Gentei Hizō-ban) Kindaieigasha Co., Ltd, 1992.
- 『市川雷蔵の映画と時代』 (Ichikawa Raizō no Eiga to Jidai) Sunday Mainichi, The Mainichi Newspapers Co., Ltd., 1990.
- 『市川雷蔵 RAIZO 秘蔵傑作スチール・スナップ』 (Ichikawa Raizō RAIZO Hizō Kessaku Suchiiru Sunappu) Victor Books, JVCKENWOOD Victor Entertainment Corp., 1992 ビクターブックス, 1992
- 『市川雷蔵 銀幕の貴公子よ永遠に』 (Ichikawa Raizō Ginmaku no Kikōshi yo Eien ni) RoRaiKai (Raizō Fan Club), Hagashoten, 1983.
- 『RAIZO「眠狂四郎」の世界』 (RAIZO "Nemuri Kyoshirō" no Sekai) <Rekishi Dokuhon spechial printing, 1994>, Shinjin Butsuō Raisha. Commemorative publishing 25 years after Ichikawa Raizō's death.
