= Zenigata Heiji: Human-skin Spider =

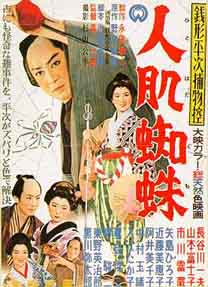
- Japanese movie poster
- Distributed by: Daiei Film
- Release date: 14 August 1956 (Japan)
- Running time: 82 minutes
- Country: Japan
- Language: Japanese

Zenigata Heiji: Human-skin Spider (Japanese: 銭形平次捕物控 人肌蜘蛛, Hepburn: Zenigata Heiji Torimono no Hikae: Hitohada Gumo) is a 1956 Japanese film directed by Kazuo Mori.

== Cast ==
- Kazuo Hasegawa
- Ichikawa Raizō VIII
- Fujiko Yamamoto
- Michiko Saga
- Eijiro Tono
