= The Loyal 47 Ronin (1958 film) =

1958 film

- Japanese movie poster
- Directed by: Kunio Watanabe
- Screenplay by: Kunio Watanabe; Fuji Yahiro; Masaharu Matsumura; Toshio Tamikado
- Produced by: Masaichi Nagata
- Cinematography: Takashi Watanabe
- Music by: Ichirō Saitō
- Production company: Daiei Film
- Distributed by: Daiei Film
- Release date: April 1, 1958 (Japan)
- Running time: 166 minutes
- Country: Japan
- Language: Japanese

The Loyal 47 Ronin (Japanese: 忠臣蔵, Hepburn: Chūshingura) is a 1958 color jidaigeki (period drama) Japanese film directed by Kunio Watanabe. With box office earnings of ¥410 million, it was the most successful film of 1958 in Japan. Furthermore, it was the second-highest-grossing film of the 1950s in Japan.

== Plot ==
The Loyal 47 Ronin tells the true tale of a group of samurai who became rōnin (leaderless samurai) after their daimyō (feudal lord) Asano Naganori was compelled to commit seppuku (ritual suicide) for assaulting a court official, Kira Yoshinaka, who had insulted him. After carefully planning for over a year, they execute a daring assault on their sworn enemy's estate, and exact their revenge, knowing that they themselves would be forced to share their Lord's fate to atone for their crime.

== Cast ==
- Kazuo Hasegawa as Ōishi Kuranosuke (Ōishi Yoshio)
- Shintaro Katsu as Genzō Akagaki
- Kōji Tsuruta as Kin'emon Okano
- Raizō Ichikawa as Takuminokami Asano
- Machiko Kyō as Orui
- Fujiko Yamamoto as Yōsen'in
- Michiyo Kogure as Ukihashi
- Chikage Awashima as Riku Ōishi
- Ayako Wakao as Osuzu
- Yatarō Kurokawa as Denpachirō Okado
- Eiji Funakoshi as Tsunanori Uesugi
- Eitaro Ozawa as Hyōbu Chisaka
- Takashi Shimura as Jūbei Ōtake
- Chieko Higashiyama as Ōishi's mother Otaka
- Tamao Nakamura as Asano's maid Midori
- Michiko Ai as Karumo
- Kazuko Wakamatsu as Osugi
- Aiko Mimasu as Toda
- Masao Shimizu as Dewanokami Yanagisawa
- Jun Tazaki as Ikkaku Shimizu
- Sonosuke Sawamura as Kazusanokami Sōda
- Yoshiro Kitahara as Jūjirō Hazama
- Kazuko Ichikawa as Chonmaru
- Gen Shimizu as Chūzaemon Yoshida
- Ichirō Amano as Mankichi
- Shinobu Araki as Yahei Horibe
- Toshio Chiba as Heihachirō Yamaoka
- Saburō Date as Jūheiji Sugino
- Keiko Fujita as Momiji
- Ryūji Fukui
- Yoichi Funaki as Yogorō Kanzaki
- Fujio Harumoto as Ukyōdayū Tamura
- Akiko Hasegawa as Okū - Ōishi's daughter
- Noriko Hodaka as Yūgiri
- Yukio Horikita as Shinpachirō Yamayoshi
- Ichirō Izawa as Isuke Maebara
- Ryōsuke Kagawa as Gengoemon Kataoka
- Hiroshi Kawaguchi as Chikara Ōishi
- Jun Negami as Sagaminokami Tsuchiya
- Nakamura Ganjirō II as Gorobei Kakimi
- Osamu Takizawa as Kōzukenosuke Kira

== See also ==
- Forty-seven rōnin
- The 47 Ronin (元禄忠臣蔵, Genroku Chūshingura) - 1941 film by Kenji Mizoguchi
- Daichūshingura (大忠臣蔵, Daichūshingura) - 1971 television dramatization
