= Nijūkyū-nin no Kenka-jō =

Japanese film

- Japanese movie poster
- Directed by: Kimiyoshi Yasuda
- Written by: Fuji Yahiro
- Produced by: Kazuyoshi Takeda
- Starring: Raizo Ichikawa; Michiko Saga; Shintaro Katsu; Michiko Ai; Narutoshi Hayashi
- Cinematography: Yukimasa Makita
- Music by: Nakaba Takahashi
- Production company: Daiei Film
- Release date: June 4, 1957 (Japan)
- Running time: 91 minutes
- Country: Japan
- Language: Japanese

Nijūkyū-nin no Kenka-jō (Japanese: 二十九人の喧嘩状; lit. Fighting Letter for 29 People) is a 1957 Japanese film directed by Kimiyoshi Yasuda.

== Cast ==
- Raizo Ichikawa
- Michiko Saga
- Shintaro Katsu
- Michiko Ai
- Narutoshi Hayashi
- Saburô Date
