= Yoshio Inaba =

Japanese actor (1920–1998)

- Born: July 15, 1920; Narita, Chiba, Japan
- Died: April 20, 1998 (aged 77)
- Occupation: Actor
- Years active: 1953–1989

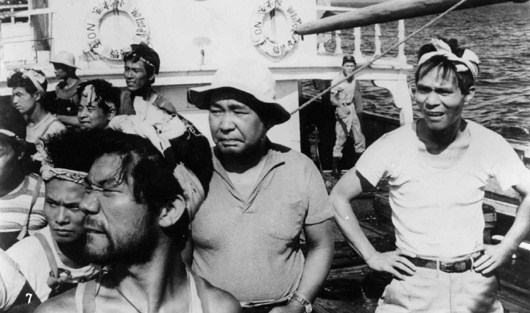
Jukichi Uno 5.jpg

Yoshio Inaba (稲葉 義男, Inaba Yoshio; July 15, 1920 – April 20, 1998) was a Japanese actor best known for his role as Gorobei in Akira Kurosawa's Seven Samurai. In addition to his career in film, Inaba was also a prolific theater actor and a member of the prestigious Haiyuza Theatre Company. He died of a heart attack at the age of 77.

== Filmography ==
=== Film ===
- Umi no hanabi (1951)
- Wakare-gumo (1951)
- Seven Samurai (1954) - Gorobei Katayama
- Horafuki tanji (1954) - Escaped Prisoner Iwagorō
- Verrat an Deutschland (1955) - Mijagi
- Samurai II: Duel at Ichijoji Temple (続宮本武蔵 一乗寺の決闘 Zoku Miyamoto Musashi: Ichijōji no kettō) (1955)
- Uruwashiki haha (1955) - Shigematsu
- Shujinsen (1956)
- Arashi (1956) - Detective of the special political police
- Mitsu-kubi-tou (1956) - Shōshichi Kitō
- Throne of Blood (1957) - Third Military Commander
- Ninjitsu (1957)
- Jun'ai Monogatari (1957) - Doctor at Nisseki Hospital
- Ballad of the Cart (1959) - Fujitaro
- Fires on the Plain (1959)
- Fujimi no otoko (1960)
- Haru no yume (1960) - Yamada
- Matsukawa-Jiken (1961)
- Gokai senryo yari (1961) - Shibata
- Kutsukake Tokijirō (1961) - Shōten
- Otoko to otoko no ikiru machi (1962) - Shizuo Iwasaki
- Woman of Design (1962) - Yasuda
- Destiny's Son (1962) - Giichirō Ikebe
- Harakiri (1962) - Jinai Chijiiwa
- Zoku rokunin shimai (1962)
- Yōsō (1963)
- Shikonmado - Dai tatsumaki (1964) - Ronin (uncredited)
- Ken (1964) - Seiichiro Kokubun
- The Scent of Incense - Nibu: Mitsumata no shō (1964)
- The Great Killing (1964)
- Nemuri Kyōshirō: Joyōken (1964) - Bizen-ya the Merchant
- Samurai Assassin (1965) - Keijiro Sumita
- Sleepy Eyes of Death: Sword of Satan (1965) - Mizuno
- Taiheiyō kiseki no sakusen: Kisuka (1965) - Tamai
- Kemonomichi (1965)
- The Guardman: Tokyo yōjimbō (1965) - Yoshida
- Gohiki no shinshi (1966)
- Onna no naka ni iru tanin (1966)
- The Guardman: Tokyo Ninja Butai (1966) - Yoshida
- Hikinige (1966)
- Ichiman sanzennin (1966)
- Rikugun Nakano gakko: Ryu-sango shirei (1967)
- Chichi to ko: Zoku Na mo naku mazushiku utsukushiku (1967)
- Nemuri Kyōshirō burai-hikae: Mashō no hada (1967)
- Rengō kantai shirei chōkan: Yamamoto Isoroku (1968) - Chief of Staff Ugaki
- Battle of the Japan Sea (1969) - Chief of Staff Officer Shimamura
- Kage no kuruma (1970)
- Wakamono no hata (1970)
- Stray Cat Rock: Beat '71 (1971) - Yoshitarō Araki
- Silence (1971) - Prisoner official
- Shinobu-ito (1973)
- Yajū gari (1973) - Onimaru
- Kaseki (1974)
- Karei-naru Ichizoku (1974) - Ichinose Factory's owner
- Castle of Sand (1974) - Search chief clerk
- Koi wa midori no kaze no naka (1974)
- Shōwa karesusuki (1975)
- Gokumon-tō (1977) - Village Mayor Makihei Araki
- Village of Eight Gravestones (1977) - Ochimusha
- Mitsuyaku: Gaimushō kimitsu rōei jiken (1978) - Nakada
- Kumokiri Nizaemon (1978) - Seizō
- Nihon no don: kanketsuhen (1978) - Satomi
- Mito Kōmon (1978) - Kihei
- Blue Christmas (1978)
- The Battle of Port Arthur (1980) - Ijichi Kōsuke
- Willful Murder (1981) - Horii
- Matagi (1982) - Kokichi Suzuki
- The Challenge (1982) - Instructor
- Battle Anthem (1983) - Kamimura
- Shōsetsu Yoshida Gakkō (1983) - Shūji Masutani
- Keiji monogatari 2 - Ringo no uta (1983) - Kenzo Tashiro
- Yōkirō (1983)
- Kita no hotaru (1984) - Bessho (final film role)

=== Television ===
- Taikōki (1965) as Katō Kiyotada
- Daichūshingura (1971) as Kajikawa Yoriteru
- Amigasa Jūbei (1974–75)
- Tōge no Gunzō (1982) as Inakichi
