= Ambush at Iga Pass =

1958 film

- Directed by: Kunio Watanabe
- Distributed by: Daiei Film
- Release date: November 15, 1958
- Running time: 99 minutes
- Country: Japan
- Language: Japanese

Ambush at Iga Pass (伊賀の水月, Iga no suigetsu) is a 1958 Japanese film directed by Kunio Watanabe.

== Cast ==
- Kazuo Hasegawa
- Narutoshi Hayashi
- Raizo Ichikawa
