= Yūkyō Gonin Otoko =

- Produced by: Daiei
- Release date: January 15, 1958
- Country: Japan
- Language: Japanese

Yūkyō Gonin Otoko Yūkyō Gonin Otoko (遊侠五人男) (unofficial English title: Magnificent Five) is a 1958 Japanese film.

== Cast ==
- Kazuo Hasegawa
- Raizo Ichikawa as Heizaburo Tsumaki
- Shintaro Katsu
