= Battle of the Japan Sea (film) =

1968 film about the Russo-Japanese War

- Theatrical release poster

Japanese name
- Kanji: 日本海大海戦
Transcriptions
- Revised Hepburn: Nihonkai Daikaisen
- Directed by: Seiji Maruyama
- Written by: Toshio Yasumi
- Produced by: Tomoyuki Tanaka
- Starring: Toshiro Mifune; Yūzō Kayama; Tatsuya Nakadai; Toshio Kurosawa; Makoto Satō; Ryutaro Tatsumi; Chishū Ryū; Matsumoto Kōshirō VIII
- Cinematography: Hiroshi Murai
- Edited by: Yoshitami Kuroiwa
- Music by: Masaru Sato
- Production company: Toho
- Distributed by: Toho
- Release date: August 1, 1969 (Japan)
- Running time: 127 minutes
- Country: Japan
- Language: Japanese
- Budget: ¥350 million
- Box office: ¥360 million

Battle of the Japan Sea (Japanese: 日本海大海戦, Hepburn: Nihonkai Daikaisen; lit. 'The Great Battle in the Japan Sea') is a 1969 Japanese epic war film directed by Seiji Maruyama, with special effects by Eiji Tsuburaya. The film stars Toshiro Mifune, Yūzō Kayama, Tatsuya Nakadai, Toshio Kurosawa, Makoto Satō, Ryutaro Tatsumi, Chishū Ryū, and Matsumoto Kōshirō VIII. In the film, the Imperial Japanese Navy and army fail in their attempts to seize Port Arthur, and the Russian Pacific Fleet bears down on the Japan Sea during the Russo-Japanese War.

The film was theatrically released in Japan by Toho on August 1, 1969, and earned ¥360 million, against a production budget of ¥350 million, during its theatrical run, making it the second-highest-grossing Japanese film of 1969.

== Production ==
=== Special effects ===
Battle of the Japan Sea was the last film for special effects director Eiji Tsuburaya before his death. (Note: Tsuburaya's credit on All Monsters Attack was honorary; he was not involved in that film's production.) A dedicated team of 60 artists worked on the 107 miniature ships created for the film. In addition, the miniature of the battleship Mikasa was made up to 13 meters long. Due to the weaker shell power during the Russo-Japanese War in the Pacific War, Freon gas was used to represent the water column in the naval battle scene.

== Release ==
Battle of the Japan Sea was distributed theatrically in Japan by Toho on August 1, 1969. During its theatrical release, the film earned ¥360 million. It was released on DVD in Japan on June 21, 2001, by Toho Home Video.

== Cast ==
- Toshiro Mifune as Tōgō Heihachirō
- Yūzō Kayama as Hirose Takeo
- Tatsuya Nakadai as Akashi Motojiro
- Makoto Satō as Abo Kiyokazu
- Akira Kubo as Kikuisami Matsui
- Susumu Fujita as Kamimura Hikonojō
- Eijiro Yanagi as Itō Hirobumi
- Akihiko Hirata as Tsunoda Koreshige
- Yoshifumi Tajima as Ijichi Hikojirō
- Kenji Sahara as Maruhashi Hikosaburo
- Jun Tazaki as Shimaji Hashiguchi
- Masao Shimizu as Totsuka Tamaki
- Ryuji Kita as Admiral Kataoka Shichirō
- Toru Abe as Lieutenant Colonel Suji Genjiro
- Kiyoshi Kodama as Captain Yamamoto Shinjiro
- Yoshio Inaba as Shimamura Hayao
- Yoshio Tsuchiya as Akiyama Saneyuki
- Chishū Ryū as Nogi Maresuke
- Matsumoto Kōshirō VIII as Emperor Meiji
- Ken Mitsuda as Yamagata Aritomo
- Shin Tatsuoka as Inoue Kaoru
- Takamaru Sasaki as Kuki Ryūichi
- Ryutaro Tatsumi as Yamamoto Gonnohyōe
- Toshio Kurisawa as Pfc. Maeyama
- Takeshi Katō as Chief of Staff Officer Katō
- Andrew Hughes as Zinovy Rozhestvensky
- Harold Conway as John Campbell
- Hans Horneff as Nikolai Kolomeitsev
- Peter Williams as Admiral Nebogatov
- Jacob Shapiro as Informant
- Ted Gunther as Shuriakusu
- Osman Yusuf as a Russian officer
- Mitsuko Kusabue as Mrs. Tōgō
- Haruo Nakajima as Staff of the First Fleet (uncredited)
- Robert Dunham as Aide to Admiral Alekseyev (uncredited)
- Ralph Jesser as Staff Officer of the Baltic Fleet (uncredited)
- Arthur Stark as Captain Svarov (uncredited)
- Akio Kusama as Minister, Resident who sees off the Hitachi Maru
- Jun Funato as Staff Officer Yamaoka
