= Eijirō Yanagi =

Japanese actor (1895–1984)

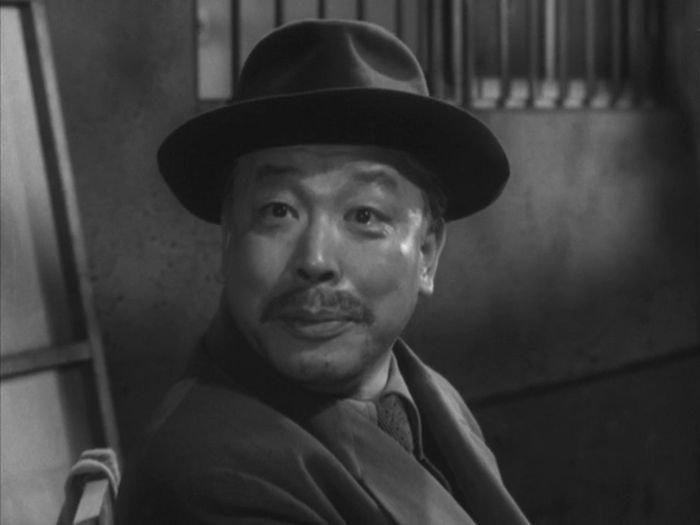
- Born: Takeshi Nagai; 16 September 1895; Tokyo or Hyōgo Prefecture, Japan (Note: The Kinema Junpo website gives Tokyo as place of birth, the Shochiku website Hyōgo Prefecture. Kotobank lists two sources, one of which gives Tokyo, the other Hyōgo Prefecture.)
- Died: 24 April 1984 (aged 88)
- Occupation: Actor
- Years active: 1913-1982

Eijirō Yanagi (柳永二郎, Yanagi Eijirō) (16 September 1895 – 24 April 1984) was a Japanese stage and film actor. He appeared in more than 160 films from 1940 to 1975.

== Career ==
A graduate of Ikubunkan Junior High School, Tokyo, Yanagi gave his stage debut at the Yutakuza theatre in 1913. After working with the troupes of Masao Inoue and Hanabishi Kawamura, and moving from shingeki to shinpa theatre, he formed the Shinsei Shinpa theatre company with Shōtaro Hanayagi and others in 1938, in which he was active for the next ten years. He also wrote books on shinpa theatre.

Yanagi was also a busy supporting actor in films in the 1950s and 1960s, appearing in works of directors such as Kenji Mizoguchi, Yasujiro Ozu, Mikio Naruse, Akira Kurosawa and Heinosuke Gosho. He made his final film appearance in 1975 and gave his final stage performance in 1982.

== Selected filmography ==
Year	Title	Role
1943	The Song Lantern	
1951	Miss Oyu	
1951	Ginza Cosmetics	
1951	The Idiot	
1952	The Flavor of Green Tea over Rice	
1952	The Life of Oharu	
1953	Epitome	Nagase
1953	A Japanese Tragedy	Iwami
1953	Life of a Woman	
1955	Tōjūrō no Koi	
1955	The Phantom Horse	
1955	Takekurabe	Owner of Daikokuya
1955	Shin Heike Monogatari	
1956	Koi Sugata Kitsune Goten	
1957	Suzakumon	
1957	Floating Vessel	
1958	Night Drum	
1961	Akō Rōshi	
1961	Hunting Rifle	Uncle
1961	High Noon for Gangsters	Satoshi
1962	The Mad Fox	
1962	The Tale of Zatoichi	
1962	The Tale of Zatoichi Continues	
1962	Destiny's Son	
1963	An Actor's Revenge	
1963	Bushido, Samurai Saga	
1968	The Sands of Kurobe	
1968	Admiral Yamamoto	Osami Nagano
1969	Battle of the Japan Sea	Itō Hirobumi
1975	Kenji Mizoguchi: The Life of a Film Director	Himself
