= The Second Son =

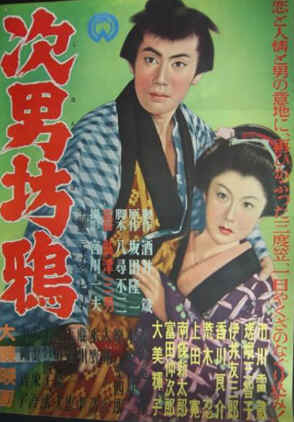
- Japanese movie poster
- Directed by: Mitsuo Hirotsu
- Starring: Ichikawa Raizō VIII; Michiko Saga; Tomosaburō Li
- Music by: Urato Watanabe
- Production company: Daiei Film
- Release date: January 29, 1955 (Japan)
- Running time: 75 minutes
- Country: Japan
- Language: Japanese

The Second Son (Japanese: 次男坊鴉, Hepburn: Jinanbō Garasu) is a 1955 black-and-white Japanese film directed by Mitsuo Hirotsu.

== Cast ==
- Ichikawa Raizō VIII
- Michiko Saga
- Tomosaburō Li (伊井友三郎)
- Ryōsuke Kagawa
- Shinobu Araki
- Hiroshi Ueda
- Teruko Ōmi
