= Jun Tazaki =

Japanese actor (1913–1985)

- 田崎 潤
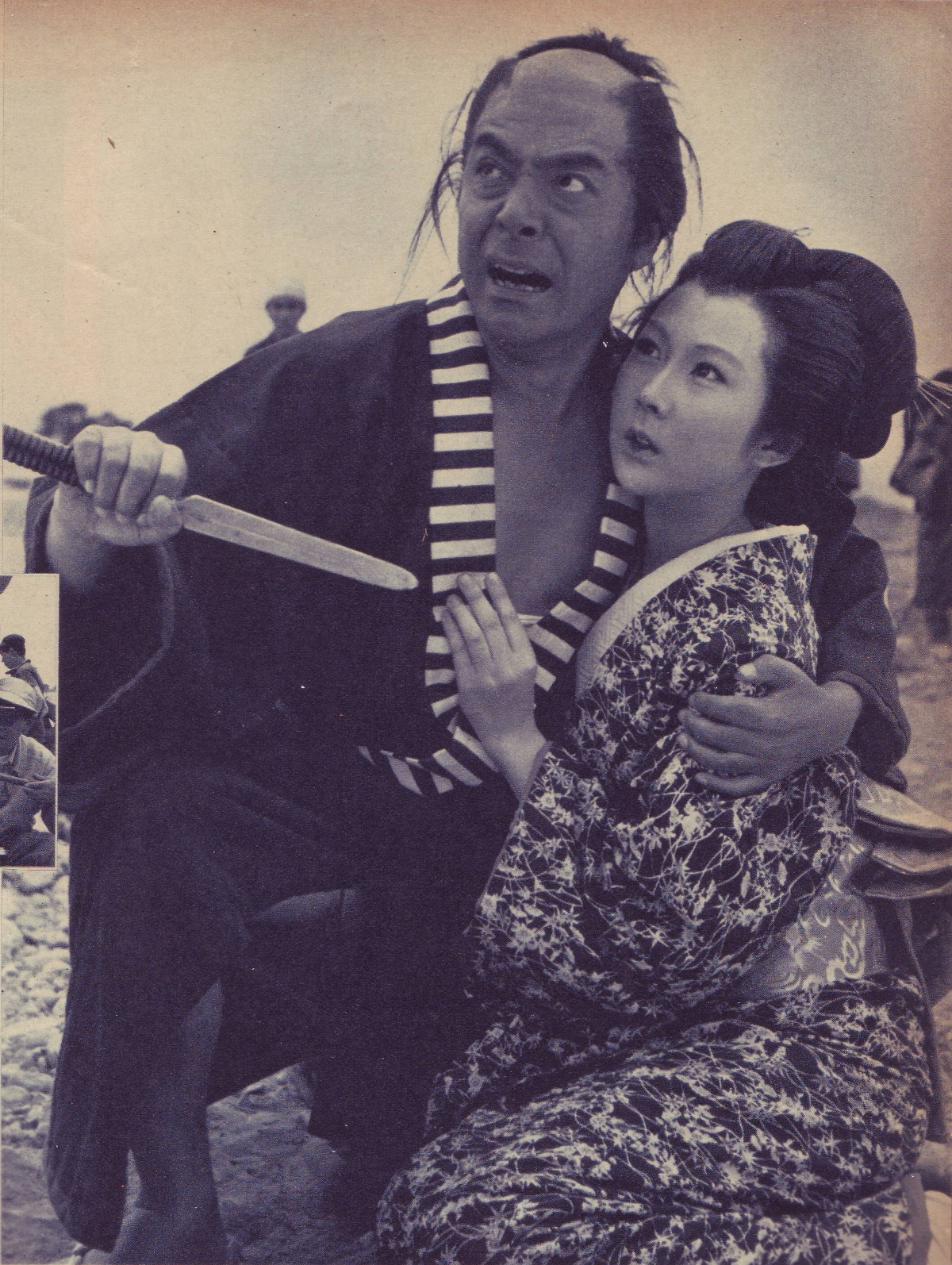
- Jun Tazaki with Michiko Saga in Gero no Kubi (1955)
- Born: Minoru Tanaka; 28 August 1913
- Died: 18 October 1985 (aged 72)
- Occupation: Actor
- Years active: 1948–1985
- Known for: Kaiju films

Jun Tazaki (田崎 潤, Tazaki Jun; 28 August 1913 – 18 October 1985), born Minoru Tanaka, was a Japanese actor best known for his various roles in kaiju films produced by Toho, often portraying scientists or military personnel.

== Career ==
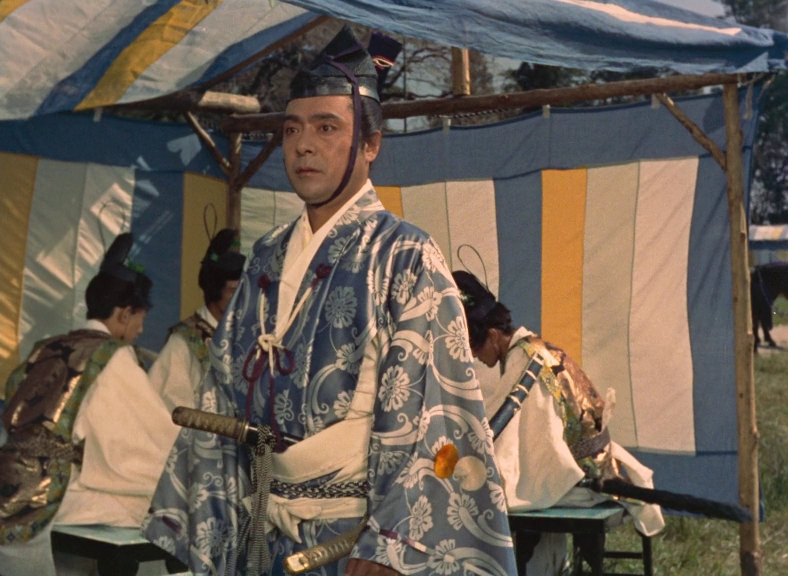
Jun Tazaki in Gate of Hell (地獄門) (1953)

Tanaka began his career as a traveling stage actor in the 1930s, performing under both his birth name and various stage names. In 1950, he changed his name to Jun Tazaki when he appeared in Shintoho's film Sasameyuki. After initially holding only small film roles, Tazaki gradually gained popularity and began playing larger roles in films produced by Toho in the 1960s. Akira Kurosawa frequently cast Tazaki in his films, but Ishirō Honda also considered him a favorite. Toho's science fiction films, particularly those directed by Honda, featured him throughout the 1960s as an authority figure with a moustache. As well as playing stern but benevolent father figures, Tazaki played villains with a ruthless streak. His defining role came in Honda's Atragon, in which he portrayed the embittered World War II veteran Hachiro Jinguji, forced to engage the submarine Gotengo, to combat an invasion by the underwater-dwelling Muans. In the 1970s, Tazaki stopped taking science fiction roles, but he continued to act until 1985, when he died of lung cancer.

== Selected filmography ==
=== Film ===
- 1948: Nikutai no mon
- 1949: Enoken no kentokyo ichidai ki
- 1950: Sasameyuki – Yonekichi Itakura, the photographer
- 1950: Kimi to yuku America kôro
- 1950: Banana musume
- 1950: Akatsuki no tsuiseki
- 1950: Yoru no hibotan – Yoshioka
- 1950: Mittsu no kekkon
- 1950: Tokyo File 212
- 1951: Wakasama samurai torimonochô: noroi no ningyôshi
- 1951: Kaizoku-sen
- 1951: Takaharu no eki yo sayônara
- 1951: Bungawan soro
- 1951: Kanketsu Sasaki Kojirô: Ganryû-jima kettô – Matabê Takada
- 1952: Okuni to Gohei – Iori, Okuni's husband
- 1952: Ukigumo nikki
- 1952: Rikon – Kensaku – Tazaki
- 1952: Shimizu no Jirocho den
- 1952: Geisha warutsu
- 1952: Jirochô sangokushi: nagurikomi kôjinyama
- 1953: Chinsetsu Chûshingura
- 1953: Jirochô sangokushi: Jirochô hatsutabi
- 1953: Oyabaka hanagassen
- 1953: Koibito-tachi no iru machi – Michita Kuraishi
- 1953: Kinsei mei shôbu monogatari: Hana no Kôdôkan – Ryûkichi Kimura
- 1953: Haresugata: Izu no Satarô
- 1953: Jirochô sangokushi: Jirochô to Ishimatsu
- 1953: Daibosatsu Tôge - Dai-san-bu: Ryûjin no maki; Ai no yama no maki – Yonetomo
- 1953: Jirochô sangokushi: seizoroi Shimizu Minato
- 1953: Hakucho no kishi
- 1953: Gate of Hell – Kogenta
- 1953: Jirochô sangokushi: nagurikomi kôshûji
- 1954: Jirochô sangokushi: hatsu iwai Shimizu Minato
- 1954: Koina no Ginpei – Tsumeki no Unokichi
- 1954: Jirochô sangokushi: kaitô-ichi no abarenbô
- 1954: Jirochô sangokushi: Kôjinyama zenzen
- 1954: Konomura Daikichi – Genzaburo
- 1954: Banchô sara yashiki: Okiku to Harima
- 1955: Meiji ichidai onna – Minokichi
- 1955: Mekura neko
- 1955: Gerô no kubi – Nohei, vassal
- 1955: Gyakushu orochimaru
- 1955: Akagi no chi matsuri
- 1956: Abare andon
- 1956: Shachô santôhei
- 1956: Tekketsu no tamashii
- 1956: Shujinsen
- 1956: Kage ni ita otoko – Hachigorô
- 1956: Toyamâ kin-san torimonô-cho-kage ni ita otoko
- 1956: Gunshin Yamamoto gensui to Rengô kantai
- 1957: Arashi no naka no otoko – Karate expert
- 1957: Onna dake no machi
- 1957: Fûun kyû nari Ôsaka jô: Sanada jûyûshi sô shingun – Yukimura Sanada
- 1957: Kyôfu no dankon
- 1957: Kaidan iro zange: Kyôren onna shishô – Nizô
- 1957: Shukujo yokawa o wataru
- 1957: Ippon-gatana dohyô iri – Yahachi
- 1957: Shizukanaru otoko
- 1957: Yoru no kamome
- 1958: Ohtori-jo no hanayome – Higaki
- 1958: Ankoru watto monogatari utsukushiki aishu – Rickshaw
- 1958: The Loyal 47 Ronin – Ikkaku Shimizu
- 1958: Tabi wa kimagure kaze makase
- 1958: Okon no hatsukoi hanayome nanahenge
- 1958: Nora neko
- 1958: Onna-za murai tadaima sanjô
- 1959: Hitohada botan
- 1959: Kagerô-gasa – Tajima Sakamoto
- 1959: Onna to kaizoku - Yasu
- 1959: Kogan no misshi
- 1959: Moro no Ichimatsu yûrei dochu
- 1959: Bôfûken – Kawakami
- 1959: The Three Treasures – Ootomo's Kurohiko
- 1959: Edo no akutaro – Heisuke
- 1959: Koi yamabiko
- 1959: Kêisatsû-kan to bôryôku-dan
- 1960: The Last Gunfight – Otokichi Kozuka
- 1960: Hawai Middowei daikaikûsen: Taiheiyô no arashi – Captain
- 1960: The Demon of Mount Oe
- 1960: Aoi yaju – Ogawa
- 1960: Man Against Man – Boss Tsukamoto
- 1960: Ôzora no yarôdomo
- 1960: 'Akasaka no shimai' yori: yoru no hada – Jôji Akui
- 1961: The Story of Osaka Castle as Teikabo Tsutumi – Teikabo Tsutsumi
- 1961: Zenigata Heiji torimono hikae: Yoru no enma chô
- 1961: 'Nendo no omen' yori: kaachan
- 1961: Kaoyaku akatsukini shisu
- 1961: Kasen chitai – Shigemune
- 1961: Zoku shachô dochuki: onna oyabun taiketsu no maki
- 1961: Kurenai no umi
- 1961: Jigoku no kyôen – Kanzaburo Itami
- 1961: Witness Killed – Ichiro
- 1961: Hoero datsugokushu
- 1962: Gorath - Raizô Sonoda – Tomoko's father
- 1962: Doburoku no Tatsu – Kakibetsu
- 1962: Owari Jurocho ikka-Sanshita nicho kenju
- 1962: Dobunezumi sakusen
- 1962: Star of Hong Kong – Dr. Matsumoto
- 1962: Nippon musekinin jidai - Mr. Kuroda
- 1962: King Kong vs. Godzilla - General Masami Shinzo
- 1962: Sanbyakurokujugoya
- 1962: Yama-neko sakusen
- 1962: Chūshingura: Hana no Maki, Yuki no Maki – Kiken Murakami
- 1962: Ankokugai no kiba
- 1963: Attack Squadron! – Commander
- 1963: Shinsengumi shimatsuki – Kamo Serizawa
- 1963: Nippon jitsuwa jidai
- 1963: High and Low – Kamiya, National shoes publicity director
- 1963: Sengoku yarô
- 1963: Chintao yôsai bakugeki meirei
- 1963: Yojinbô ichiba
- 1963: Nippon ichi no iro otoko
- 1963: Hiken
- 1963: Norainu sakusen
- 1963: The Lost World of Sinbad – Itaka Tsuzuka of the Imperial Guards
- 1963: Atragon - Captain Hachiro Jinguji
- 1964: Zoku shachô shinshiroku
- 1964: Kyô mo ware ôzora ni ari
- 1964: Mothra vs. Godzilla – Maruta, Chief editor
- 1964: Hibari, Chiemi, Izumi: Sannin yoreba
- 1964: Hadaka no jûyaku – Imaizumi, Executive
- 1964: Chi to daiyamondo – Utsuki
- 1964: Dogara, the Space Monster – chief inspector
- 1964: Ware hitotsubu no mugi naredo
- 1964: Kokusai himitsu keisatsu: Kayaku no taru – Dr. Tatsuno
- 1964: Hana no oedo no musekinin
- 1964: Kwaidan – Kannai's colleague #1 ("Chawan no naka" segment)
- 1965: Taiheiyô kiseki no sakusen: Kisuka – Akune
- 1965: Frankenstein Conquers the World – Military advisor
- 1965: Hana no o-Edo no hôkaibô – Gensui Matsui
- 1965: Daiku taiheki
- 1965: Baka to Hasami
- 1965: Invasion of Astro-Monster – Dr. Sakurai
- 1966: Musekinin Shimizu Minato
- 1966: Izuko e
- 1966: Bangkok no yoru – Dr. Yamawaki
- 1966: Kiganjô no bôken – Innkeeper
- 1966: Jigoku no nora inu
- 1966: War of the Gargantuas – Army commander
- 1966: Godzilla vs. The Sea Monster – Red Bamboo commander
- 1966: Abashiri Bangaichi: Koya no taiketsu
- 1967: The Killing Bottle – President of Buddabal
- 1967: Abashiri bangaichi: Kettô reika 30 do – Nagamamushi, a miner
- 1967: Japan's Longest Day – Captain Yasuna Kozono – CO 302nd Air Group
- 1967: Otoko no shobu: kantô arashî
- 1967: Abashiri Bangaichi: Aku eno Chôsen – Gôzô Kadoma
- 1968: Zoku otoshimae – Kuroda
- 1968: Destroy All Monsters – Dr. Yoshida
- 1968: Wakamono yo chôsen seyo
- 1968: Wasureru monoka
- 1968: Kûsô tengoku – Boss
- 1969: Battle of the Japan Sea – Shimaji Hashiguchi
- 1969: Kiki kaikai ore wa dareda?! – Kumagorô Izawa
- 1970: Mekurano Oichi inochi moraimasu – Nadaaan
- 1970: Nippon ichi no yakuza otoko
- 1970: Botan to ryu
- 1976: Osharé daisakusen
- 1977: Hakkodasan
- 1977: Sanshiro Sugata
- 1978: Hakatakko junjô – Takeichi, Takeshi's dad
- 1981: Kaettekita wakadaishô
- 1981: The Imperial Navy
- 1983: Shōsetsu Yoshida gakkō – Banboku Ōno
- 1985: Ran – Seiji Ayabe (final film role)

=== Television ===
- 1965: Taikōki
- 1966: Minamoto no Yoshitsune
- 1966: Ultra Q – Director General Sakamoto
- 1969: Ten to Chi to – Takeda Nobutora
- 1973: Kunitori Monogatari
- 1973: Jumborg Ace
- 1974: Kamen Rider X – Professor Keitarou Jin (Keisuke's father)
- 1983: Tokugawa Ieyasu – Shimazu Yoshihiro
