= Megitsune Buro =

- Directed by: Yasuda Kimiyoshi
- Production company: Daiei Film
- Release date: July 13, 1958
- Running time: 87 minutes
- Country: Japan
- Language: Japanese

Megitsune Buro Megitsune Buro (女狐風呂) is a 1958 black-and-white Japanese film directed by Yasuda Kimiyoshi.

== Cast ==
- Raizo Ichikawa
- Michiko Saga (瑳峨三智子)
- Narutoshi Hayashi
- Yōko Uraji
