= Zenigata Heiji: Ghost Lord =

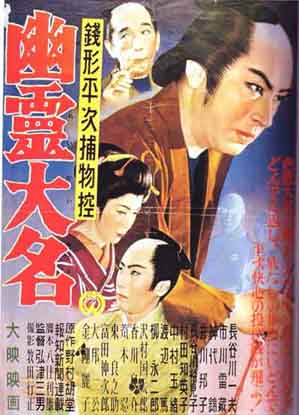
- Japanese movie poster
- Directed by: Mitsuo Hirotsu
- Produced by: Daiei
- Distributed by: Daiei
- Release date: 29 September 1954
- Running time: 90 minutes
- Country: Japan
- Language: Japanese

Zenigata Heiji: Ghost Lord (銭形平次捕物控 幽霊大名, Zenigata Heiji Torimono-Hikae: Yūrei Daimyō) is a 1954 black and white Japanese film directed by Mitsuo Hirotsu.

The film is one of many films about fictional character Zenigata Heiji.

== Cast ==
- Kazuo Hasegawa as Zenigata Heiji
- Raizo Ichikawa
- Yumiko Hasegawa (長谷川裕見子)
- Tamao Nakamura
