= Ken Mitsuda =

Japanese actor (1902–1997)

- 三津田 健
- Born: 29 April 1902; Tokyo, Japan
- Died: 28 November 1997 (aged 95)
- Occupation: Actor
- Years active: 1940–1983

Ken Mitsuda (29 April 1902 – 28 November 1997) was a Japanese film actor. He appeared in 53 films between 1940 and 1983.

== Selected filmography ==
- Snow White and the Seven Dwarfs (Grumpy) (voice Japanese version)
- Lady and the Tramp (Jock) (voice Japanese version)
- An Inlet of Muddy Water (1953)
- Sansho the Bailiff (1954)
- The Bad Sleep Well (1960)
- Enraptured (1961)
- The Threat (1966)
- Battle of the Japan Sea (1969)
- Time Bokan (1975) – Bucky/Grocky's father (voice)
- Yatterman (1977) – Manacky/Boyacky's father (voice)
- Shōsetsu Yoshida Gakkō (1983) – Kijūrō Shidehara
