= Gonpachi =

- Japanese movie poster
- Directed by: Kenji Misumi
- Written by: Masaharu Matsumura
- Produced by: Kazuyoshi Takeda
- Cinematography: Sōichi Aisaka
- Music by: Taichiro Kosugi
- Production company: Daiei Film
- Release date: 28 December 1956 (Japan)
- Running time: 65 minutes
- Country: Japan
- Language: Japanese

Gonpachi (Japanese: 編笠権八, Hepburn: Amigasa Gonpachi) is a 1956 black-and-white Japanese film directed by Kenji Misumi.

== Cast ==
- Ichikawa Raizō VIII
- Mieko Kondo
- Tokiko Mita
- Rieko Sumi
