= Onibi Kago =

- Film poster
- Directed by: Mitsuo Hirotsu
- Written by: Fuji Yahiro
- Produced by: Shin Sakai
- Starring: Raizo Ichikawa; Michiko Saga; Narutoshi Hayashi; Tamao Nakamura
- Cinematography: Yukimasa Makita
- Music by: Urato Watanabe
- Production company: Daiei Film
- Release date: 10 November 1957 (Japan)
- Running time: 87 minutes
- Country: Japan
- Language: Japanese

Onibi Kago (Japanese: 鬼火駕籠), also known as Demonfire Palanquin, is a 1957 black-and-white Japanese film directed by Mitsuo Hirotsu (弘津三男).

== Cast ==
- Raizo Ichikawa
- Michiko Saga
- Narutoshi Hayashi
- Tamao Nakamura
