= Yatarō gasa =

- Film poster
- Directed by: Kazuo Mori
- Written by: Fuji Yahiro
- Cinematography: Shozo Honda
- Music by: Ichirō Saitō
- Distributed by: Daiei Film
- Release date: July 2, 1957 (Japan)
- Running time: 94 minutes
- Country: Japan
- Language: Japanese

Yatarō gasa (Japanese: 弥太郎笠), also known as Yataro’s Travel Hat in English, is a 1957 color Japanese film directed by Kazuo Mori.

== Cast ==
- Raizo Ichikawa as Yatarō
- Michiyo Kogure as Okichi
- Saburo Date

== See also ==
- Kasa (hat)
