= Suzakumon (film) =

1957 film

- DVD cover
- Directed by: Kazuo Mori
- Written by: Matsutarō Kawaguchi (novel); Fuji Yahiro (screenplay)
- Produced by: Masaichi Nagata
- Cinematography: Kazuo Miyagawa
- Music by: Ichirō Saitō
- Production company: Daiei Film
- Release date: March 20, 1957 (Japan)
- Running time: 100 min.
- Country: Japan
- Language: Japanese

Suzakumon (Japanese: 朱雀門), also known as The Love of a Princess in English, is a 1957 color Japanese film directed by Kazuo Mori and based on a novel by Matsutarō Kawaguchi. At the 1957 Asia-Pacific Film Festival the film won awards for best film and best cinematography (Kazuo Miyagawa). The film also won a special award at the 1958 Mainichi Film Concours.

== Cast ==
- Ayako Wakao as Princess Kazu, a.k.a. Kazunomiya
- Raizo Ichikawa as Prince Arisugawa Taruhito
- Fujiko Yamamoto as Yuhide, Princess Kazu's waiting woman
- Shunji Natsume as Emperor Kōmei
- Kuniko Miyake as Tsuneko, Kazunomiya's mother
- Eijirō Tōno as Tomofusa Kunokura, Yuhide's father
- Eitaro Ozawa as Iwakura Tomomi (as Sakae Ozawa)
- Yoichi Funaki as Tokugawa Iemochi
- Toshio Hosokawa as Tokugawa Yoshinobu
- Masao Mishima as Sakai Tadaaki, the Kyoto Shoshidai
- Kikue Mōri as Honjuin, 13th Shogun's mother
- Kimiko Tachibana as Oriko
- Hisao Toake as Kujō Hisatada, the Kampaku
- Eijirō Yanagi as Ryuan, Yuhide's real father
- Hisako Takihana as Tenshō-in
- Seishirō Hara as Ōmura Masujirō
- Ryosuke Kagawa as Hashimoto Sanehisa, Kazunomiya's grandfather

== See also ==
- Suzakumon
