= The Great White Tiger Platoon =

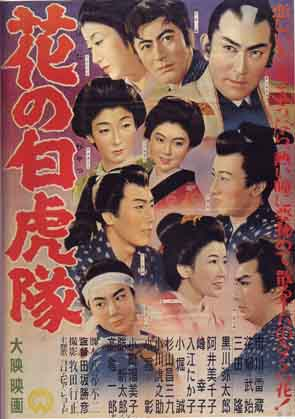
- Original Japanese movie poster
- Directed by: Katsuhiko Tasaka
- Written by: Fuji Yahiro
- Starring: Raizo Ichikawa; Takeharu Hanayagi; Shintaro Katsu
- Cinematography: Yukimasa Makita
- Edited by: Shigeo Nishida
- Music by: Urato Watanabe
- Production company: Daiei Film
- Release date: August 25, 1954 (Japan)
- Running time: 91 minutes
- Country: Japan
- Language: Japanese

The Great White Tiger Platoon (Japanese: 花の白虎隊, Hepburn: Hana no Byakkotai) is a 1954 Japanese film directed by Katsuhiko Tasaka.

== Cast ==
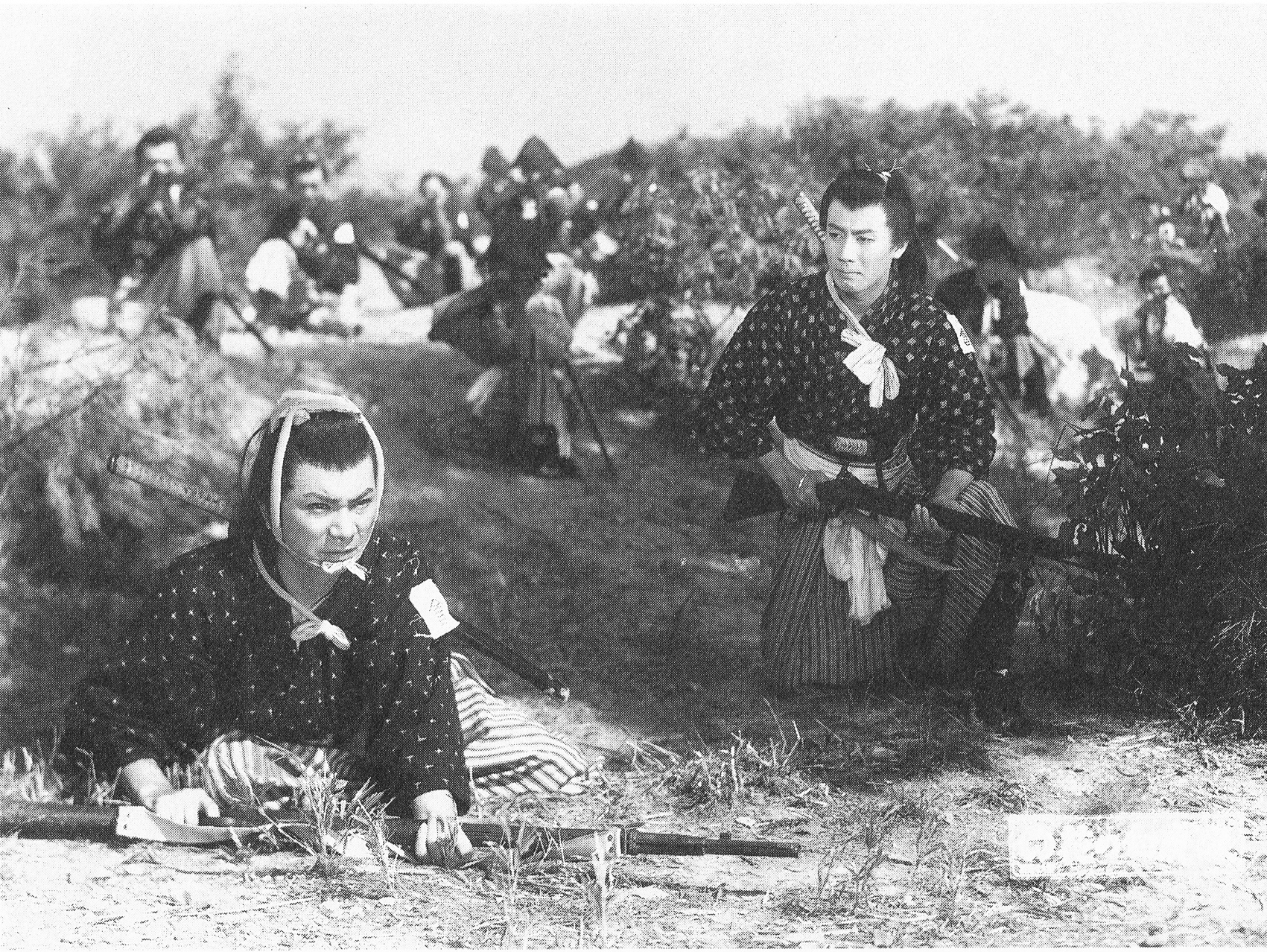
Shintaro Katsu and Raizo Ichikawa

- Raizo Ichikawa
- Takeharu Hanayagi (花柳武治)
- Shintaro Katsu

== See also ==
- Byakkotai (White Tiger Platoon)
