= Gate of Hell (film) =

1953 film by Teinosuke Kinugasa

Jigokumon
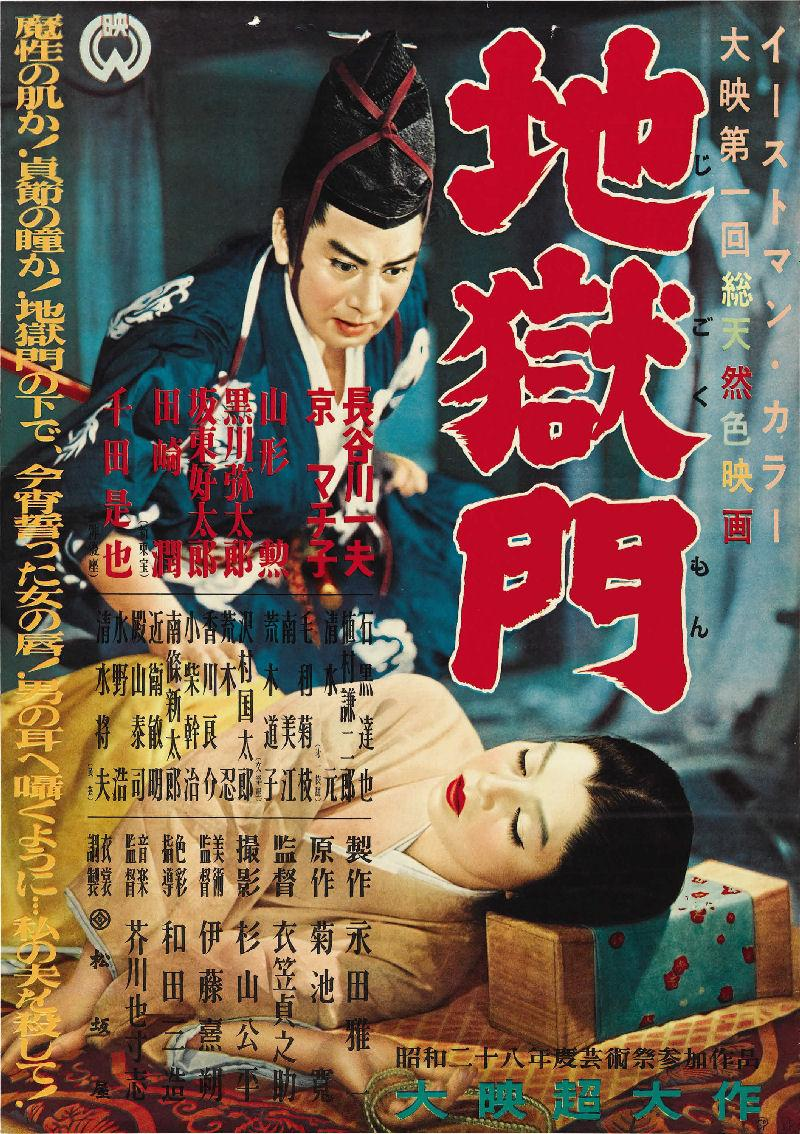
- Theatrical release poster
- Directed by: Teinosuke Kinugasa
- Written by: Teinosuke Kinugasa; Masaichi Nagata
- Based on: Kesa's Husband by Kan Kikuchi
- Produced by: Masaichi Nagata
- Starring: Kazuo Hasegawa; Machiko Kyō
- Cinematography: Kōhei Sugiyama
- Edited by: Shigeo Nishida
- Music by: Yasushi Akutagawa
- Color process: Eastmancolor
- Production company: Daiei Film
- Distributed by: Daiei Film
- Release date: October 31, 1953
- Running time: 86 minutes
- Country: Japan
- Language: Japanese
- Budget: ¥41.5 million (Note: The film had a direct production budget of approximately ¥41,479,000, with advertising and other expenses bringing its overall cost to ¥86,450,000.)
- Box office: ¥151.8 million (Japan) (Note: The film's exact Japanese gross was an estimated ¥151,790,000.) $500,000 (U.S.)

Gate of Hell (Japanese: 地獄門, Hepburn: Jigokumon) is a 1953 Japanese jidaigeki film directed by Teinosuke Kinugasa. It tells the story of a samurai (Kazuo Hasegawa) who tries to marry a woman (Machiko Kyō) he rescues, only to discover that she is already married. Filmed using Eastmancolor, Gate of Hell was Daiei Film's first color film and the first Japanese color film to be released outside Japan. It was digitally restored in 2011 by the National Film Center of the National Museum of Modern Art, Tokyo and Kadokawa Shoten Co., in cooperation with NHK. It was based on the play Kesa's Husband by Kan Kikuchi.

The film won Best Costume Design and Best Foreign Language Film at the 27th Academy Awards and the Grand Prize (the top prize of that year) at the 1954 Cannes Film Festival.

== Plot ==
During the Heiji Rebellion, samurai Endō Morito is assigned to escort lady-in-waiting Kesa away from the palace after she had volunteered to disguise herself as the daimyō’s sister, giving the daimyō’s father and real sister time to escape unseen. Kesa is knocked unconscious when the rebels attack their caravan, and Morito takes her to his brother’s home. When Morito’s brother arrives, he reveals that he too is part of the rebellion and suggests Morito join him. Morito refuses to betray the daimyō, Lord Kiyomori. Once he and Kesa are safe, Morito proves his loyalty to Kiyomori by personally riding to him to deliver news about the insurrection, including his brother's disloyalty.

After the coup has failed, Morito encounters Kesa again. Infatuated with her, he asks Lord Kiyomori, who is granting one wish to each of the loyal warriors who helped put down the rebellion, to grant him Kesa’s hand in marriage. He is informed that Kesa is already married to Wataru, a samurai of the Imperial Guard, but Morito demands that his wish be granted. Kesa is concerned by Morito's determination, but Wataru promises to protect her.

After hearing Kesa perform koto music, Lord Kiyomori begins to sympathize with Morito. He decides to give Morito a chance to compete for Kesa’s hand. Morito enters a horse race in which Wataru is competing, and outrides him. However, after the race is over, he nearly attacks Wataru at a “Forget the Race” dinner, visibly disturbing everyone around him.

Morito goes to speak to Kesa. At Kesa's request, her handmaid Tone tells Morito that Kesa has gone to visit her aunt. Morito goes to the aunt's home and discovers the lie. He forces the aunt to write a note to Kesa claiming she is ill and needs Kesa to come and see her. Kesa is terrified to find Morito waiting for her. When Morito threatens to kill Wataru and Kesa and her aunt if he cannot have his way, Kesa tells him she will fulfill his heart’s desires. She agrees to a plan for Morito to kill Wataru and claim her once she is widowed.

Kesa returns home and behaves generously to Tone and lovingly to Wataru. After everyone has gone to bed, Morito sneaks into the bedroom and kills the figure beneath the blankets with his sword. He is horrified to discover that he has killed Kesa. Realizing that Kesa has sacrificed herself rather than subject herself or anyone else to his insanity, Morito fruitlessly begs Wataru to kill him in penance. As Wataru mourns his dead wife, Morito kneels in the courtyard, cuts off his samurai topknot and vows to live thereafter as a monk.

== Cast ==
- Kazuo Hasegawa – Endo Morito
- Machiko Kyō – Lady Kesa
- Isao Yamagata – Wataru Watanabe
- Yatarō Kurokawa – Taira no Shigemori
- Kōtarō Bandō – Rokuroh
- Jun Tazaki – Kogenta
- Koreya Senda – Taira no Kiyomori
- Masao Shimizu – Fujiwara no Nobuyori
- Tatsuya Ishiguro – Yachuta
- Kenjirō Uemura – Masanaka
- Gen Shimizu – Saburosuke
- Michiko Araki – Mano
- Yoshie Minami – Tone
- Kikue Mōri – Sawa
- Ryōsuke Kagawa – Yasutada
- Kunitarō Sawamura – Moritada

== Production ==
- Yoshinobu Nishioka - Art director

== Reception ==
After the Japan Society sponsored a U.S. release of the film in December 1954, Bosley Crowther reviewed it for The New York Times. According to Crowther:

The secret, perhaps, of its rare excitement is the subtlety with which it blends a subterranean flood of hot emotions with the most magnificent flow of surface serenity. The tensions and agonies of violent passions are made to seethe behind a splendid silken screen of stern formality, dignity, self-discipline and sublime esthetic harmonies. The very essence of ancient Japanese culture is rendered a tangible stimulant in this film.

On Rotten Tomatoes, the film holds an approval rating of 92%, based on 13 reviews, with an average score of 8.3/10.

== Awards ==
Gate of Hell won the grand prize award at the 1954 Cannes Film Festival, a 1954 Academy Honorary Award for Best Foreign Language Film first released in the United States during 1954, along with the Academy Award for Best Costume Design, Color, and the 1954 New York Film Critics Circle Award for Best Foreign Language Film. It won the Golden Leopard at the Locarno International Film Festival.

== Home video ==
In the United Kingdom, Gate of Hell was released in 2012 on Blu-ray Disc and DVD as part of the Masters of Cinema line; the next year The Criterion Collection released it in the United States.

== See also ==
- List of jidaigeki films
- List of historical films set in Asia
