= Tsukihime keizu =

- Production company: Daiei Film
- Release date: January 9, 1958
- Country: Japan
- Language: Japanese

Tsukihime keizu (月姫系図), English title: Princess Tsuki, is a 1958 color Japanese film directed by Minoru Watanabe.

== Cast ==
- Raizo Ichikawa
