= Freelance Samurai =

1957 Japanese film

- Japanese movie poster
- Directed by: Kenji Misumi
- Written by: Fuji Yahiro
- Starring: Ichikawa Raizō VIII; Yoko Uraji; Seizaburo Kawazu; Michiyo Kogure; Shunji Sakai
- Cinematography: Kōhei Sugiyama
- Edited by: Shigeo Nishida
- Music by: Ichirō Saitō
- Distributed by: Daiei Film
- Release date: 15 December 1957 (Japan)
- Running time: 87 minutes
- Country: Japan
- Language: Japanese

Freelance Samurai (Japanese: 桃太郎侍, Hepburn: Momotarō Zamurai) is a 1957 color Japanese film directed by Kenji Misumi.

== Cast ==
- Ichikawa Raizō VIII as Momotarō aka Shinnosuke Wakagi
- Yoko Uraji as Yuri
- Seizaburo Kawazu as Hankuro Iga
- Michiyo Kogure as Kosuzu Hanabusa
- Shunji Sakai as Inosuke
