= Matashirō Fighting Journey =

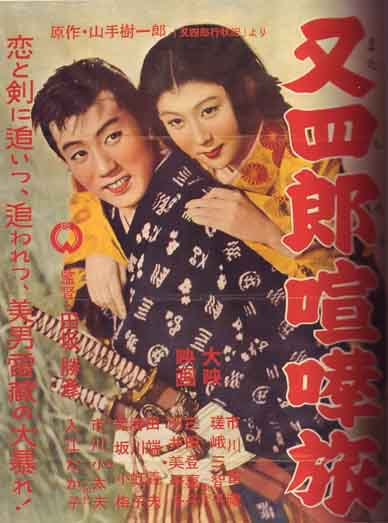
- Japanese movie poster
- Production company: Daiei Film
- Release date: January 9, 1956
- Running time: 85 minutes
- Country: Japan
- Language: Japanese

Matashirō Fighting Journey (又四郎喧嘩旅, Matashirō Kenka-tabi) is a 1956 Japanese film directed by Katsuhiko Tasaka

== Cast ==
- Ichikawa Raizō VIII
- Michiko Saga
- Tokiko Mita
- Michiko Ai
