= Tsukigata Hanpeita: Hana no maki; Arashi no maki =

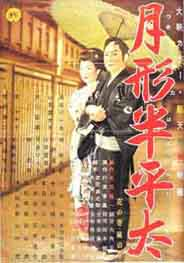
- Japanese movie poster
- Directed by: Teinosuke Kinugasa
- Written by: Minoru Inuzuka (writer); Teinosuke Kinugasa (writer)
- Production company: Daiei Film
- Release date: October 17, 1956 (Japan)
- Running time: 108 minutes
- Country: Japan
- Language: Japanese

Tsukigata Hanpeita: Hana no maki; Arashi no maki (Japanese: 月形半平太 花の巻 嵐の巻) is a 1956 Japanese film directed by Teinosuke Kinugasa.

== Cast ==
- Kazuo Hasegawa as Hanpeita Tsukigata
- Machiko Kyō as Hagino
- Teinosuke Kinugasa
- Hideo Takamatsu as Daijiro Akamatsu
- Raizo Ichikawa as Tatsuma Hayase
