= Ken (film) =

- Film poster
- Directed by: Kenji Misumi
- Written by: Kazuro Funabashi
- Based on: 剣 (Ken) by Yukio Mishima
- Produced by: Hiroaki Fujii
- Starring: Raizo Ichikawa; Yoshio Inaba; Yūsuke Kawazu
- Cinematography: Chishi Makiura
- Edited by: Kanji Suganuma
- Music by: Sei Ikeno
- Distributed by: Daiei Film
- Release date: March 14, 1964 (Japan)
- Running time: 94 minutes
- Country: Japan
- Language: Japanese

Ken (Japanese: 剣), also known as The Sword, is a 1964 Japanese film directed by Kenji Misumi. The film's screenplay was written by Kazuro Funabashi, based upon the short story of the same name by Yukio Mishima.

== Synopsis ==
The story is centered on Kokubu Jiro (Raizo Ichikawa), a prominent member of his university's Kendo dojo.

== Starring ==
- Raizo Ichikawa - Jiro Kokubun
- Akio Hasegawa - Mibu
- Chikako Miyagi - Kiuchi
- Yuka Konno - Sheko Fujishiro
- Junko Kozakura - Sanae Mibu
- Yoshio Inaba - Seiichiro Kokubun
- Rieko Sumi - Horoko Kokubun
- Yūsuke Kawazu - Kagawa
