= Sansho the Bailiff =

1954 period tragedy film

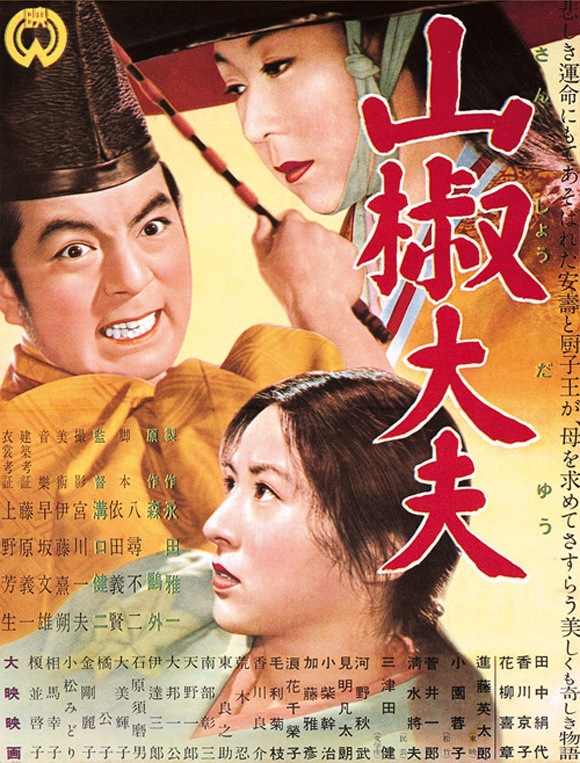
- Theatrical release poster
- Directed by: Kenji Mizoguchi
- Screenplay by: Fuji Yahiro; Yoshikata Yoda
- Based on: "Sansho the Bailiff" by Mori Ōgai
- Produced by: Masaichi Nagata
- Starring: Kinuyo Tanaka; Kyōko Kagawa; Yoshiaki Hanayagi; Eitarō Shindō
- Cinematography: Kazuo Miyagawa
- Edited by: Mitsuzō Miyata
- Music by: Fumio Hayasaka
- Distributed by: Daiei Film
- Release date: March 31, 1954
- Running time: 124 minutes
- Country: Japan
- Language: Japanese

Sansho The Bailiff (Japanese: 山椒大夫, Hepburn: Sanshō Dayū; known by its Japanese title in the United Kingdom and Ireland) is a 1954 Japanese period tragedy film directed by Kenji Mizoguchi based on a 1915 short story of the same name by Mori Ōgai (translated as "Sanshō the Steward" in English), which in turn was based on a sekkyō-bushi (oral lore) appearing in written form in the 17th century. It follows two aristocratic children who are sold into slavery.

Sansho The Bailiff bears many of Mizoguchi's hallmarks, such as portrayals of poverty and elaborately choreographed long takes. It is regarded as Mizoguchi’s magnum opus and one of the greatest films of all time.

== Plot ==
Sansho the Bailiff is a jidai-geki set in the latter part of the eleventh century, during the Heian period of feudal Japan.

In 1077, a virtuous governor is banished by a feudal lord to a far-off Tsukushi Province. His wife, Tamaki, and children, Zushiō and Anju, are sent to live with her brother. Just before they are separated, Zushiō's father tells him, "Without mercy, man is like a beast. Even if you are hard on yourself, be merciful to others." He urges his son to remember his words and gives him a statuette of Kannon, the Goddess of Mercy.

Years later, in 1083, the wife and children journey to his exiled land but are tricked on the journey by a treacherous priestess. The mother is sold into prostitution in Sado and the children are sold by slave traders to a manorial estate in Tango Province, where slaves are brutalized and branded when they try to escape. The estate, protected under the Minister of the Right, is administered by the eponymous Sanshō. Sanshō's son Tarō, the second-in-charge, is a much more humane master and convinces the children to survive before they can escape to find their mother.

The children grow to young adulthood at the slave camp. Anju still believes in the teachings of her father but Zushiō has repressed his humanity, becoming one of the brutal overseers, believing that this is the only way to survive. At work, Anju hears a song from a new slave girl from Sado which mentions her and her brother in the lyrics, leading her to believe their mother is still alive. She tries to convince Zushiō to escape but he refuses, citing the difficulty and their lack of money.

Zushiō is ordered to take Namiji, an older woman who is acutely ill, out of the slave camp to die in the wilderness. Anju accompanies them and while they break branches to provide covering for the dying woman, they recall a similar act from their earlier childhood. Zushiō changes his mind and asks Anju to escape with him to find their mother. Anju asks him to take Namiji with him, convincing her brother she will stay behind to distract the guards. Zushiō promises to return for Anju. However, after Zushiō's escape, Anju commits suicide by walking into a lake, drowning herself so that she will not be tortured and forced to reveal her brother's whereabouts.

After Zushiō escapes, he finds Tarō at an Imperial temple. Zushiō asks him to care for Namiji so that he can go to Kyoto to appeal to the Chief Advisor regarding the appalling slave conditions. Although initially refusing to see him, the Chief Advisor realizes who Zushiō is after seeing his statuette of Kannon. He then tells Zushiō that his exiled father died the year before and offers him the post of the governor of Tango, the province where Sanshō's manor is situated.

As Governor of Tango, Zushiō issues an edict forbidding slavery on both public and private grounds. No one believes he can do this since governors have no power over private grounds. Although Sanshō offers initial resistance, Zushiō orders him and his men arrested, freeing the slaves. When he looks for Anju among Sanshō's slaves, he learns that his sister sacrificed herself for his freedom. The manor is burned down by the ex-slaves while Sanshō and his family are exiled. Zushiō resigns immediately afterwards, stating that he has done what he intended to do.

Zushiō goes to Sado for his aged mother, whom he believes is still a courtesan. After hearing a man state that she died in a tsunami, he goes to the beach she is supposed to have died on. He finds a decrepit old woman sitting on the beach singing the same song he heard years before. Realizing she is his mother, he reveals his identity to her, but Tamaki, who has gone blind, assumes he is a trickster until he gives her the statuette of Kannon, which she recognizes by touch. Zushiō tells her that both Anju and their father have died and apologizes for not coming for her in the pomp of his governor's post. Instead he followed his father's proverb, choosing mercy toward others by freeing Sanshō's slaves. He tells his mother he has been true to his father's teachings, which she acknowledges poignantly.

== Cast ==
Actor	Role
Kinuyo Tanaka	Tamaki
Kyōko Kagawa	Anju
Eitarō Shindō	Sanshō
Yoshiaki Hanayagi	Zushiō
Ichirō Sugai	Minister of Justice Niō
Ken Mitsuda	Fujiwara no Morozane
Masahiko Tsugawa	Zushiō as a Boy
Masao Shimizu	Taira no Masauji
Chieko Naniwa	Ubatake
Kikue Mori	Priestess
Akitake Kōno	Tarō
Ryōsuke Kagawa	Donmyō Ritsushi

== Reception ==
On the review aggregator website Rotten Tomatoes, 100% of 19 critics' reviews are positive. On Metacritic, which uses a weighted average, the film has a score of 96 out of 100 based on 17 critics' reviews, indicating "universal acclaim."

Sansho won the Silver Lion for best direction in the 15th Venice International Film Festival, which once again brought Mizoguchi to the attention of Western critics and film-makers, after The Life of Oharu (International Award, 1952) and Ugetsu (Silver Lion, 1953).

In the British Film Institute's decentennial 2012 Sight & Sound polls, Sansho the Bailiff came in at 59th in the critics' poll, with 25 critics having voted for the film. In the 2022 edition of the poll, Sansho the Bailiff came in joint 75th place, tied with Spirited Away and Imitation of Life.

The New Yorker film critic Anthony Lane wrote in his September 2006 profile on Mizoguchi, "I have seen Sansho only once, a decade ago, emerging from the cinema a broken man but calm in my conviction that I had never seen anything better; I have not dared watch it again, reluctant to ruin the spell, but also because the human heart was not designed to weather such an ordeal." Roger Ebert gave the film four out of four stars and added it to his Great Movies list, writing, "Sometimes it is difficult to say exactly why a story strikes us with such power. In the case of Sansho the Baillif, it may be the unrelieved tragedy that strikes this good family for no good reason. They are not destroyed instantly, in a natural catacalysm, but separated for long years to know and experience their fates."

Writing for RogerEbert.com, Jim Emerson extolled the movie: "I don't believe there's ever been a greater motion picture in any language. This one sees life and memory as a creek flowing into a lake out into a river and to the sea."

Fred Camper, writing in The Little Black Book of Movies (edited by Chris Fujiwara), calls Sansho "one of the most devastatingly moving of films".

Martin Scorsese included Sansho on his list of "39 Essential Foreign Films for a Young Filmmaker."

Film critic Robin Wood, asked to make a Top 10 list for the website of The Criterion Collection, listed Sansho at number 1, calling it "[a] strong candidate for Greatest Film Ever Made. A perfect and profound masterpiece, rivaled only by its near companion Ugetsu.

Film critic Armond White listed Sansho as one of the greatest films ever made in the 2012 Sight & Sound poll. Reflecting on his experience, he wrote: "Movies don't change, but we do. I did not see Sansho the Bailiff until recently, and it had the same powerful effect on me as A.I. did ten years ago, so off with Spielberg to give Mizoguchi's masterwork its props."

Professor Richard Peña (Columbia University), in his entry for Sansho in 1001 Movies You Must See Before You Die, calls Sansho "one of the great emotional and philosophical journeys ever made for the cinema", and "[p]ossibly the high point in an unbroken string of masterpieces made by Kenji Mizoguchi shortly before his death".

== Stage production ==
In 1990, producers Robert Michael Geisler and John Roberdeau (Streamers, The Thin Red Line) commissioned director Terrence Malick to write a stage play based on Sansho the Bailiff. A private workshop of the play was undertaken in fall 1993 at the Brooklyn Academy of Music. It was directed by Andrzej Wajda with sets and costumes by Eiko Ishioka, lighting by Jennifer Tipton, sound by Hans Peter Kuhn, choreography by Suzushi Hanayagi, and a large cast, including Lui Chink. A smaller-scale workshop was mounted by Geisler-Roberdeau under Malick's own direction in Los Angeles in spring 1994. Plans to produce the play on Broadway were postponed indefinitely.

== Anime film ==
An animated film, Anju and Zushiomaru, was produced in 1961 by Toei, directed by Taiji Yabushita and Yuugo Serikawa. It featured supernatural anthropomorphic elements such as talking animals like Toei's other anime films of that time.

== Release ==
=== Home media ===
Sansho was unavailable on DVD in the English-speaking world until 2007, when it was released by The Criterion Collection in Region 1, while the Masters of Cinema released it in Region 2 under the title Sanshō Dayū in a double DVD twinpack with Gion Bayashi. Masters of Cinema re-released the single film in Blu-ray and DVD in a Dual Format combo in April 2012. Sansho was released by The Criterion Collection in Blu-ray in Region A on February 26, 2013.
