= Destiny's Son =

1962 film directed by Kenji Misumi

- Theatrical release poster
- Directed by: Kenji Misumi
- Screenplay by: Kaneto Shindō
- Based on: A novel by Renzaburō Shibata
- Produced by: Masaichi Nagata
- Starring: Raizo Ichikawa; Masayo Banri; Junichiro Narita; Shiho Fujimura; Shigeru Amachi
- Cinematography: Shōzō Honda
- Edited by: Kanji Suganuma
- Music by: Ichirō Saitō
- Production company: Daiei Film
- Release date: 1 July 1962 (Japan)
- Running time: 71 minutes
- Country: Japan
- Language: Japanese

Destiny's Son (Japanese: 斬る, Hepburn: Kiru) is a 1962 Japanese chambara film directed by Kenji Misumi starring Raizo Ichikawa, written by Kaneto Shindo, and released by Daiei Film. The film is based on one of the novels in the series of Nemuri Kyoshirō, written by Renzaburō Shibata.

== Plot ==
The film opens with Shiho Fujimura as a female assassin, seeking to kill her lord's mistress for what she sees as the good of her clan. She succeeds, but is punished for her act. She is sentenced to death, but it is her husband who executes her. Attempting to deal with the guilt of his action, he becomes a monk and sends their son Shingo to be fostered by another family. The rest of the film follows the young boy as he grows to become a skilled swordsman.

Not knowing much of his true past, Shingo sets out on a three-year journey at the age of 20 as a means of self-discovery. At the end of his journey, he returns home with an incredibly defined and near unbeatable sword style and develops an intimidating presence. He gains notoriety for his skills, but this spurs jealousy and betrayal and his foster family is wiped out by their neighbors. As his foster father dies in Shingo's arms, he passes on the information about his birth. Shingo then sets off to find his father, the monk who killed his mother. When they meet, his father shows him her grave and tells the story from his side, about his mother's execution and the father's life of dedicated solitude that has followed.

After leaving his father, Shingo finds employment using his sword skills as the bodyguard of a Shogunate official. Over three years of service, the two develop a father and son relationship. When a local daimyo cannot quell a rebellion in his fief, the official must travel there and admonish the daimyo. While in his palace, the official is tricked and assassinated. Realizing that he has failed, Shingo commits seppuku over his master's corpse.

== Cast ==
- Raizo Ichikawa as Takakura Shingo
- Masayo Banri
- Junichiro Narita
- Shiho Fujimura
- Shigeru Amachi
- Mayumi Nagisa
- Matasaburo Tanba
- Teru Tomota
- Eijirō Yanagi

== Film festivals ==
Destiny's Son has been part of a number of film festivals celebrating the chambara genre, and also the careers of Raizo Ichikawa and Kenji Misumi in the last decade.

== Legacy ==
The 2023 Netflix series Gamera Rebirth cited the Japanese title of Destiny's Son as an homage: Daiei Film's president Masaichi Nagata was one of creators of the titular kaiju Gamera. Additionally, Masaichi himself was the producer of Destiny's Son, and his adopted daughter Masako Ōta was Raizo Ichikawa's wife.
