= Ryosuke Kagawa =

Japanese actor (1896–1987)

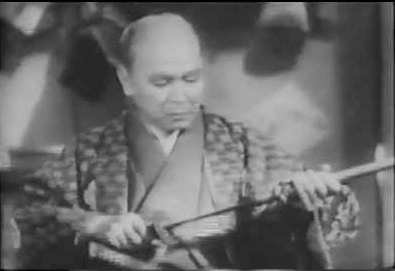
- Takada in the 1937 film Kettō Takadanobaba (Duel at Takadan-No-Baba)
- Born: 10 October 1896; Saga Prefecture, Japan
- Died: 17 April 1987 (aged 90)
- Occupation: Actor
- Years active: 1928–1986

Ryosuke Kagawa (香川良介, Kagawa Ryōsuke; 10 October 1896 – 17 April 1987) was a Japanese actor.

His son was child actor Sō Shuntarō. He appeared in more than 400 films between 1928 and 1986. His final film role was in the 1986 film Dixieland Daimyō directed by Kihachi Okamoto.

== Selected filmography ==
- Story of a Beloved Wife (1951)
- Dedication of the Great Buddha (1952)
- Gate of Hell (1953)
- Ugetsu (1953)
- Sansho the Bailiff (1954)
- The Second Son (1955)
- The Renyasai Yagyu Hidden Story (1956)
- Suzakumon (1957)
- Enjō (1958)
- The Loyal 47 Ronin (1958)
- Nichiren: A Man of Many Miracles (1958) as Hōjō Sanemasa
- Samurai Vendetta (1959)
- Scar Yosaburo (1960)
- The Story of Osaka Castle (1961) as Michiiku Itamiya
- Akō Rōshi (1961) as Matsumae Izunokami
- Hangyakuji (1961) as Ōkubo Tadayo
- Love Under the Crucifix (1962)
- 13 Assassins (1963) as Rōjū
- Bushido, Samurai Saga (1963) as Kōzuki Genza
- Kojiki Taishō (1964)
- Zatoichi's Flashing Sword (1964)
- Shinobi No Mono 6: Iga Mansion (1965) as Makino Hyōgo
- The Sword of Doom (1966) as Dansho Tsukue
- Japan's Longest Day (1967) as Tadaatsu Ishiguro
- Kill! (1968) as Mizoguchi
- Shinsengumi (1969)
- Samurai Banners (1969) as Nagasaka Yorihiro
- Bakumatsu (1970) as Tōkichi
- Battle of Okinawa (1971) as Old man
- Daichūshingura (1971, TV) as Hara Sōemon
- The Fall of Ako Castle (1978) as Uchikawa Magozaemon
- Nichiren (1979) as Hōjō Masamura
- Sanada Yukimura no Bōryaku (1979) as Tenkai
- Akō Rōshi (1979, TV) as Horibe Yahei
- The Fierce Battles of Edo (1979, TV) (ep.25) as Kuroda Gensai
- Tokugawa Ichizoku no Hokai (1980) as Takachika Mōri
- Onihei Hankachō (1980–82, TV) as Funagata no Sōhei
- The Funeral (1984) as President of the old people's association
- Dixieland Daimyō (1986)
