= The Young Swordsman =

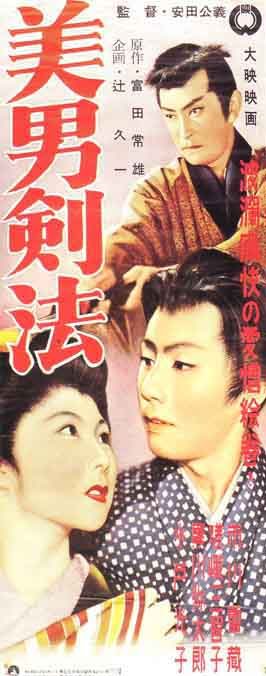
- Japanese movie poster
- Directed by: Kimiyoshi Yasuda
- Produced by: Daiei
- Release date: 22 December 1954 (Japan)
- Running time: 89 minutes
- Country: Japan
- Language: Japanese

The Young Swordsman (Japanese: 潮出来島 美男剣法, Hepburn: Shiode Kushima Binan Kenpō) is a 1954 black-and-white Japanese film directed by Kimiyoshi Yasuda.

== Cast ==
- Ichikawa Raizō IV
- Michiko Saga
- Mitsuko Mito
