= Fuji Yahiro =

Japanese screenwriter

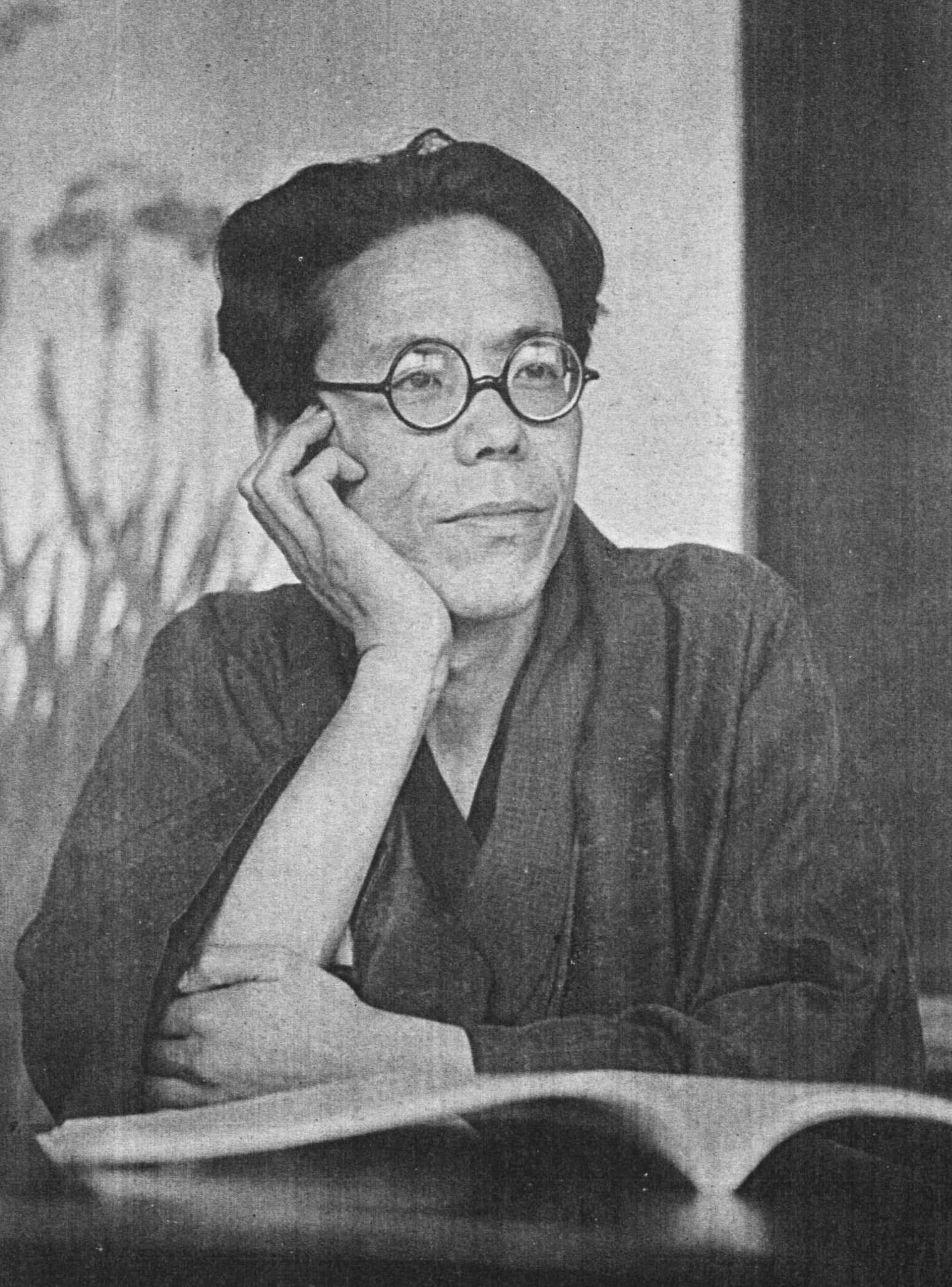
- Fuji Yahiro in 1941
- Born: July 18, 1904; Fukuoka Prefecture
- Died: November 9, 1986 (aged 82)
- Occupation: Screenwriter

Fuji Yahiro (八尋不二, Yahiro Fuji) (18 July 1904 – 9 November 1986) was a Japanese screenwriter, mostly of chanbara films. His real name was Minoru Yahiro. Leaving Meiji University before graduating, he began writing screenplays at Shōzō Makino's Makino Film Productions in 1927. He ended up penning hundreds of screenplays at many studios, such as Teikine, Shinkō Kinema, and Daiei. He also participated in the "Narutakimura" group, writing screenplays with Sadao Yamanaka, Hiroshi Inagaki, Eisuke Takizawa and others. He also wrote many books and received the Order of the Rising Sun in 1975.

== Selected filmography ==
- Sansho the Bailiff (山椒大夫, Sanshō Dayū) (1954)
- The Great White Tiger Platoon (花の白虎隊, Hana no Byakkotai) (1954)
- Bloody Spear at Mount Fuji (血槍富士, Chiyari Fuji) (1955)
- Ghost-Cat of Gojusan-Tsugi (怪猫五十三次, Kaibyo Gojusan-tsugi) (1956)
- Yatarō gasa (弥太郎笠) (1957)
- Freelance Samurai (桃太郎侍, Momotarō Zamurai) (1957)
- Onibi Kago (鬼火駕籠) (1957)
- Suzakumon (朱雀門) (1957)
- The Loyal 47 Ronin (忠臣蔵, Chushingura) (1958)
- The Ghost of Yotsuya (四谷怪談, Yotsuya kaidan) (1959)
- The Demon of Mount Oe (大江山酒天童子, Ōeyama Shuten Dōji) (1960)
- The Great Wall (秦・始皇帝, Shin Shikōtei) (1962)
- The Snow Woman (怪談雪女郎, Kaidan Yukijorō) (1968)
