= Kazuo Hasegawa =

Japanese actor (1908–1984)

- 長谷川 一夫
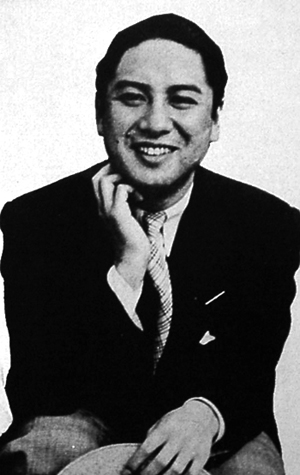
- Kazuo Hasegawa in 1937
- Born: 27 February 1908; Fushimi, Kyoto, Japan
- Died: 6 April 1984 (aged 76); Tokyo, Japan
- Other names: Chōjirō Hayashi, Nagamaru Hayashi
- Occupation: Actor
- Years active: 1913–1982

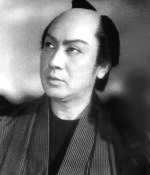
Kazuo Hasegawa as Zenigata Heiji in the film Zenigata Heiji (1951).

Kazuo Hasegawa (長谷川 一夫, Hasegawa Kazuo; 27 February 1908 – 6 April 1984), formerly known by his stage names Chōjirō Hayashi (林 長二郎, Hayashi Chōjirō) and Nagamaru Hayashi (林 長丸, Hayashi Nagamaru), was a Japanese film and stage actor. He appeared in over 300 films from 1927 to 1963.

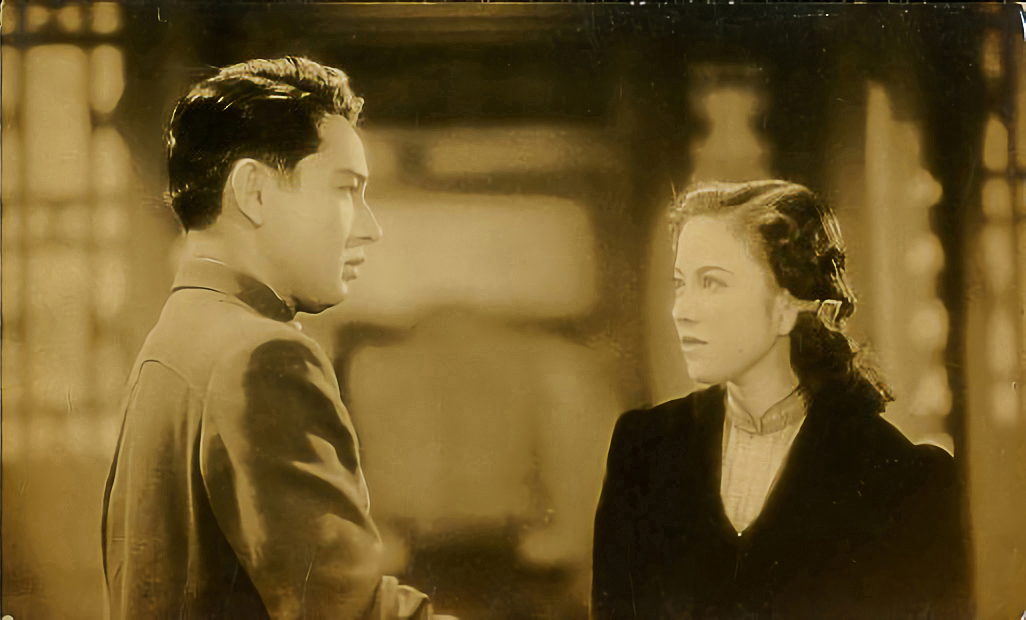
Li Hsiang-lan & Kazuo Hasegawa

== Career ==
Born to a sake brewing family in Kyoto, he first appeared on stage at age five in a theater run by his family as a side business. In 1918, he became a student of Nakamura Ganjirō I and performed kabuki in the Kansai region. He joined the Shochiku studio in 1927 and made his film debut in Chigo no kenpō under the name Chōjirō Hayashi. His good looks and graceful fighting style made him a major jidaigeki star, and he appeared in more than 120 films for Shochiku in 11 years, with the best works being directed by Teinosuke Kinugasa. The 1935 Yukinojō henge was a significant hit. He moved to the Toho studio in 1937. On 11 November 1937, however, he was attacked by ruffians and his face slashed with razor blades. According to the historian Daisuke Miyao, "Even though there was no clear evidence, it was widely assumed that this violent incident was Shochiku's retaliatory measure against Hayashi's so-called betrayal." He recovered and changed his stage name to his real name, Kazuo Hasegawa. Hasegawa appeared in many successful films for Toho, including several "national-policy pictures with Chinese settings", such as Song of the White Orchid (1939) and China Night (1940), with co-star Ri Koran. He moved to Daiei Film in 1950 and continued appearing in the popular Zenigata Heiji series. He also appeared in many classic films including Kozaburo Yoshimura's The Tale of Genji (1951), Kinugasa's Gate of Hell (1953), and Kenji Mizoguchi's The Crucified Lovers (1954). He was appointed to Daiei's board of directors in 1957. To celebrate his 300th film, Hasegawa appeared in a new version of Yukinojō henge (known abroad as An Actor's Revenge) in 1963 directed by Kon Ichikawa. He left Daiei that year and continued to appear on stage and television, including starring in the second NHK Taiga drama Akō Rōshi in 1964. He also directed the Takarazuka Revue version of The Rose of Versailles in 1974.

== Selected filmography ==
Filmography of Kazuo Hasegawa include (incomplete):

- Chîgo no kênhô (1927) - Suda Ichijiro
- Ojo Kichiza (1927)
- Rangûn (1927)
- Oni azami (1927)
- Kinnoi jidai (1927)
- Itâwari no âsatarô (1927)
- Yâburê amikasâ (1927)
- Myôtoboshi (1927)
- Goyosen (1927)
- Akatsuki no yushi (1927)
- Kôrui (1927)
- Kômori zoshî (1927)
- Gekka no kyôto (1927)
- Tenpô hikenrôku (1927)
- Meoto boshi (1927)
- Benten kozo (1928) - Benten Kozo Kikunosuke
- Kyôrakû hîcho (1928)
- Kaikokuki (1928) - Shirigoro
- Fûun jôshi (1928) - Aizawa Shinpachi
- Chokun yasha (1928)
- Kagaribi (1928)
- Shirai gonachi (1928)
- Ôse no hangoro (1928)
- Kaitô Samimaro (1928)
- Kên no chikemuri (1928)
- Ninpinîn (1928)
- Edo sodachi (1928)
- Shîgurêgasâ (1928)
- Kirare yosa (1928)
- Ningyô bushi (1928)
- Jujiro (十字路) (also known as Crossroads, Crossways, Shadows of the Yoshiwara or Slums of Tokyo) (1928)
- Tôribêyama shinjû (1928) - Kikuchi Hankuro
- Kurotegumi Sukeroku (1929)
- Jigoku kaidô (1929)
- Ôbo kîchiza (1929)
- Fubuki tôge (1929)
- Omokage (1929)
- Yari no gonza (1929)
- Tsukigata hanpeita (1929)
- Ise ondo (1929)
- Sanzâ shigure (1929)
- Chi ni somuku mono (1929)
- Kurueru meikun (1929) - 'Sakyônosuke' Hidenao
- Nogitsune Sanji (1930) - Nogitsune Sanji
- Naozamurai (1930)
- Fuyuki shinju (1930)
- Matsudaira Chôshichirô (1930)
- Seki no yatappe (1930)
- Nâniwa kâgamî (1930)
- Katawa bina (1930)
- Hakaranno uta (go) (1930)
- Sâtsunan sôdoîn (1930)
- Fubuki ni sakebu ôkami (1931)
- Bîjobu sakyô zenpen (1931)
- Monsâburô no hide (1931)
- Reimei izen (1931)
- Îzayoi seishin (1931)
- Batô no zeni (1931, part 1, 2)
- Kagoya dainagôn (1931)
- Jonan no yôemon (1931)
- Nagebushi Yanosuke (1931, part 1, 2)
- Hîren kaênzukâ (1931)
- Chîyoda no ninjo (1931)
- Yajikitâ bijin sodoki (1932)
- Konjiki Yasha (1932) - Hazama Kanichi
- Tâbiwarajî kokyo no utâ (1932)
- Nezumikozô Jirokichi (1932, part 1, 2)
- Mâtsuriûta miyokîchi goroshî (1932)
- Rikugun daikôshin (1932)
- Edo gonomi Ryôgoku sôshi (1932)
- Kamiyui shinzô (1932)
- Hototogisu (1932)
- Kikugorô goshi zenpen (1932)
- Chûshingura (1932, part 1-3) - Asano Takuminokami / Yoshida Sawaemon
- Kikugorô koshi kohen (1932)
- Kyokyaku harusamegasa (1933) - Oguchiya Gyou
- Hôrimonô hagan (1933, part 1-3) - Toyama, Kinshiro and farmer Hyakunosuke
- Koina no Ginpei (1933) - Koina no Ginpei
- Ishii tsuneemon (1934)
- Yâshu honnoji (1934)
- Meireki meikenshi (1934)
- Yâkko kagamiyama (1934)
- Rînzo shusse tâbi (1934)
- Gênzaburô ihen no maki (1934, part 1, 2)
- Watashi no niisan (1934) - Fumio
- Kyôkaku Soga (1934)
- Haha no ai (1935)
- Rônintabi sasshô bosatsu (1935)
- Kagoya hangan (1935) - Echizen'nokami Ôoka
- Yukinojô henge (1935-1936, part 1, 2) - Yokinojo, Yamitaro and Yokinojo's mother
- Tenpô Yasubei (1935)
- Megumi no kenka (1935)
- Kurayami no Ushimatsu (1935)
- Hanamuko no negoto (1935) - Yasuo the Bridegroom
- Odoru meikun (1935)
- Tôribêyama shinjû: Osome Hankurô (1936) - Hankruô
- Onâtsu sejurô (1936) - Seijuro
- Harûsugatâ gonin otoko (1936)
- Arâkawa no Sakichi (1936)
- Suzugamori (1937)
- Môko shûrai: Tekikoku kôfuku; Shishi-hen (1937) - Tokimune Hôjô
- Tsûchiyâ Chikara: Râkka no make (1937) - Tsuchiya Chikara / Sugino Jubeita
- Tabi no kagerô (1937)
- Sêkkai no maki (1937)
- Ôsaka natsu no jin (1937) - Sakazaki Izumo no kami
- Bancho sarayashiki (1937)
- Tôjûrô no koi (1938) - Sakata Tojuro
- Mabuta no haha (1938) - Kondo
- Tsuruhachi and Tsurujiro (1938) - Tsurujirō
- Gekka no wakamusha (1938)
- Rônin fubuki (1939) - Kazuemon Fuwa / Asano Takuminokami
- Ninjutsu hyakuju gassen (1939, part 1, 2)
- Têkketsû ippon gatanâ (1939)
- Hagakure tengu (1939)
- Chushingura (1939, part 1, 2) - Asano Takuminokami
- Kenka tobi (1939, part 1, 2) - Kichigorô
- Kappa dai-kassen (1939) - Kyôma Yûki
- Byakuran no uta: zenpen: kôhen (1939) - Kokichi Matsumura
- Josô ninjutsu igaryû (1939)
- Gozonji azuma otoko (1939)
- Echigo jishi matsuri (1939)
- Kenpû hyakumangoku (1940)
- Gôketsu sanbagarasu (1940)
- Tôryû musha ningyô (1940)
- Hebihimesama (1940) - Sentarô
- Goto matabei (1940)
- Moyuru ôzora (1940)
- Shina no yoru (1940, part 1-4) - Tetsuo Hase
- Zoku Hebihimesama (1940) - Hinokiya Sentarô
- Aozora kaidô (1940)
- Orizuru dainagon (1940)
- Akatsuki no shinshu (1940)
- Kinnô onshû tôge (1940)
- Reimei no ezochi (1940)
- Nessa no chikai (Zenpen; Kôhen) (1940) - Kenji Sugiyama
- Moyuru daichi (1940) - Lt. Ohashi
- Adaûchi goyomi (1940)
- Kinô kieta otoko (1941) - Bunkichi
- Hasegawa Roppa no Iemitsu to Hikoza (1941) - Iemitsu Tokugawa / Yukie Kawamura
- Orizo nan henge (go) (1941)
- Kawanakajima kassen (1941) - Hyakuzô
- Otoko no hanamichi (1941) - Utaemon Nakamura III
- Awa no odoriko (1941) - Man Who Returns
- Matte ita otoko (1942)
- Onna keizu (1942, part 1, 2) - Hayase
- Omokage no machi (1942)
- Ina no Kantarô (1943) - Ina no Kantarô
- Ongaku dai-shingun (1943)
- Meijin Chôji-bori (1943) - Chôji
- Susume dokuritsuki (1943) - Kinugasa / Imai
- Himetaru kakugo (1943) - Fumio Abe
- Idaten kaido (1944) - Hagiwara
- Shibaidô (1944)
- Inochi no minato (1944)
- Ato ni tsuzuku o shinzu (1944) - Company Commander Wakabayashi
- Sanjûsangen-dô, tôshiya monogatari (1945) - Kanbei Kanzamon
- Aru yo no Tonosama (1946)
- Tôhô sen'ichi-ya (1947)
- Kyô wa odote (1947) - Watanabe
- Ôedo no oni (1947)
- Bonbon (1947) - Yatarô
- Yûrei akatsuki ni shisu (1948) - Heitarô Obata / Koheita
- Kobanzame zenpen (1948)
- Hasegawa Kazuo no Zenigata Heiji Torimonohikae: Heiji Happyakuyacho (1949) - Zenigata Heiji
- Kobanzame (1949)
- Koga yashiki (1949) - Genzaburo
- Hebi hime dochu (1949)
- Zoku hebi hime dochu (1950)
- Jogashima no ame (1950)
- Hi no tori (1950)
- Ashura hangan (1950)
- Tsuki no wataridori (1951) - Ginpei
- Meigetsu somato (1951)
- The Tale of Genji (1951) - Hikaru Genji
- Genji monogatari (1951) - Hikaru Genji
- Dedication of the Great Buddha (1952) - Kunihito Tateto
- Shurajô hibun (1952, part 1, 2) - Momotarô / Shin'nosuke
- Fuun senryobune (1952)
- Kantarou tsukiyo-uta (1952) - Kantarou
- Jirokichi kôshi (1952)
- Furisode kyôjo (1952) - Yaemon at Shinade
- Asama no karasu (1953) - Giro Kutsukake
- Kinsei mei shôbu monogatari: Hana no Kôdôkan (1953) - Hideyuki Mishima
- Shishi no za (1953) - Yagorô Hôshô
- Gate of Hell (1953) - Moritoo Endô
- Omatsuri hanjirô (1953) - Hanjiro Kotani
- Zenigata Heiji: Ghost Lord (銭形平次捕物控 幽霊大名 Zenigata Heiji Torimono-Hikae: Yūrei Daimyō) (1954)
- The Crucified Lovers (1954) - Mohei
- Yoidore ni tôryû (1954) - Nakayama Yasubee
- Hana no nagadosu (1954) - Monjirô
- Banchô sara yashiki: Okiku to Harima (1954)
- Itarô jishi (1955)
- Nanatsu no kao no ginji (1955)
- A Girl Isn't Allowed to Love (1955) - Gofû Yamamura
- Tōjūrō no Koi (藤十郎の恋) (1955) - Tojuro Sakata
- Ore wa Tokichiro (1955)
- Ishigassen (1955)
- Hana no Wataridori (1956)
- Shin, Heike monogatari: Yoshinaka o meguru sannin no onna (1956) - Jirô-Yoshinaka Kiso
- Zangiku monogatari (残菊物語) (1956) - Kikunosuke
- Zenigata Heiji Torimono no Hikae (1956, part 1, 2)
- Tsukigata Hanpeita: Hana no maki; Arashi no maki (1956) - Hanpeita Tsukigata
- A Fantastic Tale of Naruto (1957) - Gennojo Norizuki
- Zenigata Heiji torimono hikae: madara hebi (1957)
- Yuki no wataridori (1957)
- Ukifune (1957) - Kaoru-no-kimi
- Yûkyô Gonin Otoko (1958)
- Edokko matsuri (1958) - Tasuke Isshin
- The Loyal 47 Ronin (忠臣蔵 Chūshingura) (1958) - Kuranosuke Ôishi
- Hana no yukyo-den (1958)
- Nichiren to mōko daishūrai (1958) - Nichiren
- Iga no suigetsu (1958)
- Kagerô-gasa (1959) - Yatarô
- Onna to kaizoku (1959) - Shogor Ozaki
- Yamada Nagamasa - Oja no ken (1959) - Nagamasa Yamada
- Jirôchô Fuji (1959) - Shimizu no Jirôchô
- The Ghost of Yotsuya (1959) - Iemon Tamiya
- Utamaro wo meguru gonin no onna (1959)
- Seki no yatappe (1959)
- Zenigata Heiji torimono hikae (1960-1961, part 1, 2)
- The Demon of Mount Oe (1960) - Shuten-dōji
- San'nin no kaoyaku (1960) - Ryûtarô Tsumura
- Kizu senryô (1960) - Chouemon Takakura
- Ippon-gatana dohyô iri (1960)
- Zoku Jirocho Fuji (1960) - Shimizu no Jirôchô
- San kyôdai no kettô (1960) - Inoue
- Futari no musashi (1960) - Hirata Musashi
- Furaî monogatari-âbara hishâ (1960)
- Harekosode (1961)
- Sakurada mon (1961)
- Mito komon umi o wataru (1961)
- Kuroi sandogasa (1961)
- Sabakareru Echizen no kami (1962) - Ichijûrô Ôoka
- Aobajô no oni (1962) - Kai Harada
- Shin no shikôtei (1962)
- An Actor's Revenge (1963) - Yukinojo Nakamura / Yamitaro the Thief
- Edo mujô (1963) - Awajinokami Wakisaka
- Ako Roshi (1964, Taiga drama, TV Series)

== Honours ==
- Kikuchi Kan Prize (1957)
- Medal with Purple Ribbon (1965)
- Order of the Sacred Treasure, 3rd class, Gold Rays with Neck Ribbon (1978)
- People's Honour Award (1984)
