= Jun Negami =

Japanese actor (1923–2005)

- 根上 淳
- Born: Fujio Mori; September 20, 1923; Nakano-ku, Tokyo, Japan
- Died: October 24, 2005 (aged 82); Shinjuku, Tokyo, Japan
- Education: Hosei University
- Occupation: Actor
- Years active: 1949–1998
- Spouse: Peggy Hayama
- Relatives: Rudolf Dittrich (grandfather)

Jun Negami (根上 淳, Negami Jun; born Fujio Mori; September 20, 1923 - October 24, 2005) was a Japanese actor. He was best known internationally for his role as Ryū Ibuki on the tokusatsu television series Return of Ultraman (1971–72).

== Filmography ==
=== Film ===
- Pen itsuwarazu, bôryoku no machi (1950)
- Shojoho (1950)
- Kumo no machi (1950)
- Mesu inu (1951) - Keiichi Shirakawa
- Honoo no hada (1951)
- Asakusa kurenaidan (1952) - Shimakichi
- Nagasaki No Uta Wa Wasureji (1952) - Nogami, Hiroyuki
- Shino machi o nogarete (1952) - Shiro Nomura
- Mōjū tsukai no shōjo (1952)
- Lightning (1952) - Shuzo
- Zoku Jûdai no seiten (1953) - Masato Miki
- Zoku zoku Jûdai no seiten (1953) - Shingo Arai
- Jūdai no yūwaku (1953)
- Konjiki yasha (1954) - Kan-ichi
- Asakusa no yoru (1954) - Tozuki
- Midori no nakama (1954) - Ippei Takazu
- Tsuki yori no shisha (1954)
- Kawa no aru shitamachi no hanashi (1955) - Gizô Kurita
- Hotaru no hikari (1955)
- Nanatsu no kao no ginji (1955)
- A Girl Isn't Allowed to Love (1955) - Shin'ichirō Matsushima
- Asakusa no oni (1955)
- Shichinin no ani imôto (1955) - Natsu / Keiichi
- Hanayome no tameiki (1956) - Keita Funayama
- Asakusa no hi (1956)
- Ninjô baka (1956)
- Gogo 8 ji 13 pun (1956) - Jôji Harada
- Teahouse of the August Moon (1956) - Mr. Seiko
- Tsuki no kôdôkan (1956)
- Hibana (1956)
- Wasureji no gogo 8 ji 13 pun (1957) - Jôji Harada
- Danryu (1957) - Yuzo Hiashi
- Daitokai no gozen 3-ji (1958)
- The Loyal 47 Ronin (1958) - Sagaminokami Tsuchiya
- Tabi wa Kimagure Kaze Makase (1958)
- Haha (1958) - Ryôtarô Yuasa
- Akasen no hi wa kiezu (1958) - Inutaro
- Yoru no sugao (1958) - Wakabayashi
- Kyohansha (1958)
- Sasameyuki (1959) - Itakura
- Haha no omokage (1959) - Sadao Sagawa
- Yamada Nagamasa - Oja no ken (1959) - Gorobei Onishi
- Jirôchô Fuji (1959)
- Jan Arima no shûgeki (1959)
- Kaigunheigakkô monogatari: Aa! Etajima (1959)
- Machibugyô nikki: Tekka botan (1959) - Gônosuke Hori
- A Woman's Testament (1960) - Kanemitsu
- The Demon of Mount Oe (1960)
- Kenju no okite (1960)
- Afraid to Die (1960) - Yusaku Sagara
- Satan's Sword (1960) - Serizawa
- Zoku Jirocho Fuji (1960)
- Kizû tsu ita yajû (1960)
- Furaî monogatari-âbara hishâ (1960)
- Harekosode (1961)
- Tôshi reijô (1961) - Professor
- Ginza no bonbon (1961) - Ozaki
- A Wife Confesses (1961) - Lawyer Sugiyama
- Buda (1961) - Mahakashyapa
- Katei no jijô (1962) - Ochiai
- Yûkai (1962) - Takaoka
- Nessa no tsuki (1962)
- Yatchaba no Onna (1962)
- Makkanâ koi no monogatari (1963)
- Hanzaî sakusen nanbâ wan (1963)
- Odoritai yoru (1963) - Takashi Dan
- Kyojin Ôkuma Shigenobu (1963) - Hiroshi Nakai
- Kuro no kyôki (1964)
- Mushuku mono jingi (1965)
- A, zerosen (1965) - Takada
- The Guardman: Tokyo yôjimbô (1965) - Ôishi
- Rokyoku komori-uta (1965)
- Ninkyo otoko ippiki (1965)
- The Dragon's Fangs (1966)
- Satogashi ga kowareru toki (1967) - Azuma
- Mesu ga osu o kuikorosu: Sanbiki no kamakiri (1967) - Shiro Oba
- Rikugun chôhô 33 (1968) - Minoru Sasaki
- Onna no iji (1971)
- Ai to makoto: Kanketsu-hen (1976)
- Hadaka no taisho horo-ki: Yamashita Kiyoshi monogatari (1981)
- Yojôhan iro no nureginu (1983)
- Irodori-gawa (1984) - Soichiro Saso
- Mishima: A Life in Four Chapters (1985) - Kurahara (segment "Runaway Horses")
- Shaso (1989) - Tadayuki Matsuzaki

=== Television ===
- Shiroi Kyotō (1967) - Shuji Satomi
- Ten to Chi to (1969) - Imagawa Yoshimoto
- The Return of Ultraman (1971–1972) - Captain Ryu Ibuki
- Hachidai Shōgun Yoshimune (1995) - Tokugawa Mitsutomo
