= Kyū Sazanka =

Japanese actor (1914–1971)

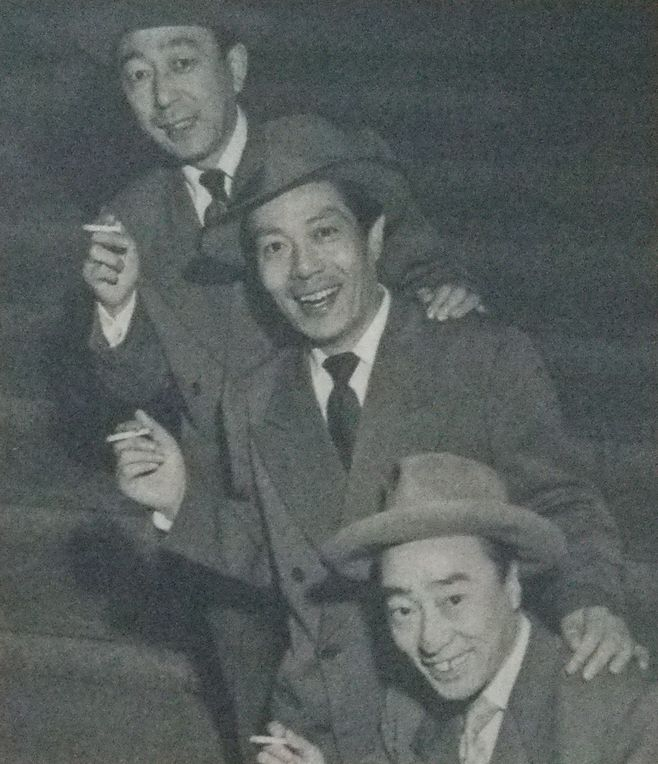
- Sazanka (center) as one of the Akireta Boys
- Born: Mineo Suehiro; April 1, 1914; Chūō-ku, Osaka, Osaka, Japan
- Died: March 4, 1971 (aged 56)
- Occupation: Actor
- Years active: 1932–1970

Kyū Sazanka (山茶花 究, Sazanka Kyū; April 1, 1914 – March 4, 1971) was a Japanese actor.

== Career ==
Sazanka debuted as a singer in Asakusa in 1932 and was active on the vaudeville circuit as a member of the Akireta Bōizu (Boys). He made his film debut in 1946.

== Selected filmography ==
=== Film ===
Year	Title	Role	Director
1955	Meoto zenzai	Kyōichi	Shirō Toyoda
1955	Takekurabe	Tatsugorō	Heinosuke Gosho
1956	Mahiru no ankoku	Shiraki	Tadashi Imai
1956	Koi Sugata Kitsune Goten	Fujimaru	Nobuo Nakagawa
1957	An Osaka Story		Kōzaburō Yoshimura
1957	Oshidori kenkagasa		Ryō Hagiwara
1958	Giants and Toys	Ryûzô Higashi	Yasuzo Masumura
1958	Yūrakuchō de Aimashō	Saburō Maeda	Koji Shima
1959	The Human Condition	Chang	Masaki Kobayashi
1959	Odd Obsession	Curio dealer	Kon Ichikawa
1960	When a Woman Ascends the Stairs	Bar owner	Mikio Naruse
1960	Cruel Story of Youth		Nagisa Oshima
1960	The Bad Sleep Well	Kaneko	Akira Kurosawa
1961	Yojimbo	Ushitora	Akira Kurosawa
1961	Akumyō	Yoshioka	Tokuzō Tanaka
1961	Zoku Akumyō	Yoshioka	Tokuzō Tanaka
1961	The End of Summer	Yamaguchi	Yasujirō Ozu
1962	Chūshingura: Hana no Maki, Yuki no Maki	Yanagisawa Yoshiyasu	Hiroshi Inagaki
1963	High and Low	Creditor	Akira Kurosawa
1964	Pale Flower	Boss Imai	Masahiro Shinoda
1965	The Hoodlum Soldier		Yasuzo Masumura

=== Television ===
Year	Title	Role	Network	Notes
1965	Taikōki	Hachisuka Masakatsu	NHK	Taiga drama
