= Sachiko Murase =

Japanese actress (1905–1993)

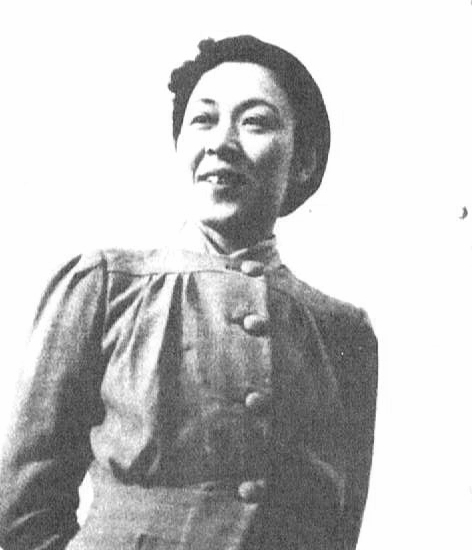
- Born: Sada Matsui; 21 March 1905; Honjo Ward, Tokyo, Japan
- Died: 9 October 1993 (aged 88); Maebashi, Gunma, Japan
- Occupation: Actress
- Years active: 1927–1991
- Spouse: Kihachi Kitamura

Sachiko Murase (村瀬 幸子, Murase Sachiko; 21 March 1905 – 9 October 1993) was a Japanese stage and film actress. She appeared in about 90 films between 1927 and 1991, often under the direction of Hiroshi Shimizu and Keisuke Kinoshita, and received numerous awards for her stage and film performances.

== Biography ==
Sachiko Murase was born Sada Matsui in Honjo Ward, Tokyo. A graduate from Tokyo Prefectural Second Girls' High School, she joined the Tsukiji Shogekijo theatre in 1925. At the age of nineteen she became a stage actress, associated with Japan's leftist avant-garde. Murase gave her film debut in 1927 and entered the Shochiku film studio four years later. Together with her husband Kihachi Kitamura, she formed the Geijutsu Shogekijo theatre in 1937. In 1944, the year following the dissolution of Geijutsu Shogekijo, she was one of the founding members of the Haiyuza Theatre Company together with Koreya Senda, Eijirō Tōno, Chieko Higashiyama, Eitarō Ozawa and others. Since the mid-1950s, she also regularly appeared on television. She was the oldest active actress of Shingeki (Japanese modern realist) theatre in her lifetime.

== Selected filmography ==
- Sentanteki dawane (1930)
- Gendai okusama katagi (1930)
- Seishun zue (1931)
- Nanatsu no umi: Zenpen – Shōjo-hen (1931) – Ayako Kirihara
- Jōnetsu – Ra pashion (1932) – Mitsuko, reporter
- Satsueijo romansu, renai annai (1932)
- Nanatsu no umi: Kōhen – Teisō-hen (1932) – Ayako Kirihara
- Nemure haha no mune ni (1933)
- Zen'ei sōkō ressha (1933)
- A Woman Crying in Spring (1933) – Oaki
- Juku no haru (1933)
- Rappa to musume (1933)
- Sono yo no onna (1934)
- The Boss’s Son at College (1934) – Fumiko
- Shunkinsho: Okoto to Sasuke (1935) – Yoshiko
- Yakushin Tokyo minato matsuri (1935)
- Sakura no sono (1936) – Namie – stepdaughter
- Niji tatsu oka (1938) – Mrs. Hayakawa
- Sincerity (1939) – Mrs. Asada
- Onna keizu (1942) – Sakai's wife
- Zoku onna keizu (1942) – Sakai's Wife
- Yaotome no uta (1942)
- Port of Flowers (1943) – O-yuki
- Marriage – Fujie Sugawara
- Spring Awakens (1947) – Masa Hirobe
- Apostasy (1948) – Inoko's wife
- Here's to the Young Lady (1949) – Proprietress of the bar
- Mahiru no embukyoku (1949) – Yasuko
- A Broken Drum (1949) – Kuniko
- The Angry Street (1950) – Sudō's mother
- Re mizeraburu: Kami to akuma (1950)
- Re mizeraburu: Kami to jiyu no hata (1950)
- Wakai musumetachi (1951) – Mihiko
- Junpaku no yoru (1951)
- Kaze ni soyogu asi (Kouhen) (1951) – Sakiko Kodama
- Kekkon annai (1952)
- Carmen's Pure Love (1952)
- Himitsu (1952) – Doctor
- Natsuko no boken (1953) – Itsuko, Natsuko's aunt
- Himawari musume (1953) – Setsuko's mother
- Yoru no owari (1953) – Madame
- Aijō ni tsuite (1953) – Masako
- Zoku shishunki (1953)
- Itsuko to sono haha (1954) – Shizuko Matsuo
- Onna no issho (1955) – Aoshima's mother
- A Girl Isn't Allowed to Love (1955) – Junko Matsushima
- Princess Yang Kwei-Fei (1955) – Chengfei (uncredited)
- Sugata naki mokugekisha (1955) – Motoko
- Asunaro monogatari (1955) – Landlady
- Kaki no ki no aru ie (1955) – Sei Komatsu
- Shichinin no ani imōto (1955) – Satoko Kitahara
- Hahabue kobue (1955)
- Ryūri no Kishi (1956) – Uta, Chiho's grand mother
- Gendai no yokubō (1956) – Mineko Iizuka
- Aru onna no baai (1956) – Teruko Hisamoto
- Yūhi to kenjū (1956) – Atsuko
- Aishu no machi ni kiri ga furu (1956)
- Banjun Morishige no funnyotan (1957)
- Bōkyaku no hanabira: Kanketsuhen (1957)
- Kisses (1957) – Kikyoko Shirakawa
- Kajin (1958) – Takako Sakō
- Towa ni kotaezu – Kanketsu-hen (1958) – Toshiko
- Denwa wa yugata ni naru (1959)
- Mi wa jukushitari (1959) – Naoko, Shinobu's mother
- Kizoku no kaidan (1959)
- Meiji Tennō to Nogi Shōgun (1959) – Shizuko, Nogi's wife
- A False Student (1960) – Hikoichi's mother
- Arega minato no hi da (1961)
- Nippon no obaachan (1962) – Tsuya
- Wakamono ni yume ari (1962)
- Asu no hanayome (1962) – Hatsu Shiozaki
- Wakai hito (1962) – Atsuko Yamagata
- Zatoichi the Fugitive (1963) – Maki
- Oka wa hanazakari (1963) – Setsu Noro
- Kizudarake no sanga (1964) – Fujiko Arima
- Hadaka no jūyaku (1964) – Matsuyo Hidaka
- Zatoichi and the Doomed Man (1965) – Shimazo's wife
- The School of Spies (1966) – Kikuno Miyoshi
- The Kii River (1966) – Yasu
- Ichiman sanzennin (1966)
- Lost Spring (1967) – Taza Murakoshi
- Love for an Idiot (1967) – Sumie
- The Snow Woman (1968) – Soyo
- Aa, kaigun (1970)
- Tsubasa wa kokoro ni tsukete (1978)
- Jishin rettō (1980) – Fusae Kawazu (Yūko's mother)
- Station (1981) – Ryosuke's mother
- Jidai-ya no nyobo (1983)
- A Promise (1986) – Tatsu, Ryōsaku's wife
- Rhapsody in August (1991) – Kane

== Awards and honours (selected) ==
- 1965: Ministry of Education's Outstanding Performance prize
- 1986: Mainichi Film Award for Best Supporting Actress for A Promise
- 1989: Kinokuniya Theatre Award for Arifuku shijin
- 1990: Order of the Sacred Treasure, 4th Class
- 1991: Nikkan Sports Film Award for Best Actress for Rhapsody in August
