= Hiroshi Kawaguchi (actor) =

Japanese actor (1936–1987)

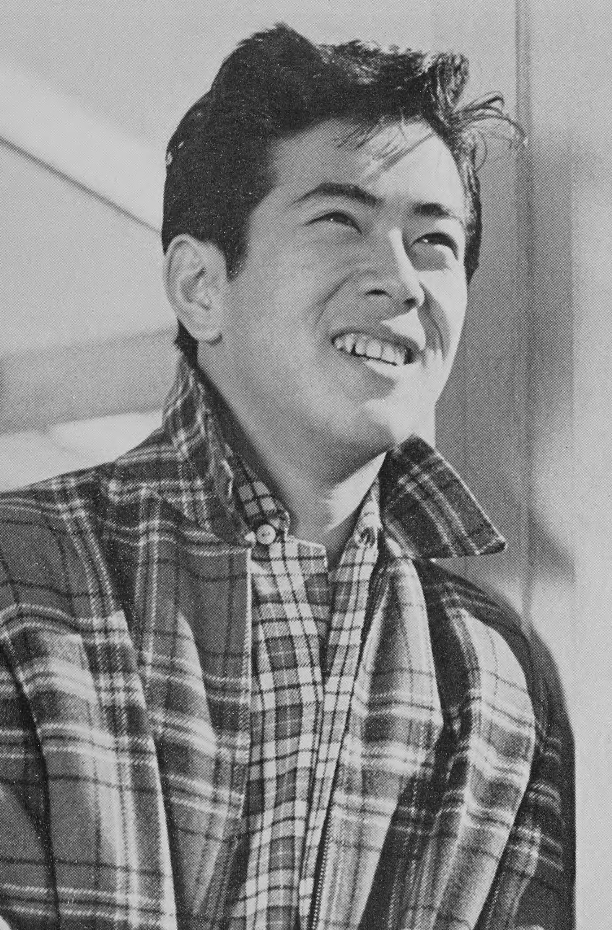
- Kawaguchi (1957)
- Born: 22 August 1936; Tokyo, Japan
- Died: 17 November 1987 (aged 51)
- Occupation: Actor
- Years active: 1956–1987
- Spouse: Hitomi Nozoe (m. 1960)

Hiroshi Kawaguchi (Japanese: 川口 浩, romanized: Kawaguchi Hiroshi, 22 August 1936 – 17 November 1987) was a Japanese film actor. He appeared in more than 50 films between 1956 and 1986. He was born in Tokyo, Japan. Kawaguchi's father, writer Matsutarō Kawaguchi, was an executive at Daiei Film, where Kawaguchi acted. In 1960 he married Daiei actress Hitomi Nozoe.

== Partial filmography ==
- Niji ikutabi (1956) - Kazuhiko Takemiya
- Punishment Room (1956) - Katsumi Shimada
- Studio wa ôsawagi (1956)
- Tsukigata Hanpeita: Hana no maki; Arashi no maki (1956) - Sango Atobe
- Yonjû-hassai no teikô (1956) - Takashi, Kotaro's son
- The Crowded Streetcar (1957) - Tamio Moroi
- Nagasugita haru (1957) - Ikuo Takarabe
- Kisses (1957, directed by Yasuzo Masumura) - Kinichi Miyamoto
- Chijo (1957) - Heiichiro Okawa
- Yūrakuchō de Aimashō (有楽町で逢いましょう) (lit. Lovers in Yurakucho aka Let's Meet in Yurakuchô) (1958) - Takeshi Koyanagi
- Edokko matsuri (1958) - Takechiyo
- The Loyal 47 Ronin (忠臣蔵 Chūshingura) (1958) - Chikara Ōishi
- Aiga (1958)
- Haha (1958) - Eizô Yuasa
- Giants and Toys (1958) - Yôsuke Nishi
- The Lowest Man (1958)
- Futeki na otoko (1958) - Saburô Tateno
- Oyafukô dôri (1958) - Katsuya Sotozaki
- Musume no boken (1958)
- Anata to watashi no aikotoba: Sayônara, konnichiwa (1959) - Kataoka
- Saikô shukun fujin (1959) - Saburo Mihara
- Yoru no togyo (1959) - Hideo Kawashibara
- Bibô ni tsumi ari (1959) - Tadao Shimizu
- Floating Weeds (1959) - Kiyoshi Homma
- Yami o yokogire (1959) - Kunio Ishizuka
- Sexy sign suki suki suki (1960) - Ryôtarô Yamazaki
- Jokyo (1960) - Tabata
- Onna wa teikô suru (1960) - Akira Kuji, the singer
- Shôri to haiboku (1960) - Muneo Yamanaka
- Sure-sure (1960)
- San'nin no kaoyaku (1960) - Shûkichi Môri
- Her Brother (1960) - Hekiro
- San kyôdai no kettô (1960)
- Ginzakko monogatari (1961) - Yûji Takarai
- Ojôsan (1961) - Keiichi Sawai
- Gonin no totsugeki tai (1961) - Pvt. First Class Hashimoto
- Tokyo onigiri musume (1961) - Gorô Shirai
- Nyobo gakko (1961)
- A Wife Confesses (1961) - Osamu Kôda
- Buddha (1961) - Ajātasattu
- Urusai imôtotachi (1961) - Kenji
- Wakai yatsura no kaidan (1961) - Fujiwara
- Shin jinsei gekijô (1961)
- Onna wa yoru kesshô suru (1961)
- Onna no tsurihashi (1961) - Yôji (Episode 1)
- Katei no jijô (1962) - Kazutaka Hirose
- Kurotokage (1962) - Jun Amemiya
- Heiten jikan (1962) - Makoto Ubukata
- Hoseki dorobo (1962) - Kenichi Tachibana
- The Great Wall (1962) - Hsi Liang
- Konto Gojugo-go: Uchu daibôken (1969) - Doguma
- Yoru no têkubari shi: sûke chi hitokirî (1971)
- Kawaguchi Hiroshi Tankentai （川口浩探検隊、Explorer ＆ Adventurer Kawaguchi Hiroshi 1978-1985, TV Series
- Crusher Joe (1983) - Control Room Officer (voice)
- Arion (1986) - (voice)
- Venus Wars (1989) - Tao (voice)
