= A Wife Confesses =

- Directed by: Yasuzo Masumura
- Written by: Masato Ide; Masaya Maruyama (Novel)
- Produced by: Shunsaku Watanabe
- Starring: Ayako Wakao; Hiroshi Kawaguchi; Eitaro Ozawa; Haruko Mabuchi; Jun Negami; Hideo Takamatsu
- Cinematography: Setsuo Kobayashi
- Edited by: Tatsuji Nakashizu
- Music by: Riichiro Manabe
- Production company: Daiei Studios
- Release date: 29 October 1961
- Running time: 91 minutes
- Country: Japan
- Language: Japanese

A Wife Confesses (妻は告白する, Tsuma wa kokuhaku suru) is a 1961 Japanese film directed by Yasuzo Masumura. It was written by Masato Ide based on the novel by Masaya Maruyama. It is a courtroom drama about a young wife on trial for murdering her older husband after cutting his rope whilst mountaineering.

== Cast ==
- Hideo Takamatsu as Kasai
