= Hideo Takamatsu =

Japanese actor (1929–2007)

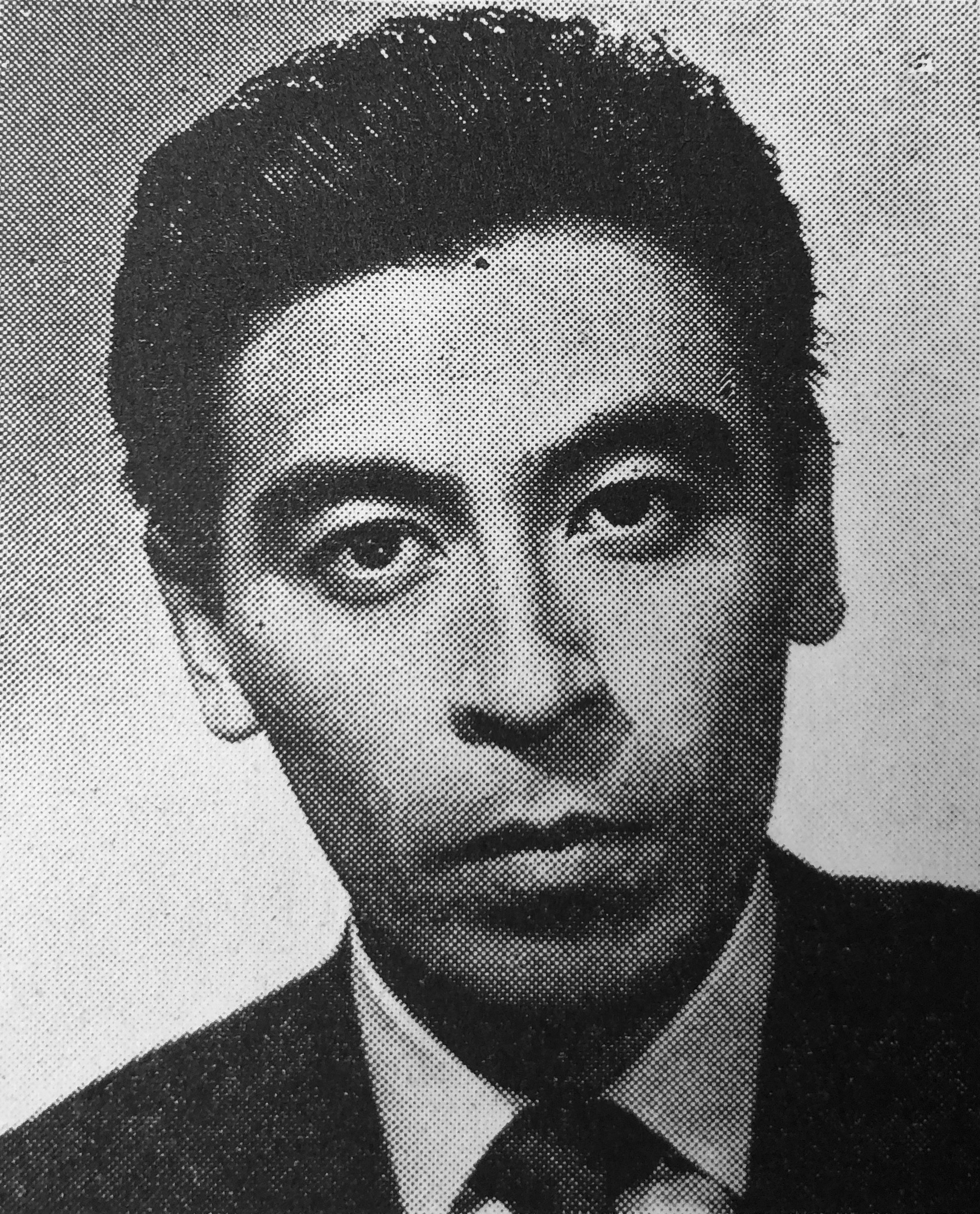
- Hideo Takamatsu
- Born: 24 October 1929; Nankoku, Kōchi Prefecture, Japan
- Died: 26 February 2007 (aged 77)
- Occupation: Actor
- Years active: 1948–2007

Hideo Takamatsu (高松 英郎, Hideo Takamatsu; 24 October 1929 – 26 February 2007) was a Japanese actor from Nankoku, Kōchi Prefecture. Takamatsu appeared in more than 120 films between 1948 and 2007.

== Profile ==
In 1951, he signed his contract with Daiei film company. Two years later, Takamatsu made his film debut with Ikare Sanppie, playing the role of lover of the main character played by Ayako Wakao.

He was highly praised for his performance in such films as Giants and Toys, The Black Report and The Graceful Brute and became a well-reputed supporting actor. In 1962, he left Daiei and became a freelance actor. He won TV Guide Best Performer Award for his role in the Asadora series Kumo no jūtan in 1976. In 1988, Takamatsu played the role of General Takashi Hishikari in The Last Emperor directed by Bernardo Bertolucci.

Takamatsu died of myocardial infarction on February 26, in 2007.

== Selected filmography ==
=== Films ===
- A Girl Isn't Allowed to Love (1955) as Engineer
- Tsukigata Hanpeita: Hana no maki; Arashi no maki (1956) as Akamatsu Daijirō
- Giants and Toys (1958) as Aida Ryuji
- The Snowy Heron (1958) as Tatsumi Yokichi
- Lord Nobunaga's Early Days (1959)
- A False Student (1960) as Prosecutor
- A Wife Confesses (1961) as Kasai
- Black Test Car (1962) as Onoda Toru
- The Graceful Brute (1962) as Katori Ichirō
- The Black Report (1963)
- Yakuza (893) gurentai (1966)
- Shinka 101: Koroshi no Yojimbo (1966)
- Bandits vs. Samurai Squadron (1978) as Yamada Tobei
- Shōgun (1980) as Lord Toda Buntaro
- Eijanaika (1981) as Koide Yamato no Kami
- The Last Emperor (1987) as General Takashi Hishikari
- 226/Four Days of Snow and Blood (1989)
- Shaso (1989) as Okabe Kensuke
- Daikaijū Tōkyō ni arawaru(1998) as Osawa Hikojirō
- Yomigaeri (2003) as Haruo Tsuda

=== Television dramas ===
- Jyudō Ichokusen (1969) as Kuruma Shusaku
- Ten to Chi to (1969) as Kanazu Shinbei
- Daichūshingura (1971) as Kakui Rinzō
- Hissatsu Shiokinin (1973) as Tenjin no Koroku
- Genroku Taiheiki (1975) as Horiuchi Genzaemon
- Kumo no jūtan (1976) as Tone Yu
- Naruto Hichō as Tendō Ikkaku
- Fumō Chitai (1979) as Satoi Tatsuya
- Onihei Hankachō (1980) as Sashima Tadasuke
- Kage no Gundan IV (1985) (ep.16) as Inoue Koshu
- Taiyō ni Hoero! (1985) (ep.648) as Konishi
- Mito Kōmon (1989-1996) as Yamanobe Hyōgō
- Onihei Hankachō (1992) (ep.17) as Suzuka no Matabei
- Hideyoshi (1996) as Hayashi Sado no Kami
- Horibe Yasubei (2007) as Horibe Yahei
