= Yūrakuchō de Aimashō =

- Japanese movie poster
- Directed by: Koji Shima
- Screenplay by: Ryōzō Kasahara
- Story by: Hiroshi Miyazaki
- Produced by: Hidemasa Nagata
- Starring: Machiko Kyō; Hiroshi Kawaguchi; Kenji Sugawara; Hitomi Nozoe; Junko Kano
- Cinematography: Tomohiro Akino
- Edited by: Toyo Suzuki
- Music by: Seitaro Omori
- Production company: Daiei Film
- Distributed by: Daiei Film
- Release date: January 15, 1958 (Japan)
- Running time: 97 minutes
- Country: Japan
- Language: Japanese

Yūrakuchō de Aimashō (Japanese: 有楽町で逢いましょう; lit. Lovers in Yūrakuchō or Let's Meet in Yurakuchô), also known as Chance Meeting, is a 1958 Japanese romantic drama film in technicolor, directed by Koji Shima.

== Film cast ==
- Machiko Kyō as Aya Koyanagi
- Hiroshi Kawaguchi as Takeshi Koyanagi
- Kenji Sugawara as Rentaro Shinohara
- Hitomi Nozoe as Kana Shinohara
- Junko Kano as Fusae Shimazaki
- Tanie Kitabayashi as Tetsu Koyanagi
- Kyu Sazanka as Saburo Maeda
- Chieko Naniwa as Yone
- Michiko Ono as Shinko
- Teruko Kishi as Kinoshita
- Fujio Harumoto as Maruyama
- Yoshiro Kitahara as Shimizu
- Kiyoko Hirai as Mrs. Sekine
- Atsuko Kindaichi as Sekine's daughter
- Yoshihiro Hamaguchi as Hirota
- Frank Nagai as himself (singing)
- Mariko Ogasawara as maid at Koyanagi's
- Minami Satoko as Sadako Yamanaka
- Ryuji Shinagawa as announcer
