= Machiko Kyō =

Japanese actress (1924–2019)

- 京 マチ子
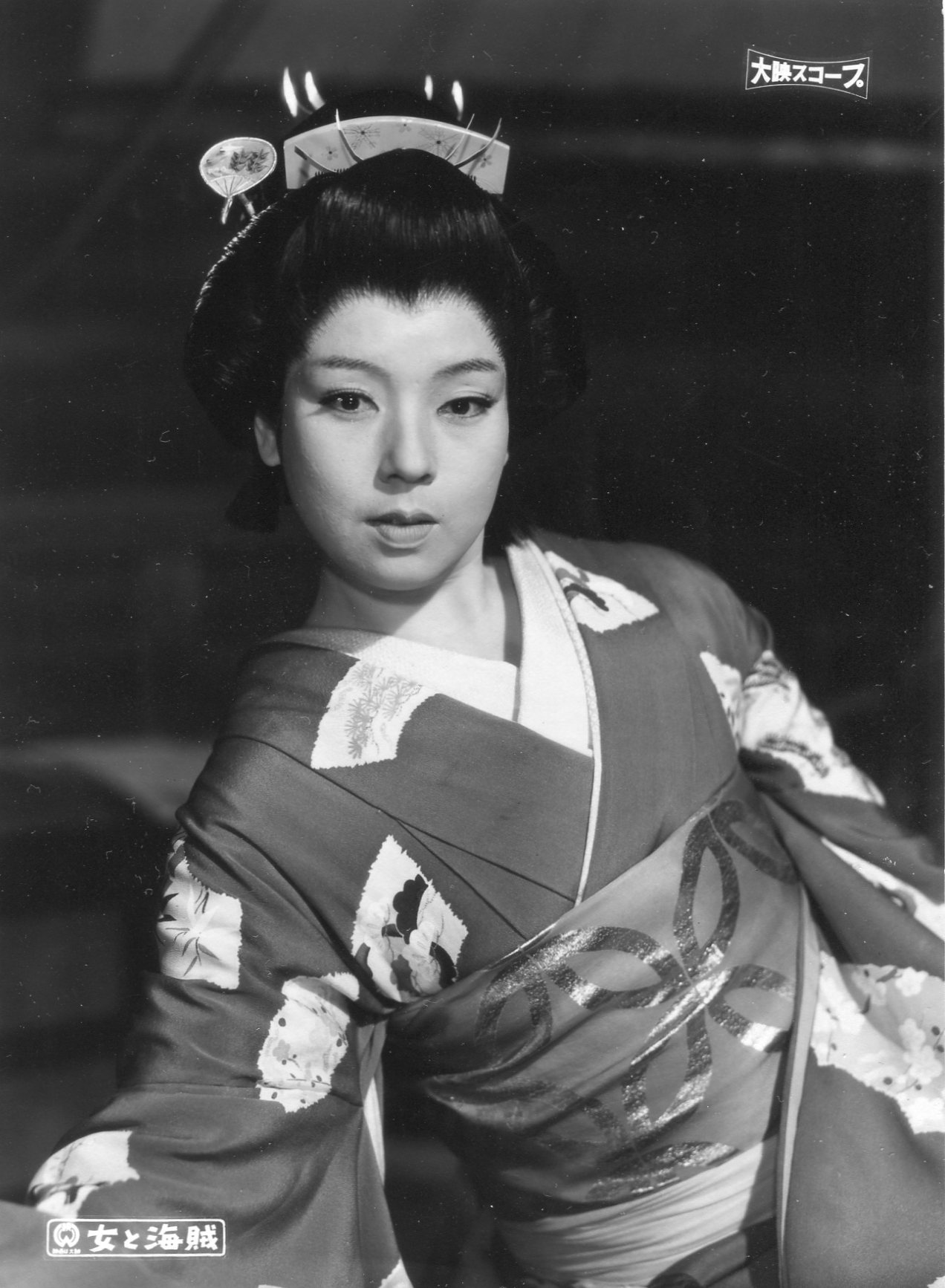
- Kyō in 1959
- Born: Motoko Yano; March 25, 1924; Osaka, Japan
- Died: May 12, 2019 (aged 95); Tokyo, Japan
- Occupation: Actress
- Years active: 1936–2006

Japanese name
- Kanji: 京 マチ子
- Hiragana: きょう マチこ
- Katakana: キョウ マチ コ

Alternative Japanese name
- Kanji: 矢野 元子
- Hiragana: やの もとこ
- Katakana: ヤ ノ モトコ

Motoko Yano, better known as Machiko Kyō (京 マチ子, Kyō Machiko; March 25, 1924 – May 12, 2019), was a Japanese actress who was active primarily in the 1950s. Considered one of Japan's first sex symbols and one of its greatest screen actresses, Kyō is best known for her critically acclaimed work with directors Akira Kurosawa, Yasujirō Ozu, Kenji Mizoguchi, Mikio Naruse, Kon Ichikawa, Teinosuke Kinugasa, Kōzaburō Yoshimura, Shirō Toyoda and Hiroshi Teshigahara, appearing in films such as Rashomon, Ugetsu, Gate of Hell, Street of Shame, Floating Weeds, Odd Obsession and The Face of Another.

Kyō received the Lifetime Achievement Japan Academy Film Prize in 1995. For her contributions to the arts, she received the Japanese government's Medal of Honor with Purple Ribbon and the Order of the Precious Crown (4th Class).

== Early life and education ==
Kyō, an only child, was born Motoko Yano (矢野 元子, Yano Motoko) in Osaka in 1924. Her father left when she was age 5, and she was raised by her mother and grandmother. She adopted Machiko Kyō as her stage name when she entered the Osaka Shochiku Kagekidan in 1936 at age 12.

== Career ==
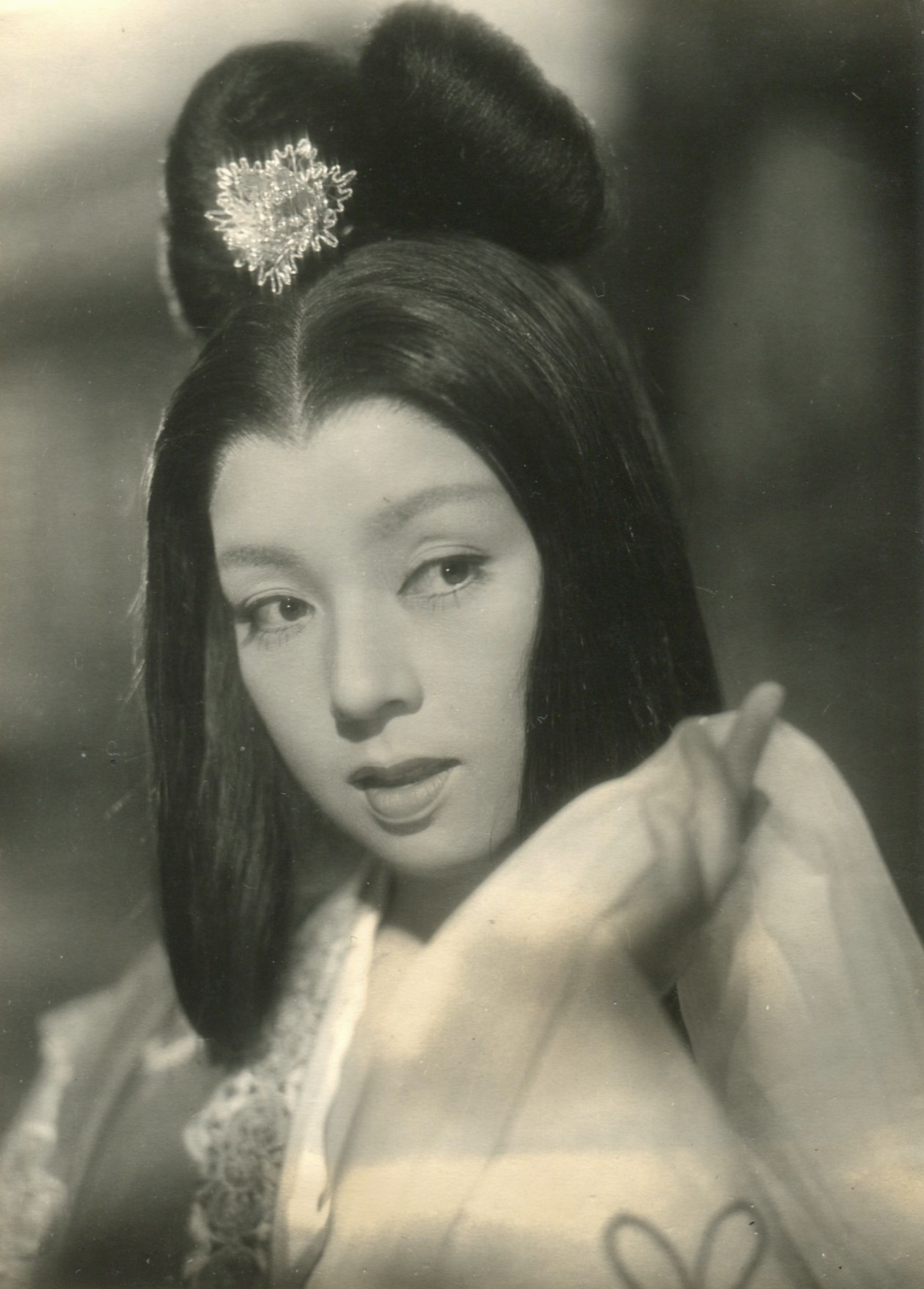
Kyō as the title character in Princess Yang Kwei-Fei (1955)

Kyō trained as a revue dancer and then entered the film industry through Daiei Film in 1949. Two years later, she achieved international fame as the female lead in Akira Kurosawa's film Rashomon, which won first prize at the Venice Film Festival and stunned audiences with its nonlinear narrative.

Kyō starred in many more Japanese productions, including Kenji Mizoguchi's Ugetsu (1953), Teinosuke Kinugasa's Gate of Hell (1953), Kon Ichikawa's Odd Obsession (1959), and Yasujirō Ozu's Floating Weeds (1959).

Her sole role in a non-Japanese film was as Lotus Blossom, the young geisha in The Teahouse of the August Moon (1956), for which she received a Golden Globe nomination for Best Actress in a Motion Picture – Musical or Comedy. She also played the title role in the Japanese-Hong Kong co-production Princess Yang Kwei-Fei (1955), directed by Mizoguchi.

Kyō continued to act through her 80s. Her final role was as Matsuura Shino in the NHK television drama series Haregi Koko Ichiban in 2000. In 2017, she was presented with an award of merit at the 40th Japanese Academy Awards. After retiring from film, she moved back to Osaka, where she resided until her death.

== Personal life ==
Kyō never married, but her romantic relationship with Daiei Film's president Masaichi Nagata was well-publicized in Japan.

Fujiko Yamamoto described Kyo as a very friendly person and loved the older actress like a big sister.

=== Death ===
Kyō died from heart failure at her home in Tokyo on May 12, 2019 at the age of 95. She was the last main surviving cast member of Rashomon.

== Selected filmography ==
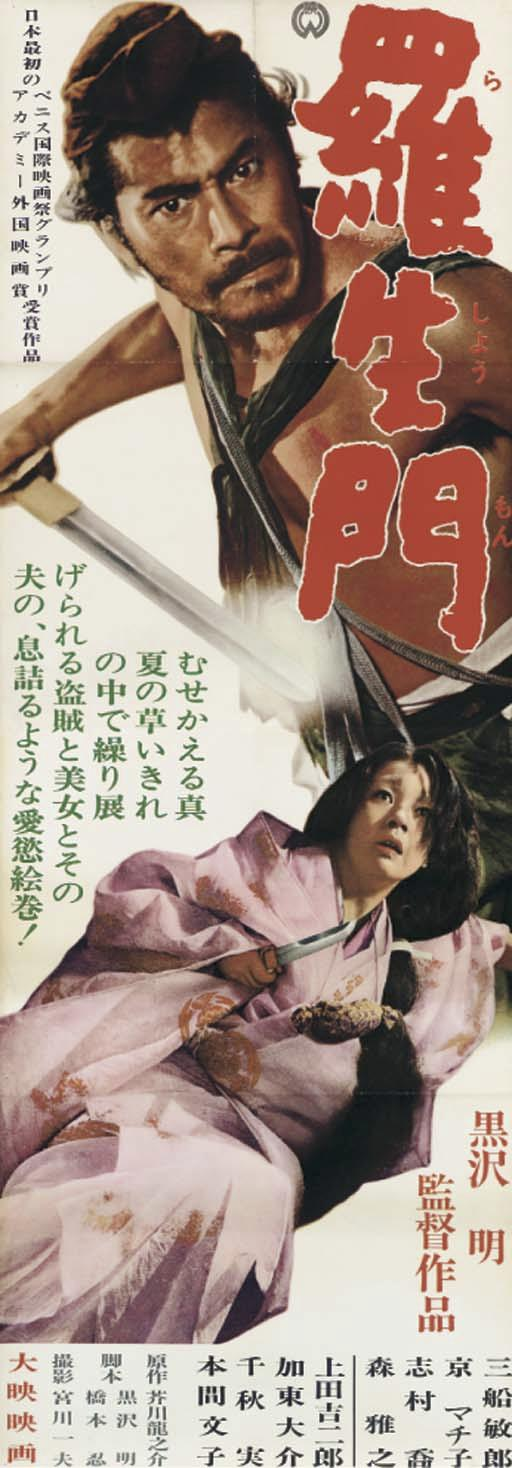
1950 film Rashomon with Toshiro Mifune

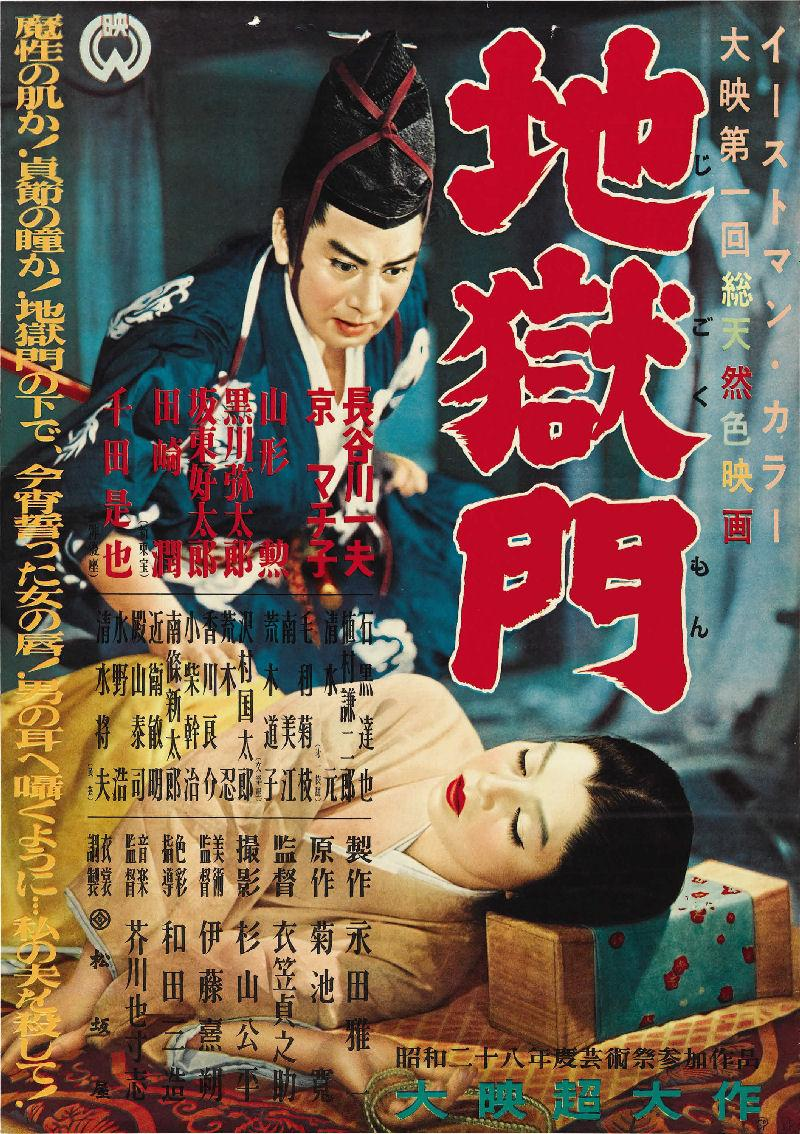
1953 film Jigokumon with Kazuo Hasegawa

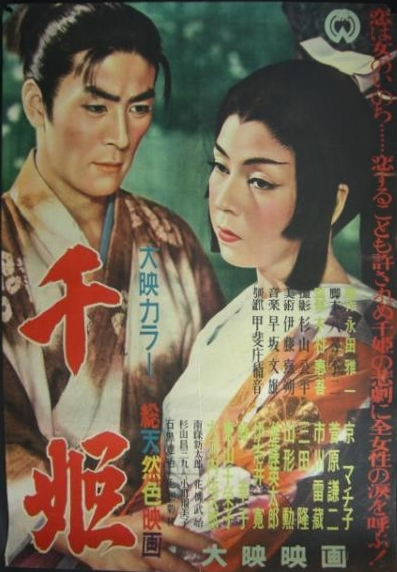
1954 film The Princess Sen with Kenji Sugawara

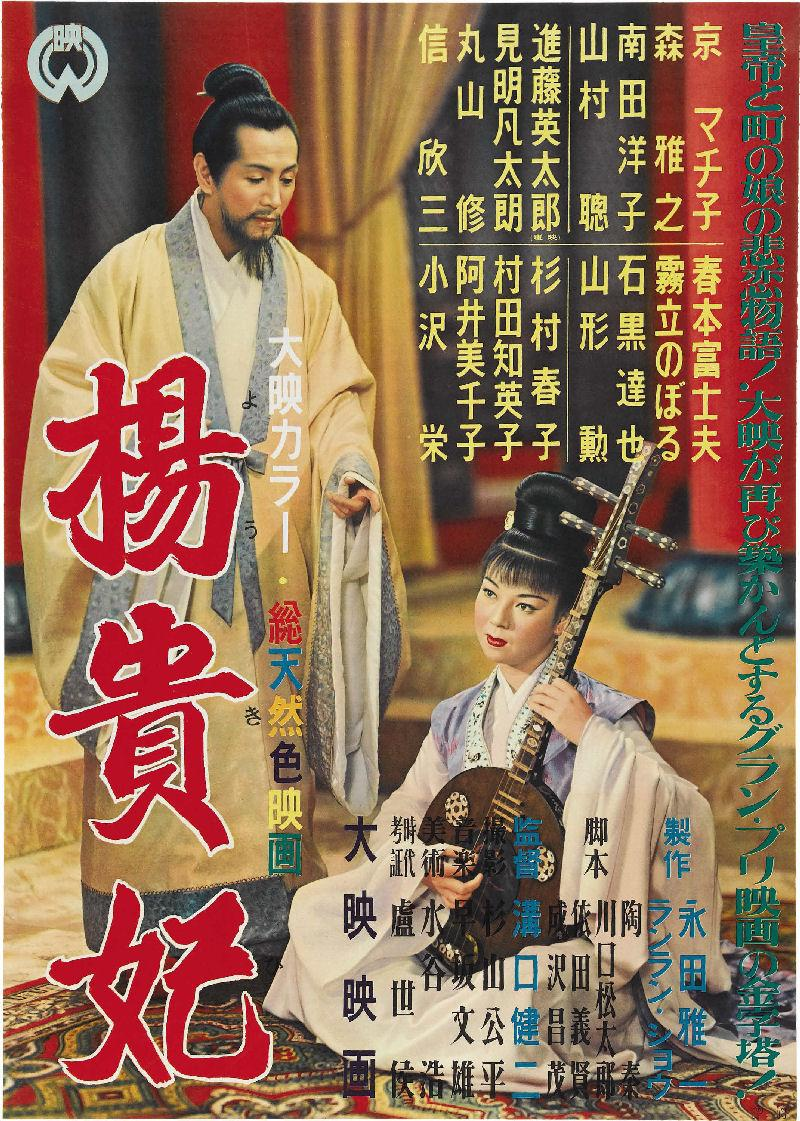
1955 film Princess Yang Kwei-Fei with Masayuki Mori

=== Films ===
- Hana kurabe tanuki-goten (1949) - Aiai, witch
- Chijin no ai (1949) - Naomi
- Harukanari haha no kuni (1950) - Mari, daughter
- Fukkatsu (1950) - Yukiko Ohara
- Rashomon (1950) - Masako Kanazawa
- Hi no tori (1950)
- Itsuwareru seiso (1950) - Kimicho
- Koi no Oranda-zaka (1951) - Chigusa
- Jiyû gakkô (1951) - Yuri
- Joen no hatoba (1951)
- Mesu inu (1951) - Emmy
- Genji monogatari (1951) - Awaji no ue
- Bakurô ichidai (1951) - Yuki
- Asakusa kurenaidan (1952) - Ryûko Beni
- Daibutsu kaigen (1952) - Mayame
- Nagasaki No Uta Wa Wasureji (1952) - Okumura, Ayako
- Taki no Shiraito (1952) - Taki no Shiraito
- Bijo to touzoku (1952) - Sakin
- Kanojo no tokudane (1952)
- Ugetsu (1953) - Lady Wakasa
- Older Brother, Younger Sister (1953) - Mon
- Gate of Hell (1953) - Kesa
- Aru onna (1954) - Yoko Hayazuki
- Shunkin monogatari (1954) - Shunkin
- Asakusa no yoru (1954) - Setsuko Takashima
- The Princess Sen (1954) - the princess Sen
- Bazoku geisha (1954) - Nobukichi
- A Girl Isn't Allowed to Love (1955) - Sachiko Nonomiya
- Princess Yang Kwei-Fei (1955) - Princess Yang Kwei-fei
- Tōjūrō no Koi (1955) - Okaji
- Shin, Heike monogatari: Yoshinaka o meguru sannin no onna (1956) - Tomoe
- Niji ikutabi (1956) - Momoko Mizuhara
- Street of Shame (1956) - Mickey
- Tsukigata Hanpeita: Hana no maki; Arashi no maki (1956) - Hagino
- The Teahouse of the August Moon (1956) - Lotus Blossom
- Itohan monogatari (1957) - Okatsu
- Odoriko (1957) - Chiyomi Hanamura
- Jigoku bana (1957) - Sute
- Yoru no chô (1957) - Mari
- The Hole (1957) - Nagako Kita
- Yūrakuchō de Aimashō (1958) - Aya Koyanagi
- Sorrow Is Only for Women (1958) - Michiko
- The Loyal 47 Ronin (1958) - Orui (spy)
- Haha (1958) - Takako Ômachi
- Ôsaka no onna (1958) - Osen
- Akasen no hi wa kiezu (1958) - Nobuko Araki
- Yoru no sugao (1958) - Akemi
- Satsujin to kenjû (1958)
- Musume no boken (1958)
- Anata to watashi no aikotoba: Sayônara, konnichiwa (1959) - Umeko Ichige
- Sasameyuki (1959) - Sachiko
- Onna to Kaizoku (1959) - Ayaginu / Oito
- Yoru no togyo (1959) - Ryoko Kashiwabara
- Jirôchô Fuji (1959) - Okatsu
- Odd Obsession (1959) - Ikuko / Wife
- Floating Weeds (1959) - Sumiko
- Jokyo (1960) - Omitsu
- Ruten no ôhi (1960) - Ryûko Korinkakura (Hiroko Aishinkakura)
- Bonchi (1960) - Ofuku
- San'nin no kaoyaku (1960) - Chizuru
- Ashi ni sawatta onna (1960) - Saya Shiozawa
- Oden jigoku (1960) - Oden Takahashi
- Konki (1961) - Shizu, Takuo's wife
- Nuregami botan (1961) - Kiyomigata no Omon
- Onna no kunshô (1961) - Shikiko Ohba
- Kodachi o tsukau onna (1961) - Ritsu Ikeda
- Buda (1961) - Nandabala
- Black Lizard (1962) - Mrs. Midorikawa
- Shin no shikôtei (1962)
- Onna no issho (1962) - Kei
- Budda (1962)
- Nyokei kazoku (1963) - Fujiyo Yajima
- Sweet Sweat (1964) - Umeko
- Gendai inchiki monogatari: Dotanuki (1964)
- The Face of Another (1966) - Mrs. Okuyama
- Jinchoge (1966) - Kikuko, Ueno, 1st Daughter
- Chiisai tôbôsha (1966) - Yayoi Yamamura
- Senba zuru (1969) - Chikako Kurimoto
- Genkai yûkyôden: Yabure kabure (1970) - Sue Yoshida
- Karei-naru Ichizoku (1974) - Aiko Takasu
- Kinkanshoku (1955) - Prime Minister's wife
- Kenji Mizoguchi: The Life of a Film Director (1975, documentary) - Herself
- Yoba (1976) - Oshima
- Tora's Pure Love (1976) - Aya Yagyû
- Kesho (1984) - Tsune Tsutano

=== Television ===
- Hissatsu Shimainin (1981)
- Shin Hissatsu Shimainin (1982)
- Hissatsu Shikirinin (1984)
- Hana no Ran (1994) - Hino Shigeko
- Genroku Ryōran (1999) - Keishō'in

== Honors ==
- Medal with Purple Ribbon (1987)
- Order of the Precious Crown, 4th Class, Wisteria (1994)
