= Floating Weeds =

1959 Japanese film by Yasujirō Ozu

- Theatrical release poster
- Japanese: 浮草
- Directed by: Yasujirō Ozu
- Written by: Yasujirō Ozu; Kogo Noda
- Produced by: Masaichi Nagata
- Starring: Machiko Kyō; Hiroshi Kawaguchi; Hitomi Nozoe; Ayako Wakao; Nakamura Ganjirō II; Chishū Ryū; Haruko Sugimura; Kōji Mitsui; Haruo Tanaka; Yosuke Irie; Hikaru Hoshi; Mantarō Ushio
- Cinematography: Kazuo Miyagawa
- Edited by: Toyo Suzuki
- Music by: Kojun Saitō
- Production company: Daiei Film
- Distributed by: Daiei Film
- Release date: November 17, 1959 (Japan)
- Running time: 119 minutes
- Country: Japan
- Language: Japanese

Floating Weeds (Japanese: 浮草, Hepburn: Ukigusa) is a 1959 Japanese drama film directed and co-written by Yasujirō Ozu, starring Nakamura Ganjirō II, Machiko Kyō, Hiroshi Kawaguchi and Haruko Sugimura. It is a remake of Ozu's own black-and-white silent film A Story of Floating Weeds (1934), and follows a troupe of kabuki actors in a small seaside town, where the troupe's aging lead actor has an adult son with his former mistress.

Produced and distributed by Daiei Film, the film was released in Japan on November 17, 1959. Since its initial release, Floating Weeds has been widely acclaimed by both critics and filmmakers, and is considered one of the greatest films ever made.

== Plot ==
During the summer of 1958 at a seaside town on the Inland Sea, a traveling kabuki theater troupe arrives by ship, headed by the troupe's lead actor and owner, Komajuro. While the rest of the troupe goes around town to publicize their show, Komajuro visits his former mistress, Oyoshi, who runs a small eatery in the town. They have a grown-up son, Kiyoshi, who works at the post office as a mail clerk while saving up to study at the university. Kiyoshi does not know Komajuro is his father, having been told he is an uncle. Komajuro and Kiyoshi go fishing at the seaside.

Sumiko, the lead actress of the troupe and Komajuro's current girlfriend, learns that Komajuro is visiting his former mistress, and she becomes jealous. She visits Oyoshi's restaurant, but Komajuro quickly chases her away and confronts her. He tells her to keep away from his son and decides to break up with her, and she calls him an ingrate and reminds him of the times she has gotten him out of trouble.

One day, Sumiko asks Kayo, a young actress in the troupe, to seduce Kiyoshi, offering her some money. Although Kayo is initially reluctant, she succumbs to Sumiko's insistence without being told why. However, after knowing Kiyoshi for some time, Kayo falls for him, and decides to tell Kiyoshi the truth about how their relationship started. Kiyoshi is undaunted and says it does not matter to him.

After seeing Kiyoshi with Kayo, Komajuro confronts Kayo, who tells him of Sumiko's setup, but only after asserting she now loves Kiyoshi and is not doing it for money. Komajuro attacks Sumiko and tells her to disappear from his sight. She pleads for reconciliation, but he is indignant. Kiyoshi and Kayo run away together.

Concurrent with this family drama, the troupe's old-fashioned performances have been failing to attract the town's residents, and the male actors have been pursuing romantic diversions at local businesses, including a brothel and a barber shop. Eventually, the manager of the troupe abandons them and a principal supporting player absconds with the remaining funds. Komajuro has no choice but to disband the troupe, and they meet for a melancholy last night together.

When Komajuro tells Oyoshi about his career troubles, she persuades him to tell Kiyoshi the truth about his parenthood so they can live together as a family. Komajuro agrees, but then Kiyoshi returns with Kayo, and he becomes so enraged that he hits them both repeatedly, leading to a tussle. To stifle the brawl, Oyoshi reveals the truth about Komajuro. Kiyoshi first responds that he had suspected it all along, but then refuses to accept Komajuro as his father, saying he has coped well without one so far, and goes upstairs.

Taking in Kiyoshi's reaction, Komajuro decides to leave after all. Kayo wants to join Komajuro to help him achieve success for the family, but Komajuro asks her to stay to help make Kiyoshi a fine man. She goes to get Kiyoshi, but Komajuro has already left by the time he gets downstairs, and Oyoshi tells Kiyoshi to let his father go.

At the train station, Komajuro tries to light a cigarette, but has no matches. Sumiko, who is sitting nearby, offers him a light. She inquires where he is going and asks to help him start over. They reconcile and board a train to seek work under an impresario at Kuwana.

== Cast ==
- Nakamura Ganjirō II (Note: Nakamura Ganjirō II is the only actor in the cast who was a kabuki actor in real life: he was one of the most influential kabuki actors in the post-World War II era and was the father of the legendary kabuki actor Sakata Tōjūrō IV (one of the greatest kabuki actors in all time and one of the most influential in the Shōwa and Heisei eras).) as Komajuro
- Machiko Kyō as Sumiko, an actress and Komajuro's mistress
- Hiroshi Kawaguchi as Kiyoshi, Komajuro and Oyoshi's son
- Haruko Sugimura as Oyoshi, Kiyoshi's mother
- Ayako Wakao as Kayo, a young actress in the troupe
- Hitomi Nozoe as Aiko, the barber's daughter
- Chishū Ryū as the theater owner
- Kōji Mitsui as Kichinosuke, a troupe member
- Haruo Tanaka as Yatazo, a troupe member
- Mantarō Ushio as Sentaro, a troupe member
- Mutsuko Sakura as O-Katsu, a prostitute
- Natsuko Kahara as Yae, a prostitute
- Toyoko Takahashi as Aiko's mother
- Tatsuo Hanabu as Rokuzaburo, a veteran troupe member
- Tadashi Date as Senshō, a veteran troupe member
- Masahiko Shimazu as Masao, Senshō's grandson
- Hikaru Hoshi as Kimura, the troupe's manager
- Yosuke Irie as Sugiyama, a troupe crew member
- Kumeko Urabe as Shige, a troupe crew member
- Tsûsai Sugawara as a buyer at the bankruptcy

== Production ==
Floating Weeds, Ozu's only film for Daiei, was produced at the studio's urging after he completed Good Morning (1959), which had fulfilled the director's contractual obligation to complete one film per year for Shochiku. Ozu had intended to remake A Story of Floating Weeds for Shochiku in 1958, retitled A Ham Actor (大根役者 daikon yakusha, "radish actor") and starring Eitarō Shindō and Chikage Awashima as the primary leads, Masami Taura and Ineko Arima as the youth leads, and Isuzu Yamada as the former mistress, but filming was delayed due to an unexpectedly mild winter in the Niigata region, where Ozu had hoped to film a snowy location. When the Daiei opportunity arose, he moved filming to a summer setting in seaside Wakayama. The actors were replaced mostly with Daiei contract players, and the title was changed in deference to Nakamura Ganjirō II, the respected kabuki theater star who played the lead (when Kiyoshi charges Komajūrō with hamming it up, the actor asserts that it is the style of acting that his public pays to see).

In a bit of stunt casting, Ozu secured Kōji Mitsui from Shochiku to play Kichinosuke, the character who drives the subplot about the amorous escapades of the troupe's supporting players: the actor (credited as Hideo Mitsui) had portrayed the protagonist's son in the 1934 version of the film. Floating Weeds was Mitsui's seventh and final film for Ozu.

The troupe is seen performing a scene from a play about Chuji Kunisada, a 19th-century historical figure who was romanticised as a forest-dwelling Robin-Hood-like hero in a number of plays, novels, and films. In the scene shown, Kunisada (played by Sumiko) is taking his leave of his faithful companions, Gantetsu and Jōhachi, on Mount Akagi. Wild geese flying south for the winter and crows returning to their nests are used as images of parting. Ozu includes a small joke in the staging of the scene to confirm that this is not a very polished troupe of actors. When Gantetsu delivers the line, "The wild geese are calling as they fly towards the southern skies," he points off-stage into the auditorium. So when Sumiko, as Chuji, turns stage left to deliver the line "And the moon is descending behind the western mountains," she is actually facing east.

Despite Nakamura Ganjirō II's fame as a noted star of kabuki theater, he is shown applying full makeup, but not actually filmed onstage, though he is heard off-screen as the audience watches him perform and players backstage lament the show's poor attendance. Nakamura recalled that he and Machiko Kyo got sick with a cold after filming the confrontation scene between their characters in the rain.

Kazuo Miyagawa served as cinematographer for the film, replacing Ozu's favorite cameraman, Yuharu Atsuta. In an interview, Ozu described the film as an experiment in how to bring life to an old fashioned story in a modern setting, and noted that, by working with Miyagawa, he realized that different colors required varying degrees of lighting.

== Release ==
Criterion Collection DVD Cover for Floating Weeds (1959)

=== Theatrical ===
Floating Weeds was released in Japan on November 17, 1959. It was released theatrically in the United States by Altura Films International on November 24, 1970.

=== Home media ===
In 2004, Floating Weeds was released on Region 1 DVD by The Criterion Collection as a two-disc set with A Story of Floating Weeds. An alternate audio track contains a commentary by Roger Ebert. The two films were re-released by Criterion on a single Region A Blu-ray on May 7, 2024. This new edition of Floating Weeds is based on a 4K digital master with an uncompressed Japanese LPCM 1.0 monaural soundtrack.

English subtitles for the Criterion Collection edition of Floating Weeds alter a comedic exchange involving Kōji Mitsui early in the film. While parading through a village in kabuki costume to promote his troupe, Mitsui's character is asked his name by a prostitute whom he considers unattractive. Instead of using his character's actual name (Kichinosuke), he replies "Kinnosuke." When she reacts with surprise, he claims he is "Kin-chan", jokingly passing himself off as the famous actor Kinnosuke Nakamura, who was popularly known by that diminutive. Despite Mitsui's clear pronunciation, the Criterion subtitles alter the dialogue to have him first identify himself as "Mifune" and then clarify with "Toshiro." This change was likely a localization effort to make the joke recognizable to Western audiences familiar with the name of a more identifiable Japanese star.

== Reception ==
The film is widely acclaimed by film critics. On the review aggregator website Rotten Tomatoes, 100% of 22 critics' reviews of the film are positive; the site's "critics consensus" reads: "Floating Weeds boasts the visual beauty and deep tenderness of director Yasujiro Ozu's most memorable films -- and it's one of the few the master shot in color."

Roger Ebert gave the film four stars out of four, and included it on his "Ten Greatest Films of all Time" list in 1991. Alan Bett of The Skinny gave the film a full five stars. Tom Dawson of BBC gave it four stars out of five. Allan Hunter of Daily Express rated it 4/5, while Stuart Henderson of PopMatters gave it a 9/10. Leonard Maltin gave the film three-and-a-half out of four stars, writing: "Powerful drama is meticulously directed, solidly acted."

In 2002, American film director James Mangold listed Floating Weeds as one of the best films of all time. He said: "Ozu is the world's greatest director film geeks have never heard of. A poet, humanitarian, stylist, innovator - and a brilliant actors' director. I would recommend the film to anyone with a heart who knows direction is about more than camera moves." In 2009, the film was ranked at No. 36 on the list of the Greatest Japanese Films of All Time by Japanese film magazine Kinema Junpo. In 2012, Spanish film director José Luis Guerín, as well as two other directors, listed the film as one of the greatest ever made.
