= Ayako Wakao =

Japanese actress (born 1933)

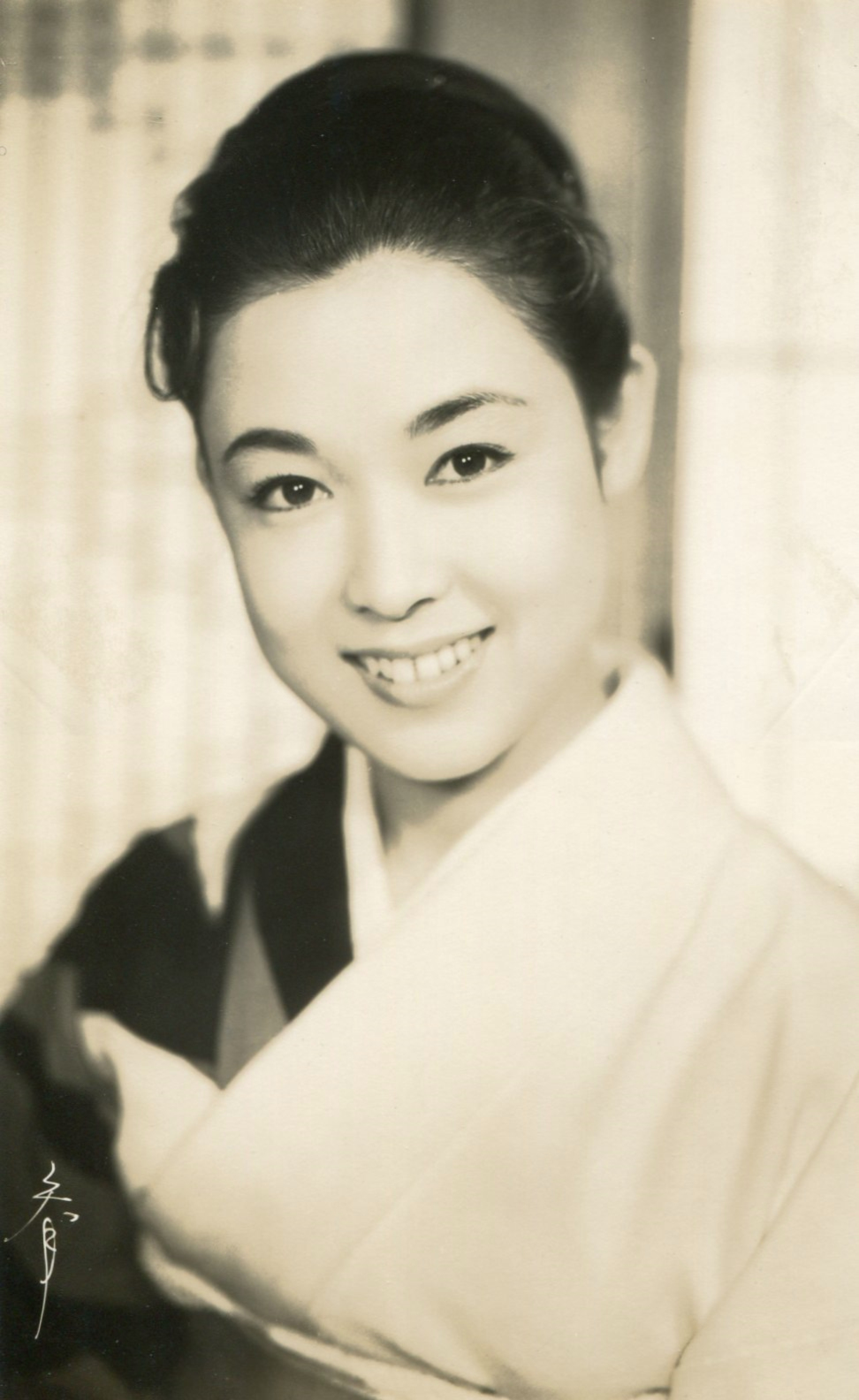
- Ayako Wakao in 1950s
- Born: November 8, 1933 (age 92); Tokyo, Japan
- Occupation: Actress
- Years active: 1952–present
- Spouses: Hiroyuki Nishidate (m. 1963; div. 1969); Kisho Kurokawa (m. 1983; died 2007)

Ayako Wakao (若尾 文子, Wakao Ayako; born November 8, 1933, in Tokyo, Japan) is a Japanese actress who was one of the country's biggest stars of the 20th century.

== Biography ==
Wakao began her career contracted to Daiei Studios in 1951 as part of the fifth "New Face" group. She has gone on to appear in over 100 feature films, plus numerous television movies and series. She was a favorite actress of director Yasuzo Masumura, starring in 20 of his films. In addition to her many collaborations with Masumura, she was a favorite of Kon Ichikawa, having starred or co-starred in seven of the director's works. She appeared in Kenji Mizoguchi's A Geisha and Street of Shame. She also appeared in Yasujirō Ozu's Floating Weeds. Yuzo Kawashima made three films A Geisha's Diary, The Temple of Wild Geese and The Graceful Brute with her.

Wakao married architect Kisho Kurokawa in 1983. They did not have children. In 2007, both ran unsuccessful campaigns for seats in the upper house of the Japanese Parliament, before Kurokawa died in October of that year.

== Selected filmography ==
=== Films ===
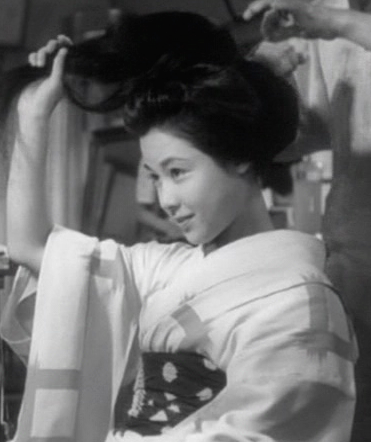
In A Geisha (1953)

Year	Title	Role	Notes	Ref.
1952	Shi no machi o Nogarete	Setsuko Minami		
1952	Mōjū Tsukai no Shōjo	Aiko		
1952	Tomorrow Will Be a Sunday	Momoko Yamabuki	Lead	
1953	Teen-Ager's Sex Manual	Eiko Takanashi	Lead	
1953	A Geisha	Eiko/Miyoei	Lead	
1953	Jūdai no Yūwaku		Lead	
1955	A Girl Isn't Allowed to Love	Yumiko Kiryu	Lead	
1955	The Phantom Horse	Yuki Shiraishi	Lead	
1956	Street of Shame	Yasumi	Lead	
1957	Suzakumon	Princess Kazu	Lead	
1957	The Blue Sky Maiden	Yuko	Lead	
1958	The Loyal 47 Ronin	Osuzu		
1959	Floating Weeds	Kayo		
1960	Afraid to Die	Yoshie Koizumi	Lead	
1960	A False Student	Mutsuko	Lead	
1960	A Woman's Testament	Kimi	Lead	
1961	A Wife Confesses	Saeko Takigawa	Lead	
1961	A Geisha's Diary	Koen	Lead	
1962	The Temple of Wild Geese	Satoko Kirihara	Lead	
1962	The Graceful Brute	Yukie Mitani	Lead	
1963	An Actor's Revenge	Namiji		
1964	Manji	Mitsuko Tokumitsu	Lead	
1966	Irezumi	Oen	Lead	
1966	Red Angel	Sakura Nishi	Lead	
1968	The Saga of Tanegashima	Wakasa		
1970	Zatoichi Meets Yojimbo	Umeno		
1971	Tora-san's Shattered Romance	Yūko Akashi		
1975	Kenji Mizoguchi: The Life of a Film Director	Herself	Documentary	
1987	Princess from the Moon	Tayoshime		
2005	Spring Snow	Gesshuji monzeki		

=== Television ===
Year	Title	Role	Notes	Ref.
1972	Shin Heike Monogatari	Tokiwa Gozen	Taiga drama	
1975	Genroku Taiheiki	Someko	Taiga drama	
1988	Takeda Shingen	Lady Ōi, narrator	Taiga drama	
1998	Tokugawa Yoshinobu	Yoshiko	Taiga drama	
2003	Musashi	Yodo-dono	Taiga drama	
2011	Sunshine	Old Yōko Maruyama, narrator	Asadora	

== Awards and nominations ==
Year	Award	Category	Work(s)	Result	Ref.
1962	12th Blue Ribbon Awards	Best Actress	A Wife Confesses, A Geisha's Diary, and The Age of Marriage	Won	
1962	35th Kinema Junpo Awards	Best Actress	A Wife Confesses and A Geisha's Diary	Won	
1966	16th Blue Ribbon Awards	Best Actress	Seisaku's Wife and Nami Kage	Won	
1966	39th Kinema Junpo Awards	Best Actress	Seisaku's Wife and Nami Kage	Won	
1969	42nd Kinema Junpo Awards	Best Actress	One Day at Summer's End, The House of Wooden Blocks, and The Time of Reckoning	Won	
2006	60th Mainichi Film Awards	Kinuyo Tanaka Award	Lifetime Achievement	Won	
