= The Princess Sen =

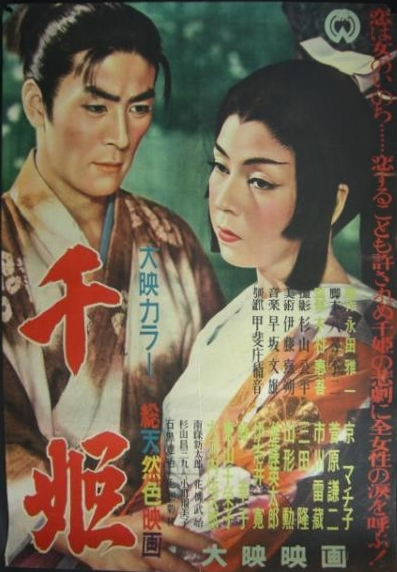
- Japanese movie poster
- Directed by: Keigo Kimura
- Music by: Fumio Hayasaka
- Production company: Daiei Film
- Release date: October 20, 1954
- Running time: 95 minutes
- Country: Japan
- Language: Japanese

The Princess Sen (千姫, Sen-hime) is a color 1954 Japanese film directed by Keigo Kimura.

== Cast ==
Actor	Role
Machiko Kyō	the princess Sen
Kenji Sugawara	Yuasa shin'roku
Raizo Ichikawa	Toyotomi Hideyori
Takashi Mita	Honda Heihachirō
Isao Yamagata	Sakazaki Naomori, governor or Dewa
Eitarō Shindō	Honda Masanobu
Kan Ishii	Tokugawa Hidetada
Chieko Higashiyama	Yodo-dono
Denjirō Ōkōchi	Tokugawa Ieyasu

== See also ==
- Senhime
