= A Geisha =

1953 film by Kenji Mizoguchi

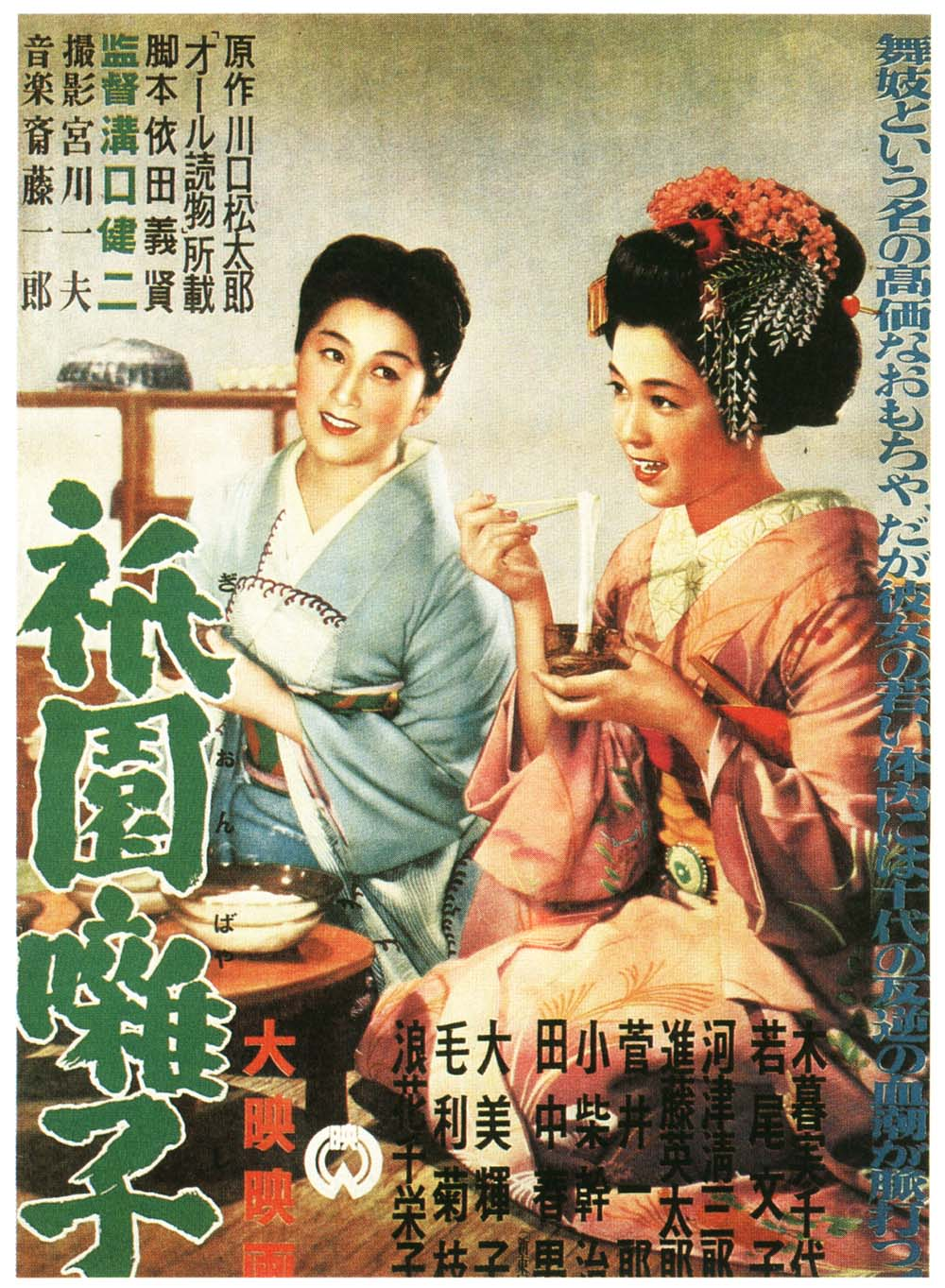
- Original Japanese movie poster
- Directed by: Kenji Mizoguchi
- Written by: Yoshikata Yoda (screenplay); Matsutaro Kawaguchi (novel)
- Produced by: Hisakazu Tsuji
- Starring: Michiyo Kogure; Ayako Wakao; Seizaburō Kawazu
- Cinematography: Kazuo Miyagawa
- Edited by: Mitsuzo Miyatai
- Music by: Ichirō Saitō
- Production company: Daiei Film
- Distributed by: Daiei Film
- Release date: 12 August 1953
- Running time: 85 minutes
- Country: Japan
- Language: Japanese

A Geisha or Gion Festival Music (祇園囃子, Gion Bayashi) is a 1953 Japanese drama film directed by Kenji Mizoguchi, centred on the geisha milieu in post-war Gion, Kyoto. It is based on a novel by Matsutarō Kawaguchi.

== Plot ==
Eiko is in the search of the okiya (geisha house) run by the geisha Miyoharu. As she approaches the screen doors, she witnesses an exchange between Miyoharu and a client. The client, greatly indebted and unable to afford Miyoharu's services, is coldly and mockingly berated by Miyoharu for his presumptuousness. Enraged by the sudden demise of her affected desire for him and her mercenary attitude, he tries to assault her but is thwarted and summarily evicted by Miyoharu's servants. As he sees the client off the premises, one of the servants finds Eiko at the door and invites her inside.

In supplication, Eiko reveals that the death of her mother has left her at the mercy of her uncle, who demands that Eiko repay the debt incurred by her mother's funeral expenses by rendering sexual services to him. She pleads with Miyoharu to take her on as a maiko (apprentice geisha). Miyoharu attempts to dissuade her, on the grounds that life as a geisha is difficult and the training exceptionally arduous, but in the face of Eiko's determination she finds sympathy for the girl's situation and concedes. She sends her servant to procure the formal consent of Eiko's father, a struggling businessman, but he refuses to grant permission on the grounds that Eiko has shamed him by choosing to enter her mother's profession.

Eiko has achieved the necessary level of training to be formally introduced as a maiko under her professional name Miyoei. In order to make the arrangements for her debut. Okimi, the proprietor, grudgingly assents to assist her with the money. In Okimi's teahouse, the two geisha are seated with Kusuda and his associate, who are in the process of convincing a manager on the verge of promotion to the directorship of another prosperous company.

Kanzaki is instantly taken with Miyoharu and strokes her arm during a subsequent dance recital performed by other attending geisha. Kusuda preys upon the vulnerable Miyoei, by pouring her consecutive glasses of sake that she is obliged by etiquette to drink, despite Miyoharu's remonstrations.

Miyoei asks her instructor about her rights as set out under the post-war constitution, and on her rights should a client desire to force himself upon her. The instructor answers that while she does indeed have these rights, it would be unthinkable for her to refuse a client. Miyoharu is extremely resistant to the proposal, although when Okimi reveals that she borrowed the money for Miyoei's debut from Kusuda on the promise that he would be entitled to take her on later, Miyoharu is obliged to take it under consideration. Okimi also suggests that Miyoharu herself take on a patron, to assure her future and Miyoei's.

Later, at the teahouse, Okimi tries to directly persuade the recalcitrant Miyoei to accede to Kusuda's proposal. Miyoei manages to remain aloof and promises to think on it. While Miyoharu entertains Kanzaki, Kusuda forces himself on Miyoei, causing Miyoei to bite him off to defend herself.

They encounter Miyoei's father, who has fallen on extremely hard times and tells Miyoharu that his debts have become so crippling that suicide will soon be his only resort.

Kusuda's associate explains to Okimi that while they are prepared to 'forgive' Miyoei for her treatment of Kusuda, their principal concern is with Miyoharu's reluctance to aid them in seducing Kanzaki, which must be remedied before they can continue to patronise the teahouse. Okimi arranges a meeting with Miyoharu, who she sharply criticises for her insolence in thwarting a client's desires and demeaning her profession. Okimi flaunts her influence over Miyoharu, threatening to cut off her custom, but Miyoharu refuses to relinquish either herself to Kanzaki or Miyoei to Kusuda.

As a consequence of her refusal, all Miyoharu's engagements are called off by teahouse proprietors afraid of Okimi's influence, despite district regulations prohibiting the inhibition of other establishments' custom by any one proprietor. Miyoei's father, in a pathetic state, also pays Miyoharu a visit as his last recourse to secure a loan and save his life from his debtors. While highly critical of his hypocrisy in seeking assistance from the earnings of the daughter he disowned, she offers him her last remaining possessions.

Despite Miyoharu's support for her actions to defend her rights and insistence that she maintain her dignity, Miyoei defies her and presents herself to Okimi to be taken to Kusuda. Okimi is obliged to call Miyoharu to obtain her formal consent, which Miyoharu denies.

Miyoharu returns to the okiya laden with gifts for Miyoei. Wary of the sudden change in their fortunes, Miyoei demands to know whether Miyoharu prostituted herself to Kanzaki and threatens to leave if her suspicions are confirmed. Miyoharu is forced to admit that she did, but it was just to protect Miyoei because she is the closest person she has to family, and the two reconcile.

== Cast ==
- Michiyo Kogure as Miyoharu
- Ayako Wakao as Eiko/Miyoei
- Seizaburō Kawazu as Kusuda
- Eitarō Shindō as Sawamoto
- Ichirō Sugai as Saeki
- Kanji Koshiba as Kanzaki
- Chieko Naniwa as Okimi
- Sumao Ishihara as Kōkichi
- Saburō Date as Imanishi
- Haruo Tanaka as Ogawa
- Kikue Mōri as Instructor at geisha school
- Midori Komatsu as O-ume
- Emiko Yanagi as Kaname

== Reception and legacy ==
A Geisha received the 1954 Blue Ribbon Award for Best Supporting Actor (Eitarō Shindō) and for Best Supporting Actress (Chieko Naniwa).

The film is regarded as one of Mizoguchi's major works by critics and historians, described as "elegantly made [...] and poignant in the extreme" (Geoff Andrew, Time Out), "incredibly beautiful" and "compassionate but completely unsentimental" (Vincent Canby, The New York Times), and "a very severe criticism of the geisha tradition" (Donald Richie/Joseph L. Anderson, The Japanese Film – Art & Industry). The New York Times included the film in its The Best 1,000 Movies Ever Made list.
