= A False Student =

1960 film directed by Yasuzō Masumura

- Directed by: Yasuzō Masumura
- Written by: Yoshio Shirasaka; Kenzaburō Ōe (story)
- Produced by: Yūkō Nakaizumi
- Starring: Ayako Wakao
- Cinematography: Hiroshi Murai
- Edited by: Tatsuji Nakashizu
- Music by: Toshirō Mayuzumi
- Production company: Daiei
- Distributed by: Daiei
- Release date: 8 October 1960
- Running time: 94 minutes
- Country: Japan
- Language: Japanese

A False Student (偽大学生, Nise daigakusei) is a 1960 Japanese drama film directed by Yasuzō Masumura. It is based on the story Gisho no toki by Japanese writer Kenzaburō Ōe.

== Plot ==
For the fourth time in a row, Hikoichi has failed to pass the exams to enter a prestigious university. He lies to his mother, a shop owner and widow who hopes for a brighter future for her son, that he passed the exams, and walks around in a student's uniform, pretending to be a freshman. When student activist leader Soratani is arrested by the police, he mistakes Hikoichi for a fellow student and orders him to bring the news of his arrest to his zengakuren comrades. Hikoichi, eager to be accepted by the activists as one of them, and trying to impress student Mutsuko, participates in a rally where many protestors are arrested. After his quick dismissal by the police, who realise that he is neither a student nor a political agitator, the activists suspect Hikoichi to be an informant.

== Cast ==
- Ayako Wakao as Mutsuko
- Jerry Fujio as Hikoichi
- Jun Fujimaki as Yasuo Kida
- Eiji Funakoshi as Kyosuke
- Jūzō Itami as Soratani (credited Ichizo Itami)
- Kaneko Iwasaki as Kinuko
- Hideo Takamatsu as Prosecutor
- Sachiko Murase as Hikoichi's mother
- Nobuo Nakamura as Takagi
