= Red Angel (film) =

- Poster
- Directed by: Yasuzō Masumura
- Written by: Ryōzō Kasahara
- Based on: Akai Tenshi by Yoriyoshi Arima
- Produced by: Ikuo Kubodera
- Starring: Ayako Wakao; Shinsuke Ashida
- Cinematography: Setsuo Kobayashi
- Edited by: Tatsuji Nakashizu
- Music by: Sei Ikeno
- Production company: Daiei Film
- Release dates: 1 October 1966 (Japan); 1 April 1971 (US)
- Running time: 95 minutes
- Country: Japan
- Language: Japanese

Red Angel (赤い天使, Akai Tenshi) is a 1966 Japanese drama war film directed by Yasuzō Masumura. It tells the story of a young Japanese nurse on the front lines in China during the Second Sino-Japanese War. It is based on a 1966 novel of the same name by Yoriyoshi Arima (ja).

== Plot ==
Sakura Nishi is a Japanese nurse in China during the Second Sino-Japanese war. Initially she works in a ward of chronically ill men. She is raped by a patient, Sakamoto. She reports the rape and Sakamoto is sent to the front lines. Nishi is sent to a field hospital. The hospital is overwhelmed and has too few doctors and not enough medicine to treat all the patients. Nishi works with Doctor Okabe. Sakamoto comes in, shot in the belly and dying. Okabe refuses to provide him with a blood transfusion, reasoning that Sakamoto is beyond saving, but Nishi pleads with him. Okabe tries to save Sakamoto on condition that Nishi will come to his room that night. Sakamoto dies, but Nishi goes to Okabe's room. However, Okabe just wants to talk to Nishi and drink his French wine with her. He asks her to inject him with morphine and then sleeps. Shortly thereafter, Nishi takes pity on a man who has lost his arms, and forms a sexual relationship with him. When she puts an end to the relationship, and the man concludes that he's likely never to experience a similar relationship again, he commits suicide.

Okabe and Nishi and two other nurses are sent to a village on the front line. A comfort woman in the village has been infected with cholera and the cholera spreads to the soldiers. Okabe tries to set up hygiene, but the soldiers behave like wild animals, trying to rape the nurses. The soldiers become ill and the village cannot be defended. On the eve of an anticipated attack, Nishi helps Okabe through withdrawals from his morphine use which had left Okabe impotent. The two have sex and affirm their love for one another. The Chinese Army attack the village. When Nishi awakens the next morning, she finds that she is the only survivor. A group of Japanese soldiers appear and declare they have fought back the attackers, but Nishi tells them to keep away to avoid becoming infected. She looks through the site of the battle until she finds Okabe's corpse, which she embraces.
