= A Woman's Testament =

1960 Japanese film

Jokyo
- Theatrical poster
- Directed by: Kōzaburō Yoshimura; Kon Ichikawa; Yasuzō Masumura
- Written by: Shôfû Muramatsu; Toshio Yasumi
- Produced by: Masaichi Nagata
- Starring: Ayako Wakao; Fujiko Yamamoto; Machiko Kyō
- Cinematography: Hiroshi Murai
- Edited by: Tatsuji Nakashizu
- Distributed by: Daiei Film
- Release date: 14 January 1960 (Japan)
- Running time: 101 minutes
- Country: Japan
- Language: Japanese

A Woman's Testament (女経, Jokyō) is a 1960 Japanese drama anthology film directed by Kōzaburō Yoshimura, Kon Ichikawa and Yasuzō Masumura.

== Plot ==
The film consists of three stories revolving around women. The first story is about a young woman who works in a Tokyo nightclub. She has what seems like a good plan for a strong financial future; she is investing in a company on the one hand, and on the other, taking action to snare the son of the company's owner in marriage. In the second story, a young woman is employed by a real estate agent in order to convince male clients to invest in worthless property, usually by bathing with them. The last story is about a widowed geisha who has no financial worries. But when she falls in love with a forger, she opts to wait for him after he is sent to prison. This causes trouble for her in family and society, but she ignores them despite the pressure.

== Cast ==
Episode 1 (directed by Yasuzo Masumura)

- Ayako Wakao as Kimi
- Hiroshi Kawaguchi as Tabata
- Sachiko Hidari as Satsuki
- Jirō Tamiya as Harumoto
- Chieko Murata as Otatsu

Episode 2 (directed by Kon Ichikawa)

- Fujiko Yamamoto as Tsuneko
- Eiji Funakoshi as Yasushi
- Hitomi Nozoe as the girl

Episode 3 (directed by Kōzaburō Yoshimura)

- Machiko Kyō as Omitsu
- Nakamura Ganjirō II as Gosuke
- Junko Kano as Yumiko
- Jun Negishi as Kanemitsu

== Release ==
A Woman's Testament was screened at the 10th Berlin International Film Festival.
