= Michiyo Kogure =

Japanese actress (1918–1990)

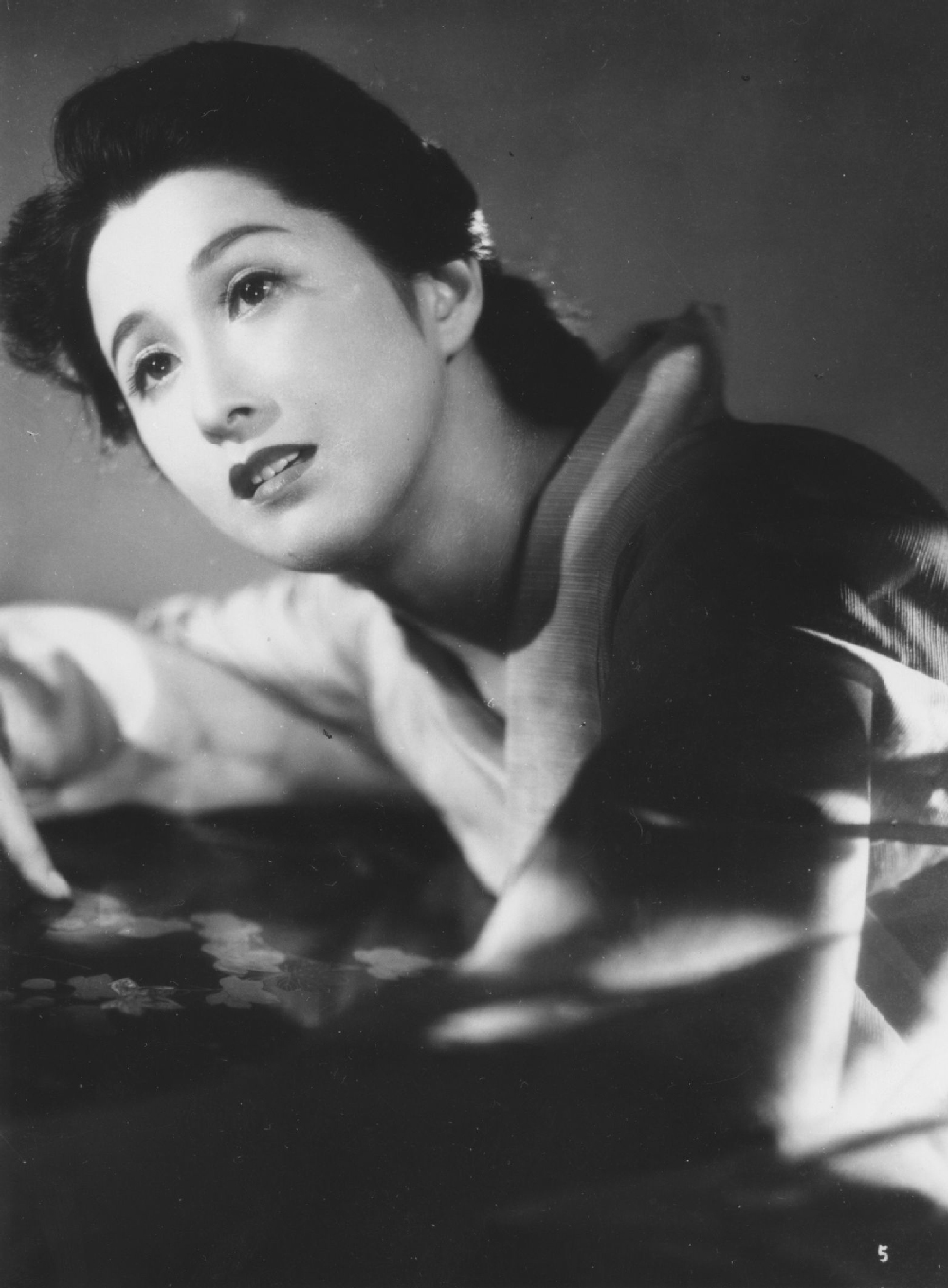
- Michiyo Kogure in Portrait of Madame Yuki (1950)
- Born: 31 January 1918; Shimonoseki, Yamaguchi, Japan
- Died: 13 June 1990 (aged 72)
- Other name: Tsuma Wada
- Occupation: Actress
- Years active: 1939–1984
- Spouse: Hideyoshi Wada (1944–1990)

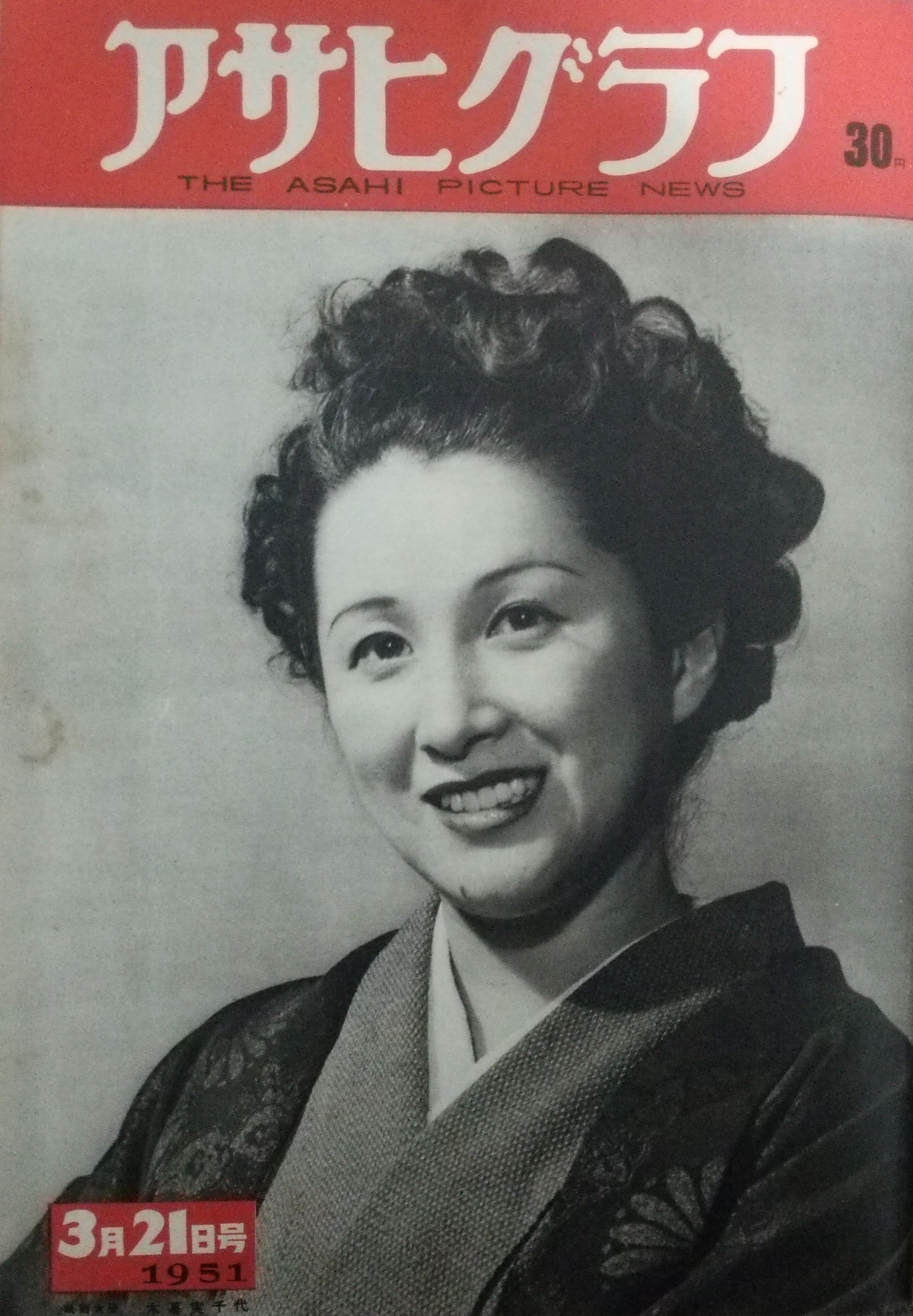
Kogure on the cover of Asahi Graph (March 1951)

Michiyo Kogure (木暮実千代, Kogure Michiyo) (31 January 1918 – 13 June 1990) was a Japanese film actress. She appeared in nearly 200 films in a career which spanned 45 years, starring in works by Akira Kurosawa, Kenji Mizoguchi, Yasujirō Ozu, Mikio Naruse, and others. Film historian Donald Richie once called her "[o]ne of Japan's most versatile actresses, and perhaps the most intellectual of all in her approach to acting."

== Biography ==
Michiyo Kogure was born in Shimonoseki, Yamaguchi Prefecture, Japan, and graduated from Nihon University in 1940. While still a student, she joined the Shochiku film studios and gave her screen debut in 1939. She worked for directors such as Hiroshi Shimizu, Heinosuke Gosho and Kōzaburō Yoshimura, before following her husband to Manchuria in 1944. Upon her return two years later, she starred again in films by Shochiku, but also Toho, Daiei and other studios, and repeatedly appeared in films by Mizoguchi and Shimizu. She received the 1949 Mainichi Film Award for Best Supporting Actress for her performance in Aoi sanmyaku.

In addition to her appearances in films and commercials, Kogure volunteered in charity work. In 1976, she was awarded the Medal with Dark Blue Ribbon.

== Selected filmography ==
=== Films ===
- Akatsuki no gassho (1941)
- Drunken Angel (1948)
- Lady from Hell (1949)
- Aoi sanmyaku (1949)
- Portrait of Madame Yuki (1950)
- Fireworks over the Sea (1951)
- The Tale of Genji (1951)
- Rikon (1952)
- Okuni to Gohei (1952)
- The Flavor of Green Tea over Rice (1952)
- Senbazuru (1953)
- A Geisha (1953)
- Samurai II: Duel at Ichijoji Temple (1955)
- Shin Heike monogatari (1955)
- Jirō monogatari (1955)
- Street of Shame (1956)
- Night School (1956)
- Sisters of the Gion (1956)
- Kiri no oto (1956)
- Freelance Samurai (1957)
- The Loyal 47 Ronin (1958)
- Akō Rōshi (1961)
- Kenji Mizoguchi: The Life of a Film Director (1975)
- Tora-san, the Matchmaker (1979)

=== Television ===
- The Yagyu Conspiracy (1978)
- Kusa Moeru (1979)
