= Giants and Toys =

1958 Japanese film

- Film poster
- Directed by: Yasuzo Masumura
- Written by: Yoshio Shirasaka; Takeshi Kaikō (short story)
- Produced by: Hidemasa Nagata; Hiroaki Fujii
- Starring: Hiroshi Kawaguchi; Hitomi Nozoe
- Cinematography: Hiroshi Murai
- Edited by: Tatsuji Nakashizu
- Music by: Tetsuo Sukahara
- Production company: Daiei
- Distributed by: Daiei
- Release date: 22 June 1958 (Japan)
- Running time: 95 minutes
- Country: Japan
- Language: Japanese

Giants and Toys (巨人と玩具, Kyojin to gangu), also titled The Build-Up, is a 1958 Japanese satirical comedy film directed by Yasuzo Masumura based on a story by Takeshi Kaikō.

== Plot ==
Candy manufacturer World competes with companies Giant and Apollo over caramel sales. While looking for a poster girl for a new promotional campaign, chief of advertising Goda discovers Kyoko, a working class girl with bad teeth, and makes her World's mascot, dressed up in a space suit and wielding a ray gun. Meanwhile, Goda's assistant Nishi, at the instruction of his boss, has an affair with Apollo's advertising lady Kurahashi to learn about their campaign plans. As Kyoko's popularity rises to unprecedented heights, the young woman is less and less inclined to go along with World's plans for her, working on a career as a singer and dancer. After Kyoko terminates their contract, Goda, sick from professional stress to the point of coughing up blood, wants to take over her role. Nishi, worried about his boss's health, stops him and takes over the role of the mascot himself. Dressed in Kyoko's spacesuit and wielding a ray gun, Nishi patrols the streets, followed by Kurahashi who prompts him to smile a bright smile for the passers-by.

== Cast ==
- Hiroshi Kawaguchi as Yōsuke Nishi
- Hitomi Nozoe as Kyōko Shima
- Yūnosuke Itō as Junji Harukawa
- Michiko Ono as Masami Kurahashi
- Kyu Sazanka as Takakura Higashi
- Kinzō Shin as Kōhei
- Hideo Takamatsu as Ryuji Goda

== Production ==
Giants and Toys originated as a short story written by Takeshi Kaikō. After Kaikō won the Akutagawa Prize in 1957 for The Naked King, Daiei Film bought the rights to Giants and Toys. The story was an entry in the "business novel" (経済小説, keizai shōsetsu) genre, which satirizes Japanese workers' devotion to their corporations.

== Reception and legacy ==
In the British Film Institute's list of the best Japanese films from 1925 to the present, reviewer Jasper Sharp describes Giants and Toys as a "deliciously wicked satire on the new cut-throat competitiveness of the postwar corporate world" and a "marker point of modernist cinema".

The film has been shown at the Berkeley Art Museum and Pacific Film Archive in 1979 and 1990, and the Cinémathèque Française in 2007.

== Bibliography ==
- Kaikō, Takeshi (2019). 開高健短篇選 (Takeshi Kaikō Short Story Collection, containing Panic, The Naked King, Giants and Toys a.o.) (in Japanese). Tokyo: Iwanami Shoten. ISBN 978-4003122112.
