= Hitomi Nozoe =

Japanese actress (1937–1995)

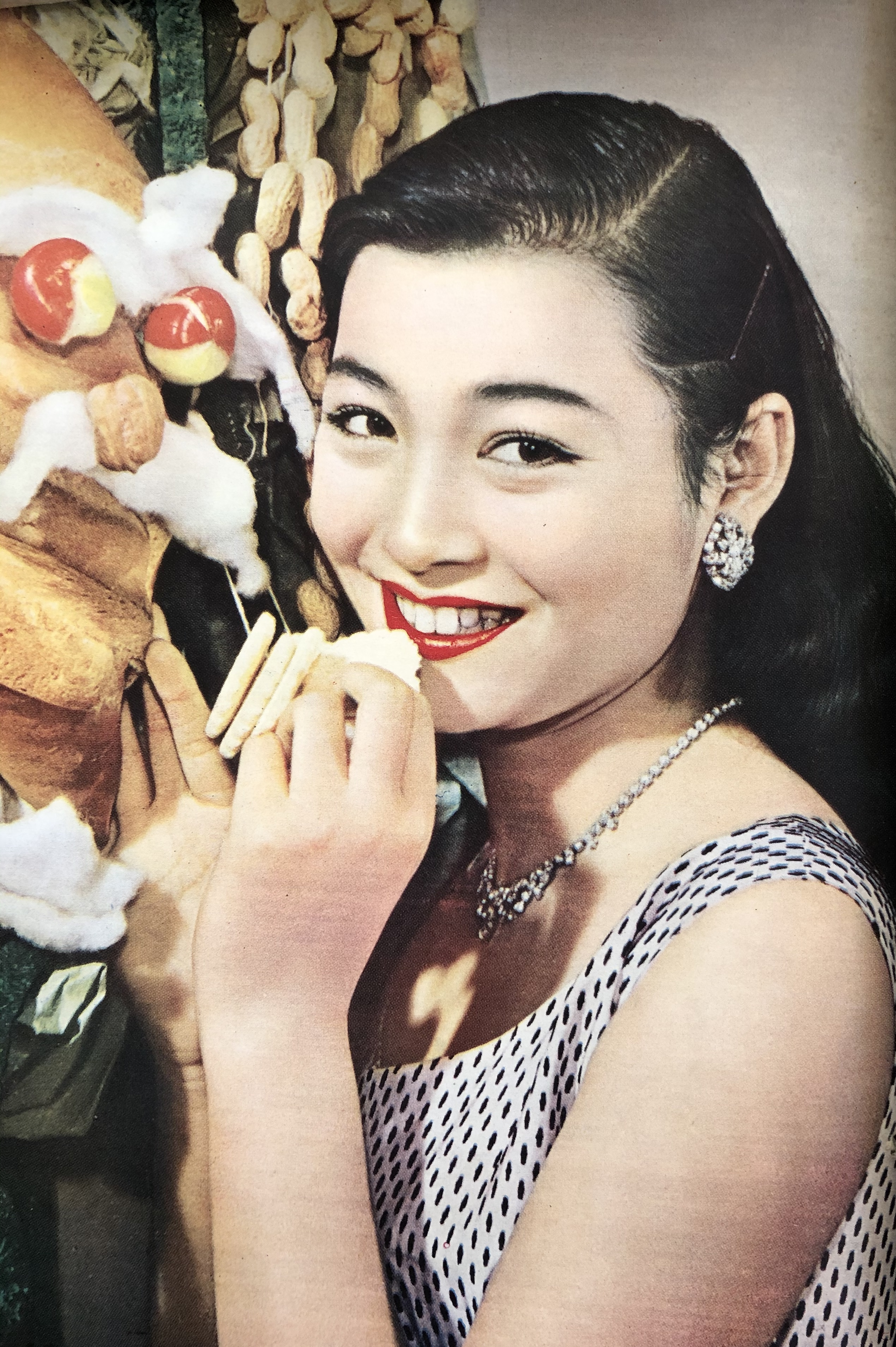
- Hitome Nozoe in the 1950s
- Born: 11 February 1937; Ushigome, Japan
- Died: 4 May 1995 (aged 58); Tokyo, Japan
- Occupation: Actress
- Spouse: Hiroshi Kawaguchi (m. 1960; died 1987)

Hitomi Nozoe (野添ひとみ, Nozoe Hitomi; 11 February 1937 – 4 May 1995) was a Japanese actress popular in the 1950s and early 1960s.

== Career ==
Nozoe first gained attention in ingénue roles for Shochiku in films such as Kobayashi's Sincerity (1953), eventually joining Daiei following her appearance in 1955's national "New Faces" studio recruitment drive. In 1960 she married frequent co-star Hiroshi Kawaguchi, son of writer and Daiei executive Matsutarō Kawaguchi, and both semi-retired from acting within a few years as Kawaguchi became a businessman and reality-TV adventurer.

Known primarily for demure and innocent roles, Nozoe became a "sensation" following her star-turn in Masumura's Giants and Toys (1958) as a vivacious tomboy transformed into an overnight celebrity as a confectionery spokesmodel. She is also well known in the West for her brief role as a barber's daughter in Ozu's widely acclaimed Floating Weeds (1959), which Roger Ebert named as one of the ten greatest films of all time.

In 1988, the year after Kawaguchi's death at age 51 following a long illness with gastric and esophageal cancer, Nozoe published the memoir Hiroshi-san, I Did My Best (浩さん、がんばったね). She continued to write and lecture on the disease, succumbing to thyroid cancer in 1995 at age 58.

== Selected filmography ==
- Kisses (1957)
- Typhoon Over Nagasaki (1957)
- Giants and Toys (巨人と玩具, Kyojin to gangu) (1958)
- Floating Weeds (浮草, Ukigusa) ( (1959)
