= Kisses (1957 film) =

1957 Japanese film

- Film poster

Japanese name
- Kanji: くちづけ
- Directed by: Yasuzō Masumura
- Written by: Kazuo Funahashi (screenplay); Matsutarō Kawaguchi (novel)
- Produced by: Hidemasa Nagata
- Starring: Hiroshi Kawaguchi; Hitomi Nozoe; Eitarō Ozawa; Sachiko Murase
- Cinematography: Jōji Ohara
- Edited by: Tatsuji Nakashizuka
- Music by: Tetsuo Tsukahara
- Production company: Daiei Film
- Release date: 21 July 1957 (Japan)
- Running time: 74 minutes
- Country: Japan
- Language: Japanese

Kisses (Japanese: くちづけ, Hepburn: Kuchizuke), also titled The Kiss, is a 1957 Japanese drama film directed by Yasuzō Masumura, based on a novel by Matsutarō Kawaguchi. It was Masumura's debut as a director and is regarded as a precursor of the Japanese New Wave.

== Plot ==
Kinichi and Akiko meet at a prison in Tokyo, where their fathers are detained. Taking a liking to each other, they spend the day together, driving around on a borrowed motorcycle. Unable to pay both the bail bond for her father and her mother's hospital bill, Akiko gives in to the persistent courting of Osawa, asking him to loan her the needed money in return.

== Cast ==
- Hiroshi Kawaguchi as Kinichi Miyamoto
- Hitomi Nozoe as Akiko Shirakawa
- Eitarō Ozawa as Daikichi Miyamoto, Kinichi's father
- Aiko Mimasu as Yoshiko Uno, Kinichi's mother
- Sachiko Murase as Kiyoko Shirakawa, Akiko's mother
- Ken Wakamatsu as Osawa
- Kanshō Yoshii as Osawa's father

== Release ==
Kisses was released in Japan on 21 July 1957. It was first shown in New York as part of a Masumura retrospective on 18 April 1997.

In more recent years, it has been shown at film museums such as the Berkeley Art Museum and Pacific Film Archive in 1997, the Cinémathèque Française in 2007, and the Austrian Film Museum in 2008.

== Reception ==
After the film's initial release, critic (and future director) Nagisa Ōshima, admiring it for its mobile camera and amoral plot, noted that "a powerful irresistible force has arrived in Japanese Cinema."
