= The Saga of Tanegashima =

1968 Japanese film by Kazuo Mori

Japanese name
- Directed by: Kazuo Mori
- Screenplay by: Kimiyuki Hasegawa and Etsuko Takano
- Based on: Historical events
- Produced by: Masaichi Nagata
- Starring: Rick Jason; Ayako Wakao; Eijirō Tōno; Shiho Fujimura; Jun Fujimaki; Asao Koike; Ichirô Nakatani; Rokkô Toura; Ryûtarô Gomi; Taketoshi Naitô; Saburô Date; Gen Kimura
- Cinematography: Fujio Morita
- Edited by: Toshio Taniguchi
- Music by: Hikaru Hayashi
- Production company: Daiei Film
- Distributed by: Daiei Film
- Release date: June 18, 1968
- Running time: 109 minutes
- Country: Japan
- Language: Japanese

The Saga of Tanegshima (Japanese: 鉄砲伝来記, Hepburn: Teppō Denraiki) is a 1968 Japanese historical drama film directed by Kazuo Mori and produced by Daiei Film. Set during the Sengoku period, the film dramatizes the arrival of Portuguese firearms on the island of Tanegashima in 1543 and the profound impact the new weapons had on Japanese warfare and society. Blending historical spectacle with character-driven drama, the film depicts the political rivalries, cultural encounters, and technological change surrounding one of the most significant moments in early modern Japanese history.

The story follows local lords, samurai, craftsmen, and foreign traders as they respond to the introduction of the arquebus, a weapon that would transform military strategy across Japan. As competing clans seek advantage, the people of Tanegashima find themselves at the center of a turning point in national history. Noted for its period detail, large-scale battle scenes, and depiction of first contact between Japan and Europe, the film reflects the jidaigeki style of late 1960s Japanese cinema.

== Plot ==
During the turbulent Sengoku period, when rival clans battled for supremacy across Japan, a Portuguese ship is driven ashore on Tanegashima. Lord Tokitaka (Taketoshi Naitô) aids the stranded crew and their captain, Pinto (Rick Jason), in repairing the vessel. In gratitude, Pinto presents the lord with a matchlock musket, the first firearm ever witnessed in Japan. What begins as a gesture of thanks soon becomes the spark for a transformation that will alter the nation’s future.

Determined to master the new weapon, Tokitaka orders his finest swordsmith, Kinbei (Eijirō Tōno), to reproduce the musket and begin domestic production. As Kinbei struggles to unravel the secrets of its design, an unexpected romance develops between Captain Pinto and Kinbei’s daughter, Wakasa (Ayako Wakao). Yet Kinbei cannot bear the thought of losing his daughter to a foreign land. Meanwhile, as firearms spread across the country, ambitious warlords such as Oda Nobunaga recognize their devastating potential, ushering in a new age of warfare and leaving a trail of bloodshed in their wake.

== Cast ==
- Rick Jason as Fernão Mendes Pinto
- Ayako Wakao as Wakasa
- Eijirō Tōno as Kinbei Yaita
- Shiho Fujimura as Otane
- Jun Fujimaki as Oda Nobunaga
- Asao Koike as Matasaburo Tachibanaya
- Ichirô Nakatani as Sakuji
- Rokkô Toura as Wufeng
- Ryûtarô Gomi as Tokitada Oribenojô
- Taketoshi Naitô as Tanegashima Tokitaka
- Saburô Date as Tokunoshin Wakita
- Gen Kimura as Tokuzô

== See also ==
- Cinema of Japan
