= Eitaro Ozawa =

Japanese actor (1909–1988)

Eitarō Ozawa
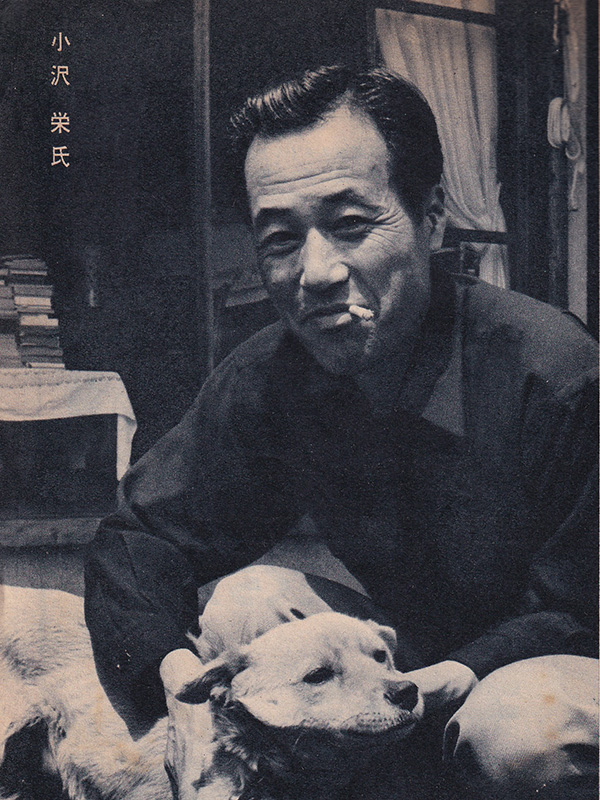
- Ozawa in 1956
- Born: 27 March 1909; Minato, Tokyo, Japan
- Died: 23 April 1988 (aged 79)
- Other name: Sakae Ozawa
- Occupations: Actor, director
- Years active: 1930–1988

Eitarō Ozawa (小沢 栄太郎, Ozawa Eitarō; 27 March 1909 – 23 April 1988), also credited as Sakae Ozawa (小沢栄), was a Japanese film actor and stage actor and director. He appeared in more than 200 films between 1935 and 1988, directed by notable filmmakers such as Kenji Mizoguchi, Mikio Naruse, Keisuke Kinoshita and Kaneto Shindō.

== Biography ==
After leaving high school prematurely, Ozawa started acting in the left-wing theatre groups Toho Sayoku Gekijo and Shinkyo Gekidan. He gave his film debut at the P.C.L. film studio (later Toho) in 1935. In 1940, the authorities ordered the dissolution of the Shinkyo Gekidan and arrested many of its members, including Ozawa, who was forced to change his stage name Sakae to his real name Eitarō. After his release, he joined the Shochiku studio and starred in films by Tomu Uchida, Tomotaka Tasaka and Keisuke Kinoshita. In 1944, he co-founded the Haiyuza theatre group, but was drafted in the same year. After the war, he returned to the Haiyuza and started appearing in films again such as Yasujirō Ozu's Record of a Tenement Gentleman (1947), Akira Kurosawa's Scandal (1950) and Mizoguchi's Ugetsu (1953) and The Crucified Lovers (1954). For a few years, he took his former stage name Sakae again, before ultimately returning to Eitarō.

In addition to acting, Ozawa was active as a director of stage plays, including Bertolt Brecht's The Good Person of Szechwan which he had seen performed in Berlin, and as a writer.

== Filmography (selected) ==
=== Films ===
- Port of Flowers (1943)
- Morning for the Osone Family (1946)
- Marriage (1947)
- Record of a Tenement Gentleman (1947)
- Woman (1948)
- Apostasy (1948)
- The Love of Sumako the Actress (1949)
- Flame of My Love (1949)
- Lady from Hell (1949) as Fujimura
- Scandal (1950)
- Lightning (1952)
- Ugetsu (1953)
- The Thick Walled Room (1953, released 1956)
- The Crucified Lovers (1954)
- Princess Yang Kwei-Fei (1955)
- Wolf (1955)
- A Girl Isn't Allowed to Love (1955)
- An Actress (1956)
- River of the Night (1956)
- Suzakumon (1957)
- Kisses (1957)
- The H-Man (1958)
- The Loyal 47 Ronin (1958)
- Tsukihime keizu (1958)
- The Human Condition I: No Greater Love (1959)
- Ballad of the Cart (1959)
- Lucky Dragon No. 5 (1959)
- When a Woman Ascends the Stairs (1960)
- Scar Yosaburo (1960)
- Go to Hell, Hoodlums! (1960)
- The Demon of Mount Oe (1960)
- Kurenai no Kenju (1961)
- The Mad Fox (1962)
- Gorath (1962)
- Assassination (1964)
- Our Blood Will Not Forgive (1964)
- Akuto (1965)
- Shiroi Kyotō (1966) as Professor Ugai
- Zatoichi Challenged (1967)
- Black Rose Mansion (1969)
- The Ceremony (1971)
- Long Journey into Love (1973)
- Sandakan No. 8 (1974)
- Kenji Mizoguchi: The Life of a Film Director (1975)
- New Battles Without Honor and Humanity: Last Days of the Boss (1976)
- Shōsetsu Yoshida gakkō (1983) as Tsuruhei Matsuno
- Imperial Navy (1981) as Osami Nagano
- Lost in the Wilderness (1986)
- Shinran: Path to Purity (1987)
- A Taxing Woman (1987)

=== Television ===
- Shin Heike Monogatari (1972) as Shinzei
- Genroku Taiheiki (1975) as Kira Yoshinaka
- Castle of Sand (1977)
- Shiroi Kyotō (1978) as Professor Ugai
- Hissatsu Karakurinin Fugakuhiyakkei Koroshitabi (1978)
- Akō Rōshi (1979) as Kira Yoshinaka
- Shadow Warriors III (1982) as Tokugawa Mitsusada
- Ōoku (1983) as Tokugawa Mitsukuni

== Awards and honours (selected) ==
- 1946: Mainichi Film Award for Morning for the Osone Family
- 1984: Kinokuniya Theatre Award
- 1988: Order of the Rising Sun, 4th Class, Gold Rays with Rosette
