= Afraid to Die =

1960 film directed by Yasuzo Masumura

- Directed by: Yasuzo Masumura
- Written by: Hideo Ando; Ryūzō Kikushima
- Produced by: Masaichi Nagata; Hiroaki Fujii (planner)
- Starring: Yukio Mishima; Ayako Wakao; Keizo Kawasaki
- Cinematography: Hiroshi Murai
- Edited by: Tatsuji Nakashizu
- Music by: Tetsuo Tsukahara
- Distributed by: Daiei Film; Fantoma
- Release date: 23 March 1960
- Running time: 96 minutes
- Country: Japan
- Language: Japanese

Afraid to Die (からっ風野郎, Karakkaze yarō, Dry-wind Bastard) is a 1960 Japanese yakuza film directed by Yasuzo Masumura and starring Yukio Mishima. It was written by Hideo Ando and Ryūzō Kikushima.

== Cast ==
- Yukio Mishima as Takeo Asahina
- Ayako Wakao as Yoshie Koizumi
- Keizo Kawasaki as Shoichi Koizumi
- Eiji Funakoshi as Susumu Aikawa
- Takashi Shimura as Gohei Hirayama
- Yaeko Mizutani as Masako Katori
- Michiko Ono as Ayako Takatsu

== Theme song ==
"Karakkaze Yarō" (released by King Records on March 20, 1960, in Japan)

Lyrics and vocals: Yukio Mishima
Music and guitar: Shichirō Fukazawa
Arrangement: Koji Eguchi

The soundtrack is now on CD.
