= Matsutarō Kawaguchi =

Japanese writer (1899–1985)

Matsutarō Kawaguchi 川口 松太郎
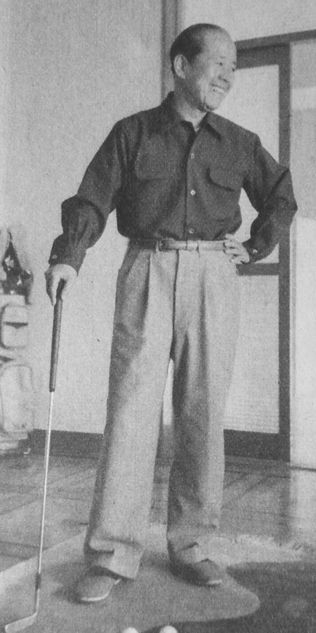
- Born: 1 October 1899; Tokyo, Japan
- Died: 9 June 1985 (aged 85); Tokyo, Japan
- Occupations: Writer, screenwriter

Matsutarō Kawaguchi (川口松太郎, Kawaguchi Matsutarō; 1 October 1899 – 9 June 1985) was a Japanese writer of short stories, novels, dramas and screenplays. He repeatedly collaborated on films of director Kenji Mizoguchi, and his books were adapted by directors such as Mikio Naruse and Kōzaburō Yoshimura.

== Biography ==
Kawaguchi was born in the Asakusa district of Tokyo. He worked in a variety of jobs and studied under Mantarō Kubota and Kaoru Osanai. In 1935, he received the first Naoki Prize for his short stories Tsuruhachi Tsurujirō and Fūryū fukagawa uta and the novella Meiji ichidai onna. The novel Aizen katsura, a melodramatic love story between a nurse and a doctor, was serialised between 1937 and 1938 and made into highly popular film starring Kinuyo Tanaka and Ken Uehara. During the Second Sino-Japanese War, Kawaguchi became a member of the Pen butai ("Pen brigade"), a government-sponsored group of writers who had access to off-limits war areas and were in return expected to write favourably of Japan's war efforts in China. In 1940, Kawaguchi joined the theatre group Shinsei Shinpa, where he wrote plays and directed.

Starting in the 1930s, Kawaguchi adapted other writers' works for films of director Kenji Mizoguchi such as The Story of the Last Chrysanthemums (1939). Mizoguchi in return adapted works by Kawaguchi, such as Ayen kyo for The Straits of Love and Hate (1937). After the war, the two collaborated on the films Ugetsu (1953), The Crucified Lovers (1954) and Princess Yang Kwei Fei (1955), and Mizoguchi again adapted a story by Kawaguchi for his 1953 film A Geisha.

Kawaguchi was long associated with Daiei Film, where he served as managing director. In 1965, he became a member of the Japan Academy of the Arts. He received the Yoshikawa Eiji Prize for his novel Shigurejaya Oriku about the owner of a famous Tokyo teahouse. The book was eventually translated into English by Royall Tyler.

Kawaguchi was awarded the Order of Culture by the Japanese government in 1973. His wife was actress Aiko Mimasu, and his son was actor Hiroshi Kawaguchi.

== Selected works ==
=== Novels and short stories ===
- 1934: Tsuruhachi Tsurujirō
- 1935: Fūryū fukagawa uta
- 1935: Meiji ichidai onna
- 1937–38: Aizen katsura
- 1965: Nyonin musashi
- 1969: Mistress Oriku: Stories from a Tokyo Teahouse

=== Screenplays ===
- 1939: The Story of the Last Chrysanthemums
- 1953: Ugetsu
- 1954: The Crucified Lovers
- 1955: Princess Yang Kwei Fei

=== Adaptations of his work ===
- 1937: The Straits of Love and Hate
- 1938: Tsuruhachi and Tsurujiro
- 1938: Aizen katsura
- 1953: A Geisha
- 1957: Night Butterfly
- 1957: Kisses

== Bibliography ==
- Kawaguchi, Matsutarō (2007). Mistress Oriku: Stories from a Tokyo Teahouse. Translated by Tyler, Royall. Tuttle Publishing.
- Wakashiro, Kiiko (1988). Sora yori no koe: Watakushi no Kawaguchi Matsutaro. Bungei Shunju.
