= Street of Shame =

1956 film by Kenji Mizoguchi

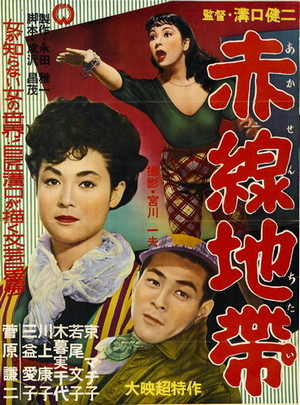
- Theatrical release poster
- Directed by: Kenji Mizoguchi
- Written by: Masashige Narusawa (writer); Yoshiko Shibaki (novel)
- Produced by: Masaichi Nagata
- Starring: Machiko Kyō; Ayako Wakao; Aiko Mimasu; Michiyo Kogure; Hiroko Machida
- Cinematography: Kazuo Miyagawa
- Edited by: Kanji Sugawara
- Music by: Toshiro Mayuzumi
- Production company: Daiei Film
- Distributed by: Daiei Film
- Release date: 18 March 1956 (Japan)
- Running time: 86 minutes
- Country: Japan
- Language: Japanese

Street of Shame (赤線地帯, Akasen chitai; lit. "Red-light district") is a 1956 Japanese drama film and the last film directed by Kenji Mizoguchi. The story, which revolves around a group of women of different backgrounds who work together in a brothel in Tokyo, is based on the novel Susaki no onna by Yoshiko Shibaki.

== Plot ==
Street of Shame revolves around the lives of five female prostitutes working at Dreamland, a licensed brothel owned by the Tayas in a red-light district in Tokyo's Yoshiwara district, while the Diet reconsiders a ban on prostitution.

Yasumi is a young woman trying to bail her father out of jail for corruption. Her long-term client, Mr. Aoki, a married man and a modest businessman, agrees to pay off all of her debts in the belief that she will elope with him, going so far as to embezzle money. When Aoki confronts Yasumi and discovers that she had deceived him into thinking she would marry him, his disillusionment leads to a tussle where he nearly kills her.

Mickey is a vivacious young woman with Western tendencies who spends money without care. When her father arrives from Kobe with news of her mother's death and attempts to persuade her to quit her job for the sake of the family, she castigates him for his hedonism when her mother was alive and throws him out.

Hanae is a woman struggling to provide for her husband (who has suicidal tendencies) and infant. Ultimately, they are evicted by their landlord.

Yorie is an elderly woman with a man she wants to marry but cannot because she owes the Tayas a significant amount of money. When the courts decide that the debts Yorie owes to the Tayas are null and void, she leaves Dreamland to marry the man, but soon returns after being deceived because the man only wanted to exploit her for cheap labor.

Yumeko is an elderly widow trying to raise her son, who is currently working in Tokyo, but avoids meeting him out of embarrassment. When they meet, her son decries her for her profession and disowns her. Yumeko goes insane and is taken away.

Ultimately, the anti-prostitution bill fails to pass. Yasumi recovers and buys the fabric and futon business next door to the brothel, which becomes her first customer. The film ends with the brothel's young maid Shizuko debuting as a prostitute, beckoning men to enter the brothel.

== Cast ==
- Machiko Kyō as Mickey (Michiko)
- Ayako Wakao as Yasumi
- Aiko Mimasu as Yumeko
- Michiyo Kogure as Hanae
- Kumeko Urabe as Otane
- Yasuko Kawakami as Shizuko
- Hiroko Machida as Yorie
- Eitarō Shindō as Kurazō Taya
- Sadako Sawamura as Tatsuko Taya
- Toranosuke Ogawa as Mickey's father
- Bontarō Miyake as nightwatch
- Daisuke Katō as president of Brothel Owners' Association
- Kenji Sahara

== Production ==
The production designer on the film was Hiroshi Mizutani.

== Legacy ==
In July 2018, Street of Shame was selected to be screened in the Venice Classics section at the 75th Venice International Film Festival.
