= Princess Yang Kwei Fei =

1955 Japanese-Hong Kong film by Kenji Mizoguchi

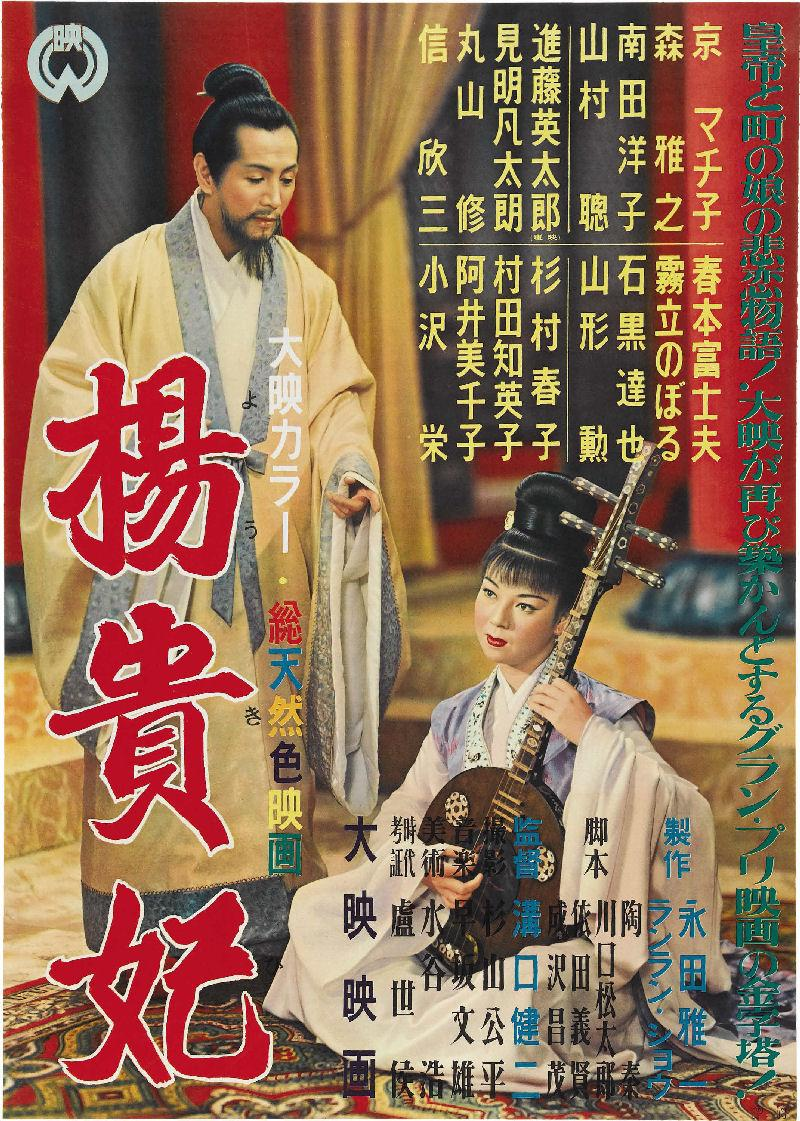
- Theatrical release poster
- Directed by: Kenji Mizoguchi
- Written by: Ching Doe; Matsutaro Kawaguchi; Yoshikata Yoda; Masashige Narusawa
- Produced by: Masaichi Nagata; Run Run Shaw
- Starring: Machiko Kyō; Masayuki Mori; Sō Yamamura; Eitarō Ozawa
- Cinematography: Kohei Sugiyama
- Edited by: Kanji Suganuma
- Music by: Fumio Hayasaka
- Production companies: Daiei Film; Shaw & Sons
- Distributed by: Daiei Film (Japan); Shaw & Sons (Hong Kong, and Macau)
- Release date: 3 May 1955 (Japan)
- Running time: 98 minutes
- Countries: Japan; Hong Kong
- Language: Japanese

Princess Yang Kwei Fei (Japanese: 楊貴妃, Hepburn: Yōkihi (Note: Japanese for Yang Guifei)) is a 1955 historical film directed by Kenji Mizoguchi. It was a co-production between Japan's Daiei Film and Hong Kong's Shaw & Sons (later Shaw Brothers). It is one of Mizoguchi's two colour films, the other being Tales of the Taira Clan, made the same year.

== Plot ==
Emperor Xuanzong of Tang, retired from the throne of the Tang dynasty, gazes at a statue of the woman he loved who has died. He sadly reminisces about their relationship.

In flashback, recently widowed, a depressed Xuanzong is uninterested in governing or affairs of state. He spends his days playing his lute, composing music, and enjoying life's pleasures. His ministers have tried unsuccessfully to interest him in the most beautiful women in the kingdom without success. They hope that a new concubine will help him to get over his depression over the late empress.

The Yang family offers their daughter to the emperor who barely notices her. General An Lushan happens upon a serving girl Yuahan Kwei-Fei/Yang Guifei in the kitchen who he realizes is a great beauty who resembles the late empress. When he finds out she is a relative of the Yang family, he intrigues with the Yangs to dress her in fine robes and present her to the emperor. Instead of a new concubine, Lushan imagines that she will become a new empress. Both he and Kwei-Fei's family plan to use her to gain influence and wealth.

After sending her for training at the same place the former empress had studied, Kwei-Fei finally meets the emperor who notices her resemblance to his late wife and asks her to leave. She plays a song on the lute that the emperor had written and this impresses him. They begin spending time together and she quickly gains his favor.

As time passes, the emperor promotes members of the Yang family to ministerial positions. The emperor's reign has been marked by very high taxes and noticeable corruption. When the Yang family begins openly living decadently and corrupt officials such as Kwei-Fei's cousin Yang Guozhong begin lining their pockets at the empire's expense, the people protest and call for death to the Yang family.

An Lushan visits Kwei Fei asking her to help him obtain a government position. By now, Kwei-Fei is considered an official consort of the emperor. She refuses. When Kwei-Fei discovers the people's unhappiness with her family, she pleads with the emperor to strip her family of their government positions and allow her to go back to her former life. She feels this is the only way to protect him and the people of the empire. He brushes off her concerns and reminds her that the punishment for imperial concubines interfering in matters of state is death. Angry and hurt that she wishes to leave him, Xuanzong banishes Kwei-Fei to his harem with other out-of- favor concubines. Kwei-Fei returns home instead.

Meanwhile General Lushan, still angry that he was unable to procure a government post and disgusted at the corruption of Yang Guozhong, leads a revolution against the emperor. He rallies his troops with calls to destroy the Yang family, and plans to usurp the throne. Calling himself Emperor Taien, he marches on the capital at Chang'an.

When she hears of Lushan's plans, Kwei-Fei rushes to Emperor Xuanzong's side so they can face their fate together. They flee the capital and wind up in a remote village. They spend the evening reminiscing about their first meeting. The Imperial Guards kill Kwei-Fei's sisters and Yang Guozhong who they blame for the rebellion.

Emperor Xuanzhong is told that the people are still loyal to him, but only if he authorizes Kwei-Fei's death. After trying to change their minds, he finally authorizes her death. Kwei-Fei is hanged by the Imperial Guard.

The rebellion is crushed, but the emperor is unable to return because his son had already usurped the throne. He dies a lonely, broken man dreaming of Kwei-Fei and staring at her statue. He welcomes death as a way to return to his true love.

== Cast ==
- Machiko Kyō as Princess Yang Kwei Fei
- Masayuki Mori as Emperor Xuan Zong
- Sō Yamamura as An Lushan
- Eitarō Ozawa as Yang Kuo-chung
- Isao Yamagata as Yang Hsien
- Yōko Minamida as Hung-tao
- Noboru Kiritachi as Cuihua
- Chieko Murata as Lu-hua
- Michiko Ai as Honghua
- Eitarō Shindō as Kao Li-hsi
- Tatsuya Ishiguro as Li Lin-fu
- Bontarō Miake as Chen-Hsuan-li
- Haruko Sugimura as Princess Yen-chun
- Osamu Maruyama as Li Kuei-nien
- Sachiko Murase as Chengfei
- Kinzō Shin as chamberlain

== Legacy ==
The Hong Kong co-producers, by then known under the name Shaw Brothers, remade the film in 1962 as The Magnificent Concubine.
