= The Hoodlum Soldier =

- DVD cover
- Directed by: Yasuzo Masumura
- Written by: Yoriyoshi Arima; Ryūzō Kikushima
- Produced by: Masaichi Nagata
- Starring: Shintaro Katsu; Takahiro Tamura; Eiko Taki; Keiko Awaji; Mikio Narita
- Cinematography: Setsuo Kobayashi
- Edited by: Tatsuji Nakashizu
- Music by: Naozumi Yamamoto
- Distributed by: Daiei Studio
- Release date: 1965
- Running time: 105 minutes
- Country: Japan
- Language: Japanese

The Hoodlum Soldier (Japanese: 兵隊やくざ, Hepburn: Heitai Yakuza) is a Japanese film directed by Yasuzo Masumura. The Hoodlum Soldier was the first of a series of nine films that followed two soldiers, Kisaburo Omiya (Shintaro Katsu), a former yakuza who has become a soldier, and Arita (Takahiro Tamura), an intellectual from a good family who has deliberately failed the officer examination.

== Cast ==
- Shintaro Katsu
- Takahiro Tamura
- Eiko Taki
- Keiko Awaji
- Mikio Narita

== Plot ==
The story is presented as a voiced-over narrative by Arita, speaking long after the events of the film. In a remote army base in Manchuria, near the Soviet border, long-serving corporal Arita hates the military and looks forward to the day he may leave. Although a university graduate, he has several times deliberately failed the exam for promotion and thus remains a corporal after four years' service.

The base commander asks him to take charge of Omiya, a soldier who responds poorly to military discipline. Discipline at the camp is imposed through beatings, with non-commissioned officers being able to freely punch and kick the lower ranks for infractions and failings. Former yakuza member Omiya proves to be very much tougher than the other soldiers and often responds to the beatings with violence. Arita tries to obtain fair treatment for him, for example refusing to let him be beaten with a wooden bar. Omiya forces his way into a brothel for officers and befriends a prostitute there.

Arita becomes friends with Omiya and helps him survive a training forced march, in which Omiya's feet become covered with sores. After another infraction, Arita is ordered to beat Omiya. He hits him once with a shinai, but cannot bring himself to hit Omiya more. To save Arita from being disciplined, Omiya hits himself in the face with bricks, drawing blood. After a soldier is beaten by the catering soldiers, and then escapes from the camp and commits suicide, Omiya picks a fight with the catering soldiers. They trick him by pretending to befriend him then attack him in a secluded part of the camp. Arita rescues Omiya.

Omiya is to be sent to the front on a suicide mission to fight the Soviets. Arita and Omiya steal officers' uniforms and pistols with the help of the prostitute. They make an escape by decoupling the engine of the train they are travelling on. The film ends with them speeding away. In the voice-over, Arita says that every man on the train was killed in battle.

== Release and availability ==
A subtitled version of The Hoodlum Soldier was released in the United States by Altura Films International. It is not currently available on video in the US.

== Reception ==
Film critic Tom Mes opines: "In Hoodlum Soldier army life becomes a miniature of version [sic] Japan itself. Men's lives are lived in daily repetition, lives in which duty and loyalty to the group mean everything, and hierarchy is an omnipotent force."

== Series ==
The films in the "Heitai Yakuza" series are:

- The Hoodlum Soldier (兵隊やくざ, Heitai Yakuza) (1965) Directed by Yasuzo Masumura
- Hoodlum Soldier and the C.O. (続・兵隊やくざ, Zoku Heitai Yakuza) (1965) Directed by Tokuzō Tanaka
- Hoodlum Soldier Deserts Again (新・兵隊やくざ, Shin Heitai Yakuza) (1966) Directed by Tokuzō Tanaka
- Heitai Yakuza Datsugoku (兵隊やくざ 脱獄) (1966) Directed by Kazuo Mori
- Heitai Yakuza Daidassō (兵隊やくざ 大脱走) (1966) Directed by Tokuzō Tanaka
- Heitai Yakuza Ore ni Makasero (兵隊やくざ 俺にまかせろ) (1967) Directed by Tokuzō Tanaka
- Hoodlum Soldier on the Attack (兵隊やくざ 殴り込み, Heitai Yakuza Nagurikomi) (1967) Directed by Tokuzō Tanaka
- Heitai Yakuza Gōdatsu (兵隊やくざ 強奪) (1968) Directed by Tokuzō Tanaka
- Shin Heitai Yakuza Kasen (新兵隊やくざ 火線) (1972) Directed by Yasuzo Masumura
