= Yasuzō Masumura =

Japanese film director (1924–1986)

- Born: 25 August 1924; Kōfu, Yamanashi, Japan
- Died: 23 November 1986 (aged 62); Tokyo, Japan
- Occupations: Film director, screenwriter

Yasuzō Masumura (増村 保造, Masumura Yasuzō; 25 August 1924 – 23 November 1986) was a Japanese film director.

== Biography ==
Masumura was born in Kōfu, Yamanashi. After graduating from the law department at the University of Tokyo, he worked as an assistant director at the Daiei Film studio. He later returned to university to study philosophy and graduated in 1951. The following year, he won a scholarship allowing him to study film in Italy at the Centro Sperimentale di Cinematografia under Michelangelo Antonioni, Federico Fellini and Luchino Visconti.

Masumura returned to Japan in 1953. From 1955, he worked as a second-unit director on films directed by Kenji Mizoguchi, Kon Ichikawa and Daisuke Ito. In 1957, he directed his own first film Kisses, which caused film critic (and future director) Nagisa Ōshima to note, "a powerful irresistible force has arrived in Japanese Cinema." Over the next three decades, he directed 58 films in a variety of genres.

== Legacy ==
According to film critic Shigehiko Hasumi, filmmaker Shinji Aoyama had declared Masumura "the most important filmmaker in the history of postwar Japanese cinema."

== Filmography ==
Title	Year	Credited as		
Title	Year	Director	Screenwriter	Assistant director
Princess Yang Kwei Fei	1955			Yes
Street of Shame	1956			Yes
Punishment Room	1956			Yes
Nihonbashi	1956			Yes
The Crowded Streetcar	1957			Yes
Kisses	1957	Yes		
The Blue Sky Maiden	1957	Yes		
Warm Current	1957	Yes		
The Precipice	1958	Yes		
Giants and Toys	1958	Yes		
The Lowest Man	1958	Yes		
Disobedience	1958	Yes		
The Most Valuable Wife	1959	Yes		
The Cast-Off	1959	Yes		
Beauty the Enemy	1959	Yes		
Across the Darkness	1959	Yes		
A Woman's Testament (first segment)	1960	Yes		
Afraid to Die	1960	Yes		
The Woman Who Touched the Legs	1960	Yes		
A False Student	1960	Yes		
Love and Life	1961	Yes		
A Lustful Man	1961	Yes		
A Wife Confesses	1961	Yes		
The Burdened Sisters	1961	Yes		
Stolen Pleasure	1962	Yes		
Black Test Car	1962	Yes		
A Woman's Life	1962	Yes		
The Black Report	1963	Yes		
When Women Lie	1963	Yes		
Sentimental Mobsters	1963	Yes		
Modern Fraud Story: Cheat	1964	Yes		
With My Husband's Consent	1964	Yes		
Seventeen-year-old Wolf	1964		Yes	
Manji	1964	Yes		
Super-Express	1964	Yes		
Hoodlum Soldier	1965	Yes		
Seisaku's Wife	1965	Yes		
Irezumi	1966	Yes		
Nakano Spy School	1966	Yes		
Red Angel (Movie)	1966	Yes		
Two Wives	1967	Yes		
A Certain Killer	1967		Yes	
Just for You	1967		Yes	
A Fool's Love	1967	Yes		
The Wife of Seishu Hanaoka	1967	Yes		
Evil Trio	1968	Yes		
The Sex Check	1968	Yes		
The House of Wooden Blocks	1968	Yes		
One Day at Summer's End	1968	Yes		
Blind Beast	1969	Yes		
A Thousand Cranes	1969	Yes		
Vixen	1969	Yes		
Electric Jellyfish	1970	Yes		
Ode to the Yakuza	1970	Yes		
The Hot Little Girl	1970	Yes		
Games	1971	Yes		
New Hoodlum Soldier Story: Firing Line	1972	Yes		
Music	1972	Yes		
Hanzo the Razor:The Snare	1973	Yes		
Hanzo the Razor: Who's Got the Gold?	1974		Yes	
Akumyo: Notorious Dragon	1974	Yes		
Mainline to Terror	1975	Yes		
Lullaby of the Earth	1976	Yes		
The Love Suicides at Sonezaki	1978	Yes		
The Garden of Eden	1980	Yes		
For My Daughter's 7th Birthday	1982	Yes		
