= A Girl Isn't Allowed to Love =

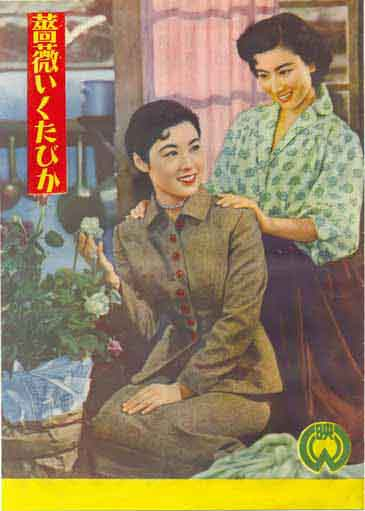
- Japanese movie poster
- Directed by: Teinosuke Kinugasa
- Written by: Teinosuke Kinugasa; Jun Sagara
- Starring: Kazuo Hasegawa; Ayako Wakao; Hideo Takamatsu; Raizo Ichikawa
- Production company: Daiei Film
- Release date: 24 April 1955 (Japan)
- Running time: 135 minutes
- Country: Japan
- Language: Japanese

A Girl Isn't Allowed to Love (Japanese: 薔薇いくたびか, Hepburn: Bara ikutabika), also known as The Rose Again, is a 1955 Japanese film directed by Teinosuke Kinugasa.

== Cast ==
- Kazuo Hasegawa
- Ayako Wakao
- Hideo Takamatsu as Engineer
- Raizo Ichikawa as Sofu Yamamura
