= List of Daiei Films =

This is a list of films produced by Daiei Film. Daiei was established in 1942 under its original title of the Greater Japan Motion Picture Production Company (Dai Nihon Eiga Seisaku Kabukishikigaisha). The company's early output consisted primarily of war propaganda films. The company began submitting its films to overseas festivals in the early 1950s with titles such as Akira Kurosawa's Rashomon, Kenji Mizoguchi's Ugetsu and Teinosuke Kinugasa's Gate of Hell, which all won awards internationally. Other productions during the 1950s and 1960s included their horror (ghost) films and the long-running Zatoichi series starring Katsu Shintaro. The company also created kaiju eiga during this period to rival the popular Toho Godzilla series with Gamera and Daimajin.

Towards the late 1960s, Daiei was suffering from severe financial difficulties and merged with Nikkatsu temporarily in June 1970 until Nikkatsu withdrew in August 1971. By 1974, Daiei was being run as a rental studio, as it was assimilated as a subsidiary of Tokuma Shoten Publishing Company. Daiei continued on with reduced production during this period. In the 1990s, few films from Daiei reached overseas markets; these included Shall We Dance? and a new Gamera trilogy. In 2002, Kadokawa Shoten acquired Daiei's back catalog and renamed the company Kadokawa-Daiei Motion Picture Company. In 2004, it dropped the name Daiei and is now simply known as Kadokawa Pictures.

== Films ==
This list compiles the films by their original release date, their common English titles and Japanese titles. The Japanese titles are not necessarily direct translations of their English counterparts.

Release date	English release title	Original Japanese title	Notes	Ref(s)
March 13, 1949	The Quiet Duel	Shizukanaru Kettō		
September 26, 1949	The Invisible Man Appears	Tōmei Ningen Arawaru		
August 25, 1950	Rashomon	Rashōmon		
March 5, 1952	Avalanche	Nadare		
October 9, 1952	Lightning	Inazuma		
October 23, 1952	Girls Hand in Hand	Futari no hitomi		
1952	Tragic Ghost Story of Fukagawa	Kaidan Fukagawa jowa		
March 26, 1953	Ugetsu	Ugetsu monogatari		
August 12, 1953	A Geisha	Gion Bayashi		
August 19, 1953	Older Brother, Younger Sister	Ani imōto		
September 3, 1953	Ghost of Saga Mansion	Kaidan Saga yashiki		
October 31, 1953	Gate of Hell	Jigokumon		
December 29, 1953	Ghost-Cat of Arima Palace	Kaibyō Arima goten		
1954	Terrible Ghost-Cat of Okazaki	Kaibyo Okazaki sodo		
1954	Ghost-Cat of Oma-ga-tsuji	Kaibyo Oma-ga-tsuji		
March 31, 1954	Sansho the Bailiff	Sanshō Dayū		
June 20, 1954	The Woman in the Rumor	Uwasa no Onna		
August 25, 1954	The Great White Tiger Platoon	Hana no Byakkotai		
September 29, 1954	Zenigata Heiji: Ghost Lord	Zenigata Heiji Torimono no Hikae: Yūrei Daimyō		
October 20, 1954	The Princess Sen	Sen-hime		
November 23, 1958	The Crucified Lovers	Chikamatsu Monogatari		
December 22, 1954	The Young Swordsman	Shiode Kushima Binan Kenpō		
January 29, 1955	The Second Son	Jinanbō Garasu		
March 25, 1955	The Magistrate	Jinanbō Hangan		
April 19, 1955	The Young Lord	Onikiri Wakasama		
April 24, 1955	A Girl Isn't Allowed to Love	Bara ikutabika		
May 3, 1955	Princess Yang Kwei Fei	Yōkihi		
June 26, 1955	The Dancer and Two Warriors	Odoriko Gyōjōki		
September 6, 1955	The Magical Warrior	Tsuna Watari Misemono Zamurai		
September 21, 1955	Tales of the Taira Clan	Shin Heike Monogatari		
September 28, 1955	The Romance of Yushima	Onna keizu: Yushima no shiraume		
November 1, 1955	The Iroha Elegy	Iroha Bayashi		
December 7, 1955	Thief and Magistrate	Kaitō to Hangan		
January 3, 1956	Migratory Birds of the Flowers	Hana no Wataridori		
January 9, 1956	Matashirō Fighting Journey	Matashirō Kenka-tabi		
January 29, 1956	Warning from Space	Uchūjin Tōkyō ni arawaru		
April 18, 1956	Night School	Yakan chūgaku		
May 18, 1956	Sisters of the Gion	Gion no kyōdai		
May 25, 1956	Fighting Birds	Kenka Oshidori		
July 27, 1956	Flowery Hood	Hana Zukin		
December 12, 1956	Fighting Fire Fighter	Abare Tobi		
July 19, 1956	Ghost-Cat of Gojusan-Tsugi	Kaibyo Gojusan-tsugi		
August 14, 1956	Zenigata Heiji: Human-skin Spider	Zenigata Heiji Torimono no Hikae: Hitohada Gumo		
September 12, 1956	Night River	Yoru no kawa		
November 7, 1956	Flowery Hood 2	Zoku Hana Zukin		
December 28, 1956	Gonpachi	Amigasa Gonpachi		
March 6, 1957	An Osaka Story	Osaka Monogatari		
August 25, 1957	The Invisible Man vs. The Human Fly	Tōmei Ningen to Hae Otoko		
September 29, 1957	A Fantastic Tale of Naruto	Naruto Hichō		
October 8, 1957	The Blue Sky Maiden	Aozora musume		
October 15, 1957	The Hole	Ana		
December 15, 1957	Freelance Samurai	Momotarō Zamurai		
1957	Ghost Cat of Yonaki Swamp	Kaibyō Yonaki numa		
1957	Return to Manhood	Nanbanji no Semushi-Otoko		
April 1, 1958	The Loyal 47 Ronin	Chūshingura		
June 10, 1958	The 7th Secret Courier for Edo	Nanabanme no Misshi		
June 15, 1958	Ghost-Cat Wall of Hatred	Kaibyo noroi no kabe		
June 22, 1958	Giants and Toys	Kyojin to gangu		
August 19, 1958	Conflagration	Enjō		
November 15, 1958	Ambush at Iga Pass	Iga no suigetsu		
June 23, 1959	Odd Obsession	Kagi		
July 9, 1959	The Ghost of Yotsuya	Yotsuya kaidan		
November 3, 1959	Fires on the Plain	Nobi		
November 17, 1959	Floating Weeds	Ukigusa		
December 27, 1959	Enchanted Princess	Hatsuharu tanuki goten		
January 14, 1960	A Woman's Testament	Jokyō		
March 23, 1960	Afraid to Die	Karakkaze Yarō		
April 27, 1960	The Demon of Mount Oe	Ōeyama Shuten Dōji		
June 26, 1960	Ghost Story: Depth of Kasane	Kaidan Kasanegafuchi		
October 18, 1960	Satan's Sword	Daibosatsu Tōge		
November 1, 1960	Her Brother	Otōto		
July 5, 1961	Ghost Story of Kakui Street	Kaidan Kakuidori		
April 12, 1962	The Tale of Zatoichi	Zatōichi Monogatari		
June 24, 1962	Ghost Story: Crying in the Night Lantern	Kaidan yonaki-doro		
July 7, 1962	Black Test Car	Kuro no shisō-sha		
July 15, 1962	The Whale God	Kujira-gami		
October 12, 1962	The Tale of Zatoichi Continues	Zoku Zatōichi Monogatari		
November 1, 1962	The Great Wall	Shin no shikotei		
November 18, 1962	Being Two Isn't Easy	Watashi wa nisai		
January 13, 1963	An Actor's Revenge	Yukinojo henge		
March 15, 1963	The New Tale of Zatoichi	Shin Zatoichi monogatari		
June 23, 1963	Ghost Story of Devil's Fire Swamp	Kaidan onibi no numa		
August 10, 1963	Zatoichi the Fugitive	Zatoichi kyojotabi		
November 2, 1963	Enter Kyōshirō Nemuri the Swordman	Nemuri Kyōshirō Sappōchō		
November 30, 1963	Zatoichi on the Road	Zatoichi kenkatabi		
March 14, 1964	Zatoichi and the Chest of Gold	Zatoichi senryokubi		
May 23, 1964	The Frolic of the Beasts	Kemono no Tawamure		
July 11, 1964	Zatoichi's Flashing Sword	Zatoichi abaredako		
December 30, 1964	Adventures of Zatoichi	Zatōichi sekisho-yaburi		
March 14, 1965	The Sword	Ken		
April 3, 1965	Zatoichi's Revenge	Zatoichi no uta ga kikoeru		
September 18, 1965	Zatoichi and the Doomed Man	Zatoichi sakata giri		
November 27, 1965	Gamera, the Giant Monster	Daikaiju Gamera		
December 24, 1965	Zatoichi and the Chess Expert	Zatoichi jigokutabi		
April 17, 1966	Gamera vs. Barugon	Daikaijū kettō: Gamera tai Barugon		
April 17, 1966	Daimajin	Daimajin		
May 3, 1966	Zatoichi's Vengeance	Zatoichi nidan giri		
August 13, 1966	Zatoichi's Pilgrimage	Zatoichi umi o wataru		
August 13, 1966	Return of Daimajin	Daimajin ikaru		
December 10, 1966	Daimajin Strikes Again	Daimajin gyakushu		
January 3, 1967	Zatoichi's Cane Sword	Zatoichi tekkatabi		
March 15, 1967	Gamera vs. Gyaos	Daikaiju kuchesen - Gamera tai Gyaosu		
April 29, 1967	A Certain Killer	Aru Koroshiya		
August 12, 1967	Zatoichi the Outlaw	Zatoichi royaburi		
December 30, 1967	Zatoichi Challenged	Zatoichi chikemuri kaido		
March 20, 1968	Gamera vs. Viras	Gamera tai uchu kaiju Bairasu		
March 20, 1968	Yokai Monsters: One Hundred Monsters	Yokai kyaku monogatari		
April 20, 1968	The Snow Woman	Kaidan Yukijorō		
June 15, 1968	The Bride From Hades	Kaidan botandoro		
June 15, 1968	The Ghostly Trap	Kaidan otoshiana		
July 13, 1968	The Yoshiwara Story	Hiroku Onnagura		
August 10, 1968	Zatoichi and the Fugitives	Zatoichi hatashijo		
December 14, 1968	The Snake Girl and the Silver-Haired Witch	Hebimusume to hakuhatsuki		
December 14, 1968	Yokai Monsters: Spook Warfare	Yokai daisenso		
December 28, 1968	Samaritan Zatoichi	Zatoichi kenka daiko		
January 1969	Blind Beast	Mōjū		
March 21, 1969	Yokai Monsters: Along with Ghosts	Tōkaidō Obake Dōchū		
1969	The Haunted Castle	Hiroku kaibyoden		
1969	The Curse of the Ghost	Oiwa no borei		
March 21, 1969	Gamera vs. Guiron	Gamera tai daiakuju Giron		
January 15, 1970	Zatoichi Meets Yojimbo	Zatoichi to Yojimbo		
March 21, 1970	Gamera vs. Jiger	Gamera tai daimaju Jaiga		
March 21, 1970	The Invisible Swordsman	Tomei Kenshi		
June 20, 1970	The Masseur's Curse	Kaidan kasane ga fuchi		
August 12, 1970	Zatoichi Goes to the Fire Festival	Zatoichi abare himatsuri		
January 13, 1971	Zatoichi and the One-Armed Swordsman	Zatoichi "Yabure! Tojin-ken"		
July 17, 1971	Gamera vs. Zigra	Gamera tai shinkai kaiju Jigura		
March 20, 1980	Gamera: Super Monster	Uchu kaiju Gamera		
1982	The Go Masters	Mikan no Taikyoku		
June 25, 1988	The Silk Road	Tonko		
June 9, 1990	Roar of the Crowd	Haruka naru Koshien		
January 15, 1992	Sumo Do, Sumo Don't	Shiko funjatta		
June 27, 1992	Dreams of Russia	O-Roshiya-koku suimu-dan		
April 17, 1993	Madadayo	Madadayo		
March 11, 1995	Gamera: Guardian of the Universe	Gamera - Daikaiju kuchu kessen		
August 26, 1995	Shinjuku Triad Society	Shinjuku kuroshakai - China Mafia Senso		
October 7, 1995	See You at the Campground	Kyanpu de aimasho		
January 27, 1996	Shall We Dance?	Shall We dansu?		
July 13, 1996	Gamera 2: Attack of Legion	Gamera Tsu - Region shurai		
June 28, 1997	Rainy Dog	Gokudo Kuroshaki - Rainy Dog		
1997	Cure	Kyua		
March 3, 1999	Gamera 3: The Revenge of Iris	Gamera Suri - Jyashin Irisu kakuseii		
May 22, 1999	Ley Lines	Nihon Kuroshakai		
November 27, 1999	Dead or Alive	Dead or Alive - Hanzaisha		
November 11, 2000	The City of Lost Souls	Hyoryugai		
December 2, 2000	Dead or Alive 2	Dead or Alive 2 -Tobosha		
February 3, 2001	Pulse	Kairo		
January 12, 2002	Dead or Alive: Final			
June 22, 2002	Graveyard of Honor	Shin Jingi no Hakaba		
August 3, 2002	Shangri-La	Togenkyo no Hitobito - Kinyu Hametsu Nippon		

== See also ==
- Tsuburaya Productions
- Toho
- Daiei Film
- Nikkatsu
- Toei Company
- Shochiku
- Shintoho

== Bibliography ==
- Galbraith IV, Stuart (1994). Japanese Science Fiction, Fantasy and Horror Films. McFarland. ISBN 0-89950-853-7.
- Galbraith IV, Stuart (1996). The Japanese Filmography: 1900 through 1994. McFarland. ISBN 0-7864-0032-3.
- Galbraith IV, Stuart (2008). The Toho Studios Story: A History and Complete Filmography. Scarecrow Press. ISBN 978-1461673743.
- Mes, Tom (2006). Agitator: The Cinema of Takashi Miike. FAB Press. ISBN 1903254418.
- Murguia, Salvador Jimenez, ed. (2016). The Encyclopedia of Japanese Horror Films. Rowman & Littlefield. ISBN 978-1442261679.
- Sharp, Jasper (2011). Historical Dictionary of Japanese Cinema. Scarecrow. ISBN 978-0810875418.
- Lee, Walter W. (1973). Reference Guide to Fantastic Films. Chelsea-Lee Books. ISBN 978-0913974025.
