= Akado Suzunosuke =

Japanese manga series

赤胴鈴之助 (Akadō Suzunosuke)
- Genre: Jidaigeki, swashbuckler
- Manga
- Written by: Eiichi Fukui (Episode 1); Tsunayoshi Takeuchi (Episode 2 onwards)
- Published by: Shōnen Gahōsha
- Magazine: Shōnen Gahō
- Original run: August 1954 – December 1960
- Volumes: 22
- Anime television series
- Directed by: Shigetsugu Yoshida
- Written by: Mon Shichijo; Haruya Yamazaki; Yoshitake Suzuki; Yutaka Kaneko; Tatsuo Tamura
- Music by: Takeo Watanabe (composition); Yūshi Matsuyama (arrangement)
- Studio: Tokyo Movie; A Production
- Original network: Fuji Television
- Original run: April 5, 1972 – March 28, 1973
- Episodes: 52
Further information
Radio drama
Akado Suzunosuke (1957-1959)
Live-action
Suzunosuke Akado (1957); Suzunosuke Akado: The Moonlight Monster (1957); Suzunosuke Akado: Defeat the Demon-Faced Gang (1957); Suzunosuke Akado: The Vacuum Slash of Asuka Style (1957); Suzunosuke Akado: The Demon of the New Moon Tower (1957); Suzunosuke Akado: The One-Legged Demon (1957); Suzunosuke Akado: The Birdman with Three Eyes (1958); Suzunosuke Akado: The Thunderman of the Black Cloud Valley (1958); Suzunosuke Akado: Defeat the Skull Gang (1958)
Television drama
Original network	OTV
Original run	September 20, 1957 – October 3, 1958
Episodes	55
Television drama
Original network	KRT
Original run	October 2, 1957 – March 25, 1959
Episodes	55
- icon

Akado Suzunosuke (赤胴鈴之助, Akadō Suzunosuke) is a Japanese manga series created by Eiichi Fukui and Tsunayoshi Takeuchi. It was serialized from 1954 to 1960.

It is a jidaigeki story featuring a young swordsman who confronts villains. At the time, it was seen as unusually high quality and quickly gained popularity among children. The popularity of the work led to the production of a radio drama in 1957, followed by a film adaptation and two TV drama adaptations in the same year. As its popularity subsided, the manga series ended. An anime adaptation was produced in 1972.

== Plot ==
Akado Suzunosuke tells the story of Suzunosuke Akado, a young boy who aspires to become the best swordsman in Japan. He joins the Chiba Dōjō, (Note: It is modeled after Genbukan, a dōjō founded by the real-life Shūsaku Narimasa Chiba.) run by Shūsaku Chiba, a renowned practitioner of the Hokushin Ittō-ryū in Edo, where he spends his days training and trying to perfect the Akado Vacuum Slash, a special technique left by his father. Suzunosuke faces a variety of events, including a feud and reconciliation with senior disciple Rainoshin Tatsumaki, and a confrontation with the Kimento, which is plotting to overthrow the Edo Shogunate. He faces these hardships undaunted, continuing to follow his own path.

== Production ==
Akado Suzunosuke was created by Eiichi Fukui, a popular manga artist and a contemporary of Osamu Tezuka, who adopted Yowamushi Suzunosuke (よわむし鈴之助, Yowamushi Suzunosuke; lit. 'Suzunosuke the Coward'), a one-shot that he wrote in the past, for serialization. However, following the publication of the first episode in the magazine and the drafting of the second episode, Fukui died. As a result, Tsunayoshi Takeuchi, a newly debuted manga artist, was unexpectedly tasked with continuing the manga. Takeuchi assumed responsibility for the series, writing from the second episode through to its finale.

== Characters ==
Suzunosuke Akado (赤胴 鈴之助, Akadoō Suzunosuke)
A boy who trains at the Hokushin Ittō-ryū Chiba Dōjō to become the best swordsman in Japan. His real name is Suzunosuke Kinno, but he is called Suzunosuke Akadō because he wears an Akadō (red breastplate), a memento of his father.
Shūsaku Chiba (千葉 周作, Chiba Shūsaku)
Founder of Hokushin Ittō-ryū and a master swordsman who established the Chiba Dōjō in Edo. He serves as Suzunosuke's master in the series and is modeled after the historical swordsman of the same name.
Sayuri Chiba (千葉 さゆり, Chiba Sayuri)
Daughter of Shūsaku. She is a skilled swordswoman and good with a naginata.
Osuzu (お鈴, Osuzu)
A woman who makes her living as a tailor. She is Suzunosuke's mother.
Rainoshin Tatsumaki (竜巻 雷之進, Tatsumaki Rainoshin)
A disciple at the Chiba Dōjō with a natural talent for swordsmanship. He was Suzunosuke's senior and rival, but after losing to Suzunosuke, he became desperate, leading to his excommunication.
Oshinosuke Yokoguruma (横車 押之助, Yokoguruma Oshinosuke)
Head instructor of Chiba Dōjō. He is a close friend of Suzunosuke's father.
Gakurinbo (岳林坊, Gakurinbō)
Rainoshin's elder brother. He is a spear user and a dojoyaburi. He later joins the Kimentō, but is s persuaded by Rainoshin to abandon the group.
Matsunosuke Ooki (大木 松之助, Ōki Matsunosuke)
Suzunosuke's friend. He mistakenly identifies Suzunosuke as the murderer of his father and targets him alongside his uncle.
Banyoken Ooki (大木 蛮洋軒, Ōki Banyoken)
Matsunosuke's uncle and a master of kusarigama. He targets Suzunosuke with his nephew to avenge his younger brother's death.
Tetsunosuke Kinno (金野 鉄之助, Kinno Tetsunosuke)
Suzunosuke's late father.
Kimento (鬼面党, Kimen-tō; lit. 'Demon mask group')
An villainous organization that schemes to overthrow the Edo Shogunate and rule the country. All members wear demon masks. They plot to recruit the skilled Suzunosuke and Rainoshin into their ranks.

== Media ==
=== Manga ===
Akado Suzunosuke was serialized in Shōnen Gahō, a monthly shōnen manga magazine published by Shōnen Gahōsha, from the August 1954 issue to the December 1960 issue, and was collected in 22 tankōbon volumes.

It was reprinted in 2007 by Shōnen Gahōsha and Shogakukan. Shonen Gahosha faithfully reprinted the original in every detail, while Shogakukan reprinted it in A5 format, which is slightly larger than the original B6 format, for easier reading.

It was released as an Ebook in 2014 and eBookJapan began distributing it.

=== Anime ===
The anime adaptation was broadcast on Fuji Television Network from April 5, 1972, to March 28, 1973, for a total of 52 episodes. It was co-produced by Fuji Television and Tokyo Movie, (Note: Currently TMS Entertainment.) with the actual production of the animation outsourced to A Production. (Note: Currently Shin-Ei Animation.)

The anime has a total of 52 episodes, utilizing the essence of the original manga while introducing characters who do not appear in the manga and interspersing an anime-original, road movie-like storyline in the middle of the episodes. Each 30-minute episode was produced in just over a month with an animation director and two to four key animators, a pace that would be nearly impossible today.

Many of the staff members were from Mushi Production and Tōei Dōga, (Note: Currently Toei Animation.) giving them a solid foundation, and the quality of the animation is high throughout the 52 episodes. The main staff consists of former Tōei Dōga members: Shigetsugu Yoshida as director, Daikichiro Kusube as animation director, and Yōichi Kotabe as assistant animation director. This group included many animators who would later go on to show their unique talents, such as Yoshinori Kanada and Yoshifumi Kondo. The staff working on the storyboards are all people who have done epoch-making work in Japanese animation, such as Toshio Hirata, Hayao Miyazaki, and Noboru Ishiguro. Among them, the work of Osamu Dezaki, who joined under the name Kuyo Sai, was notable, and he worked on 14 episodes, a quarter of the total.

=== Live-action films ===
Nine film adaptations produced by Daiei Film were released from 1957 to 1958. The lead actor was Shoji Umewaka for the first seven films, and was replaced by Taro Momoyama for the eighth and ninth films.

==== Filmography ====
- Suzunosuke Akado (赤胴鈴之助, Akadō Suzunosuke) (released on May 21, 1957, black-and-white film)
- Suzunosuke Akado: The Moonlight Monster (赤胴鈴之助 月夜の怪人, Akadō Suzunosuke Tsukiyo no Kaijin) (Released on June 18, 1957, black-and-white film)
- Suzunosuke Akado: Defeat the Demon-Faced Gang (赤胴鈴之助 鬼面党退治, Akadō Suzunosuke Kimen-tō Taiji) (Released on August 13, 1957, black and white film)
- Suzunosuke Akado: The Vacuum Slash of Asuka Style (赤胴鈴之助 飛鳥流真空斬り, Akadō Suzunosuke Asuka-ryū Shinkū-giri) (Released on August 25, 1957, black and white film)
- Suzunosuke Akado: The Demon of the New Moon Tower (赤胴鈴之助 新月塔の妖鬼, Akadō Suzunosuke Shingetsu-tō no Yōki) (Released on September 21, 1957, color film)
- Suzunosuke Akado: The One-Legged Demon (赤胴鈴之助 一本足の魔人, Akadō Suzunosuke Ippon-ashi no Majin) (Released on December 28, 1957, color film)
- Suzunosuke Akado: The Birdman with Three Eyes (赤胴鈴之助三つ目の鳥人, Akadō Suzunosuke Mitsume no Chōjin) (Released on March 11, 1958, color film)
- Suzunosuke Akado: The Thunderman of the Black Cloud Valley (赤胴鈴之助黒雲谷の雷人, Akadō Suzunosuke Kokuundani no Raijin) (Released on November 15, 1958, black and white film)
- Suzunosuke Akado: Defeat the Skull Gang (赤胴鈴之助 どくろ団退治, Akadō Suzunosuke Dokuro-dan Taiji) (Released on December 21, 1958, black and white film)

=== Radio drama ===
A radio drama adaptation aired on Radio Tokyo (Note: Currently TBS Radio.) from January 7, 1957, to February 14, 1959, with a total of 42 episodes. The theme song, which would be used in subsequent film, TV dramas, and anime series, was created for the program.

=== Live-action TV drama series ===
Two television drama adaptations were aired in 1957 on separate TV stations using the then-predominant live broadcast format. The Osaka Television Broadcasting (Note: Currently Asahi Television Broadcasting.) version aired a total of 55 episodes from September 20, 1957, to October 3, 1958. The KR TV (Radio Tokyo Television) (Note: Currently TBS Television.) version aired a total of 55 episodes from October 2, 1957, to March 25, 1959.
