= Suzunosuke Akado =

- Japanese theatrical release poster

Japanese name
- Kanji: 孫悟空
- Directed by: Bin Kato
- Screenplay by: Juntaro Hozumi; Shigeo Okamoto; Masanori Matsumura; Tetsuro Yoshioka
- Based on: Akado Suzunosuke by Tsunayoshi Takeuchi
- Produced by: Kazuyoshi Takeda
- Cinematography: Hiroshi Imai
- Edited by: Shigeo Nishida
- Music by: Urato Watanabe
- Release date: May 21, 1957 (Japan)
- Running time: 56 minutes
- Country: Japan
- Language: Japanese

Suzunosuke Akado (Japanese: 赤胴鈴之助, Hepburn: Akadō Suzunosuke) is a 1957 Japanese tokusatsu fantasy drama film directed by Bin Kato and produced by Kazuyoshi Takeda, and is the first of the nine-film series based on the manga Akado Suzunosuke. IMDb credits Shoji Umewaka as "Masaji Umeiwa" the main star of the film.

== Plot ==
Changzhou is Itako Kanno Tetsusai Old man Son Suzunosuke was raised by his grandfather Tetsusai as a brave boy without knowing his parents' faces. He was good at vacuum slashing with his father's red body and eventually became a fine young man. One day, he was excommunicated because he played another style match that Tetsusai had forbidden against two people, Takerinbo and Hikyomono Taiten, who came to break the dojo. However, this had Tetsusai's compassion for letting the cute girl travel. Suzunosuke regretted parting with his childhood friend Shinobu and went to Edo to enter the dojo of Shusaku Chiba, who is in the same class as his late father. I also heard that there is a mother in Edo. At the Chiba Dojo, Suzunosuke was ordered to do chores from morning till night. Shusaku's daughter, Sayuri, sympathized with him, but her brother, Tornado Rainoshin, was willing to hit Suzunosuke. Suzunosuke was attacked by the Tayu gang who aimed at the Shusaku family and bravely responded when he accompanied Sayuri who went to visit Asakusa Kannon instead of Rainoshin, but Rainosuke bent his sword more and more. went. However, on the day of the promotion match, Suzunosuke confronted Rainoshin and won the victory. Rainoshin, who grudges about the defeat, assisted the Monotayu gang. On the other hand, in Itako, Tetsusai died due to the wounds struck by the Tayu. Shinobu visited the Chiba Dojo to inform him of this. Eventually, Suzunosuke received a letter of challenge from Rainoshin to recover his former defeat in a serious game, and went to the promised place, Gokokuji. However, the Monota Tenkaippin was waiting on the way. Suzunosuke, who was cornered, escaped into the tower with Shinobu, who was worried about him. Part 2, Moonlit Night Phantom --- Suzunosuke Toshinobu in the precincts of Gokokuji is just a crisis. However, due to the work of the Chiba Dojo, who suddenly knew it, the crew broke away. Around that time, Tsujigiri appeared on the bank of Yanagihara every night, and the townspeople were suspicious of the disciples of the Chiba Dojo because they were Hokushin Ittou style users. By the way, Suzunosuke's mother, Ofuji, abandoned Tetsunosuke for some reason, but he lived safely in Edo while doing needlework for his internal job at the expense of Shusaku. One day, Suzunosuke went to Ofuji's house to ask for a tailor-made by Shusaku, but when he passed the Yanagihara bank, the black mask suddenly slashed. But this is what Shusaku did to test his skills. And, the real Tsujigiri was staring at this situation from behind. Among them, Suzunosuke received a letter of challenge from Rainoshin again, which he could not fulfil at Gokokuji Temple. Suzunosuke and Rainoshin continued their deadly battle at the promised Gojiin Kehara. However, the gentle words of Shusaku, who came to him, revealed that Rainoshin was also converted now and that Monotayu was a terrifying Tsujigiri. Yukinoshin decided to leave Edo for training, and Suzunosuke also decided to leave to avenge his grandfather's death, Monotayu. Shusaku gave a farewell gift to the two. A knife for Rainoshin and a mother's wisteria for Suzunosuke. After meeting his mother, Suzunosuke set out on a journey of mourning.

== Cast ==
- Tamao Nakamura
- Shoji Umewaka as Akado Suzunosuke

== Home media ==
The film was released on DVD by Victor Film on December 20, 2002.
