= Inazuma Kaidō =

- Japanese movie poster
- Directed by: Kazuo Mori
- Written by: Minoru Inuzuka; Teinosuke Kinugasa
- Produced by: Shozaburo Asai
- Starring: Raizo Ichikawa; Ryūji Shinagawa; Yōko Uraji; Michiko Ai; Yôichi Funaki
- Cinematography: Shozo Honda
- Music by: Seiichi Suzuki
- Distributed by: Daiei Film
- Release date: September 21, 1957 (Japan)
- Running time: 78 minutes
- Country: Japan
- Language: Japanese

Inazuma Kaidō (Japanese: 稲妻街道) is a 1957 Japanese chanbara film directed by Kazuo Mori.

== Cast ==
- Raizo Ichikawa
- Ryūji Shinagawa
- Yōko Uraji
- Michiko Ai
- Yôichi Funaki
- Ichirô Izawa
- Akio Kobori
- Kumeko Urabe
