= Suzunosuke Akado: The Birdman with Three Eyes =

- Theatrical re-release poster
- Directed by: Kazuo Mori
- Screenplay by: Juntaro Hozumi; Shigeo Okamoto; Masanori Matsumura
- Based on: Akado Suzunosuke by Tsunayoshi Takeuchi
- Produced by: Shin Sakai
- Starring: Shoji Umewaka; Tamao Nakamura
- Cinematography: Kazuo Miyagawa
- Edited by: Mitsuzo Miyata
- Music by: Urato Watanabe
- Production company: Daiei Film
- Distributed by: Daiei
- Release date: March 11, 1958 (Japan)
- Running time: 71 minutes
- Country: Japan
- Language: Japanese

Suzunosuke Akado: The Birdman with Three Eyes (Japanese: 赤胴鈴之助 三つ目の鳥人, Hepburn: Akadō Suzunosuke: Mitsume no chōjin) (Note: Also known as Bird Man With Three Eyes.) is a 1958 Japanese tokusatsu fantasy drama film directed by Kazuo Mori, and written by Shigeo Okamoto. It is the seventh entry in the Suzunosuke Akado film series, after Suzunosuke Akado: The One-Legged Demon, which was released the previous year. Suzunosuke Akado: The Birdman with Three Eyes stars Shoji Umewaka, Tamao Nakamura, Yatarō Kurokawa, and Ryūzaburō Mitsuoka. The film was followed by Suzunosuke Akado: The Thunder Man of Kurokumo Valley, released in the same year on November 15.

== Plot ==
A three-eyed birdman appears in the town of Edo kidnapping children and Suzunosuke Akado (Shoji Umewaka) must defeat the birdman before he turns the town into chaos.

== Cast ==
- Shoji Umewaka as Suzunosuke Akado
- Tamao Nakamura as Shinobu
- Yatarō Kurokawa as Shusaku Chiba
- Ryūzaburō Mitsuoka as Takebayashibo
- Mieko Kondo as Hagino
- Yasuhiko Shima as Doi Awamori
- Masaya Tsukida as Matsutaro
- Kanae Kobayashi as Sorceress
- Chieko Murata

== Release ==
Suzunosuke Akado: The Birdman with Three Eyes was released in Japan on March 11, 1958 and re-released in Japan on July 17, 1971 as a double feature with Gamera vs. Zigra.

The film was released on DVD by Victor Film on December 20, 2002.
