= Family II =

Family II can refer to:

- Family II engine, a straight-4 Opel-designed engine from the 1970s debuting in 1979
- Ii clan (井伊氏), a Japanese family of samurai
- Family 2 (film), a 2001 film by Takashi Miike

== See also ==
- Family (disambiguation)
- Ii (disambiguation)
