= Equinox Flower =

Equinox Flower Higanbana
- Film poster
- Directed by: Yasujirō Ozu
- Written by: Kōgo Noda, Yasujirō Ozu
- Based on: novel by Ton Satomi
- Produced by: Shizuo Yamanouchi
- Starring: Ineko Arima; Yoshiko Kuga; Keiji Sada; Shin Saburi; Kinuyo Tanaka; Chishū Ryū; Fujiko Yamamoto
- Cinematography: Yuharu Atsuta
- Edited by: Yoshiyasu Hamamura
- Music by: Takanobu Saitō
- Distributed by: Shochiku
- Release date: September 7, 1958
- Running time: 118 minutes
- Country: Japan
- Language: Japanese

Equinox Flower (彼岸花, Higanbana) is a 1958 color Japanese film directed by Yasujirō Ozu which is based on a novel by Ton Satomi.

== Plot ==
Wataru Hirayama (Shin Saburi) is a wealthy Tokyo businessman. When an old schoolmate Mikami (Chishū Ryū) approaches him for help concerning his daughter Fumiko (Yoshiko Kuga), who has run off owing to a conflict with her father, he agrees. Finding her in a bar where she now works, he listens to her side of the story. Fumiko complains that her father is stubborn, insisting on arranging her marriage, whereas she has now fallen in love with a musician and is adamant to lead life her own way.

One day during work, a young man named Masahiko Taniguchi (Keiji Sada) approaches Hirayama to ask for the hand of his elder daughter, Setsuko (Ineko Arima). Hirayama is extremely unhappy that his daughter has made wedding plans on her own. He confronts her at home and says that she must not go to work until she sees the folly of her ways. Hirayama tries to find out more about Taniguchi from his subordinate.

Owing to the standoff, his daughter's friend Yukiko (Fujiko Yamamoto) tries a ruse in which she asks Hirayama's opinion concerning a similar situation – her mother forcing her to marry someone she didn't like. When Hirayama advises her to ignore her mother, Yukiko reveals it is all a setup and states that Hirayama has just given his consent to Setsuko's marriage.

Despite the ruse, Hirayama remains unchanged and Hirayama's wife Kiyoko (Kinuyo Tanaka) accuses her husband of being "inconsistent". Even his younger daughter Hisako (Miyuki Kuwano) is on the side of her sister, finding her father too old-fashioned. Finally, after the couple's insistence on getting married, Hirayama decides to give in by attending his daughter's wedding.

After the wedding, Mikami reveals that he, like Hirayama, has agreed to let his daughter select her own marriage partner. After going for a short business trip outside Tokyo, Hirayama decides to visit the newly-weds at Hiroshima by train, where Taniguchi is stationed by his company.

== Cast ==
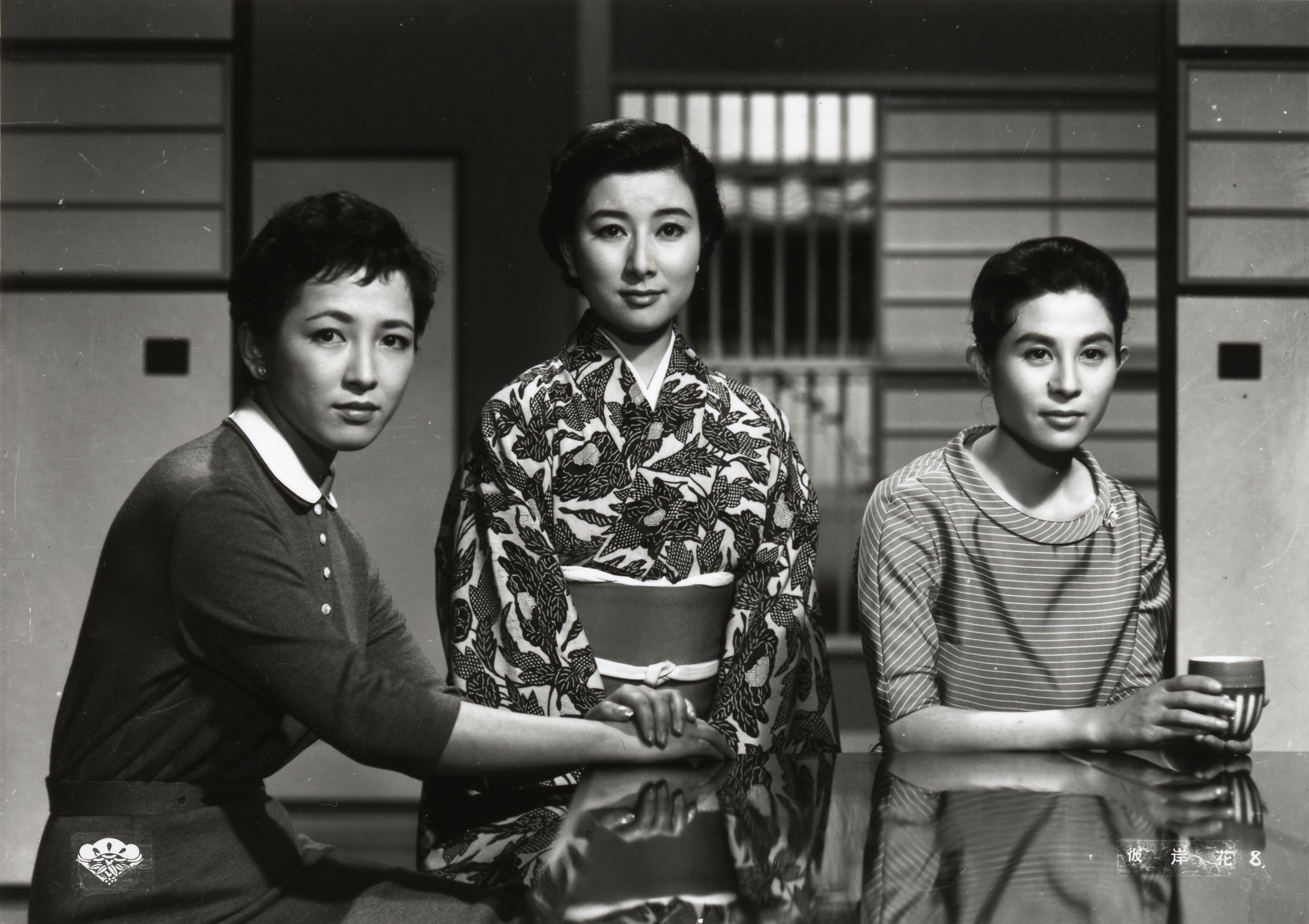
Studio still showing from left: Ineko Arima, Fujiko Yamamoto and Yoshiko Kuga

- Ineko Arima - Setsuko Hirayama
- Fujiko Yamamoto - Yukiko Sasaki
- Yoshiko Kuga - Fumiko Mikami
- Shin Saburi - Wataru Hirayama
- Kinuyo Tanaka - Kiyoko Hirayama
- Miyuki Kuwano - Hisako Hirayama
- Chishū Ryū - Shukichi Mikami
- Keiji Sada - Masahiko Taniguchi
- Teiji Takahashi - Shotaru Kondo
- Chieko Naniwa - Hatsu Sasaki
- Fumio Watanabe - Ichiro Nagamura
- Nobuo Nakamura - Toshihiko Kawai
- Ryūji Kita - Heinosuke Horie
- Ureo Egawa - Schoolmate at alumni reunion
- Tsûsai Sugawara - Schoolmate at alumni reunion

== Production ==
It is Yasujirō Ozu's first film in color, while Japan's first color film, Keisuke Kinoshita's Carmen Comes Home, had been released in 1951. Ozu chose Agfa film from Germany over Kodak or Fujifilm, as he felt that it conveyed red colors better. The meaning of "equinox flower" or "higanbana" of the title is the red Lycoris.

Shochiku requested that Ozu shoot Equinox Flower in color primarily to showcase Fujiko Yamamoto, the Daiei superstar it had borrowed for the film. The movie is constructed to spotlight the actress, who is elevated with extended dialogue scenes as a protégé of Hirayama who drives the plot resolution from the sidelines, and she won the 1958 Blue Ribbon Award as Best Actress for Equinox Flower and The Snowy Heron, which featured her in a much showier starring role. Yamamoto also receives what may be the only solo screen credit in any of Ozu's films, which starred some of the biggest names in Japanese cinema.

== Release ==
=== Critical reception ===
Equinox Flower garnered 88% approval on Rotten Tomatoes, with an average rating of 7.4/10. Dave Kehr praised the film as "gentle, spare, and ultimately elusive, in a quietly satisfying way." Equinox Flower received four votes in the 2012 Sight & Sound critics' poll of the world's greatest films. Roger Ebert wrote, " In Equinox Flower, a Japanese film by the old master Yasujiro Ozu, there is this sequence of shots: A room with a red teapot in the foreground. Another view of the room. The mother folding clothes. A shot down a corridor with a mother crossing it at an angle, and then a daughter crossing at the back. A reverse shot in the hallway as the arriving father is greeted by the mother and daughter. A shot as the father leaves the frame, then the mother, then the daughter. A shot as the mother and father enter the room, as in the background the daughter picks up the red pot and leaves the frame. This sequence of timed movement and cutting is as perfect as any music ever written, any dance, any poem." Leonard Maltin gave it three of four stars: "Another gentle and quietly observant study of parents and children from Ozu, this time imbued with a sense of melancholy over traditional ways being supplanted by impersonal modern society."

=== Home media ===
In 2007, The Criterion Collection released the film as part of the DVD box set Eclipse Series 3: Late Ozu.

In 2011, the BFI released a Region 2 Dual Format Edition (Blu-ray + DVD). Included with this release is a standard definition presentation of There Was a Father.
