= The Magistrate =

The Magistrate may refer to:

- The Magistrate (play), an 1885 farce by Arthur Wing Pinero
  - The Magistrate (1921 film), a silent British film adaptation
- The Magistrate (1955 film), a black-and-white Japanese film
- The Magistrate (1959 film), an Italian film by Luigi Zampa
- The Magistrate (miniseries), a 1989 Italian, Australian, and Swiss miniseries

== See also ==
- Magistrate, a civilian officer who administers the law
