= Suzunosuke Akado: The Moonlight Monster =

- Japanese theatrical release poster
- Directed by: Bin Kato
- Written by: Shigeo Okamoto; Tetsuro Yoshida; Masanori Matsumura
- Based on: Akado Suzunosuke by Tsunayoshi Takeuchi
- Produced by: Shin Sakai
- Starring: Shoji Umewaka; Tamao Nakamura
- Cinematography: Hiroshi Imai
- Music by: Urato Watanabe
- Production company: Daiei Film
- Distributed by: Daiei
- Release date: June 18, 1957 (Japan)
- Running time: 57 minutes
- Country: Japan
- Language: Japanese

Suzunosuke Akado: The Moonlight Monster (Japanese: 赤胴鈴之助 月夜の怪人, Hepburn: Akadō Suzunosuke: Tsukiyo no Kaijin) is a 1957 Japanese tokusatsu fantasy drama film directed by Bin Kato. Produced and distributed by Daiei Film, it is the second in the Suzunosuke Akado franchise. The film was followed by Suzunosuke Akado: Defeat the Demon-Faced Gang, released in the same year on August 13.

== Plot ==
In his youth, Suzunosuke Akado (Shoji Umewaka) faces off against his best friend who has joined a gang of criminals.

== Cast ==
- Shoji Umewaka as Akado Suzunosuke
- Tamao Nakamura as Shinobu
- Yatarō Kurokawa as Shusaku Chiba
- Setsuko Hama
- Narutoshi Hayashi

== Release ==
Suzunosuke Akado: The Moonlight Monster was released in Japan on June 18, 1957.

The film was released on DVD by Victor Film on December 20, 2002.
