= Flowery Hood =

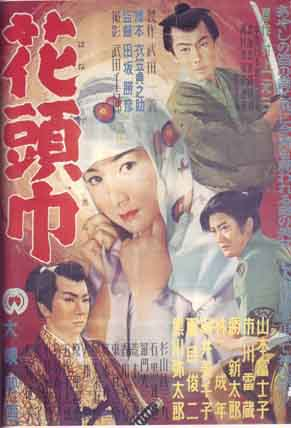
- Japanese movie poster
- Directed by: Katsuhiko Tasaka
- Screenplay by: Teinosuke Kinugasa
- Story by: Genzō Murakami
- Produced by: Kazuyoshi Takeda
- Starring: Ichikawa Raizō VIII; Shintaro Katsu
- Cinematography: Senkichirō Takeda
- Music by: Urato Watanabe
- Distributed by: Daiei Film
- Release date: July 27, 1956 (Japan)
- Running time: 84 minutes
- Country: Japan
- Language: Japanese

Flowery Hood (Japanese: 花頭巾, Hepburn: Hana Zukin) is a 1956 black-and-white Japanese film directed by Katsuhiko Tasaka.

== Cast ==
- Ichikawa Raizō VIII
- Shintaro Katsu
