= Katsuhiko Tasaka =

Japanese film director (1914 -1979)

Katsuhiko Tasaka (田坂 勝彦, Tasaka Katsuhiko; 28 May 1914 – 29 September 1979) was a Japanese film director. He directed films from 1930s to 1960s. His older brother, Tomotaka Tasaka (田坂具隆), was also a Japanese film director.

== Filmography ==
Katsuhiko Tasaka directed over 40 films:

- The Great White Tiger Platoon (1954)
- Fighting Birds (1956)
- Migratory Birds of the Flowers (1956)
- Flowery Hood (1956)
- Flowery Hood 2 (1956)
- Hidden Story of the Yagyu Clan (1956)
- Ghost Cat of Yonaki Swamp (1957)
- Tōkaidō no yarō domo (1958)
