= Asatarō garasu =

- Japanese film poster
- Directed by: Kenji Misumi
- Starring: Raizo Ichikawa; Yataro Kurokawa; Masamiku Sugiyama
- Cinematography: Senkichiro Takeda
- Music by: Gento Uehara
- Distributed by: Daiei Film
- Release date: March 28, 1956 (Japan)
- Running time: 85 minutes
- Country: Japan
- Language: Japanese

Asatarō garasu (浅太郎鴉), also known as Asatarō or Asataro the Crow in English, is a 1956 Japanese black-and-white film directed by Kenji Misumi.

== Cast ==
- Raizo Ichikawa
- Yataro Kurokawa
- Masamiku Sugiyama
- and others
