= Urato Watanabe =

Japanese composer (1909–1994)

- 渡辺浦人
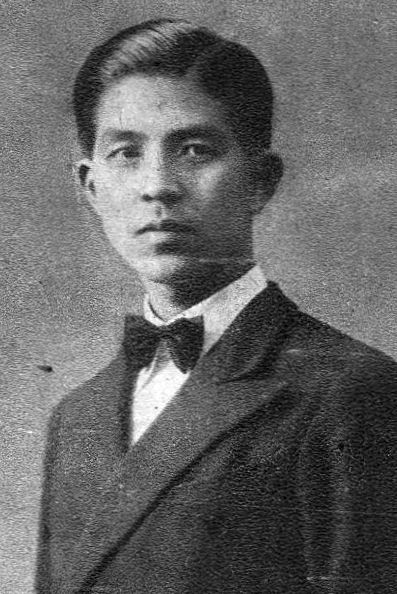
- Watanabe c. 1942
- Born: March 2, 1909; Aomori, Japan
- Died: October 18, 1994 (aged 85)
- Occupations: Composer, educator
- Years active: 1940–1978
- Children: 1

Urato Watanabe (渡辺浦人, Watanabe Urato; March 2, 1909 – October 18, 1994) was a Japanese classical and film music composer.

== Early life ==
Urato Watanabe was born on March 2, 1909, in Aomori, Japan, his family moved to Tokyo when he was two years old. He studied music at the Tokyo University of the Arts and graduating in 1929. In 1955, Watanabe traveled to Europe for the first time to participate in the International Folk Music Conference in Oslo, Norway.

== Works ==
=== Film scores ===
- Shirayuki-sensei to kodomo-tachi (1950)
- Song of Love (1951)
- Elegy (1951)
- Bird Hyakusho (1951) - Vocals
- Mōjū Tsukai no Shōjo (1952)
- The Great White Tiger Platoon (1954)
- The Second Son (1955)
- Flowery Hood (1956)
- Flowery Hood 2 (1956)
- Migratory Birds of the Flowers (1956)
- A Man in the Storm (1957)
- Suzunosuke Akado (1957)
- Nikutai no hankō (1957)
- Suzunosuke Akado: The Moonlight Monster (1957)
- Suzunosuke Akado: Defeat the Demon-Faced Gang (1957)
- Suzunosuke Akado: The Vacuum Slash of Asuka (1957)
- Suzunosuke Akado: The Demon of Shingetsu Tower (1957)
- Onibi Kago (1957)
- Demonfire Palanquin (1957)
- Suzunosuke Akado: The One-Legged Demon (1957)
- Suzunosuke Akado: The Birdman with Three Eyes (1958)
- Suzunosuke Akado: The Thunder Man of Kurokumo Valley (1958)
- Suzunosuke Akado: Defeat the Skull Gang (1958)
- Maboroshi Tantei: Chiteijin Shūrai (1960)
- Doggie March (1963)
- Human Bones (1978)

=== Television ===
- Osomatsu-kun (1966) - Soundtrack writer
- Judgment (1962)
