= Nuregami kenpō =

- DVD cover
- Directed by: Bin Kato
- Written by: Hasaharu Matsumura
- Produced by: Shin Sakai
- Starring: Raizo Ichikawa; Kaoru Yachigusa; Tamao Nakamura; Michiko Ai
- Cinematography: Senkichirō Takeda
- Music by: Seiichi Suzuki
- Production company: Daiei Film
- Release date: November 8, 1958 (Japan)
- Running time: 89 minutes
- Country: Japan
- Language: Japanese

Nuregami kenpō (Japanese: 濡れ髪剣法) is a 1958 black-and-white Japanese film directed by Bin Kato.

== Cast ==
- Raizo Ichikawa as Gennosuke Matsudaira
- Kaoru Yachigusa
- Tamao Nakamura
- Michiko Ai
