= Karate for Life =

- Film poster
- Directed by: Kazuhiko Yamaguchi
- Starring: Sonny Chiba
- Music by: Hajime Kaburagi
- Distributed by: Toei Company
- Release date: 1977
- Running time: 87 minutes
- Country: Japan
- Language: Japanese

Karate for Life (Japanese: 空手バカ一代, Hepburn: Karate Baka Ichidai) is a 1977 Japanese martial arts film about the martial arts master Mas Oyama, starring Sonny Chiba.

It is a sequel to Champion of Death and Karate Bear Fighter, and is the third part in the Champion of Death series, a series of movie adaptations of the Karate Baka Ichidai by Ikki Kajiwara. Like the previous two films, it was a combination of starring actor Sonny Chiba and director Kazuhiko Yamaguchi.

== Plot ==
Master karate fighter Masutatsu Oyama finds himself ostracized by the Karate Society of Japan for his past fights with both a bull and a bear. Working as a bouncer for the local Yakuza, he challenges a local dojo to single combat. The Sensei ridicules his challenge, and sends his students to take him on, but despite their numbers and attempts at cheating, he dispatches over 100 of them. When the Sensei himself fights Oyama, he ends up losing an eye.

Oyama is invited to go to Okinawa to join a wrestler and a judo expert fight in what turns out to be glorified wrestling matches in which Japanese are supposed to lose, to provide entertainment for the American soldiers there. The local mob also controls this enterprise, unknown to Oyama. He refuses to adhere to the demands to throw the fights, and when he wins too many, the gangsters go after his friend who hired him, beating him into a pulp. The three men go their separate ways, and Oyama returns to the mainland.

Back at home, a gang of kids steals his pack. He lays chase to them, but then sees men assaulting a prostitute with a drinking problem, who then attempts to kill her self; he intervenes and saves her. Finding one of the teens who stole his belongings, he follows them to their clubhouse, where they try in vain to fight him. When more threatening adult gangsters show up to harass them, however, he defends the teens and they bond. He later crosses paths with his fighter friends, and they consider resuming their business. He also discovers the ersatz leader of the youths is the younger brother of the prostitute he protected. She comes down with tuberculosis, and learning that the penicillin that can help her will cost $600.00, he agrees to another fixed fight. But again, rather than take the fall, he wins the fight instead, and goes on the run with his friends. The Yakuza torture and kill the prostitute, then attack her brother, in order to find him, and during their confrontation, his previously battered friend dies during the resulting mayhem.

Oyama and his surviving partner come to the gangsters' compound, and discover they have enlisted the Sensei whose eye he earlier put out, and his fighters, as added muscle. He dispatches enough of the fighters to ultimately go one on one with the rival Sensei, and finally the crime boss. Standing on a cliff in the aftermath, he declares, "My way is endless".

== Cast ==
- Sonny Chiba as Mas Oyama
- Kōjirō Hongō as Shuzō Fujita
- Hideo Murota as Great Yamashita
- Yōko Natsuki as Reiko
- Asao Uchida as Ryu Hō Gen
- Masashi Ishibashi as Gōzō Yonashima

== Home media ==
On November 14, 2023, Shout! Studios released the original Japanese edit of the film in their Sonny Chiba Collection: Volume 2 Blu-ray set, which also includes Golgo 13: Assignment Kowloon, The Defensive Power of Aikido, 13 Steps of Maki, The Great Okinawa Yakuza War, Karate Warriors, and The Okinawa War of Ten Years.
