= Bin Kato =

- 加戸 敏
- Born: 加藤 善太郎 (Katō Zentarō); June 20, 1907; Yokohama, Kanagawa, Japan
- Died: July 27, 1982 (aged 75); Kyoto, Kyoto, Japan
- Occupation(s): Film director, screenwriter
- Years active: 1934–1967
- Known for: Drama/Horror/Action films
- Children: 2

Bin Kato (加戸 敏, Katō Bin) (born Zentaro Kato (加藤 善太郎, Katō Zentarō); June 20, 1907 – July 27, 1982) was a Japanese film director and screenwriter best known for his Japanese horror films (J-Horror).

== Filmography ==
=== Assistant director ===
- The Captain's Daughter (1936)

=== Director ===
- Kuroobi Arashi (1953)
- The Ghost Cat of Ouma Crossing (1954)
- Tanuki Battle of Awaodori Festival (1954)
- The Magistrate (1955)
- The Iroha Elegy (1955)
- The Magical Warrior (1955)
- Thief and Magistrate (1955)
- Ghost-Cat of Gojusan-Tsugi (1956)
- Suzunosuke Akado (1957)
- Suzunosuke Akado: The Moonlight Monster (1957)
- Nuregami kenpō (1958)
- Hitohada Jumon (1960)
- Yokaden (1960)
- The Lightning Sword (1962)
- Ghost Story of Devil’s Fire Swamp (1963)
