= A Mother's Love (1950 film) =

1929 Japanese film

- Promotional still

Japanese name
- Kanji: 母情
- Directed by: Hiroshi Shimizu
- Written by: Hiroshi Shimizu; Matsuo Kishi
- Produced by: Hiroshi Shimizu; Matsuo Kishi
- Starring: Nijiko Kiyokawa; Yatarō Kurokawa; Musei Tokugawa
- Cinematography: Minoru Yokoyama
- Edited by: Hidetoshi Kasama
- Music by: Yūji Koseki
- Production company: Shintōhō
- Distributed by: Shintōhō
- Release date: 27 June 1950 (Japan)
- Running time: 86 minutes
- Country: Japan
- Language: Japanese

A Mother's Love (Japanese: 母情, Hepburn: Bojō) is a 1950 Japanese drama film directed by Hiroshi Shimizu.

== Plot ==
Toshiko, mother of three children, all from different fathers, travels from Tokyo to the countryside to give them into foster care, as they get in the way to her occupation as a bar owner. After her daughter has been taken in by her brother Gentaro, himself father of eight children, and her younger son by her uncle Yokogawa, she heads for the home of her former nurse Oseki, who now runs a tea house in the mountains. On the way, Toshiko meets an elderly woman who looks after her grandchild, as her daughter, the child's mother and member of a troupe of travelling actors, refuses to give it away even under difficult circumstances. She resides at an inn with her elder son Fusao, where she falls ill and moves into a room with painter Takuoka as the inn is booked out. Mitsuko, Toshiko's business partner, pays her a visit and gets entangled with Takuoka. Toshiko eventually meets with Oseki, but instead of asking her to take Fusao in as she had originally intended, she decides to raise her children on her own, even if she will have to face financial hardships.

== Cast ==
- Nijiko Kiyokawa as Toshiko Kamura
- Yatarō Kurokawa as Takuoka, the painter
- Musei Tokugawa as Yokogawa, Toshiko's uncle
- Roppa Furukawa as Gentaro, Toshiko's brother
- Chōko Iida as old lady
- Isuzu Yamada as Mitsuko
- Reiko Miyagawa as Fudeko, Yokogawa's daughter
- Kumeko Urabe as Oseki
- Kyōko Akemi

== Legacy ==
A Mother's Love was screened at the Österreichische Filmmuseum in 2005 and at the Cinémathèque française in 2020 and 2021.

In its article on the Shimizu retrospective held at the Österreichische Filmmuseum, newspaper Der Standard wrote, the female protagonist's "odyssey is a process of healing–as is the complete work of Hiroshi Shimizu".
