= Family 2 (film) =

2001 film by Takashi Miike

- Directed by: Takashi Miike
- Screenplay by: Hisao Maki
- Based on: manga by Hisao Maki
- Produced by: Hisao Maki; Tsuguo Oikawa
- Cinematography: Hikaru Yasuda
- Edited by: Yasushi Shimamura
- Music by: Monkey Pirates (Makoto Kubota, Hideki Matsuda, Akira "Bob" Suganuma, Aki Suzuya)
- Release date: 2001
- Running time: 80 minutes
- Country: Japan
- Language: Japanese

Family 2 is a 2001 Japanese yakuza film directed by Takashi Miike, released on home video as the sequel to his earlier film Family.

== Plot ==
After attacking Mutsumi headquarters with a tank, Takashi and his rescued wife Mariko hide out with Mr. Shao in Chinatown while Hideshi continues to seek out Takeshi. Hideshi finds Takeshi working in an alligator costume selling balloons. Rie wanted him to get a legitimate job and they are staying at a church down the road from where she grew up in a geisha house run by her father. Rie spends her time caring for a friend from high school who has been hospitalized since being injured in an automobile accident while Rie was driving. Rie's mother died and she does not get along with her step-mother Chiharu Ishibashi, who runs the geisha house alone now that Rie's father has also died. Chiharu feels that Rie blames her for her father's death so she angrily sells information about her daughter-in-law's location to Kenmochi's men for 20 million yen.

Takeshi visits his mother Haruko in the care home, where she calls him Iwaida in confusion and reveals that she became pregnant with Iwaida's son and chose to raise him as Takeshi. Hideshi confirms this story when Takeshi visits him but wonders why Mr. Nishiwaki would choose to have Takeshi kill Iwaida if he knew that Iwaida was Takeshi's father. Kenmochi's men arrive at the church but Chiharu has a change of heart and jumps between them and Rie, subsequently dying from gunshot wounds. Hideshi grabs Rie while Takeshi quickly shoots all of Kenmochi's men.

Hideshi returns home to his wife and daughter Natsumi in Yokohama. Officer Shiraki from the Yamashita Police Department visits Hideshi and tells him that Yamaguchi from the Hyogo Police Department wants his help solving the Iwaida murder in Kyoto. Shiraki knows that the hitman is Lightning Takeshi, that is to say Takeshi Miwa, Hideshi's younger brother, and has been told by Yamaguchi to keep an eye on the Miwa house. He also wants to find Hideshi's other brother Takashi because of the murder of Kenmochi's man when they rescued Mariko. Hideshi pays off the cop and tells him to release the pastor they've been questioning from the church shooting. He sends Shiraki to investigate Kenmochi, the acting head of the Mutsumi Group, and his involvement with the incident.

Hideshi moves Takeshi and Rie to a dojo but Takeshi does not trust Mr. Maki, the head of the dojo. Hideshi's secretary Tono explains that Mr. Maki took Hideshi in and mentored him after he killed the man who killed his father. As he learned karate from Mr. Maki his heart was slowly healed.

Tono accompanies Hideshi, his wife, and his daughter Nastumi on a boat ride where they are attacked by three men on personal watercraft. The men circle the boat and shoot their guns into it but do not kill anyone. Hisako offers herself to Hideshi once again in a move to combine forces in order to gain influence with Mr. Nishiwaki and push Omaeda out of power but Hideshi rejects her again. Hideshi is informed by Shiraki that Kenmochi is trying to blackmail Nishiwaki using information that Iwaidi knew which led to his killing. Haruko commits suicide and the three brothers go to her wake together. They honor her last wish to have them bring her ashes back to the family home. Several armed men attack the home and end up killing Takashi. Mariko grieves heavily.

Hideshi asks Hisako to get the information from Omaeda. She has one of her dominatrices torture Omaeda until he passes out but he does not speak so they inject him with drugs to get him to talk. He admits that Nishiwaki sold information about the underworld to GHQ during the six years that the occupation forces remained in Japan after the war and it was only through this connection that he could amass his fortune and gain as much influence as he did. GHQ disappeared along with any documents about these activities so only Nishiwaki's henchman Omaeda, Iwaida, and Iwaida's lover Haruko knew about Nishiwaki's actions after the war that would cause him to lose power in the underworld if they were exposed.

Hideshi calls Nishiwaki and asks him to go with him to the Philippines to carry out the deal for the counterfeit money. In Manila Nishiwaki has the brothers attacked by a shooter from a helicopter and armed guerrillas on the beach. Nishiwaki offers Hisako the Number 2 position but she reveals that she has higher ambitions as Hideshi and Takeshi arrive to kill Nishiwaki.

== Cast ==
- Kenichi Endō as Kenmochi
- Kojiro Hongo
- Naoko Inoue
- Koichi Iwaki as Hideshi Miwa
- Taishu Kase as Takeshi Miwa
- Ryuji Katagiri
- Kazuya Kimura as Takashi Miwa
- Toshiya Nagasawa
- Yōko Natsuki
- Marumi Shiraishi
- Shigenobu Yasuda
- Rikiya Yasuoka

== Home video ==
Family 2 was released on Region 1 home video on April 17, 2007. A Region 1 two-DVD set (together with Family) was released on February 21, 2008.
