= Family (2001 film) =

2001 film directed by Takashi Miike

- Directed by: Takashi Miike
- Screenplay by: Hisao Maki
- Based on: manga by Hisao Maki
- Cinematography: Takashi Miike; Hikaru Yasuda
- Edited by: Yasushi Shimamura
- Music by: Monkey Pirates (Makoto Kubota, Hideki Matsuda, Akira "Bob" Suganuma, Aki Suzuya)
- Release date: March 10, 2001
- Running time: 78 minutes
- Country: Japan
- Language: Japanese

Family is a 2001 Japanese yakuza film directed by Takashi Miike. This film together with its sequel Family 2 comprise the complete Family saga.

== Plot ==
Iwaida of the Nishiwaki Group is sent by his boss to collect a debt. He does not find the debtor so he rapes the debtor's wife Haruko while her husband and young son Takashi hide secretly in the closet. The husband later gets drunk during the daytime and gets into a fight with some street thugs who beat him to death. His older son Hideshi encounters them and kills one of the thugs by stomping on his skull.
30 years later in Kyoto a hired killer shoots three men protecting Iwaida in a lift. The aging Iwaida, now head of the Mutsumi Group, recognizes him by a scar on his left cheek before he is shot dead by the killer. A nurse witnesses the killing but the killer lets her live. Two men later question Mr. Yoshikawa, a witness who saw the nurse on the roof at the time the murder of Iwaida was committed, but they gain no information. They manage to get an image of the killer's scar from the camera footage and identify him as "Lightning Takeshi", the most famous killer in Japan.
While driving to a crime family meeting in Yokohama, the wealthy criminal Hideshi Miwa notices another vehicle with a Kyoto license plate following him and has security at his house beefed up by his man Kono. The host calls the meeting to order and first hears from the Kanto Block. The woman running the block, Hisako, says that things are set up so that the newspapers and TV stations will be on top of the matter of corruption within the Ministry of International Trade and Industry when the time is right. The host then calls upon Omaeda of the Osaka-Kobe block to speak. After that Hideshi explains that profits are 10% less than in the previous year but he is expecting counterfeit money from the Philippines, which will mean a total of 360 billion yen for the family. Finally, Omaeda announces that the secret code word name of the organization, "Japan Mafia", has been leaked to the outside. Hideshi explains that there is either a traitor in their midst or else someone from another group deliberately leaked the code word from negotiations.
After the meeting, Hisako shows Hideshi a photo of the killer with the scar that the Mutsumi Group is distributing around Tokyo. Hideshi recognizes the killer as his younger brother Takeshi but feels that Iwaida needed to die. Hideshi asks if the boss asked for his younger brother to killer Iwaida and Hisako admits that he did because Iwaida was a thorn in the side of the crime family. Even though they could crush the Mutsumi Group, the boss wishes to avoid an all-out war so Hisako asks Hideshi to find his brother before the killer goes into hiding. She also asks if he would like to have sex with her but he merely leaves.
Hideshi's younger brother Takashi is also an underboss in the crime family. He and Hideshi visit their mother at a care home but she is suffering from Alzheimer's and claims not to know anyone named Takeshi. The nurses recall that Takeshi visited earlier in the month, the day before the murder of Iwaida, and that he would not be able to come back for a while so he made arrangements to have money sent to her but did not leave any address. Hideshi and Takashi split up, with Hideshi searching Kyoto and Takashi combing Kobe and Osaka.
At the police station Detective Kakuta questions the nurse Rie Ishibashi. She denies that the man in the photograph is the killer, claiming that the killer did not have any scar on his cheek. One of the men searching for Takeshi bribes Detective Kakuta at a pachinko parlor. Katuka gives Rie Ishibashi's name and explains that no one called for a nurse. Takeshi tracks down the girl working as an escort role-playing a nurse.
Takashi speaks with Hatanaka at Rakuhoku University, a fellow student of Takeshi's from his study of medicine, who says that Takeshi spoke with him two days after the murder. At that time Takeshi said that he was cursed and that his enemies were watching all of the roads and flights, preventing him from leaving the city, but when he ran out of money he planned on hitting the headquarters with guns blazing to die a noble death. He then says that he spoke with Takeshi again earlier that morning, when Takeshi said that he had been reunited with the love of his life, his "angel in white", and was leaving Kyoto with her.
Takashi receives a call from Kenmochi, head of the Mutsumi group, who has kidnapped Takashi's wife Mariko and demands that he hand over "Lightning Takeshi" before the week is over. Takashi drives through the gates of their headquarters with a tank so Kenmochi quickly rapes Mariko while he has time. Takashi and Hideshi beat up Kenmochi's men and find Mariko as she is being raped by one of the henchmen, whom Takashi shoots.
Takashi and Hideshi meet with their boss, who explains that Kenmochi has leaked photos to the police of Takashi and Hideshi from the murder. He asks if they have found Takeshi. Takashi says that they have. He plays Hideshi a phone message he received from Hatanaka saying that Takeshi contacted him and told him that he was in Nagano. They hide Mariko with Mr. Shao, a Chinese friend living in Chinatown. Mariko grew up in China and feels close to him. He agrees to take in Takashi as well so Hideshi leaves Takashi and Mariko with Mr. Shao to seek out Takeshi alone.

== Cast ==
- Kenichi Endō as Kenmochi
- Kojiro Hongo
- Koichi Iwaki as Hideshi Miwa
- Taishu Kase as Takeshi Miwa
- Ryuji Katagiri
- Kazuya Kimura as Takashi Miwa
- Toshiya Nagasawa
- Yōko Natsuki
- Marumi Shiraishi
- Rikiya Yasuoka
- Tatsumaru Kaki

== Other credits ==
- Produced by
  - Naoki Abe - producer
  - Hiroyuki Fujiwara - co-planner
  - Hidehiro Ito - executive producer: Excellent Film, planner
  - Hisao Maki - producer
  - Tsugio Oikawa - producer
  - Masahiro Tanaka - planner
  - Ogita Yamamoto - producer
- Production Manager: Tetsushi Onoyama
- Assistant Director: Kazuhito Kubodera
- Sound Department: Yukiya Sato
- Lighting Technician: Masaki Miyawaki

== Sequel ==
The story is continued in its sequel Family 2, released on home video.
