= Hitohada Kujaku =

- Film poster
- Directed by: Kazuo Mori
- Written by: Masaharu Matsumura
- Produced by: Shin Sakai
- Cinematography: Sōichi Aisaka
- Edited by: Mitsuzō Miyata
- Music by: Ichirō Saitō
- Distributed by: Daiei Film
- Release date: August 3, 1958 (Japan)
- Running time: 99 minutes
- Country: Japan
- Language: Japanese

Hitohada Kujaku (Japanese: 人肌孔雀; lit. Human Skin Peacock), also known as The Swishing Sword, is a 1958 Japanese film directed by Kazuo Mori.

== Cast ==
- Fujiko Yamamoto
- Raizo Ichikawa as Shinpachiro Nasu
- Shoji Umewaka
- Seizaburo Kozo
- Mieko Kondo
- Sonisuke Samawara
