= Suzunosuke Akado: The One-Legged Demon =

- Japanese theatrical release poster
- Directed by: Kimiyoshi Yasuda
- Screenplay by: Tetsuro Yoshida
- Starring: Shoji Umewaka; Tamao Nakamura; Yatarō Kurokawa; Eigoro Onoe; Ryūzaburō Mitsuoka
- Cinematography: Aisaka Sōichi
- Edited by: Shigeo Nishida
- Music by: Urato Watanabe
- Production company: Daiei Film
- Distributed by: Daiei
- Release date: December 28, 1957 (Japan)
- Running time: 64 minutes
- Country: Japan
- Language: Japanese

Suzunosuke Akado: The One-Legged Demon (Japanese: 赤胴鈴之助 一本足の魔人, Hepburn: Akadō Suzunosuke: Ippon ashi no majin) (Note: Also known as Combat of Master Magicians.) is a 1957 Japanese tokusatsu fantasy drama film directed by Kimiyoshi Yasuda, and written by Tetsuro Yoshida. Produced and distributed by Daiei Film, it is the sixth in the Suzunosuke Akado film series, after Suzunosuke Akado: The Vacuum Slash of Asuka, which was released in the same year on August 25. Suzunosuke Akado: The One-Legged Demon stars Shoji Umewaka, Tamao Nakamura, Yatarō Kurokawa, Eigoro Onoe, and Ryūzaburō Mitsuoka. The film was followed by Suzunosuke Akado: The Birdman with Three Eyes the following year.

== Plot ==
Suzunosuke Akado (Shoji Umewaka) faces off against a gang of cutthroats, who are led by a peg-legged pirate.

== Cast ==
- Shoji Umewaka as Akado Suzunosuke
- Tamao Nakamura as Shinobu
- Yatarō Kurokawa as Shusaku Chiba
- Keiko Fujita as Amerika
- Ryūzaburō Mitsuoka as Takebayashibo
- Yuji Hamada as Daikichi
- Narutoshi Hayashi
- Eigoro Onoe
- Michio Yuri

== Release ==
Suzunosuke Akado: The One-Legged Demon was released in Japan on December 28, 1957.

The film was released on DVD by Victor Film on December 20, 2002.
