= Abare Hasshū Goyō Tabi =

Abare Hasshū Goyō Tabi (あばれ八州御用旅) was a network prime-time television jidaigeki series in Japan from 1991 to 1994. It starred Teruhiko Saigō.

The series began in 1991 in the 9:00 p.m. time slot on the TV Tokyo network. Saigō created the role of Tōdō Heihachirō. The character was a Kantō torishimari shitsuyaku (関東取締執役), a law-enforcement official of the Tokugawa shogunate, with broad jurisdiction over the Kantō region surrounding the shogunal capital at Edo. A common alternative name for the post was Hasshū-mawari, alluding to the eight provinces (hasshū) of the region; the title incorporates this name. He traveled incognito, investigating the places he visited, and donned a white costume for the finale, in which he killed all the wrongdoers.

The cast included many other widely known entertainers. Jun'ichi Nitta had a repeating role as a doctor on Abarenbō Shōgun and appeared in Ultraman Dyna, Mito Kōmon, the NHK Taiga drama Dokuganryū Masamune, Chōshichirō Edo Nikki and other television series. Yōko Natsuki was a regular member of the original cast of Abarenbō Shōgun. Beat Kiyoshi is an owarai comic, formerly partner of Beat Takeshi. Tetsuo Kurata is known for his role in Kamen Rider Black/Kamen Rider Black RX and other tokusatsu productions. Daijirō Tsutsumi has risen to prominence in guest roles, and has had other regular parts. He joined the fire-fighting company as a bookkeeper in Abarenbō Shōgun, and portrays shogun Tokugawa Tsunayoshi on Mito Kōmon. Reiko Takashima has starred in many jidaigeki and present-day series. Raita Ryū, who played the bounty-hunter Yamasaki Tetsunosuke, has dozens of supporting and guest-star roles to his credit. Among them are Amari Torayasu in the 2007 taiga drama Fūrin Kazan.

The series was produced by TV Tokyo and Union Motion Picture. Shunsuke Kikuchi wrote the music for the show, and Saigō sang the theme songs.

The series has been rebroadcast many times. The first series of Abare Hasshū Goyō Tabi is available on DVD. The Jidaigeki Channel distributed it via satellite and cable in September 2008.

The production was in color. Episodes lasted 45 minutes within the time slot. TV Tokyo regularly broadcasts jidaigeki in the Friday 9:00–9:54 time slot.

== Cast ==
- Teruhiko Saigō as Tōdō Heihachirō
- Raita Ryū as Tetsunosuke Yamazaki
- Yōko Natsuki as Sayuri
- Miyuki Kanō
- Junichi Nitta
- Reiko Takashima
- Umenosuke Nakamura as Mizuno Tadakuni
- Yoshiko Kinohara
- Rika Miura
