= Crossroads (1928 film) =

1928 Japanese film

Jūjiro
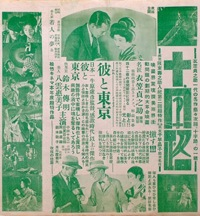
- Japanese movie poster
- Directed by: Teinosuke Kinugasa
- Written by: Teinosuke Kinugasa
- Starring: Akiko Chihaya; Toshinosuke Bando; Yukiko Ogawa
- Cinematography: Kōhei Sugiyama
- Production companies: Kinugasa Film Association; Shochiku (Kyoto studios)
- Distributed by: Shochiku
- Release date: 11 May 1928 (Japan)
- Running time: 88 minutes
- Country: Japan
- Language: Japanese (intertitles)

Crossroads (Japanese: 十字路, Hepburn: Jūjiro), also known as Crossways, Shadows of the Yoshiwara or Slums of Tokyo, is a 1928 silent Japanese drama film directed by Teinosuke Kinugasa. It is believed to be the first or one of the first Japanese films to be screened in Europe, and often mentioned in conjunction with Kinugasa's other avant-garde film, the two years earlier A Page of Madness.

== Plot ==
A young man is obsessed with courtesan O-ume, but she refuses to meet him anymore, finding him too persistent. During a fight, the young man seemingly kills his rival, and is himself blinded. He hides in the flat which he shares with his sister, not knowing that the rival's death was only staged. A man approaches the sister, pretending to be a policeman who can help her to clear her brother from the charges with money. Also, a doctor whom the sister consults declares that her brother's eyes can be cured, but only if she can pay him. To collect the money, she offers herself as a prostitute to a procuress. When the alleged policeman attempts to rape the sister, she stabs him. Meanwhile, the brother has regained his eyesight on his own, goes to O-umes house and dies under her window, foaming from the mouth and ridiculed by O-ume and his rival. The last scene shows the sister standing at a crossway, calling in vain for her brother.

== Cast ==
- Akiko Chihaya as the sister
- Junosuke Bando as the brother
- Yukiko Ogawa as O-ume, the courtesan
- Minoru Takase as the policeman (as Ippei Sōma)
- Misao Seki as the landlord
- Yoshie Nakagawa as the procuress
- Teruko Nijō as the wrong woman
- Keinosuke Sawada as the rival (as Myoichiro Ozawa)

== Release history ==
Crossroads was released in Japan on 11 May 1928. It was first screened in London on 26 January 1930 as Crossways and shown in New York in July of the same year as Slums of Tokyo. While favourably received by critics in Berlin and Paris, the New York Times critic stated, the film "possesses the virtue of sincerity but its tempo is too heavy". In later years, film historians repeatedly commented on the influence of the German expressionist film on Crossroads, in particular the works of Fritz Lang.

== Legacy ==
Crossroads was screened at the Berkeley Art Museum and Pacific Film Archive in 1983, at the International Film Festival Rotterdam in 2000, at the San Francisco Silent Film Festival in 2008 and at the Berlin International Film Festival in 2014. The British Film Institute listed Crossroads as the best Japanese film of 1928, describing it as a "complex psychological drama" that challenged the conventions of jidaigeki period films.
