= Kojiro Hongo =

Japanese actor (1938–2013)

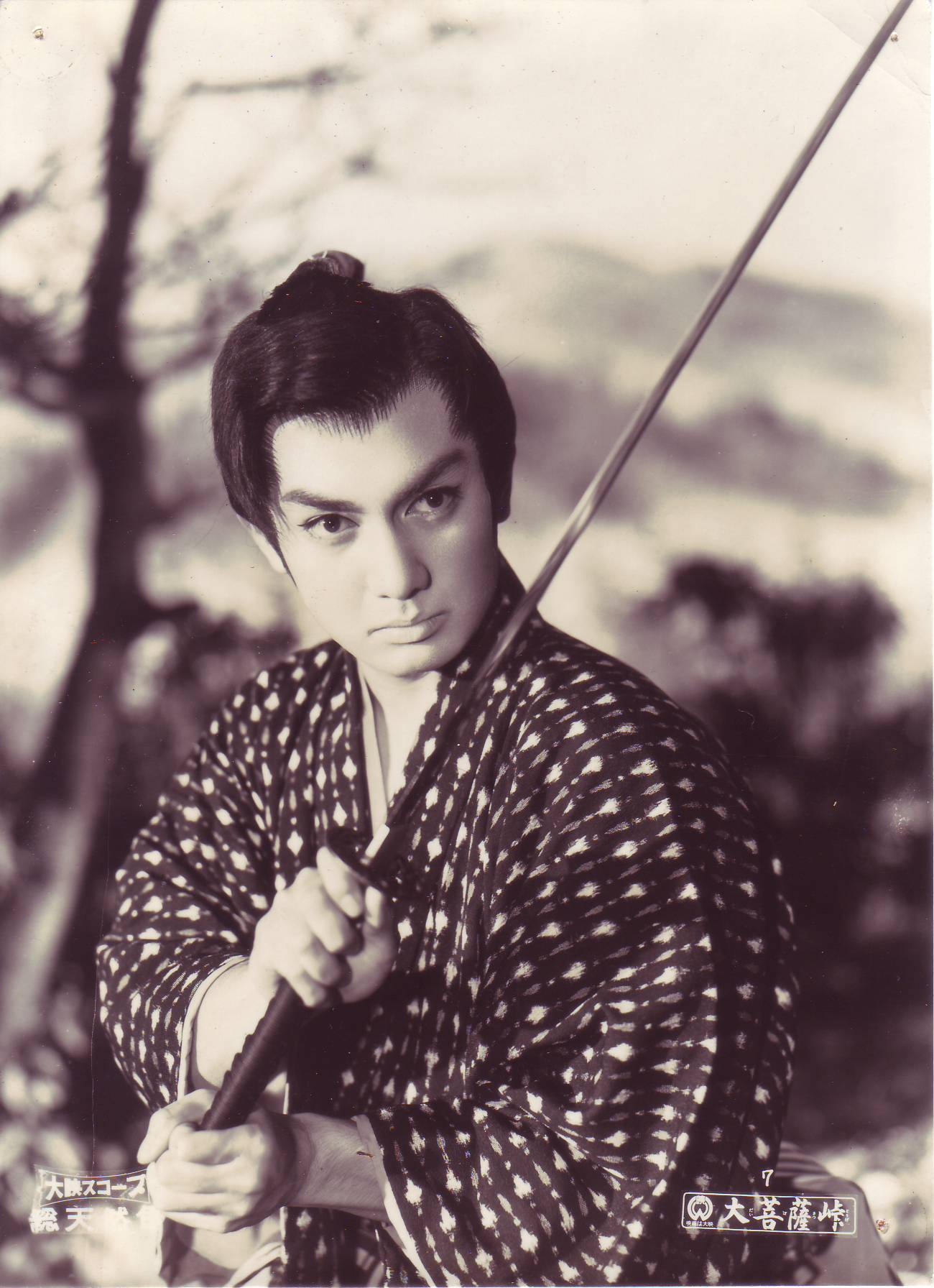
- Hongo in Daibosatsu-toge, 1960
- Born: 15 February 1938; Okayama, Japan
- Died: 14 February 2013 (aged 74); Yokohama, Japan
- Occupation: Actor
- Years active: 1959–2001

Kojiro Hongo (本郷功次郎, Hongō Kōjirō; 15 February 1938 – 14 February 2013) was a Japanese actor. Hongo won an Elan d'or Award for Newcomer of the Year in 1959. His notable international performances were in the Daiei Studios Gamera films.

== Selected filmography ==
=== Film ===
- Geo Tree (1959)
- The Demon of Mount Oe (1960)
- Satan's Sword (1960)
- Satan's Sword II (1960)
- Buddha (1960)
- Satan's Sword 3 (1961)
- The Whale God (1962)
- The Great Wall (1962)
- Zero Fighters (1965)
- Gamera vs. Barugon (1966)
- Return of Daimajin (1966)
- Gamera vs. Gyaos (1967)
- The Woman Gambler (1967)
- Gamera vs. Viras (1968)
- Peony Lantern (1968)
- Yokai Monsters: Along with Ghosts (1969)
- Hiken yaburi (1969)
- Lady Sazen and the Drenched Swallow Sword (1969)
- The Falcon Fighters (1969)
- The Haunted Castle (1969)
- Gateway to Glory (1970)
- Karate for Life (1977)
- Gamera: Guardian of the Universe (1995)
- Tokyo Mafia (1995)
- Tokyo Mafia: Wrath of the Yakuza (1996)
- EM Embalming (1999)
- Family (2001)
- Family 2 (2001)

=== Television ===
- Tokusō Saizensen (1977–87)
- Takeda Shingen (1988), Amari Torayasu
- Nobunaga: King of Zipangu (1992), Sakuma Morishige
- Homura Tatsu (1993), Hōjō Tokimasa
