= Kazuo Mori =

Japanese film director (1911–1989)

- 森 一生
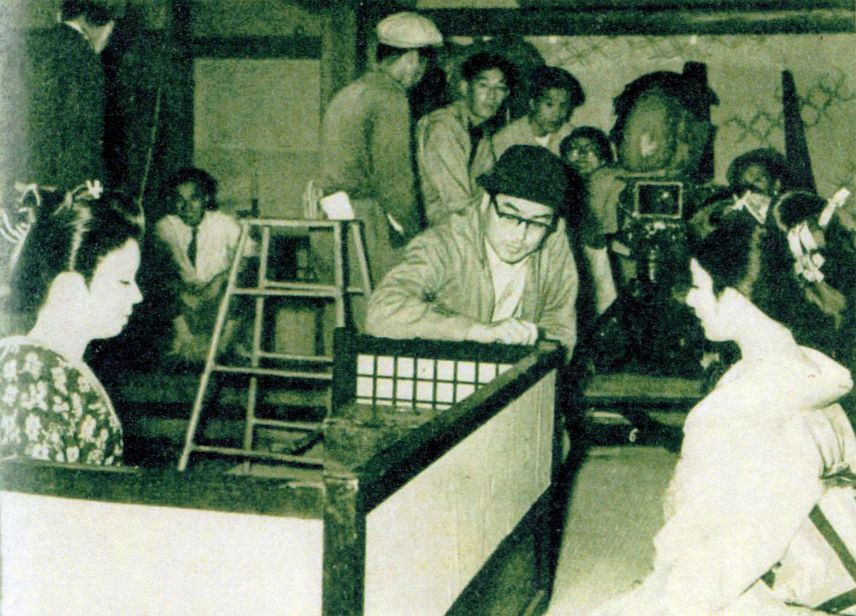
- Mori (center) on the set for Tōjūrō no koi (1955)
- Born: January 15, 1911; Matsuyama, Ehime, Japan
- Died: June 29, 1989 (aged 78)
- Occupation: Film director
- Years active: 1936–1970

Kazuo Mori (森 一生, Mori Kazuo; January 15, 1911 – June 29, 1989), also known by his street name Issei Mori (もり いっせい, Mori Issei), was a Japanese film director who primarily worked in popular genres like the jidaigeki. Mori directed over 100 films in his life.

== Career ==
Born in Ehime Prefecture, Mori graduated from Kyoto University before joining Nikkatsu's Uzumasa studio in 1933. A favorite of the producer Masaichi Nagata, he followed him to Daiichi Eiga and Shinkō Kinema before getting a chance to direct in 1936 with Adauchi hizakurige. When Shinkō Kinema was merged with other studios to form Daiei Film, Mori became one of Daiei's core directors of genre films, making primarily samurai films with stars such as Raizō Ichikawa, Kazuo Hasegawa, and Shintaro Katsu. While not an auteur, he was a solid craftsman in the genre. After Daiei went bankrupt in the early 1970s, Mori continued directing jidaigeki on television. He directed over 130 films in his career. The National Film Center in Tokyo did a retrospective of his works in 2011 in celebration of his centenary.

== Selected filmography ==
Title	Release date	Notes
Adauchi hizakurige 仇討膝栗毛	1936	
Vendetta for a Samurai 荒木又右衛門 決闘鍵屋の辻; Araki Mataemon: Kettō kagiya no Tsuji	1952	
Tōjūrō no Koi 藤十郎の恋	1955	
Fighting Fire Fighter あばれ鳶; Abare Tori	1956	
Zenigata Heiji: Human-skin Spider 銭形平次捕物控 人肌蜘蛛; Zenigata Heiji Torimono no Hikae: Hitohada Gumo	1956	
Suzakumon 朱雀門	1957	
Yatarō gasa 弥太郎笠	1957	
Inazuma Kaidō 稲妻街道	1957	
Suzunosuke Akado: The Birdman with Three Eyes 赤胴鈴之助 三つ目の鳥人; Akadо̄ Suzunosuke: Mitsume no chо̄jin	1958	
The 7th Secret Courier for Edo 七番目の密使; Nanabanme no Misshi	1958	
Hitohada Kujaku 人肌孔雀	1958	
Samurai Vendetta 薄桜記; Hakuōki	1959	
Wakakihi no Nobunaga 若き日の信長; Hakuōki	1959	
Blind Menace 不知火検校; Shiranui Kengyō	1959	
Kaze to Kumo to Toride 風と雲と砦 '	1961	
The Tale of Zatoichi Continues 続・座頭市物語; Zoku Zatoichi Monogatari	1962	
Shinobi no Mono 3: Resurrection 新・忍びの者; Shin Shinobi no Mono	1963	
Zatoichi and the Doomed Man 座頭市逆手斬り; Zatōichi sakate-giri	1965	
Majin Strikes Again 大魔神逆襲; Daimajin Gyakushu	1966	
A Certain Killer ある殺し屋; Aru Koroshiya	1967	
A Killer's Key ある殺し屋の鍵; Aru Koroshiya no Kagi	1967	
The Saga of Tanegashima 鉄砲伝来記; Teppo Denraiki	1967	
Nemuri Kyōshirō: Engetsu Sappō 眠狂四郎円月殺法	1969	
The Yoshiwara Story 秘録おんな蔵; Hiroku Onnagura	1969	
Kantō Onna Akumyō 関東おんな悪名	1969	
Zatoichi at Large 座頭市御用旅; Zatoichi Goyōtabi	1972	

=== Television ===
Title	Release date	Notes
Sengoku Rokku Hagurekiba 戦国ロックはぐれ牙	1973	
Zatoichi Monogatari 座頭市物語	1974	
Tsūkai! Kōchiyama Sōshun 痛快!河内山宗俊	1975-76	ep4 and 11
Kogarashi Monjirō 新・木枯し紋次郎	1977-78	

== Bibliography ==
- Mori, Kazuo; Kōichi Yamada; Sadao Yamane (1989). Mori Kazuo eigatabi. Tokyo: Sōshisha. ISBN 4-7942-0353-5. OCLC 21671930.
