= Yagyū Ren'yasai: Hidentsuki Kageshō =

Yagyū Renyasai: Hidentsuki Kageshō
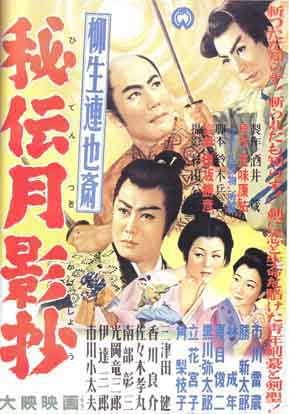
- Japanese movie poster
- Directed by: Katsuhiko Tasaka
- Written by: Hyōgo Suzuki (screenplay); Kosuke Gomi (novel)
- Starring: Raizo Ichikawa; Shintaro Katsu; Yataro Kurokawa; Ryosuke Kagawa
- Cinematography: Kōhei Sugiyama
- Music by: Seiichi Suzuki
- Production company: Daiei Film
- Distributed by: Daiei Film
- Release date: February 26, 1956 (Japan)
- Running time: 83 minutes
- Country: Japan
- Language: Japanese

Yagyū Ren'yasai: Hidentsuki Kageshō (Japanese: 柳生連也斎 秘伝月影抄; lit. The Ren'yasai Yagyu Hidden Story), also known as Hidden Story of the Yagyu Clan, is a 1956 black-and-white Japanese film directed by Katsuhiko Tasaka. It is a jidaigeki action drama set in the Edo period.

== Cast ==
- Raizo Ichikawa
- Shintaro Katsu
- Yataro Kurokawa
- Ryosuke Kagawa
