= Yōko Natsuki =

Japanese actress (born 1952)

- 夏樹 陽子
- Born: 24 October 1952 (age 73); Mie, Japan
- Occupation: Actress
- Years active: 1977–present
- Height: 1.68 m (5 ft 6 in)

Yōko Natsuki (夏樹 陽子, Natsuki Yōko) is an actress, born 24 October 1952 in Ise, Mie Prefecture, Japan. She started her career in the 1977 movie Karate for Life. One of her television roles was as Osono, a ninja in the jidaigeki series Yoshimune Hyōbanki: Abarenbō Shōgun. She also regularly appeared in Abare Hasshū Goyō Tabi.

== Filmography ==
=== Film ===
- Karate for Life (1977) – Reiko
- New Female Convict Scorpion Special: Block X (1977) – Nami Matsushima
- The Fall of Ako Castle (1978) – Osen
- Family (2001)
- Family 2 (2001)
- Hakodate Coffee (2016)

=== Television ===
- Shiroi Kyotō (1978) – Kanako
- Abarenbō Shōgun III (1990) – Osono
- Abare Hasshū Goyō Tabi (season1-3)
- Massan (2014) – Kayo Tanaka

== Awards ==
Year	Award	Category	Work(s)	Result
1978	2nd Elan d'or Awards	Newcomer of the Year	Herself	Won
