= Eiko Yanami =

Japanese actress (1948–2017)

Eiko Yanami (八並 映子, Yanami Eiko; October 22, 1948 – January 14, 2017) was a Japanese actress who performed in movies such as Gamera vs. Zigra and Female Convict Scorpion: Jailhouse 41.
