= Flowery Hood 2 =

- Film poster
- Directed by: Katsuhiko Tasaka
- Screenplay by: Minoru Inuzuka
- Story by: Genzō Murakami
- Produced by: Kazuyoshi Takeda
- Starring: Ichikawa Raizō VIII; Shintaro Katsu
- Cinematography: Senkichirō Takeda
- Music by: Urato Watanabe
- Distributed by: Daiei Film
- Release date: November 7, 1956 (Japan)
- Running time: 79 minutes
- Country: Japan
- Language: Japanese

Flowery Hood 2 (Japanese: 続花頭巾, Hepburn: Zoku Hana Zukin) (aka Hana Zukin II) is a 1956 black and white Japanese film directed by Katsuhiko Tasaka.

== Cast ==
- Ichikawa Raizō VIII
- Shintaro Katsu
