= A Fantastic Tale of Naruto =

- Japanese movie poster
- Directed by: Teinosuke Kinugasa
- Distributed by: Daiei Film
- Release date: 29 September 1957 (Japan)
- Running time: 101 minutes
- Country: Japan
- Language: Japanese

A Fantastic Tale of Naruto (Japanese: 鳴門秘帖, Hepburn: Naruto Hichō), also known as Secret of Naruto, is a 1957 Japanese film directed by Teinosuke Kinugasa. It is set in Awa Province (Tokushima).

== Plot ==
From the pen of Eiji Yoshikawa comes this exciting story. The Naruto Strait separates Tokushima from the islands of Awaji and Honshu. On Tokushima the mad lord dreams of conquest and forges a bloody revolt against the Tokugawa shogunate. A mysterious swordsman named Noriyuki Gennojo has crossed Naruto's waters to uncover the Awa clan's secrets.

He puts his life on the line after finding a testament of Awa's secrets, written in blood by a dying man. Joining Noriyuki is a female ninja who loves him, and the beautiful daughter of an enemy who's sworn to kill him. Awa's defenders will stop at nothing to prevent the blood-soaked letter from reaching the shogun.

== Cast ==
- Kazuo Hasegawa
- Raizo Ichikawa
- Fujiko Yamamoto
- Ryosuke Kagawa
- Saburo Date
- Osamu Takizawa
