= Fighting Fire Fighter =

- Film poster
- Directed by: Kazuo Mori
- Written by: Toshio Yasumi
- Produced by: Kazuyoshi Takeda
- Starring: Ichikawa Raizō VIII; Michiko Saga; Tamao Nakamura; Saburo Date
- Cinematography: Shozo Honda
- Music by: Seiichi Suzuki
- Distributed by: Daiei Film
- Release date: 12 December 1956 (Japan)
- Running time: 89 minutes
- Country: Japan
- Language: Japanese

Fighting Fire Fighter (Japanese: あばれ鳶, Hepburn: Abare Tobi) is a 1956 black-and-white Japanese film directed by Kazuo Mori.

== Cast ==
- Ichikawa Raizō VIII
- Michiko Saga
- Tamao Nakamura
- Saburo Date
