= Satan's Sword =

- Theatrical release poster
- Directed by: Kenji Misumi
- Written by: Teinosuke Kinugasa
- Produced by: Masaichi Nagata
- Starring: Raizō Ichikawa; Kojiro Hongo; Tamao Nakamura; Fujiko Yamamoto; Shōgo Shimada
- Cinematography: Hiroshi Imai
- Edited by: Kanji Suganuma
- Music by: Seiichi Suzuki
- Production company: Daiei Film
- Distributed by: Daiei Film
- Release date: 18 October 1960 (Japan)
- Running time: 106 minutes
- Country: Japan
- Language: Japanese

Satan's Sword (Japanese: 大菩薩峠, Hepburn: Daibosatsu Tōge; "Great Buddha Pass" or "Daibosatsu Pass, Part I") is a 1960 Japanese samurai film directed by Kenji Misumi, written by Teinosuke Kinugasa, and produced by Masaichi Nagata. The film stars Raizō Ichikawa as samurai Ryunosuke Tsukue, alongside Kojiro Hongo, Tamao Nakamura, Fujiko Yamamoto, Kenji Sugawara, and Jun Negami, and was followed by two sequels.

== Cast ==
- Raizō Ichikawa as Ryunosuke Tsukue
- Kojiro Hongo as Hyoma Utsugi
- Tamao Nakamura as Ohama / Otoyo
- Fujiko Yamamoto as Omatsu
- Kenji Sugawara as Isami Kondō
- Jun Negami as Kamo Serizawa
- Toshiro Chiba as Toshizō Hijikata
- Saburo Niwamata as Bunnojo Utsugi
- Shōgo Shimada as Toranosuke Shimada

== See also ==
- Dai-bosatsu tōge (1957), starring Chiezō Kataoka
- The Sword of Doom (1966), starring Tatsuya Nakadai
