= The Magical Warrior =

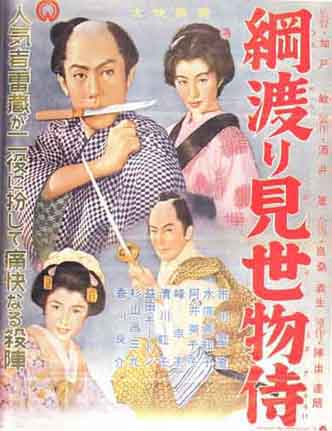
- Japanese movie poster
- Directed by: Bin Kato
- Starring: Ichikawa Raizō VIII; Machiko Mizuhara; Michiko Ai
- Production company: Daiei Film
- Release date: September 6, 1955 (Japan)
- Running time: 83 minutes
- Country: Japan
- Language: Japanese

The Magical Warrior (Japanese: 綱渡り見世物侍, Hepburn: Tsuna Watari Misemono Zamurai) is a 1955 black-and-white Japanese film directed by Bin Kato.

== Cast ==
- Ichikawa Raizō VIII
- Machiko Mizuhara
- Michiko Ai
