= Fujiko Yamamoto =

Japanese actress (born 1931)

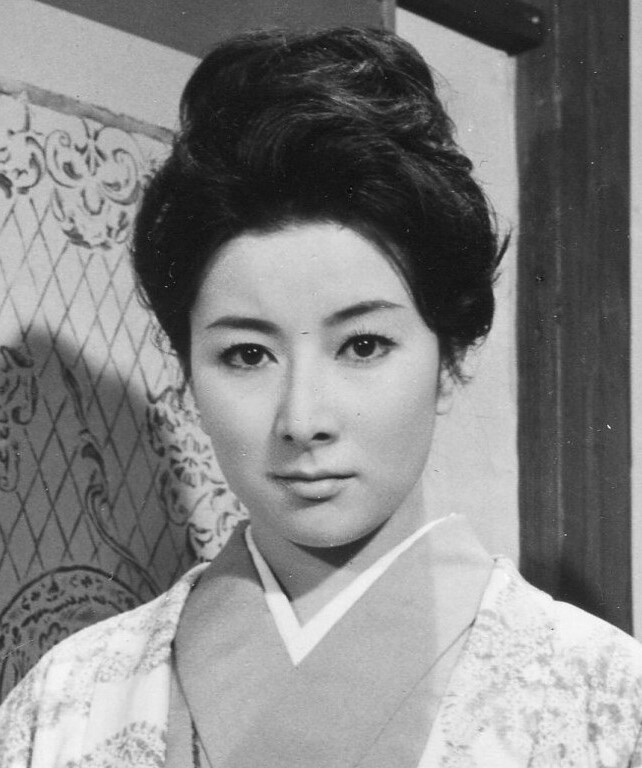
- Yamamoto in 1962
- Born: 11 December 1931 (age 94); Osaka, Japan
- Occupation: Actress
- Years active: 1953–present

Fujiko Yamamoto (山本富士子, Yamamoto Fujiko) (born 11 December 1931) is a Japanese stage, film and television actress. She was the winner of the first Miss Nippon Grand Prix in 1950, and appeared in over 100 films between 1953 and 1963, including works by directors Yasujirō Ozu, Kon Ichikawa, Shirō Toyoda and Kōzaburō Yoshimura.

== Career ==
Yamamoto was born on 11 December 1931 in Nishi ward, Osaka, and graduated from Kyoto Prefectural First High School for Girls (now Kyoto Prefectural Ohki High School). She won the first Miss Nippon beauty contest in 1950. In 1953, she made her film debut at Daiei Film, and became one of the studio's top actresses.

Yamamoto was considered one of Japan's most beautiful women, with, in the words of film historian Catherine Russell, "noble" features that represented the classic ideal of Japanese beauty. As such, she was well-suited for costumed parts in the era's popular period dramas, with her less-frequent modern roles (in films like Ozu's Equinox Flower and Ichikawa's Being Two Isn't Easy) often shot in "movie star" closeups that placed her apart from the films' contemporary storytelling.

In 1963, when her contract came up for renewal, she insisted on changes. The head of Daiei, Masaichi Nagata, refused, dismissed her, and prevented her from finding work at other film studios via the Five-Company Agreement. Pressure was even put on theatre companies, but could not reach television. After the Daiei dismissal, Yamamoto acted in the TV series Toshiba Sunday Theatre and on Fuji TV, and appeared on stage alongside Matsumoto Kōshirō in 1964. Even though she has appeared frequently on stage and on television, she has not appeared in a film since then.

== Selected filmography ==
- Jūdai no yūwaku (1953)
- The Romance of Yushima (1955)
- A Girl Isn't Allowed to Love (1955)
- Night River (1956)
- Suzakumon (1957)
- Equinox Flower (1958)
- Hitohada Kujaku (1958)
- The Loyal 47 Ronin (1958)
- The Snowy Heron (1958)
- Unforgettable Trail (1959)
- Satan's Sword (1960)
- The Demon of Mount Oe (1960)
- The Twilight Story (1960)
- A Woman's Testament (1960)
- Hunting Rifle (1961)
- Ten Dark Women (1961)
- The Great Wall (1962)
- Being Two Isn't Easy (1962)
- An Actor's Revenge (1963)

== Awards ==
- 1958 Blue Ribbon Award for Best Actress (for Equinox Flower and The Snowy Heron)
- 1960 Kinema Junpo Award for Best Actress (for The Twilight Story and A Woman's Testament)
