= Migratory Birds of the Flowers =

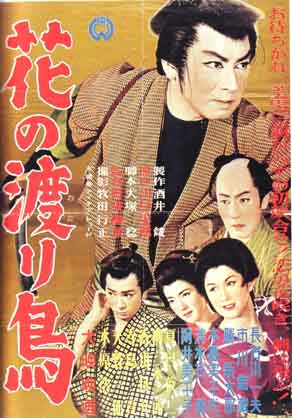
- Japanese movie poster
- Directed by: Katsuhiko Tasaka
- Screenplay by: Minoru Inuzuka
- Story by: Matsutarō Kawaguchi
- Produced by: Shin Sakai
- Starring: Kazuo Hasegawa; Ichikawa Raizō VIII; Shintaro Katsu; Kaoru Shimizudani; Michiko Ai
- Cinematography: Yukimasa Makita
- Music by: Urato Watanabe
- Production company: Daiei Film
- Release date: 3 January 1956 (Japan)
- Running time: 80 minutes
- Country: Japan
- Language: Japanese

Migratory Birds of the Flowers (Japanese: 花の渡り鳥, Hepburn: Hana no Wataridori), also known as Racket and Love, is a 1956 Japanese film directed by Katsuhiko Tasaka.

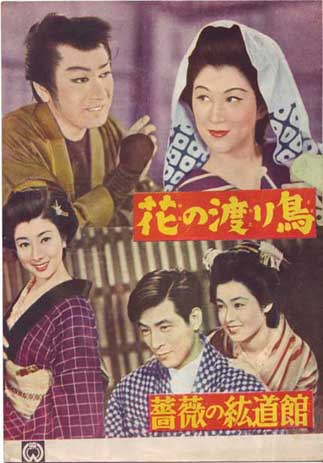
Japanese movie poster

== Cast ==
- Kazuo Hasegawa
- Ichikawa Raizō VIII
- Shintaro Katsu
- Kaoru Shimizudani
- Michiko Ai
