= The Demon of Mount Oe =

- Theatrical release poster

Japanese name
- Kanji: 大江山酒天童子
Transcriptions
- Revised Hepburn: Ōeyama Shuten Dōji
- Directed by: Tokuzō Tanaka
- Screenplay by: Fuji Yahiro
- Based on: Ōeyama Shuten Dōji by Matsutarō Kawaguchi
- Produced by: Masaichi Nagata; Akinari Suzuki
- Starring: Kazuo Hasegawa; Ichikawa Raizō VIII; Shintaro Katsu
- Cinematography: Hiroshi Imai
- Edited by: Kanji Suganuma
- Music by: Ichirō Saitō
- Production company: Daiei Film
- Distributed by: Daiei
- Release date: April 27, 1960 (Japan)
- Running time: 114 minutes
- Country: Japan
- Language: Japanese

The Demon of Mount Oe (Japanese: 大江山酒天童子, Hepburn: Ōeyama Shuten Dōji; lit. 'Shuten Doji of Mount Oe') is a 1960 Japanese horror film directed by Tokuzō Tanaka and produced by Daiei Film. The film is about Samurai warriors joining forces to defeat a shape-changing supernatural creature.

== Cast ==
- Kazuo Hasegawa as Bizennosuke Tachibana no Tomotada
- Kojiro Hongo as Sakata no Kintoki
- Ichikawa Raizō VIII as Minamoto-no-Yorimitsu
- Shintaro Katsu as Watanabe no Tsuna
- Jun Tazaki as Hakamadare no Yasusuke
- Kichijiro Ueda as Arakuma no Taro
- Eitaro Ozawa as Fujiwara no Michinaga
- Sachiko Hidari as Ibaragi Doji
- Fujiko Yamamoto as Nagisa no Mae
- Tamao Nakamura as Kotsuma
- Jun Negami as Hirai no Yasumasa
- Nakamura Ganjirō II as Yamato no Kami
- Saburo Date as Omi no Kuro
- Naritoshi Hayashi as Urabe no Suetake
- Atsuko Kindaichi as Princess Katsura
- Ichiro Izawa as Umanosuke
- Ryuzo Shimada as Usui no Sadamitsu
- Sonosuke Sawamura as Tsuchigumo Jinnai
- Shintaro Nanjo as Harima no Kami

== Release ==
The Demon of Mount Oe was released in Japan on April 27, 1960. The film was released on VHS in Japan by Daiei on December 12, 1997 and was released on DVD by Kadokawa Shoten on January 24, 2014. Radiance Films released a 4K restoration on Blu-ray as part of the second volume of their Daiei Gothic collection.
