= Thief and Magistrate =

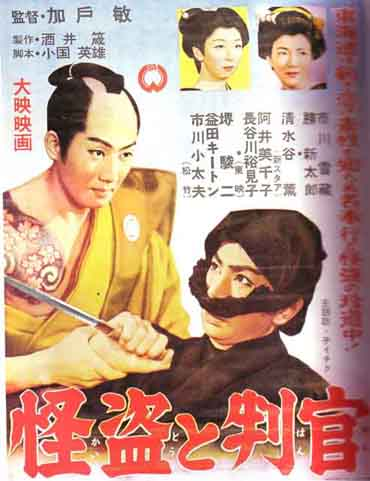
- Japanese movie poster
- Directed by: Bin Kato
- Starring: Ichikawa Raizō VIII; Shintaro Katsu
- Production company: Daiei Film
- Release date: December 7, 1955 (Japan)
- Running time: 87 minutes
- Country: Japan
- Language: Japanese

Thief and Magistrate (Japanese: 怪盗と判官, Hepburn: Kaitō to Hangan) is a 1955 black-and-white Japanese film directed by Bin Kato.

== Cast ==
- Ichikawa Raizō VIII as Tōyama no Kin-san
- Shintaro Katsu as Nezumi Kozō
