= The Snowy Heron =

1958 film

- Directed by: Teinosuke Kinugasa
- Written by: Kyōka Izumi; Teinosuke Kinugasa
- Produced by: Masaichi Nagata
- Starring: Fujiko Yamamoto
- Cinematography: Kimio Watanabe
- Release date: 29 November 1958
- Running time: 97 minutes
- Country: Japan
- Language: Japanese

The Snowy Heron (白鷺, Shirasagi) is a 1958 Japanese film directed by Teinosuke Kinugasa. It was entered into the 1959 Cannes Film Festival.

== Cast ==
- Fujiko Yamamoto as Oshino
- Keizo Kawasaki as Junichi Inaki
- Yosuke Irie as Takashi Irie
- Shūji Sano as Kumajirō Gosaka
- Hitomi Nozoe as Nanae Date
- Hideo Takamatsu as Yokichi Tatsumi
- Eijirō Tono
- Tamae Kiyokawa as Hideko Gosaka
- Rieko Sumi as Wakakichi
