= Gamera vs. Zigra =

1971 film by Noriaki Yuasa

- Japanese theatrical release poster

Japanese name
- Kanji: ガメラ対深海怪獣ジグラ
Transcriptions
- Revised Hepburn: Gamera tai Shinkai Kaijū Jigura
- Directed by: Noriaki Yuasa
- Screenplay by: Niisan Takahashi
- Produced by: Yoshihiko Manabe; Hidemasa Nagata
- Starring: Eiko Yanami; Reiko Kasahara; Mikiko Tsubouchi; Kōji Fujiyama; Yasushi Sakagami; Gloria Zoellner; Arlene Zoellner
- Cinematography: Akira Uehara
- Edited by: Yoshiyuki Miyazaki
- Music by: Shunsuke Kikuchi
- Production company: Daiei Film
- Distributed by: Dainichi Eihai
- Release date: 17 July 1971 (Japan)
- Running time: 87 minutes
- Country: Japan
- Language: Japanese
- Budget: ¥35 million

Gamera vs. Zigra (ガメラ対深海怪獣ジグラ, Gamera tai Shinkai Kaijū Jigura; lit. 'Gamera vs. Deep-Sea Monster Zigra') is a 1971 Japanese kaiju film directed by Noriaki Yuasa, written by Niisan Takahashi, and produced by Yoshihiko Manabe and Hidemasa Nagata. It is the seventh entry in the Gamera film series, after Gamera vs. Jiger, which was released the previous year. Gamera vs. Zigra stars Eiko Yanami, Reiko Kasahara, Mikiko Tsubouchi, and Kōji Fujiyama, and features the fictional giant monsters Gamera and Zigra. It was a tie-in film with the aquarium Kamogawa Sea World which was founded in the previous year.

Shortly after Gamera vs. Zigra was completed, the film's production studio, Daiei Film, went bankrupt. As a result, the film was distributed by Dainichi Eihai, receiving a theatrical release in Japan on July 17, 1971. The film was not released theatrically in the United States, instead being released directly to American television by King Features Entertainment in 1987.

== Plot ==
Without warning, an alien spaceship attacks a Japanese Moon base. Back on Earth, young Kenichi (Kenny in the English dubbed version) Ishikawa, his father Dr. Yosuke (Henry in the English dubbed version) Ishikawa, his friend Helen Wallace and her father, Dr. Tom Wallace, witness the spaceship descending into the ocean. They go to investigate, but are soon captured by a teleportation beam that brings them aboard the spaceship. Inside the spaceship, a human-looking woman appears to them and reveals that she is of an alien race called the Zigrans. By way of demonstrating Zigran technological prowess, she creates a gigantic earthquake that wreaks havoc in Japan. She had previously caused two other earthquakes, one in Peru and the other in Arabia (in the English dubbed version, it mentions instead the Indian Ocean). She then tells her prisoners of the planet Zigra's history and its great scientific advances which, unfortunately, have resulted in its destruction; but in searching for a new home, Zigra has found Earth.

The woman contacts authorities on Earth and orders them to surrender, or she will kill her prisoners. Tom declares that the Zigran woman is insane and, in anger, she sends the two men into a hypnotic trance. Kenichi and Helen take action, successfully using the ship's control console to escape with their fathers. Enraged, Zigra orders the woman to go to Earth and kill the children. She says it would be simpler to kill all the people of Japan, but Zigra tells her that humans must be preserved so they can be used for food. Now Gamera, intent on discovering the identity of the alien interloper, flies in to save the day and rescues the children and their fathers. The U.N. authorities, after questioning Kenichi and Helen, resolve to attack Zigra. The Defense Force jets scramble, but the Zigran spaceship makes short work of them with its powerful lasers. The alien woman arrives on earth, disguised as a normal human, and begins her search for Kenichi and Helen. She hitches a ride with a Kamogawa Sea World dolphin trainer back to the facility, which the military is now using as its center of operations. She finds the two children, but before she can catch them, they run away from her.

Gamera begins an underwater assault on the Zigran spaceship, which transforms into a giant swordfish-like monster when hit by Gamera's flame breath. Zigra grows larger and larger and finally halts the heroic turtle with a ray that suspends his cell activity. Immobilized, Gamera sinks into the sea. Zigra then makes contact with the people of Earth, saying that they should give up and surrender all the seas to him. Back at Sea World, the dolphin trainer and the facility's scientists discover a way to break the alien's hypnotic control with sonic waves. Thus, they manage to disable the Zigran woman, only to learn that she is actually an Earthwoman named Chikako Sugawara (Lora Lee in the English dubbed version), who had been in a Moon rover during the initial lunar attack and was captured and used by Zigra. Drs. Wallace and Ishikawa employ a bathysphere in an attempt to wake Gamera, only to find that Kenichi and Helen have stowed away on board. Zigra suddenly attacks them and again demands the immediate surrender of Earth or he will destroy the bathysphere. The U.N. commander reluctantly agrees to the alien's terms.

An electrical storm approaches the bay and a couple of lightning bolts revive Gamera, who stealthily takes the bathysphere from the sea floor when Zigra is asleep and returns it to the surface. Gamera and Zigra face off a final time and Zigra, using his superior versatility underwater, slices Gamera's chest with his blade-like dorsal fin. Gamera takes hold of Zigra, flies into the air with him and then drops him at high speed, slamming the alien monster onto the land. Zigra stands up awkwardly on his tail fins in order to fight Gamera. Gamera further incapacitates Zigra by jamming a boulder through his nose, pinning him to the ground. Gamera grabs another boulder and uses it, like a mallet used to play a xylophone, to play the Gamera theme on Zigra's dorsal fins. Finally, Gamera kills Zigra by setting his body on fire with his flame breath, reducing the alien to ashes in a massive conflagration.

== Cast ==
- Eiko Yanami as Woman X / Chikako Sugawara
- Reiko Kasahara as Kiyoko Ishikawa
- Mikiko Tsubouchi as Mrs. Ishikawa
- Kōji Fujiyama as Tom Wallace
- Isamu Saeki as Dr. Yosuke Ishikawa
- Yasushi Sakagami as Kenichi Ishikawa
- Arlene Zoellner as Margie Wallace
- Gloria Zoellner as Helen Wallace
- Shin Minatsu as Ango Yamada
- Yoshio Yoshida as Niemon
- Shō Natsuki as Dr. Sawamoto
- Gorō Kudan as Defence Force commander
- Daigo Inoue as Defence Force adjutant
- Daihachi Kita as Shōsaku Ogawa
- Ken Nakahara and Daisaku Hara as Reporters
- Kōshirō Seki as Radar Operator
- Ryuji Inazuma as Assistant
- Kyōsuke Shiho as Fisherman
- Chie Kodama and Miki Wakō as Ama
- Sachie Yamana as Aqualium trainer
- Umenosuke Izumi as Gamera
- Keiichi Noda as Zigra (voice)

== Production ==
Gamera vs. Zigra had a budget of 35,000,000 yen, which was roughly $97,000. Shortly after the film was completed, its production company Daiei Film went bankrupt, leading it to be distributed by Dainichi Eihai.

== Release ==
Gamera vs. Zigra was released in Japan on 17 July 1971 as a double feature with the 1958 film Suzunosuke Akado: The Birdman with Three Eyes. The film was never released theatrically in the United States. It was released directly to television by King Features Entertainment in 1987.

The film was released on DVD by Shout! Factory on 15 March 2011 and blu-ray by Arrow Video in August 2020 in a box set compiling all the Gamera films.

== Reception ==
In a retrospective review, Slant Magazine noted the film's "slipshod construction (even by the standards of films featuring actors in rubber monster suits)" which "suggests less in the way of a thought-out film than a product cranked out so as to fulfill a McDonald’s Happy Meal toy contract." The review concluded that Gamera vs. Zigra "isn't nearly as much fun as it should be, but for those with a cheeky fondness for city-scale monster mashes, there are some fleeting pleasures."

== Themes and analysis ==
In their scholarly book Japan's Green Monsters: Environmental Commentary in Kaiju Cinema, Rhoads and McCorkle offer an ecocritical assessment of Gamera vs. Zigra. The scholars argue that viewing the film through the three lenses of Japanese environmental history, the monster genre, and the historical trends that had crippled the Japanese film industry provide a new understanding of the final installment in the original Gamera series. Rhoads and McCorkle argue that Gamera vs. Zigra possesses far deeper environmental appeals than the obvious ones present on the film's surface.

== See also ==
- List of Japanese films of 1971
