= Fighting Birds =

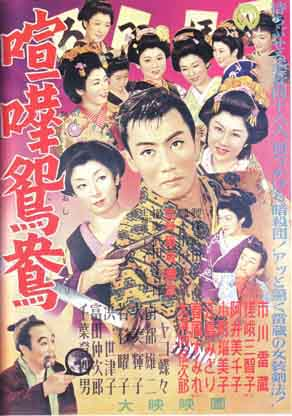
- Original film poster
- Directed by: Katsuhiko Tasaka
- Screenplay by: Hideo Oguni
- Produced by: Kazuyoshi Takeda
- Starring: Ichikawa Raizō VIII; Chocho Miyako; Koji Shimizu; Denjiro Okochi; Michiko Saga
- Cinematography: Senkichiro Takeda
- Music by: Yoshiji Nagatsu
- Backgrounds by: Akira Naitō
- Distributed by: Daiei Film
- Release date: 25 May 1956 (Japan)
- Running time: 82 minutes
- Country: Japan
- Language: Japanese

Fighting Birds (Japanese: 喧嘩鴛鴦, Hepburn: Kenka Oshidori) is a 1956 black-and-white Japanese drama film directed by Katsuhiko Tasaka.

== Plot ==
Shinhachiro Hoshina, who heads east with a letter from Jinzaemon, the uncle of the Tamba-Sasayama Aoyama feudal clan, is said to have forty-eight female misfortunes waiting for him from the easy-going head temple at Sanjo Ohashi. However, as expected, he was chased by Mitsue, the daughter of Jinzaemon, Akemi, the daughter of the elder, and Kei, the bird chasing woman. Around the same time, Namiji Ryokan of the Kampaku Takatsukasa family, who carried a secret letter to Yamato Mamoru Yagyu with Ometsuke, and the thug Anasawa gang of Kyoto Shoshidai Itakura, who followed this, headed east. Upon arriving in Kusatsu, Shinhachiro tried to save Namiji, who was chased by the Anasawa crew, but Namiji was stabbed and he was given a secret letter stating, "Arrive in Edo on March 4th." Shinhachiro approached Tsuchiyama and met the daughter of a textile wholesaler in Kyoto, Masakichi, an apprentice, but Masakichi clung to Shinhachiro in Yaba. And Kuwana, at Atami's voyage, clung to eleven girls in the storm, and at Atami's inn, a great service from seven maids, and moreover, Kakubei Shishi's younger brother who was mistaken for Takashi's princess. Shinhachiro was completely surprised at the journey of the woman's trouble, but arrived in Edo with a selfish victory, which is also good at pursuing Anasawa, and passed through the gate of Yamato Yagyu according to his uncle's letter. It was. However, Mamoru Yamato called himself Shinhachiro his younger brother and was stunned. I was even more surprised when I climbed the castle to worship the shogun. Isn't there Masakichi dressed as a princess? Shinhachiro learned for the first time that Masakichi was actually the princess of the Kampaku Takatsukasa family and had the mission of directly appealing to the lords who played the bad politics of Itakura, the chief priest. On the day of the eastward descent, Shinhachiro, who had fulfilled his direct appeal, and Shinhachiro, who was regrettable, were seen on the highway, looking forward to the day when they met again.

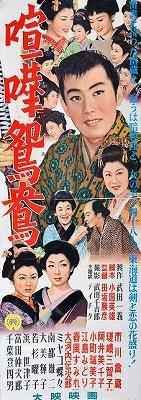
Japanese movie poster

== Cast ==
- Ichikawa Raizō VIII
- Chocho Miyako
- Koji Shimizu
- Denjiro Okochi
- Michiko Saga
- Tomiko Ishii
- Nakajiro Tomita
- Kanae Kobayashi
- Yuji Hamada
- Michiko Ai
- Keiko Koyanagi
