= The Romance of Yushima =

1955 Japanese film

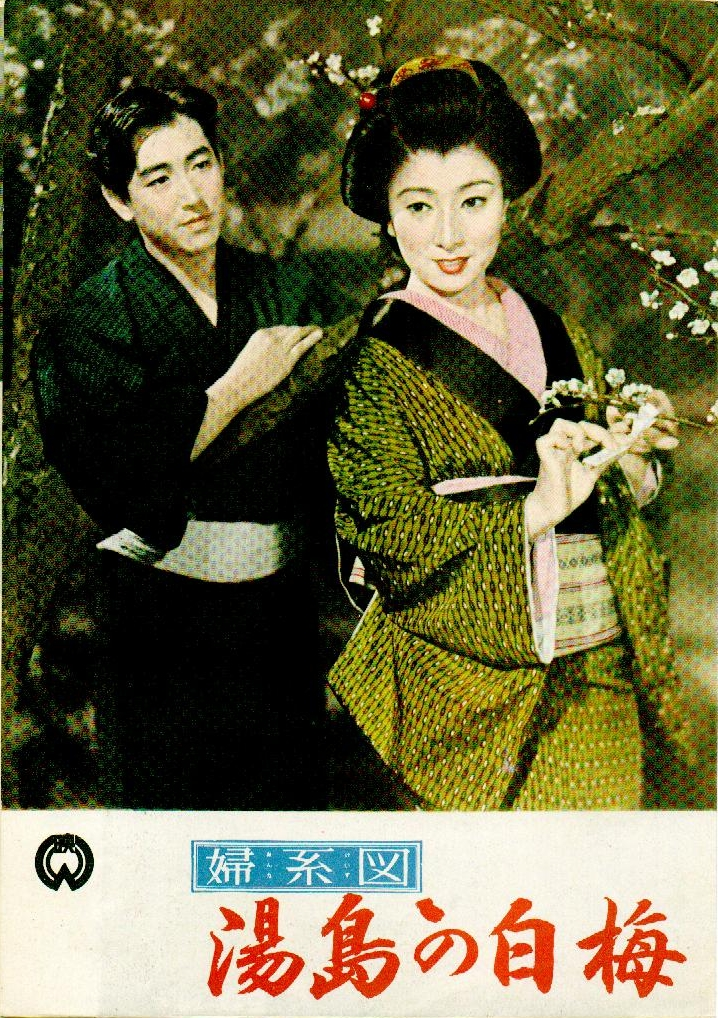
- Japanese movie poster
- Directed by: Teinosuke Kinugasa
- Written by: Teinosuke Kinugasa; Jun Sagara; Kyōka Izumi (novel)
- Produced by: Asata Fujii
- Cinematography: Kimio Watanabe
- Music by: Ichirō Saitō
- Production company: Daiei Film
- Release date: 28 September 1955 (Japan)
- Running time: 116 minutes
- Country: Japan
- Language: Japanese

The Romance of Yushima (婦系図 湯島の白梅, Onna keizu: Yushima no shiraume; lit. "Genealogy of women: White plums of Yushima) is a 1955 Japanese romance drama film directed by Teinosuke Kinugasa. It is based on the 1907 novel Onna keizu by Kyōka Izumi.

== Plot ==
The film follows the tragic love story between student Chikara and his mistress Otsuta, a geisha.

== Cast ==
- Fujiko Yamamoto as Otsuta
- Kōji Tsuruta as Chikara Hayase
- Masayuki Mori as Shunzo Sakai
- Sumiko Fujita as Taeko Sakai
- Yasuko Kawakami as Yukiko Matsumura
- Haruko Sugimura as Koyoshi
- Daisuke Katō as Menoso

== Background ==
Izumi's novel, first published in serialised form in 1907, became popular as a shinpa play the following year, which added the title giving Yushima (Note: A district in Bunkyō ward, Tokyo.) setting originally not contained in the book.

== TV version ==
A TV dramatisation was broadcast between Thursday 9 June and Thursday 16 June 1966, again starring Fujiko Yamamoto.
