= The 7th Secret Courier for Edo =

1958 film by Kazuo Mori

- Japanese movie poster
- Directed by: Kazuo Mori
- Written by: Hyōgo Suzuki
- Produced by: Shin Sakai
- Starring: Raizo Ichikawa; Michiko Ai; Tokiko Mita
- Cinematography: Kōhei Sugiyama
- Music by: Ichirō Saitō
- Distributed by: Daiei Film
- Release date: June 10, 1958 (Japan)
- Running time: 74 minutes
- Country: Japan
- Language: Japanese

The 7th Secret Courier for Edo (Japanese: 七番目の密使, Hepburn: Nanabanme no Misshi) is a 1958 Japanese black-and-white period drama (jidaigeki) film directed by Kazuo Mori.

== Cast ==
- Raizo Ichikawa as Ban Sakon
- Michiko Ai
- Tokiko Mita
