= Night River =

1956 Japanese film

- Film poster

Japanese name
- Kanji: 夜の河
- Directed by: Kōzaburō Yoshimura
- Written by: Sumie Tanaka; Hisao Sawano (novel)
- Produced by: Masaichi Nagata
- Starring: Fujiko Yamamoto; Ken Uehara; Eitarō Ozawa; Michiko Ai; Eijirō Tōno
- Cinematography: Kazuo Miyagawa
- Edited by: Shigeo Nishida
- Music by: Sei Ikeno; Kazuo Nakamoto
- Production company: Daiei Film
- Distributed by: Daiei Film
- Release date: 12 September 1956 (Japan)
- Running time: 104 minutes
- Country: Japan
- Language: Japanese

Night River (Japanese: 夜の河, Hepburn: Yoru no kawa), also titled Undercurrent or River of Night, is a 1956 Japanese drama film directed by Kōzaburō Yoshimura. It was Yoshimura's first film photographed in colour. The screenplay by Sumie Tanaka is based on a novel by Hisao Sawano.

== Plot ==
Kiwa Funaki is a young successful kimono designer working at her family's Kyoto-based business. While she fends off both the admiration of young painter Goro and the obtrusive advances of business partner Omiya, she eventually falls in love with scientist Takemura, who is writing a paper on the Shojobae fly. After she has started an affair with him, Kiwa learns that Takemura has a wife terminally ill with tuberculosis. When Takemura's wife finally dies, he proposes to her, but Kiwa, criticising him for his egotism, chooses her independence over the prospect of becoming his wife.

== Cast ==
- Fujiko Yamamoto as Kiwa Funaki
- Ken Uehara as Takemura
- Eitarō Ozawa as Omiya
- Michiko Ai as Setsuko
- Eijirō Tōno as Yūjirō, Kiwa's father
- Kazuko Ichikawa as Atsuko, Takemura's daughter
- Michiko Ono as Miyo, Kiwa's sister
- Kimiko Tachibana as Mitsu, Kiwa's stepmother
- Mineko Yorozuyo as Yasushi, Omiya's wife
- Keizo Kawasaki as Gora Okamoto

== Release history ==
Night River was released in Japan on 12 September 1956 and shown under the title Undercurrent at the 1957 New York Japanese Film Festival. It was released on DVD in Japan in 2007.

== Legacy ==
Night River was screened at a 2012 retrospective on Kaneto Shindō and Kōzaburō Yoshimura in London, organised by the British Film Institute and the Japan Foundation. Under the title Undercurrent, it was also the opening film at the retrospective "Kōzaburō Yoshimura: Tides of Emotion", honoring 13 of the director's films, that was organized at Film at Lincoln Center in New York City, December 5-11, 2025.

== Awards ==
- 1956 Mainichi Film Award for Best Supporting Actor (Eijirō Tōno for Night River and two other films) and Best Sound Recording (Yukio Kaihara for Night River and three other films)
