= Sisters of the Gion (1956 film) =

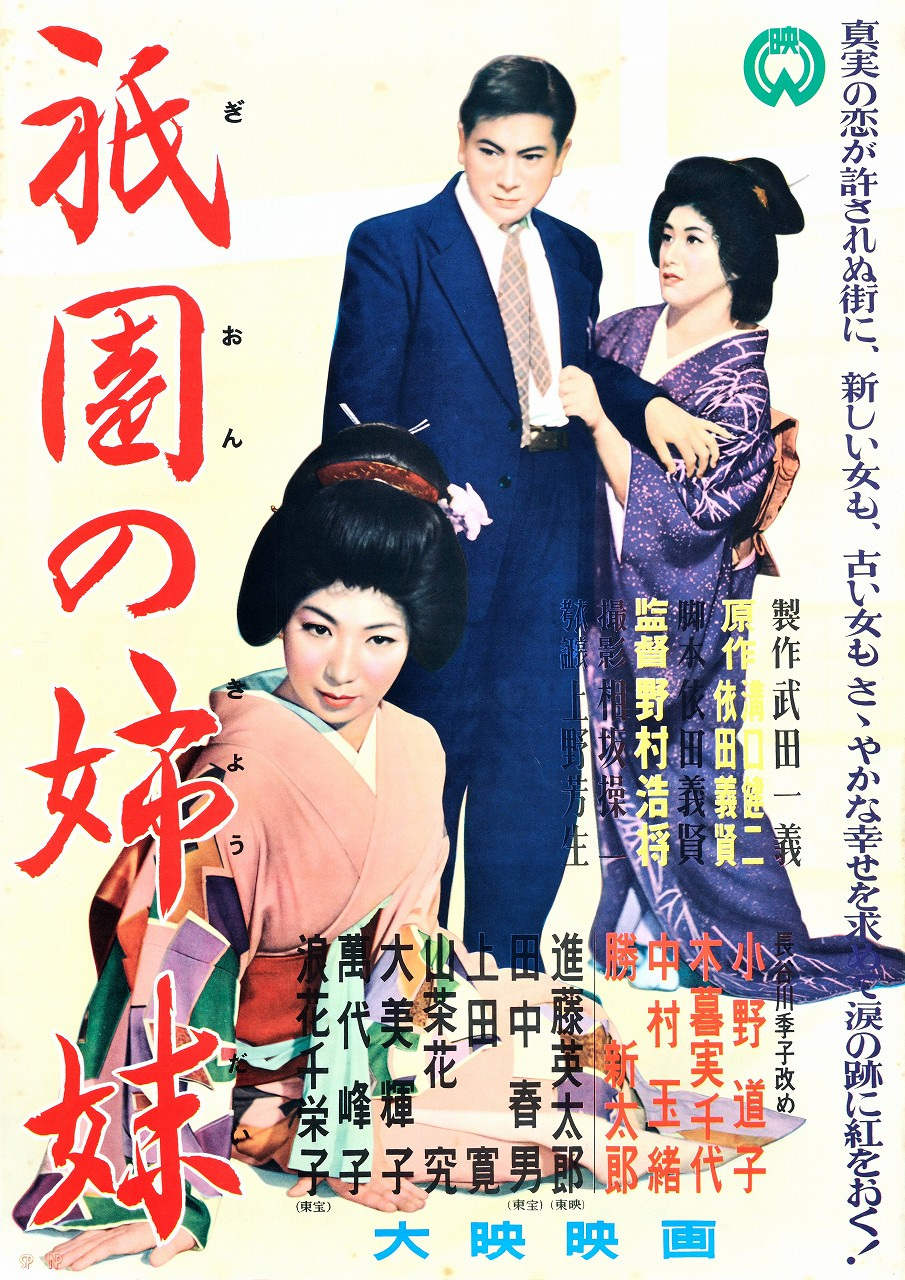
- Japanese movie poster
- Directed by: Hiromasa Nomura
- Produced by: Daiei Motion Picture Company
- Distributed by: Daiei Film
- Release date: May 18, 1956
- Running time: 91 minutes
- Country: Japan
- Language: Japanese

Sisters of the Gion (祇園の姉妹, Gion no kyōdai) is a 1956 black-and-white Japanese film drama directed by Hiromasa Nomura.

The film is a remake of the 1936 film drama of the same name Sisters of the Gion by Kenji Mizoguchi.

== Cast ==
- Michiyo Kogure
- Michiko Ono
- Tamao Nakamura
- Shintaro Katsu
- Haruo Tanaka

== See also ==
- Sisters of the Gion (祇園の姉妹 Gion no kyōdai), a 1936 film by Kenji Mizoguchi.
