= The Iroha Elegy =

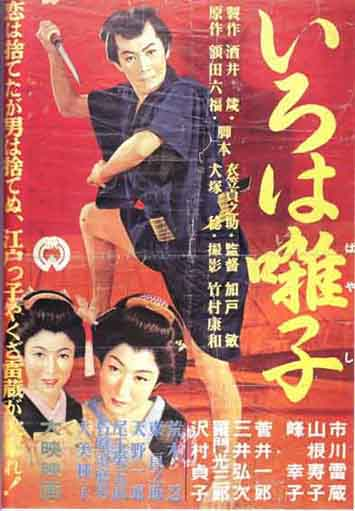
- Japanese movie poster
- Directed by: Bin Kato
- Starring: Ichikawa Raizō VIII; Hisako Yamane; Kōji Mitsui
- Production company: Daiei Film
- Release date: November 1, 1955 (Japan)
- Running time: 80 minutes
- Country: Japan
- Language: Japanese

The Iroha Elegy (Japanese: いろは囃子, Hepburn: Iroha Bayashi) is a 1955 Japanese film directed by Bin Kato.

== Cast ==
- Ichikawa Raizō VIII
- Hisako Yamane
- Kōji Mitsui
