= Marumi Shiraishi =

Japanese actress and media personality

Mitsue Minamikawa (南川 光江) (née Matsuda (松田); born 27 November 1962), known by her stage name Marumi Shiraishi (白石 マル美, formerly 白石 まるみ), is an actress and media personality from Tokyo, Japan.

In 1978, Shiraishi auditioned for the part of leading man Hiromi Go's sweetheart on the TBS TV drama, Mū ichozoku and debuted as the girl in "Izakaya Hiromi."

Shiraishi worked as a singer, television and movie actress, and radio personality.

Later, in 2002, she changed the spelling of her stage name from "まるみ" to the identically pronounced "マル美" and has been hosting a TV shopping program, living frugally on Ikinari! Ōgon densetsu, and appearing as a TV travelogue reporter.

As a hobby, she plays in a badminton club.

== Appearances ==
- Taiyō ni Hoero! (TV) guest appearance
- Kotoshi no botan wa yoi botan (1983) (TV)
- Stewardess monogatari (1983) (TV)
- Getsuyō drama land (TV)
- Kaseifu ha mita! (1990-2004) (TV)
- Suna no Shiro (1997) (TV)
- Family (2001)
- Bright Future (2003)
- Morning Salad (TV variety show)
