= Yatarō Kurokawa =

Japanese actor (1910–1984)

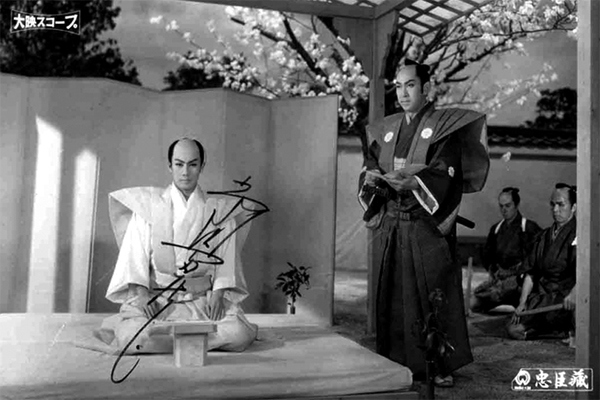
- Chūshingura 1958 studio still
- Born: 15 November 1910; Yokohama, Japan
- Died: 23 June 1984 (aged 73)
- Occupation: Actor
- Years active: 1935-1971

Yatarō Kurokawa (黒川 弥太郎, Kurokawa Yatarō) (15 November 1910 – 23 June 1984) was a Japanese film actor.

== Filmography ==
The filmography of Yatarō Kurokawa includes 228 films from 1935 to 1971:

- A Mother's Love (1950)
- Gate of Hell (1953)
- Akō gishi (1954)
- Asatarō garasu (1956)
- The Renyasai Yagyu Hidden Story (1956)
- Suzunosuke Akado: The One-Legged Demon (1957)
- The Loyal 47 Ronin (忠臣蔵 Chūshingura) (1958)
- Nichiren to Mōko Daishūrai (1958)
