= The Magistrate (1955 film) =

The Magistrate (Jinanbō Hangan)
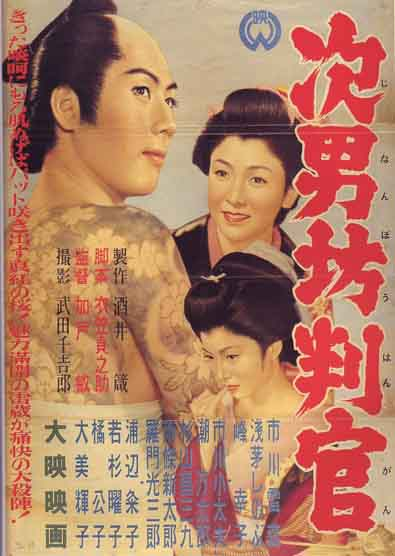
- Japanese movie poster
- Directed by: Bin Kato
- Starring: Ichikawa Raizō VIII; Shinobu Asaji; Sachiko Mine; Kodayu Ichikawa
- Production company: Daiei Film
- Release date: March 25, 1955 (Japan)
- Running time: 83 minutes
- Country: Japan
- Language: Japanese

The Magistrate (Japanese: 次男坊判官, Hepburn: Jinanbō Hangan) is a 1955 black-and-white Japanese film directed by Bin Kato.

== Cast ==
- Ichikawa Raizō VIII as Tōyama no Kin-san
- Shinobu Asaji
- Sachiko Mine
- Kodayu Ichikawa
