= Genzō Murakami =

Japanese writer (1910–2006)

Genzō Murakami 村上 元三
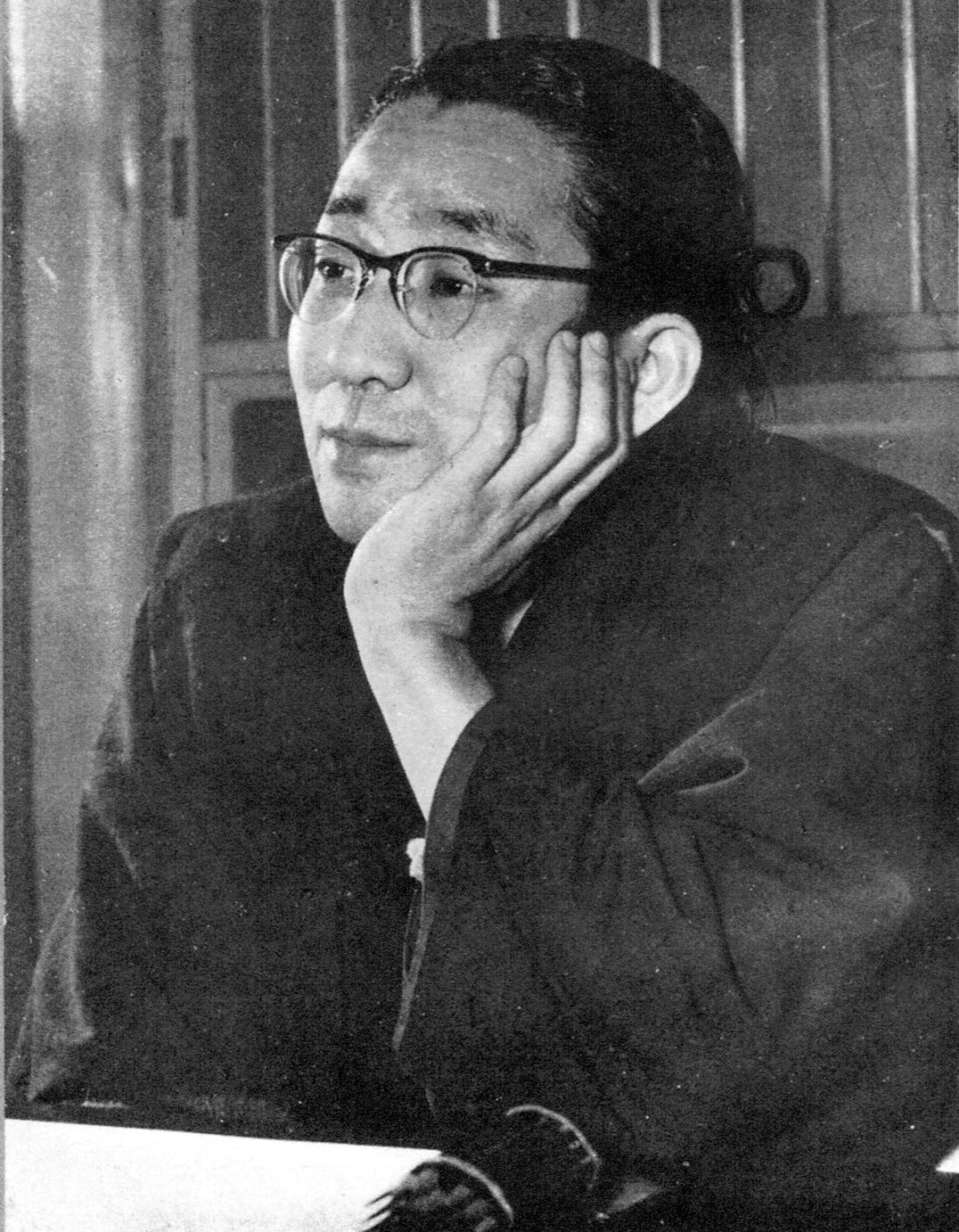
- Born: March 14, 1910; Korea
- Died: April 3, 2006 (aged 96); Tokyo

Genzō Murakami (村上 元三, Murakami Genzō; March 14, 1910 – April 3, 2006) was a Japanese novelist who was born in Korea during its occupation by the Empire of Japan. He is known for his historical novels as well as his influence on Japanese literature following the Second World War.

== Biography ==
Murakami's debut novel, Tone no Kawagiri (利根の川霧), received an honorable mention for an award sponsored by the Sunday Mainichi. In 1940 he received the Naoki Prize for his novel Kazusa Fudoki (上総風土記; lit. "Kazusa Topography").

During the American occupation of Japan, Murakami wrote a novel about the swordsman Sasaki Kojirō, a famous enemy of Miyamoto Musashi. The novel, which was serialized in the Asahi Shimbun and turned into a film in 1950, was notable as one of the few examples of jidaigeki that survived the strict censorship of the time. He became known as a standard-bearer for the revival of popular literature in the postwar period.

Murakami's well-known later works include Mito Kōmon (水戸黄門) and Katsu Kaishū (勝海舟). His period work on Minamoto no Yoshitsune was made into a yearlong Taiga drama by the Japan Broadcasting Corporation (NHK).

He was recognized for his achievements by a Purple Ribbon Medal from the Japanese government in 1974 and he was an Order of the Sacred Treasures recipient in 1981. He died of heart failure at a hospital in Tokyo on April 3, 2006, at the age of 96.
