= Teinosuke Kinugasa =

Japanese film director (1896–1982)

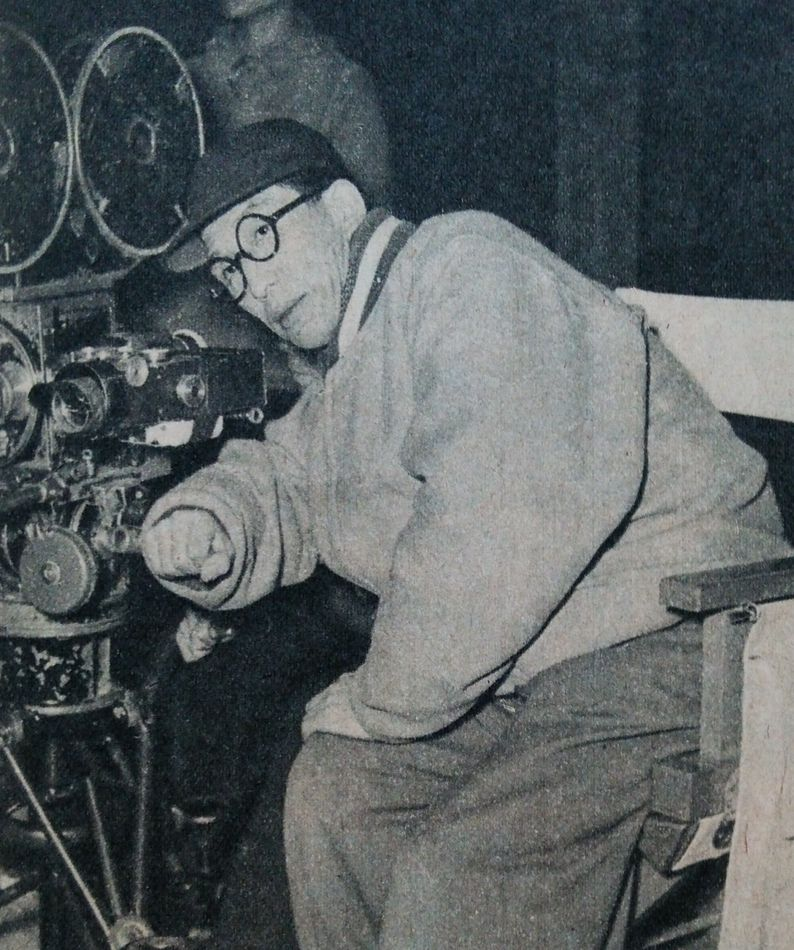
- Kinugasa in 1952
- Born: 1 January 1896; Kameyama, Mie, Japan
- Died: 26 February 1982 (aged 86); Kyoto, Japan
- Occupations: Film director, actor

Teinosuke Kinugasa (衣笠 貞之助, Kinugasa Teinosuke; 1 January 1896 – 26 February 1982) was a Japanese filmmaker and actor. His best-known films include the silent avant-garde films A Page of Madness and Crossroads and the Academy Award-winning historical drama Gate of Hell.

== Biography ==
Kinugasa was born in Kameyama, Mie Prefecture. He began his career as an onnagata (actor specializing in female roles) at the Nikkatsu studio. When Japanese cinema began using actresses in the early 1920s, he switched to directing and worked for producers such as Shozo Makino, before becoming independent to make his best-known film, A Page of Madness (1926). It was considered lost for 45 years until the director rediscovered it in his shed in 1971. A silent film, Kinugasa released it with a new print and score to world acclaim. He also directed the film Crossroads in 1928. He directed jidaigeki at the Shochiku studios, where he helped establish the career of Chōjirō Hayashi (later known as Kazuo Hasegawa). After the war, he helmed big-budget costume productions for Daiei studios. Gate of Hell received the Palme d'or at the 1954 Cannes Film Festival and the Academy Award for Best International Feature Film.

On 26 February 1982, Kinugasa died in Kyoto at the age of 86.

== Selected filmography ==
- 1925: Tsukigata Hanpeita
- 1926: A Page of Madness
- 1927: Oni Azami
- 1928: Crossroads
- 1935: An Actor's Revenge a.k.a. The Revenge of Yukinojo
- 1946: Aru yo no Tonosama
- 1952: Dedication of the Great Buddha
- 1953: Gate of Hell
- 1955: The Romance of Yushima a.k.a. The White Sea of Yushima
- 1956: Shin Heike Monogatari
- 1956: Tsukigata Hanpeita: Hana no maki; Arashi no maki
- 1957: A Fantastic Tale of Naruto
- 1957: A Girl Isn't Allowed to Love
- 1957: Floating Vessel
- 1958: The Snowy Heron
- 1958: Symphony of Love
- 1963: Bronze Magician
