= Tamao Nakamura =

Japanese actress (1939–2026)

- 中村 玉緒
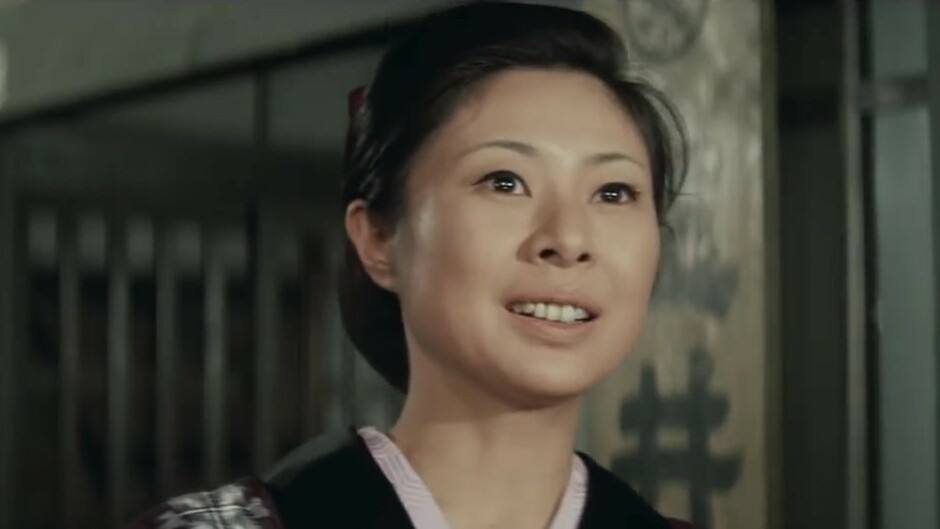
- Born: July 12, 1939; Kyoto, Japan
- Died: June 9, 2026 (aged 86); Kyoto, Japan
- Occupation: Actress
- Years active: 1953–2026
- Agent: Nagara Production
- Spouse: Shintaro Katsu (m. 1961; died 1997)
- Parent: Nakamura Ganjirō II
- Relatives: Nakamura Kanjaku III (great-grandfather); Nakamura Ganjirō I (grandfather); Sakata Tōjūrō IV (older brother); Nakamura Ganjirō IV (nephew); Nakamura Senjaku III (nephew); Nakamura Kazutarō (great-nephew); Nakamura Toranosuke (great-nephew)

Tamao Nakamura (中村 玉緒, Nakamura Tamao; July 12, 1939 – June 9, 2026) was a Japanese actress. Her father was kabuki actor Nakamura Ganjirō II.

== Career ==
Nakamura was scouted by director Teruo Ogiyama and made her film debut with Kageko to Yukie when she was a junior high school student. After graduating junior high school, she signed her contract with Daiei film company in 1954. She married actor Shintaro Katsu in 1962. In the 1990s, she expanded her career into variety shows and gained widespread popularity. A character modeled after her, Tamao Nakamure, appeared in the 1997 film Crayon Shin-chan: Pursuit of the Balls of Darkness. Nakamura died from pneumonia on June 9, 2026, at the age of 86.

== Filmography ==
=== Film ===
- Zenigata Heiji: Ghost Lord (1954)
- Three Stripes in the Sun (1955)
- Flowery Brothers (1956)
- Sisters of the Gion (1956)
- Zangiku monogatari (1956)
- An Osaka Story (1957)
- Onibi Kago (1957)
- The Loyal 47 Ronin (1958)
- Nuregami kenpō (1958)
- Enjō (1958)
- The Demon of Mount Oe (1960)
- Scar Yosaburo (1960)
- Satan's Sword (1960)
- Satan's Sword II (1960)
- The Human Condition III: A Soldier's Prayer (1961)
- Ten Dark Women (1961)
- Satan's Sword III (1961)
- Enter Kyōshirō Nemuri the Swordman (1963) as Chisa
- Taking The Castle (1965)
- The Man Without a Map (1968)
- The River with No Bridge (1992)
- The Inugami (2006)
- Ninja Kids!!! (2011), Shina Yamamoto
- Destiny: The Tale of Kamakura (2017), Kin
- The One I Long to See (2023)
- The Rightman (2025)

=== Television ===
- Shin Heike Monogatari (1972), Taira no Tokiko
- Hissatsu Shikakenin (1972)
- Hissatsu Shiokiya Kagyō (1975)
- Abarenbō Shōgun repeating role as mother of title character
- Beppin san (2016), Tokuko Bandō
