= Sakata Tōjūrō =

Sakata Tōjūrō (坂田藤十郎; Japanese pronunciation: [saꜜ.ka.ta (|) toː.d(ʑ)ɯː.ɾoː],) refers to a family of kabuki actors in Kyoto and Osaka and it is the stage name of a series of Kabuki actors over the course of the history of the form.

The first Sakata Tōjūrō (1646–1709) was the most popular kabuki actor in Kyoto-Osaka during the Genroku era. He played tachiyaku roles. He pioneered the wagoto form of the Kamigata (Kansai) theatre as his counterpart in Edo, Ichikawa Danjūrō I, did the same for the aragoto form.

Sakata Tōjūrō was actor-manager (zagashira) of the Mandayū Theatre in Kyoto; and during this period, the house playwright Chikamatsu Monzaemon. Chikamatsu praised the actor's craft, including careful attention to the dramatic requirements of the script and encouraging other actors to study the actual details of a character's circumstances.

Unlike most other kabuki lineages which can be traced back in a more or less unbroken line, whether by blood or by adoption, the name of Sakata Tōjūrō was not held for over 230 years, from the death of Sakata Tōjūrō III in 1774 until the name was taken up, and the lineage restarted, by Nakamura Ganjirô III, who changed his name to Sakata Tōjūrō IV in 2005.

== Lineage ==
- Sakata Tōjūrō I (1646–1709) - Originated the wagoto form; innovator of Genroku kabuki.
- Sakata Tōjūrō II (1711–1724) - Student of Tōjūrō I.
- Sakata Tōjūrō III (1739–1774) - Adopted son of Tōjūrō II.
- Sakata Tōjūrō IV (2005–2020) - Formerly Nakamura Ganjirō IV. Took on the name in order to revive the lineage, and as part of a greater effort to maintain Kamigata kabuki.
