= Ayame (given name) =

- Language: Japanese

Origin
- Meaning: "Iris" and other meanings depending on the kanji

Other names
- See also: Ayane

Ayame is a feminine Japanese given name.

== People ==
- Ayame Goriki (剛力 彩芽; born 1992), Japanese actress and model
- Ayame Hikawa (肥川 彩愛; born 1994), Japanese idol and former member of NMB48
- Ayame Koike (小池 彩夢; born 1995), Japanese actress
- Ayame Misaki (水崎 綾女; born 1989), Japanese actress who is affiliated with Horipro
- Ayame Mizushima (水島 あやめ; 1903–1990), Japanese novelist and screenwriter
- Ayame Sasamura (笹村あやめ; born 1995), Japanese professional wrestler
- Yoshizawa Ayame (吉沢 菖蒲), a lineage of Kabuki actors, including:
  - Yoshizawa Ayame I (初代 吉沢 菖蒲; 1673–1729), Japanese Kabuki actor

== Characters ==
- Ayame (Inuyasha), a female wolf in Inuyasha
- Ayame Sohma, a male character in Fruits Basket
- Ayame, a female character in the video game Phoenix Wright: Ace Attorney – Trials and Tribulations
- Ayame, a female samurai and Mythril Musketeer in Final Fantasy XI
- Ayame, a female messenger in Yu Yu Hakusho
- Ayame (Tenchu), a female character in the Tenchu video games
- Ayame (Power Stone), a female character in the Power Stone video games
- Ayame Futaba, a female character from the anime series Code Geass
- Ayame Ichiraku, a female character from the anime and manga series Naruto
- Ayame, a female character from the anime and manga series Bleach (manga), who is a part of Orihime Inoue's Shun Shun Rikka
- Ayame, a female character and one of the Cerulean sisters in the anime series Pokémon (anime), her name is Violet in the English dub
- Ayame Kimura, a female main protagonist of the series "Agents of Havoc"
- Ayame Yomogawa, a female character in the anime series Kabaneri of the Iron Fortress
- Ayame Kajo, a female character in the anime and manga Shimoneta
- Ayame from Senran Kagura video game franchise
- Ayame Oguni, a female character in Rurouni Kenshin
- Ayame Hatano, the Ultimate Sprinter from Danganronpa Another Despair Academy
- Ayame Hazakura, a female character in the light novel series Agents of the Four Seasons

== See also ==
- Ayame (disambiguation)
