= Ayan =

Ayan may refer to:

== Places ==
- Auyán-tepui, also spelt Ayan, a mountain in Bolívar state, Venezuela
- Ayan, Çankırı, a village in Turkey
- Ayan, Iran, a village in West Azerbaijan Province, Iran
- Ayan, Russia, a rural locality (a selo) and a port in Khabarovsk Krai on the Sea of Okhotsk, Russia
- Ayan Virusampatti, village in Tamil Nadu, India
- Ayan-Yuryakh a river in the Magadan Oblast in Russia.

== Other uses ==
- Ayan (class), the powerful local notables in the Ottoman Empire before the 1920s
- Ayan (tree), the Yoruba name for the Pericopsis laxiflora.
- Ayan (film), a 2009 Indian Tamil film starring Suriya
  - Ayan (soundtrack), its soundtrack by Harris Jayaraj
- Ayan (given name), a list of people with the name
- Chanel Ayan, model and star of The Real Housewives of Dubai
- Derebey, also known as âyân, feudal lord in 18th century Anatolia

== See also ==
- Ayaan, a given name
- Ayyan (disambiguation)
- Ayana (disambiguation)
- Ajan (disambiguation)
