= Nakamura Tomijūrō V =

Japanese Kabuki actor

Nakamura Tomijūrō V (五代目 中村 富十郎, Godaime Nakamura Tomijūrō; June 4, 1929 – January 3, 2011) was a Japanese Kabuki actor and Living National Treasures of Japan. Tomijūrō work in Kabuki included the role of Musashibō Benkei, a Japanese warrior monk, in the drama, Kanjinchō. Outside Japan, Tomijūrō toured performed in the United States and Europe.

Tomijūrō was born Hajime Watanabe to Nakamura Tomijūrō IV and dancer, Tokuho Azuma. He made his theater debut in 1943 using the stage name, Bandō Tsurunosuke. In 1964, he became the sixth Ichimura Takenojō, another stage name. He further became the fifth Nakamura Tomijuro in 1972, succeeding his father's stage title.

In addition to Kabuki, Tomijūrō also appeared in film and television roles during his career. His film roles included Sharaku in 1995 and Gakko II in 1996. Tomijūrō's television credits included 1980's Shishi no Jidai (The Era of Lion) and the 1974 television series, Katsu Kaishū, based on the life of Katsu Kaishū.

Tomijūrō was named a Living National Treasures of Japan in 1994. He was inducted into the Japan Art Academy in 1996 and was further honored as a Person of Cultural Merit in 2008.

A native of Tokyo, Tomijūrō stopped performing Kabuki in November 2010 due to declining health. He died from rectal cancer at a hospital in Tokyo on January 3, 2011, at the age of 81. He was survived by a son, Nakamura Takanosuke, who was born in 1999, when Tomijūrō was 70 years old, and a daughter, born in 2003, when he was 74.

== Lineage ==
Like many Kabuki actors, Tomijūrō V comes from a family with a tradition of Kabuki theater (known as Tennōjiya or Watanabe family), being the second Kabuki actor in his family (and the fifth actor overall) to assume the presstigious name Nakamura Tomijūrō (usually given to the head of the Tennōjiya acting house), becoming Nakamura Tomijūrō V (五代目 中村富十郎),

His great-grandfather, Bandō Hikojūrō I (初代 坂東彦十郎) was a supporting actor who was known for being a tachiyaku (i.e., an actor specializing in male roles).

His first grandfather, Bandō Hikojūrō II (二代目 坂東彦十郎) was a promising Kabuki actor who, like his father, was also a tachiyaku actor.

His second grandfather, Ichimura Uzaemon XV (十五代目 市村羽左衛門) was one of the best Kabuki actors of the 20th century, known for being one of the most outstanding tachiyaku actors of the Taisho and Showa eras and whose specialty was the nimaime (handsome and refined young lovers) and sabakiyaku (man of judgement) roles, as well as being the fifteenth actor to inherit the prestigious name Ichimura Uzaemon (市村羽左衛門)

His father, Nakamura Tomijūrō IV (四代目 中村富十郎) was one of the greatest onnagata actors of the 20th century and was the first actor in his family (and the fourth actor overall) to inherit the prestigious name Nakamura Tomijūrō (中村富十郎).

His half-brother, Nakamura Kikaku I (初代 中村亀鶴) was a kaneru yakusha, meaning he played both male and female roles.

Tomijūrō V's son, Nakamura Takanosuke I (初代 中村鷹之助) is a rising Kabuki actor and Kabuki dancer and the future head of the Tennojiya acting house. Like his father, he is also a tachiyaku actor and it is said that in the future he will become the head of the Tennojiya house and inherit the name Nakamura Tomijūrō, becoming Nakamura Tomijūrō VI (六代目 中村富十郎).

His grandson, Nakamura Kazutarō I (初代 中村壱太郎) is a popular kabuki actor and heir to the Kamigata branch of the Narikomaya acting house. He is the son of Azuma Tokuhō II (the eldest daughter of Tomijūrō V) and Nakamura Ganjirō IV (the current head of the Kamigata branch of the Narikomaya house, eldest son of the legendary kabuki actor Sakata Tōjūrō IV (四代目 坂田藤十郎) and grandson of Nakamura Ganjirō II (二代目 中村鴈治郎), one of the greatest kabuki actors of the Showa era).
