= Sakata Tōjūrō I =

Japanese kabuki actor (1647–1709)

Sakata Tōjūrō I 初代坂田藤十郎
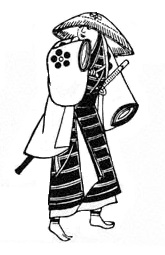
- Born: 1647; Kyoto, Japan
- Died: 1 November 1709 (aged 61–62); Kyoto, Japan
- Other names: Sakata Izaemon, Yamashiroya
- Occupations: kabuki actor and zamoto (theatre manager)
- Years active: 1676-1708
- Children: Sakata Tōkūrō (eldest son); Sakata Hyōshichirō (youngest son)
- Father: Sakata Ichiemon
- Relatives: Sakata Ichinojō (brother); Sakata Hyōshirō (nephew)

Sakata Tōjūrō I (初代坂田藤十郎, shodai Sakata Tōjūrō) (1647 – 1 November 1709) was an early kabuki actor of the Genroku period in Japan. He was a pioneer of the wagoto style, and of Kamigata kabuki more generally. His influence persists in the lineage of actors who have taken up his artistic mantle.

== Life and career ==
Tōjūrō was born in Kyoto in 1647; his father, Sakata Ichiemon, was a theatre owner. Sakata Tōjūrō was actor-manager (zagashira) of the Mandayū Theatre in Kyoto; and during this period, the house playwright Chikamatsu Monzaemon. Chikamatsu praised the actor's craft, including careful attention to the dramatic requirements of the script and encouraging other actors to study the actual details of a character's circumstances.

He played tachiyaku roles.

In February 1678, Tōjūrō organized and performed in a play called Yūgiri Nagori no Shōgatsu which centered upon Osaka's famous and popular courtesan Yūgiri, who had died the previous month. It was in this play that Tōjūrō first pioneered the wagoto style of restrained, emotional, and realistic or naturalistic acting. This play would set the precedent not only for on-stage acting styles in Kamigata kabuki, but also for plot elements and structure. Kuruwa Bunshō, a play heavily based on Yūgiri Nagori no Shōgatsu, and first performed in 1808, remains today one of the core pieces in the Kamigata repertoire.

After a number of years in Osaka, Tōjūrō returned to Kyoto, where he continued performing regularly. The year 1693 saw the premiere, at the Miyako Mandayū theatre, of Butsumo Mayasan Kaichō, the first of a number of plays written by the great bunraku playwright Chikamatsu Monzaemon specifically for Tōjūrō.

As zamoto, Tōjūrō not only performed regularly, but oversaw the production of plays along with the management and upkeep of the theatre. In addition to performing at his own Miyako Mandayū theatre, he performed at Kyoto theatres owned by Hayagumo Chōdayū, Kameya Kumenojō, and Hoteiya Umenojō, the last of which was managed by his son, Sakata Heishichirō.

He is particularly famous for performing alongside Yoshizawa Ayame I, the chief pioneer onnagata, specializing in playing only female roles. Tōjūrō is also known for his friendship with Edo actor Nakamura Shichisaburō I, whom he met when the latter was on tour in Kamigata in 1698. Along with Ayame, Tōjūrō features prominently in the Actors' Analects, a collection of Genroku-era (1688–1704) writings on kabuki, containing primarily insights into the lives of kabuki actors, their insights and advice on acting.

Over the course of his career, Tōjūrō played a great many roles, perhaps most frequently that of Fujiya Izaemon, the male lead and Yūjiri's lover in the various versions of Yūgiri Nagori no Shōgatsu which were written and produced over the years. It was in this role that he made his wagoto debut in the 1678 production of Yūgiri Nagori no Shōgatsu, and in which he made his final stage appearance, in an October 1708 production by the same name.

Unlike his Edo counterpart, Ichikawa Danjūrō I, Tōjūrō's line lasted a very few generations and died out less than a century after his death. His sons Sakata Tōkurō and Sakata Heishichirō were active in the kabuki world, but neither succeeded to the Tōjūrō name. Rather, Sakata Tōjūrō II was an unrelated disciple of the first Tōjūrō; His successor, Sakata Tōjūrō III, was a distant relative of the first Tōjūrō. adopted by Tōjūrō II adopted Tōjūrō III as his son and heir.

Following the death of Tōjūrō III in 1774, no one held the name of Sakata Tōjūrō for over 230 years, until in 2005, the third Nakamura Ganjirō revived the name, becoming Sakata Tōjūrō IV.

== Lineage ==
- Sakata Tōjūrō I (1646–1709) - Originated the wagoto form; innovator of Genroku kabuki.
- Sakata Tōjūrō II (1711–1724) - Student of Tōjūrō I.
- Sakata Tōjūrō III (1739–1774) - Adopted son of Tōjūrō II.
- Sakata Tōjūrō IV (2005–present) - Formerly Nakamura Ganjirō IV. Took on the name in order to revive the lineage, and as part of a greater effort to maintain Kamigata kabuki.
