= Konuma =

Konuma (written: 小沼) is a Japanese surname. Notable people with the surname include:

- Ayane Konuma (小沼 綺音, born 2000), Japanese television personality
- Konuma Katsuyuki (小沼 克行, born 1955), Japanese sumo wrestler
- Masaru Konuma (小沼 勝, born 1937), Japanese film director
