= List of full members of the Korea Music Copyright Association =

List of associate members promoted to full membership of KOMCA

The Korea Music Copyright Association (KOMCA) has distinguished between full members (정회원) and associate members (준회원) since February 11, 1978. Associate members may be promoted to full membership based mainly on their length of membership and copyright-royalty earnings.

This list includes music creators whose promotion or re-promotion to full membership has been publicly announced, arranged by year. It is not a complete register of current or former full members. Where full lists are unavailable, membership figures are summarized instead.

== Background ==
The number of full-member promotions has varied over time. Some selections have also included former full members who were promoted again after losing their status under KOMCA's rules. Full members may lose their status if they fail to attend more than four consecutive general meetings.

== 1964-1999 ==
KOMCA was founded in 1964 with 56 members: 38 from popular music, 11 from children's music, five from traditional Korean music and two from classical music. At its founding general meeting on March 15, composer Son Mok-in was elected the association's first president. KOMCA was formally approved on June 19.

KOMCA did not initially distinguish between full and associate members. The two membership categories were introduced at its 15th regular general meeting on February 11, 1978.

KOMCA's membership continued to grow, passing 1,000 registered music creators in 1989. By the end of 1999, KOMCA had 3,654 registered creators, successors, assignees and music publishers. Of the 3,574 music creators, 581 were full members.

KOMCA membership by musical field at the end of 1999
Musical field	Registered creators	Full members	Ref.
Popular music	3,161	481	
Classical music	204	54	
Children's music	101	28	
Traditional Korean music	42	17	
Religious music	66	1	
Total	3,574	581	

The remaining 80 registrations consisted of 21 successors to deceased rightsholders, 13 assignees and 46 music publishers.

== 2000-2010 ==
KOMCA's registered rightsholder base expanded rapidly during the 2000s. The association had approximately 4,000 trust-contract holders in 2000, while the number approached 9,000 by 2008. In November 2009, KOMCA announced that the number had surpassed 10,000; its 10,000th trust-contract holder was popular-music creator Kwon Young-hwan.

Annual figures supplied by the Ministry of Culture, Sports and Tourism and published by the office of National Assembly member Lee Ki-heon are available from 2007. During this period, KOMCA recorded 165 promotions to full membership.

KOMCA full-membership figures, 2007-2010
Year	Promoted during year	Full members at year-end	Total registered rightsholders	Full-member share	Ref.
2007	36	704	7,957	8.8%	
2008	47	699	8,855	7.9%	
2009	53	767	10,202	7.5%	
2010	29	776	11,658	6.7%	

The number of full members recorded at the end of each year was not a cumulative total of annual promotions, as existing full members could cease to hold the status and could later qualify for re-promotion under KOMCA's regulations. Although the total number of full members increased between 2007 and 2009, their proportion of KOMCA's registered rightsholders declined from 8.8 percent to 7.5 percent as the association's wider membership grew.

== 2011-2015 ==
KOMCA full-membership figures, 2011-2015
Year	Promoted during year	Full members at year-end	Total registered rightsholders	Full-member share	Ref.
2011	4	766	13,421	5.7%	
2012	36	782	15,058	5.1%	
2013	40	780	17,041	4.5%	
2014	62	823	19,507	4.2%	
2015	39	844	21,884	3.8%	

=== 2011 ===
Name	Affiliation	Ref.
G-Dragon	BigBang	
Park Jin-young	JYP Entertainment	
Brave Brothers	Brave Entertainment	

=== 2012 ===
In 2012, KOMCA recorded 36 promotions to full membership. At the end of the year, the association had 782 full members among 15,058 registered rightsholders. The following table is not a complete list and includes only individuals whose promotion in 2012 has been identified in published sources.

Some of full members promoted in 2012
Name	Korean name	Affiliation	Ref.
Kangta	강타	H.O.T.	
Rain	비	—	

=== 2013 ===
In 2013, KOMCA recorded 40 promotions to full membership.

Some of full members promoted in 2013
Name	Korean name	Affiliation	Ref.
Kim Jae-joong	김재중	JYJ	

=== 2014 ===
In 2014, KOMCA recorded 62 promotions to full membership.

Some of full members promoted in 2014
Name	Korean name	Affiliation	Ref.
Kim Junsu	김준수	JYJ	
T.O.P	최승현	BigBang	

=== 2015 ===
In 2015, KOMCA recorded 39 promotions to full membership.

Some of full members promoted in 2015
Name	Korean name	Affiliation	Ref.
BoA	보아	—	
Jang Ki-ha	장기하	Kiha & The Faces	

== 2016-2020 ==
KOMCA full-membership figures, 2016-2020
Year	Promoted during year	Full members at year-end	Total registered rightsholders	Full-member share	Ref.
2016	27	856	24,249	3.5%	
2017	27	878	27,346	3.2%	
2018	27	878	30,697	2.8%	
2019	27	898	34,184	2.6%	
2020	25	907	38,468	2.3%	

=== 2016 ===
In 2016, KOMCA recorded 27 promotions to full membership.

Some of full members promoted in 2016
Name	Korean name	Affiliation	Ref.
IU	아이유	—	
Crush	크러쉬	—	

=== 2017 ===
In 2017, KOMCA recorded 27 promotions to full membership.

Selected full members promoted in 2017
Name	Korean name	Affiliation	Ref.
Im Chang-jung	임창정	—	
Kim Tae-woo	김태우	G.o.d	

=== 2018 ===
In 2018, KOMCA recorded 27 promotions to full membership.

Selected full members promoted in 2018
Name	Korean name	Affiliation	Ref.
Suga	민윤기	BTS	

=== 2019 ===
In 2019, KOMCA recorded 27 promotions to full membership.

Selected full members promoted in 2019
Name	Korean name	Affiliation	Ref.
Woozi	이지훈	Seventeen	
Yong Jun-hyung	용준형	Highlight	
Zico	우지호	Block B	
B.I	김한빈	iKon	
Jung Yong-hwa	정용화	CNBLUE	
Jinyoung	정진영	B1A4	
Jang Beom-june	장범준	Busker Busker	
Kwon Jung-yeol	권정열	10cm	
Zion.T	김해솔	—	
Gray	이성화	—	
Lee Chan-hyuk	이찬혁	AKMU	
Bumzu	계범주	—	
Yiruma	이루마	—	

=== 2020 ===
In 2020, KOMCA recorded 25 promotions to full membership.

Selected full members promoted in 2020
Name	Korean name	Affiliation	Ref.
RM	김남준	BTS	
J-Hope	정호석	BTS	
Paul Kim	김태형	—	
Jay Park	박재범	—	
Kim Min-seok	김민석	MeloMance	
Jo Hyun-ah	조현아	Urban Zakapa	
Kwon Soon-il	권순일	Urban Zakapa	
Giriboy	홍시영	—	
Seo Ji-eum	서지음	—	

== 2021-2025 ==
KOMCA full-membership figures, 2021-2025
Year	Promoted during year	Full members at year-end	Total registered rightsholders	Full-member share	Ref.
2021	26	919	43,071	2.1%	
2022	26	930	47,140	1.9%	
2023	25	946	51,244	1.8%	
2024	30	958	55,544	1.7%	
2025	30	—	—	—	

=== 2021 ===
KOMCA's annual statistics recorded 26 promotions in 2021. The contemporary announcement named 25 individual creators; the annual total also included a music publisher.

Selected full members promoted in 2021
Name	Korean name	Affiliation	Ref.
Kang Seung-yoon	강승윤	Winner	
Mino	송민호	Winner	
Sunwoo Jung-a	선우정아	—	
Changmo	구창모	—	
Loco	권혁우	—	
Roy Kim	김상우	—	
Maktub	양진모	—	
Jung Jae-il	정재일	—	
Cloud	고형석	—	
Kim Hyun-woo	김현우	—	
Lee Jun-ho	이준호	—	

=== 2022 ===
In 2022, KOMCA recorded 26 promotions to full membership, including one successor to a deceased rightsholder.

Publicly identified full members promoted in 2022
Name	Korean or registered name	Affiliation or identity	Notes	Ref.
Gangsane	강산에	Singer-songwriter		
Gary	개리	Leessang	Re-promoted	
Gil	길	Leessang	Re-promoted	
Kim Ji-hwan	김지환	Songwriter and producer		
Noh Young-shim	노영심	Singer-songwriter	Re-promoted	
Yerin Baek	백예린	Singer-songwriter		
BewhY	비와이	Rapper and producer		
Beenzino	빈지노	Rapper and songwriter		
Im Hyun-sik	임현식	BtoB		
Jang Ki-ha	장기하	Singer-songwriter	Re-promoted	
Heize	헤이즈	Singer-songwriter		
Jang Jun-ho	장준호	Faces of Glory production team		
Jin Sung	진성	Singer		

=== 2023 ===
In 2023, KOMCA recorded 25 promotions to full membership.

Publicly identified full members promoted in 2023
Name	Korean or registered name	Affiliation or identity	Notes	Ref.
Han	한	Stray Kids		
Bang Chan	방찬	Stray Kids		
Changbin	창빈	Stray Kids		
minGtion	밍지션	Songwriter and producer		
Megatone	Megatone	Member of the production team 13		
Kim Soo-hee	김수희	Singer-songwriter		
Kim Chang-hoon	김창훈	Musician and songwriter		
Wild Boar	멧돼지	Producer		
24	서정훈	Producer		
Lee Jin-sung	이진성	Monday Kiz		
ROVIN	ROVIN	Producer		
The Black Skirts	검정치마	Singer-songwriter		
Nangi	낭이	BEOMxNANG	(Note: Nangi is the member known as Nangi of the production team BEOMxNANG (범이낭이).)	
Simon Jin	진시몬	Singer-songwriter		
Choi Jung-hoon	최정훈	Jannabi		

=== 2024 ===
In 2024, KOMCA promoted 30 people: 27 selected across all musical fields and three allocated to non-popular music.

Publicly identified full members promoted in 2024
Name	Korean or registered name	Affiliation or identity	Notes	Ref.
Jungkook	전정국	BTS		
Soyeon	전소연	I-dle		
Vernon	최한솔	Seventeen		
Park Gyu-jeong	박규정	Producer		
POP TIME	POP TIME	Producer		
Ahn Ye-eun	안예은	Singer-songwriter		
Ahn Ji-young	안지영	BOL4		
TOIL	안토일	Producer		
Kigen	키겐	Rapper and producer		
Lee Sang-min	이상민	Roo'ra	Re-promoted	
Lee Seu-ran	이스란	Lyricist		
JQ	JQ	Lyricist and producer		
250	이호형	Producer		
EL CAPITXN	장이정	Producer		
Rain	정지훈	Singer-songwriter	Re-promoted	
Code Kunst	조성우	Producer		
FRANTS	최석	Producer		
Versachoi	최승혁	Producer		
Yoon Hye-jung	윤혜정	Children's music	Non-popular-music allocation	
Joo Min-jung	주민정	Religious music	Non-popular-music allocation	
Im Gyo-min	임교민	Traditional Korean music	Non-popular-music allocation	

=== 2025 ===
In 2025, KOMCA promoted 30 people to full membership: 27 from popular music and three from non-popular fields.

Selected full members promoted in 2025
Name	Korean name	Affiliation	Notes	Ref.
S.Coups	최승철	Seventeen		
Lee Mu-jin	이무진	Singer-songwriter		
Younha	고윤하	Singer-songwriter		
Kang Tae-gyu	강태규	Lyricist	(Note: Kang Tae-gyu is credited as a lyricist of “Love Always Runs Away” (사랑은 늘 도망가).)	
Kim Soo-bin	김수빈	Songwriter and producer		
Shaun	김윤호	Singer-songwriter and producer		
MayBee	김은지	Singer-songwriter and lyricist	Re-promoted	
DJ Tukutz	김정식	Epik High		
Jehwi	김제휘	Songwriter and producer		
Peperoni	김준성	Songwriter and producer		
LOOGONE	김지인	Songwriter and producer		
Kim Ho-joong	김호중	Singer		
Colde	김희수	Singer-songwriter and producer		
Noh Joo-hwan	노주환	Songwriter and producer		
Park Sang-chul	박상철	Singer-songwriter		
FRNK	박상희	Producer		
Park Yong-jun	박용준	The Classic		
Park Yong-jin	박용진	Singer and songwriter		
Park Jin-soo	박진수	Songwriter		
The Quiett	신동갑	Rapper and producer	Re-promoted	
Lee Chae-gyu	이채규	Songwriter and producer	(Note: Lee Chae-gyu's credits include IU's “Holssi”, “Shopper”, “Blueming” and “Not Spring, Love, or Cherry Blossoms”.)	
Lee Han-gil	이한길	Songwriter		
Lee Hwi-min	이휘민	GroovyRoom		
Jeon Byeong-seon	전병선	ROYAL DIVE	(Note: Jeon Byeong-seon is a member of ROYAL DIVE. His credits include Baekhyun's “Rendez-Vous”, “Amusement Park” and “Bungee”, and Taeyong's “Tap”.)	
Oliv	정석환	Songwriter and producer		
Jung Sung-sil	정성실	Religious music	Non-popular-music allocation	
Choi Shin-gyu	최신규	Children's music	Non-popular-music allocation	
Ham Jung-pil	함정필	Songwriter		
Hwang Yubin	황유빈	Songwriter and producer		
Hwang Jin-a	황진아	Traditional Korean music	Non-popular-music allocation	

== 2026-present ==
=== 2026 ===
In 2026, KOMCA promoted 30 people to full membership.

Full members promoted in 2026
Name	Korean or registered name	Affiliation or identity	Notes	Ref.
Bae Chul-soo	배철수	Songgolmae		
Young K	강영현	Day6		
Yuqi	송우기	I-dle		
Kang Hwa-seong	강화성	Arranger and producer	(Note: Kang Hwa-seong's arrangement credits include Roy Kim's “Only Then”, Naul's “Memory of the Wind” and “Living in the Same Time”, and HYNN's “The Lonely Bloom Stands Alone”.)	
Kwon Jung-yeol	권정열	10cm	Re-promoted	
Maddox	김경문	Singer-songwriter and producer		
GHSTLOOP	김민수	Producer		
Kim Eun-soo	김은수	Classical/art music	Non-popular-music allocation	
Kim Jung-woo	김정우	Songwriter and producer		
Kim Tae-young	김태영	Songwriter and producer		
Big Sancho	김태호	Producer		
Kim Tae-hong	김태홍	Songwriter and producer	(Note: Kim Tae-hong's credits include Lim Young-woong's “Home”, “Rainbow” and “Hero”.)	
Zion.T	김해솔	Singer-songwriter and producer	Previously promoted to full membership in 2019	
GIGI	김현지	Lyricist	(Note: GIGI's lyric credits include NewJeans' “Hype Boy”, “How Sweet”, “Super Shy”, “ETA” and “Attention”.)	
JUNNY	김형준	Singer-songwriter and producer		
Sunwoo Jung-a	선우정아	Singer-songwriter and producer	Re-promoted	
ASTROZ	손영진	Producer; member of MosPick	(Note: Son Young-jin is also identified as ASTROZ and as a member of the production team MosPick.)	
Shin Jae-hoon	신재훈	Songwriter and producer		
O Nam-hoon	오남훈	Children's music	Non-popular-music allocation	
Lee Seung-hwan	이승환	Singer-songwriter	Re-promoted	
KAKO	이유진	Songwriter and producer	(Note: KAKO's credits include BoyNextDoor's “If I Say, I Love You”, “Hollywood Action” and “I Feel Good”, and Choi Yena's “Nemonemo”. KAKO has been described as affiliated with HYBE.)	
Lee Ji-won	이지원	Songwriter and producer		
Lee Jong-jae	이종재	Songwriter and producer		
Lee Hyuk-jin	이혁진	Religious music	Non-popular-music allocation	
Im Jong-hwa	임종화	Songwriter and producer		
Jang Beom-june	장범준	Singer-songwriter	Re-promoted	
Stella Jang	장성은	Singer-songwriter		
Jeong Si-ro	정시로	Songwriter and producer		
MILLENNIUM	최래성	Producer		
Han Won-tak	한원탁	Songwriter and producer	(Note: Han Won-tak's credits include works for Seventeen, NCT Dream and Stray Kids, as well as Lovelyz's “Twinkle”.)	

== See also ==
- Korea Music Copyright Association
