= Ayane =

- Gender: Female
- Language: Japanese

Origin
- Meaning: Different depending on the kanji (usually "colorful sound")

Other names
- See also: Ayame

Ayane (/aˈjaˌnɛ/) is the romanization of a feminine Japanese given name. Literally translated it means "colorful sound" (彩音 or 綺音).

- Ayane (singer) (彩音), Japanese singer-songwriter
- Ayane Konuma (小沼 綺音; born 2000), Japanese television personality
- Ayane Kurihara (栗原 文音; born 1989), Japanese badminton player.
- Ayane Miura (三浦 綺音; born 1974), Japanese model and actress
- Ayane Miyazaki (宮﨑 彩音; born 2002), Japanese Nordic combined skier
- Ayane Nakamura (中村 愛音; born 1993), Japanese figure skater
- Ayane Ukyō (右京 あやね), Japanese manga artist
- Ayane Yamazaki (山﨑 彩音; born 1999), Japanese singer-songwriter
- Ayane Sakurano (桜乃 彩音; born 1983), Japanese actress
- Ayane Sakura (佐倉 綾音; born 1994), Japanese voice actress and narrator

== Fictional characters ==
- Ayane, a character in the Dead or Alive video game series
- Ayane Yano, a character in the manga (and anime adaptation) Kimi NI Todoke
- Ayane, the titular character in Ayane's High Kick anime
- Ayane, the antagonist in Nagasarete Airantou
- Ayane Yagi, a character in the film Battle Royale II: Requiem

== See also ==
- Malika Ayane (born 1984), Italian singer
- Ayan (given name), an unrelated name
