= Ayan (given name) =

Ayan is a given name.

== Notable people with this name ==
=== Ayan ===
- Ayan Allahverdiyeva, Azerbaijani chess player
- Ayan Bhattacharjee, Indian cricketer
- Ayan Broomfield, Canadian tennis player
- Ayan Mukerji, Indian film director
- Ayan Pal, Indian author and public speaker
- Ayan Sadakov, Bulgarian footballer
- Wael Ayan (born 1985), Syrian international footballer

=== Ayaan ===
- Ayaan Hirsi Ali, Somali-born Dutch-American activist, feminist, author, scholar and politician
- Ayaan Khan (born 1992), Indian cricketer
- Ayaan Ali Khan, Indian classical musician

=== Ayyan ===
- Ayyan Ali, Pakistani model and singer known professionally as Ayyan

== See also ==
- Ayan (disambiguation)
- Ayane, an unrelated name
