= Sakata Tōjūrō IV =

Japanese actor (1931–2020)

Sakata Tōjūrō IV 四代目坂田藤十郎
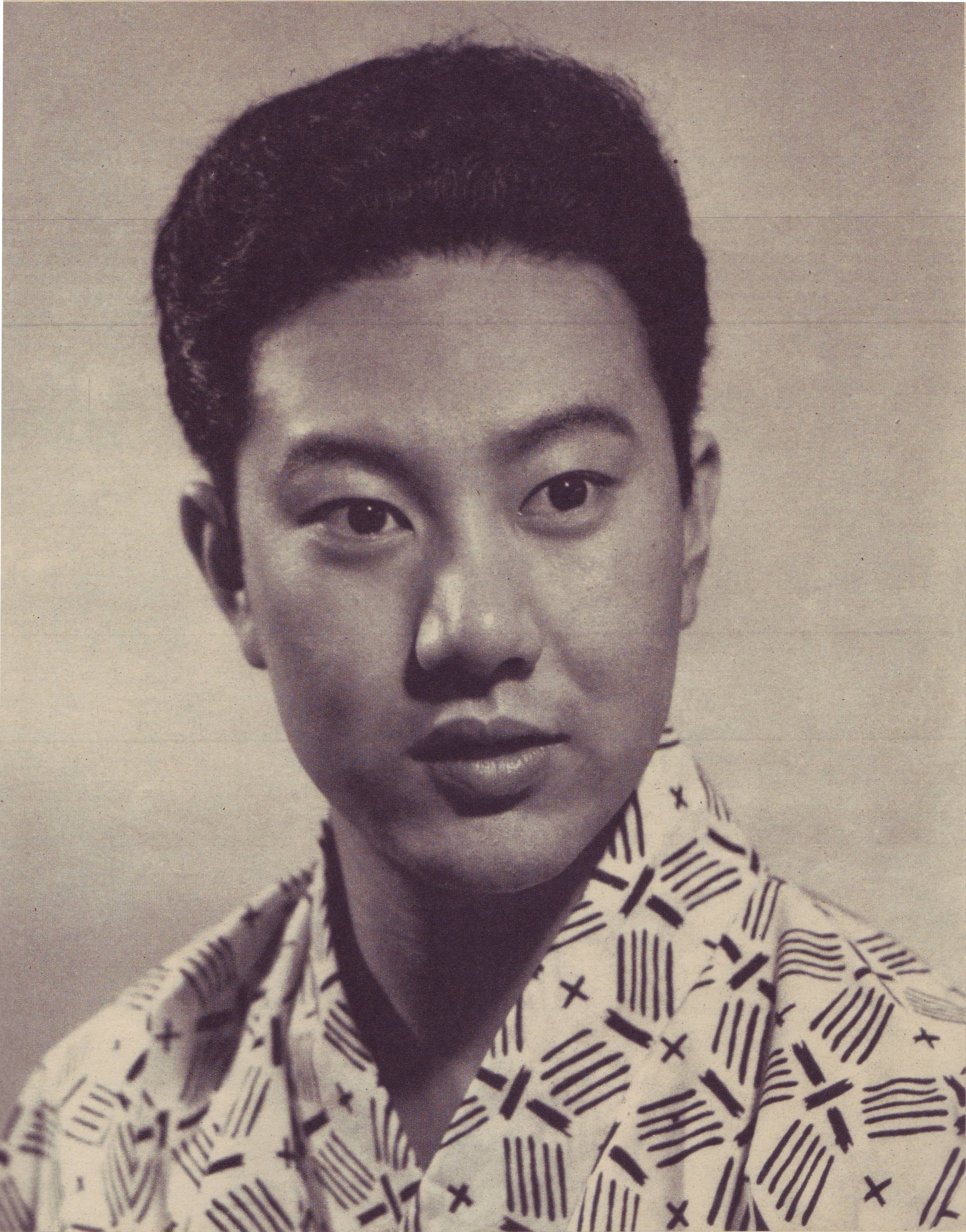
- Sakata Tōjūrō in 1955
- Born: Hirotarō Hayashi; 31 December 1931; Kyoto, Japan
- Died: 12 November 2020 (aged 88)
- Other names: Kōtarō Hayashi; Nakamura Senjaku II; Nakamura Ganjirō III; Narikomaya Yamashiroya
- Occupation: Kabuki actor
- Years active: 1941–2020
- Spouse: Chikage Oogi (m. 1958)
- Children: Nakamura Ganjirō IV (eldest son); Nakamura Senjaku III (youngest son)
- Father: Nakamura Ganjirō II
- Relatives: Nakamura Kanjaku III (great-grandfather); Nakamura Ganjirō I (grandfather); Hayashi Mataichirō II (uncle); Tamao Nakamura (younger sister); Azuma Tokuho II (daughter-in-law) (Note: She is the daughter of the late Kabuki actor Nakamura Tomijūrō V, wife of Nakamura Ganjirō IV (Tōjūrō IV's eldest son) and mother of Nakamura Kazutarō); Nakamura Kazutarō (grandson) (Note: Son of Nakamura Ganjirō IV (Tojuro IV's eldest son) and Azuma Tokuho II (daughter of Kabuki actor Nakamura Tomijūrō V).); Nakamura Toranosuke (grandson)

Sakata Tōjūrō IV (四代目坂田藤十郎, Yondaime Sakata Tōjūrō; born Hirotarō Hayashi (林 宏太郎, Hayashi Hirotarō), 31 December 1931 – 12 November 2020) was a Japanese kabuki actor in the Kamigata style and was officially designated a Living National Treasure. Unlike most kabuki actors, he performed both male and female roles, and was renowned as both a skilled wagotoshi (actor of male roles in the wagoto tradition) and onnagata (actor of female roles). He was the fourth in the line of Sakata Tōjūrō, having revived the name after a lapse of over 230 years.

== Lineage ==
Though he bears no direct hereditary connection to the previous lineage of Sakata Tōjūrō which he has revived, Tōjūrō traced his line back several generations within the kabuki world. He is the eldest son of Nakamura Ganjirō II, the grandson of Nakamura Ganjirō I, and the great-grandson of Nakamura Kanjaku III, who was adopted into the kabuki families by Nakamura Utaemon IV.

Tōjūrō's sons Nakamura Ganjirō IV and Nakamura Senjaku III perform as kabuki actors, as do his grandsons Nakamura Kazutarō and Nakamura Toranosuke.

== Early life and career ==
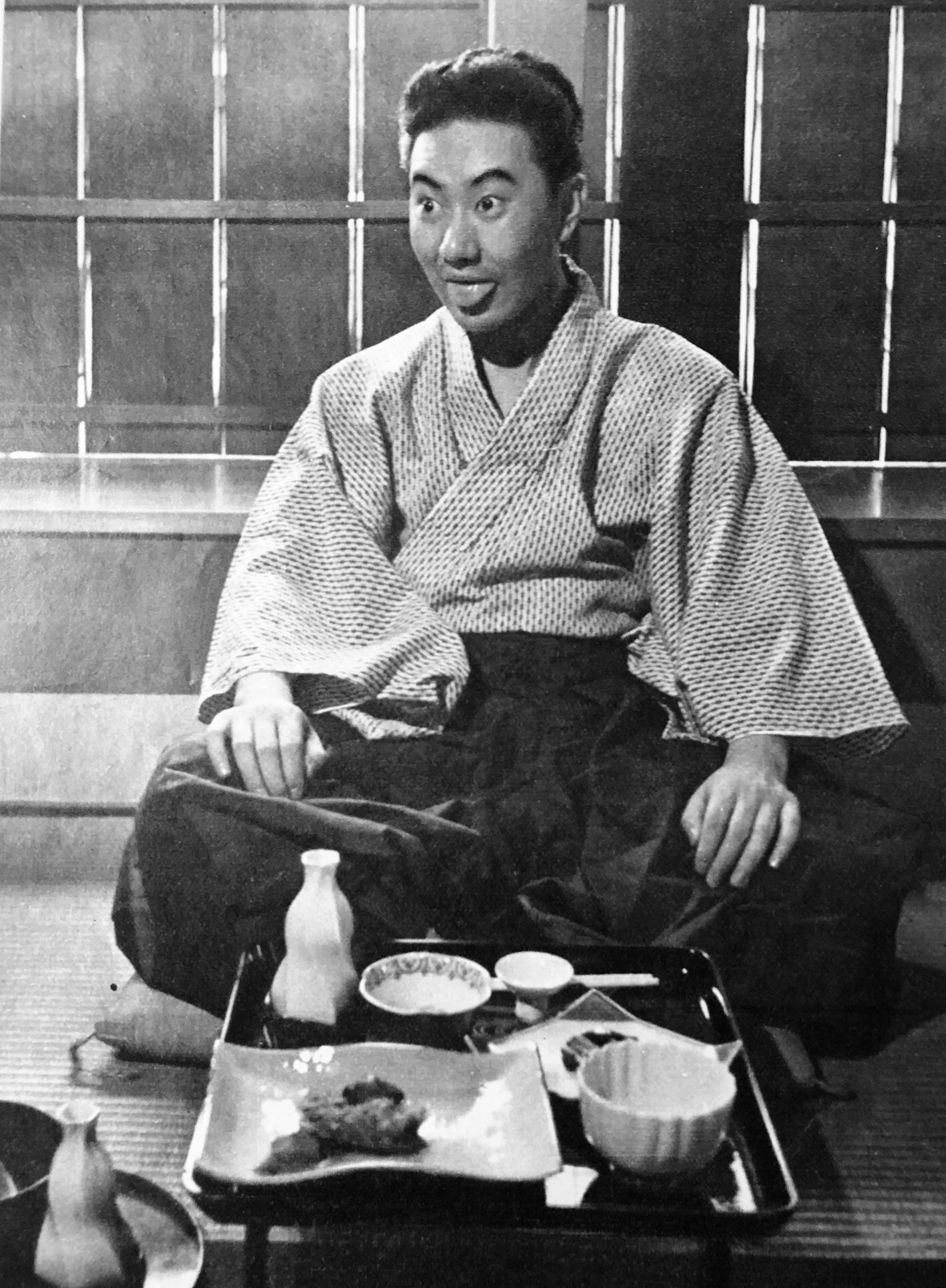
Tojuro in September 1954.

Tōjūrō was born on New Year's Eve 1931, the eldest son of actor Nakamura Ganjirō II. He made his first appearance on stage in October 1941, under the name Nakamura Senjaku II, at the Kado-za in dotonbori Osaka, in the play Komochi Yamanba.

Throughout his career, Tojuro IV has performed primarily in Osaka, performing in both traditional pieces which have long been in the repertoire, and in new kabuki works, primarily by playwright Nobuo Uno. He also frequently took part in revival performances in Tokyo of works by the great bunraku (puppet theatre) playwright Chikamatsu Monzaemon. Tōjūrō acted in the first performance of "The Love Suicides at Sonezaki" (Sonezaki Shinjū), one of the playwright's most famous works, since the end of World War II at the Shinbashi Enbujō in 1953. In February 1955, Tojuro IV left Shochiku and became an exclusive actor for Hankyu Corporation and Takarazuka Film Productions, a subsidiary of Toho. In March 1963, Tojuro IV returned to Shochiku and resumed his activities as a kabuki actor. The playwright's 250th memorial service was observed with the revival of Horikawa Nami no Tsuzumi in 1973.

In 1982, Senjaku founded the Chikamatsu-za, a traveling troupe devoted to performing and reviving Chikamatsu's works. These tours have taken him to many cities across Japan, as well as to England, the US, China, and elsewhere. On these tours he not performed, but gave lectures and cultural workshops as well. The tours frequently feature "The Love Suicides at Amijima" (Amijima Shinjū), and sometimes feature revivals of plays not performed for centuries. The 1998 tour saw the revival of Keisei Mibu Dainenbutsu which had not been performed since 1702.

Senjaku inherited his father's name and he became Nakamura Ganjirō III in November 1990, in a shūmei ceremony at the Kabuki-za in Tokyo. Ganjirō was then named a Living National Treasure (人間国宝, ningen kokuhō) in 1994.

He took the name as Sakata Tōjūrō in December 2005. He adopted this new name at the Minami-za in Kyoto. His goal was reviving the lineage which had died out over 230 years prior, with the death of Sakata Tōjūrō III in 1774. He sought to not only honor the memory of the line of Sakata Tōjūrō before him, who pioneered, developed, and maintained the Kamigata (Kansai) kabuki tradition, but also as part of an effort to revive and maintain that tradition himself. He is thus, like the other Tōjūrō before him, seen as a symbol of the Kamigata tradition, and as the top actor in that tradition.

In addition to performing, Tōjūrō oversaw and participated in a number of cultural programs to help encourage interest in kabuki, and to maintain the Kamigata tradition. His September 2007 tour took him to Guangzhou, Beijing, Shanghai, and Hangzhou. In December of that year, he celebrated his 77th birthday (a special birthday in Japan) with a performance of Musume Dōjōji.

In December 2019 just one year before his death, his last stage performance was at the Kyoto Minamiza Theater as Keijuinni in Gion Festival Faith Record Kinkakuji.

== Personal life ==
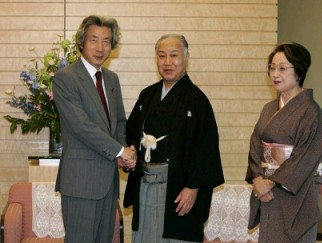
Then-Japanese Prime Minister Junichiro Koizumi (left), kabuki actor Sakata Tōjūrō IV (center), and actress and politician Chikage Oogi (right) during their meeting at the Kantei in Tokyo (27 October 2005)

In October 1958, Tojuro IV married to an actress and politician Chikage Oogi. They had two sons, Tomotaro (b. 6 February 1959) and Hirotaro (b. 19 December 1960), who are both kabuki actors, following in their father's path. His two grandsons, Kazutarō and Toranosuke, who are also both kabuki actors.

== Death ==
Tōjūrō IV died of natural causes in hospital in Tokyo on 12 November 2020, at the age of 88. His death was unrelated to COVID-19.

== Selected works ==
OCLC/WorldCat lists roughly 30+ works by and about Sakata Tōjūrō IVin 30+ publications in 2 languages and 170+ library holdings .

- 近松劇への招待 : 舞台づくりと歌舞伎考 (1989) with Koshirō Uno;
- 通し狂言宿無団七時雨の傘 : 三幕六場 (1992) with Shōzō Namiki and Ginsaku Tobe
- 一生青春 (1997) with Michiko Toki
- 雁治郎芸談 by 中村雁治郎 (2000) Kiyoshi Mizuochi
- 恋飛脚大和往来. 封印切 : 一幕 (2000) with Mansaku Tatsuoka
- 加賀見山旧錦絵: 通し狂言: 四幕七場 (2004) with Yōtai Yō and Shōichi Yamada
- 坂田藤十郎 : 歌舞伎の真髄を生きる (2006)

== Honors ==
- 1990 – Medal with Purple Ribbon
- 1994 – Living National Treasure
- 2003 – Person of Cultural Merit
- 2006 – Osaka Culture Prize Cultural Transmission Prize
- 2008 – Praemium Imperiale
- 2009 – Order of Culture

== See also ==
- Nakamura Kanzaburō
