= Kigen =

Kigen is a surname of Kenyan origin that may refer to: meaning the awaited child male child. originally from the well known large kalenjin community known for their great excellence in long-distance running.

- Mike Kigen (born 1986), Kenyan long-distance track runner and two-time African Championships medallist
- Wilfred Kibet Kigen (born 1975), Kenyan marathon runner and three-time Frankfurt Marathon winner

== Japan ==
Kigen 機嫌 (Kigen), meaning era, origin or mood:

- Dōgen Kigen (1200–1253), Japanese Zen Buddhist teacher
- Mugen Kigen, single by Japanese singer-songwriter Misono
- Amayo no Sanbai Kigen, late-17th century illustrated book depicting Kamigata kabuki actors
- Shin Kigen, early 20th century Japanese socialist magazine
