= Summer Clouds =

1958 Japanese film

Japanese name
- Kanji: 鰯雲
- Directed by: Mikio Naruse
- Written by: Shinobu Hashimoto; Wada Den (novel)
- Produced by: Sanezumi Fujimoto; Reiji Miwa
- Starring: Chikage Awashima; Isao Kimura; Ganjirō Nakamura
- Cinematography: Masao Tamai
- Edited by: Eiji Ooi
- Music by: Ichirō Saitō
- Production company: Toho
- Distributed by: Toho
- Release date: 2 September 1958 (Japan)
- Running time: 129 minutes
- Country: Japan
- Language: Japanese

Summer Clouds (鰯雲, Iwashigumo), also titled Herringbone Clouds, is a 1958 Japanese drama film directed by Mikio Naruse. It was written by Shinobu Hashimoto based on the novel by Wada Den, and was Naruse's first film in colour and in widescreen format.

== Plot ==
Journalist Okawa interviews farming woman Yae for his article on the present situation of farmers under the new constitution and after the agrarian reform. Yae tells of her hard labour life, financial worries, and her low status as a daughter-in-law and widow, which equals to "nothing" as long as her son is not married. At the same time, her older brother Wasuke, married already for the third time, tries to find a wife for his eldest son Hatsuji. When Yae tells Okawa of her brother's search for a daughter-in-law, he suggests a young woman who won a prize in an agricultural contest. During their travels to meet the young woman and her mother, Yae and the married Okawa start an affair. Hatsuji's marriage prospect, Michiko, turns out to be the stepchild of Wasuke's first wife Toyo, who had been thrown out by Wasuke's and Yae's patriarchal father for not showing enough fervour in the field work. Wasuke, insisting that the couple celebrates a traditional, lavish marriage, tries to borrow money for the ceremony against Yae's advice, who argues that traditions are not of the same importance to younger people. One after another, Wasuke's sons demand their independence in choosing their individual paths in life. Reluctant at first, Wasuke eventually sells the remaining parts of his lands to support his sons, while Yae sees her chance of finding happiness vanish when Okawa is transferred to Tokyo.

== Cast ==
- Chikage Awashima as Yae
- Isao Kimura as Okawa
- Ganjirō Nakamura as Wasuke
- Nijiko Kiyokawa as Tane
- Keiju Kobayashi as Hatsuji
- Hiroshi Tachikawa as Shinji
- Kunio Otsuka as Junzo
- Akemi Ueno as Minko
- Michiko Fujii as Toshie
- Takashi Itō as Shiro
- Masao Oda as Daijiro
- Natsuko Kahara as Yasue
- Kumi Mizuno as Hamako
- Chōko Iida as Hide
- Ken Kubo as Tadashi
- Haruko Sugimura as Toyo
- Yōko Tsukasa as Michiko
- Michiyo Aratama as Chie
- Bontaro Miake as Shirase
- Daisuke Katō as Inspector
- Teruko Nagaoka as landlady
- Teruko Mita as maid

== Reception ==
Naruse biographer Catherine Russell saw in Summer Clouds an "extremely progressive" film for the time of its making, which "incorporates key elements of the woman's film", articulating its social critique through the main character Yae. Additionally, she pointed out Ganjiro Nakamura's performance as Wasuke as one of the film's "real strengths".

Contrary to film historian Alexander Jacoby, who cited Summer Clouds as an example of the "structural elegance" of Naruse's work, Dan Sallitt called the film "too well organized around its subject", but, like Russell, emphasised Nakamura's vivid and energising performance.

== Legacy ==
Summer Clouds was screened at the Museum of Modern Art in 1985 as part of its retrospective on Mikio Naruse, organised by the Kawakita Memorial Film Institute and film scholar Audie Bock.

== Awards ==
Mainichi Film Awards

- Best Screenplay Shinobu Hashimoto (for Summer Clouds, Stakeout and Night Drum)
- Best Actress Chikage Awashima (for Summer Clouds and Hotarubi)
- Best Supporting Actor Ganjirō Nakamura (for Summer Clouds and Conflagration)

Blue Ribbon Awards

- Best Screenplay Shinobu Hashimoto (for Summer Clouds and Stakeout)
- Best Supporting Actor Ganjirō Nakamura (for Summer Clouds and Conflagration)

== Bibliography ==
- Galbraith IV, Stuart (2008). The Toho Studios Story: A History and Complete Filmography. Lanham, Toronto, Plymouth: Scarecrow Press. p. 148. ISBN 978-0-8108-6004-9.
