= Ayyan =

Ayyan may refer to:

- Ayyan (film), a 2011 Indian Tamil-language film
- Ayyan (model), a Pakistani model

== See also ==
- Ayan (disambiguation)
