= Korea Music Copyright Association =

South Korean copyright collective

- 한국음악저작권협회
- Abbreviation: KOMCA
- Formation: March 15, 1964; 62 years ago
- Type: Nonprofit organization; Copyright collective
- Purpose: Administration of copyright in musical works
- Headquarters: Seoul, South Korea
- President: Lee Si-ha
- Affiliations: WIPO; CISAC
- Website: komca.or.kr

The Korea Music Copyright Association (Korean: 한국음악저작권협회; KOMCA) is a South Korean nonprofit copyright collective that manages rights in musical works. It licenses uses including public performance, broadcasting, transmission and reproduction, collects copyright fees and distributes royalties to rights holders.

Founded in 1964, KOMCA was the second collective management organization for musical works established in Asia, after Japan's JASRAC. It was authorized to operate a copyright trust-management business in 1988, became a full member of the International Confederation of Societies of Authors and Composers (CISAC) in 1995 and joined its board in 2019. In 2014, the authorization of the Korean Society of Composers, Authors and Publishers (KOSCAP) ended KOMCA's position as South Korea's only music copyright trust-management organization.

At the end of 2025, KOMCA reported 983 full members, 45,087 associate members and 14,314 non-member trust-contract holders, for a total of 60,384. During the year, it collected ₩445.3 billion in copyright fees and distributed ₩403.2 billion in royalties.

== History ==
=== Background and establishment, 1957-1964 ===
After returning to South Korea in 1957, composer Son Mok-in founded the Korea Popular Song Writers Association to protect songwriters' copyrights. The group was dissolved after the May 16 coup, when the government reorganized cultural organizations. Son later tried to form a broader organization covering popular music, classical music, children's music and traditional Korean music, but his early applications were rejected.

On March 8, 1964, an 11-member organizing committee was formed, with representatives from classical music, traditional Korean music, children's music and popular music. KOMCA held its founding meeting on March 15 with 56 members, and Son was elected as its first president. The association was officially approved by the Ministry of Education on June 19, 1964.

=== Institutional development, 1978–1999 ===
At its 15th regular general meeting on February 11, 1978, KOMCA divided its membership into full and associate members. It began publishing its bulletin Music Copyright in 1986.

KOMCA joined the International Confederation of Societies of Authors and Composers (CISAC) as an associate member in 1987 and received government approval to operate a copyright trust-management business in 1988. It became a full member of CISAC in 1995 and joined the Bureau International de l'Edition Mecanique (BIEM) in 1996.

=== International expansion and growth, 2000–2013 ===
KOMCA completed and moved into its new headquarters on April 7, 2000. From October 18 to 22, 2004, it hosted the 44th CISAC World Congress in Seoul, the first CISAC congress held in Asia in 20 years.

On December 10, 2007, KOMCA signed a reciprocal representation agreement with the Japanese Society for Rights of Authors, Composers and Publishers (JASRAC), which took effect on January 1, 2008. Under the agreement, JASRAC manages KOMCA's repertoire in Japan, while KOMCA manages JASRAC's repertoire in South Korea. The agreement followed South Korea's gradual lifting of restrictions on Japanese popular culture, with the remaining restrictions on the commercial distribution of Japanese music removed in January 2004.

The combined number of KOMCA members and trust-contract holders reached 10,000 on December 5, 2009, and annual copyright-fee collections reached ₩100 billion by December 31, 2010. In 2012, KOMCA collected about ₩11 billion from Japan for uses of Korean music. It collected much smaller amounts from other markets, including about ₩137 million from Hong Kong, ₩130 million from Taiwan, ₩100 million from Singapore and ₩58 million from the United States.

=== Competition and continued growth, 2014-present ===
On September 12, 2014, the Ministry of Culture, Sports and Tourism authorized the Korean Society of Composers, Authors and Publishers (KOSCAP) to operate a music copyright trust-management business. KOMCA had previously been the only organization authorized to do so in South Korea. KOSCAP used a selective trust system, which allowed copyright holders to choose which rights it would manage.

The two organizations later disagreed over the distribution of broadcasting royalties. On April 20, 2015, the ministry approved KOSCAP rules that removed KOMCA's distinction between general, theme, background and signal music, instead taking into account the duration and form of use. KOMCA and several musicians opposed the change, while KOSCAP argued that the previous system disadvantaged background-music composers.

The combined number of KOMCA members and trust-contract holders reached 20,000 on March 16, 2015, 30,000 on October 19, 2018, 40,000 on April 14, 2021, 50,000 on September 19, 2023 and 60,000 on November 27, 2025. Annual copyright-fee collections passed ₩200 billion in 2018, ₩300 billion in 2022 and ₩400 billion in 2023.

KOMCA was elected to the board of directors of the International Confederation of Societies of Authors and Composers (CISAC) in May 2019 and was re-elected in 2022 and 2025.

On May 30, 2024, KOMCA hosted the CISAC General Assembly in Seoul during its 60th-anniversary year. More than 72 societies and collective management organizations were represented at the meeting.

Singer-songwriter Lee Si-ha was elected KOMCA's 25th president on December 16, 2025, and began his four-year term on February 25, 2026.

== Operations ==
KOMCA manages economic rights in musical works entrusted to it by lyricists, composers, arrangers, music publishers and other rights holders. It licenses uses such as public performance, broadcasting, online transmission, webcasting, reproduction and rental.

KOMCA mainly manages rights in the musical work itself, such as the composition and lyrics, rather than rights in a particular sound recording. Using an existing recording may therefore also require permission from performers and record producers.

KOMCA collects copyright fees from businesses and organizations that use works in its repertoire and distributes the resulting royalties to registered rights holders. The amount charged varies according to the type and extent of the use. Under Article 105 of the Copyright Act, copyright trust-management organizations must receive approval from the Ministry of Culture, Sports and Tourism for their royalty rates and administration fees. The ministry must consult interested parties and review the rates through the Korea Copyright Commission. Royalties are distributed under KOMCA's rules using information about which works were used. KOMCA deducts an administration fee before payment, with the rate varying by medium and type of use. Online transmission was KOMCA's largest source of copyright fee collections in 2024. Collections from transmission rose by 15.5 percent to ₩198.9 billion, while reproduction fees from physical recordings fell by 22.1 percent to ₩93.3 billion.

KOMCA manages its repertoire overseas through reciprocal agreements with foreign copyright organizations. These agreements allow foreign organizations to manage KOMCA works in their countries, while KOMCA manages their works in South Korea. As of October 2024, KOMCA had agreements for performance and broadcasting rights with 64 organizations in 61 countries, and for reproduction rights with 38 organizations in 42 countries.

== Membership and governance ==
KOMCA has full members (정회원), associate members (준회원) and trust-contract holders (신탁계약체결자). Trust-contract holders allow KOMCA to manage their copyrights and distribute royalties, but signing a trust agreement does not automatically make them association members or give them voting rights.

At the end of 2025, KOMCA had 983 full members, 45,087 associate members and 14,314 non-member trust-contract holders, for a total of 60,384. This included 392 music publishers. The total passed 60,000 in November 2025, after reaching 40,000 in 2021 and 50,000 in 2023.

=== Full membership ===
KOMCA promotes a limited number of associate members to full membership each year. Thirty people were promoted in each of 2024, 2025 and 2026, with 27 places allocated to popular music and three to non-popular fields such as art music, traditional Korean music, children's music and religious music.

Promotion is based on copyright royalty earnings and length of membership, with associate members ranked by royalty earnings within membership-length groups.

Music publishers have separate eligibility requirements. The rules reported in 2024 required at least three years of associate membership and more than ₩30 million in qualifying copyright royalties in each of the previous three years. KOMCA revised its membership and trust-contract holder eligibility regulations on April 28, 2026.

Full members can attend and vote at KOMCA's general meetings and have voting and candidacy rights in elections for the association's officers.

Full-member status is not permanent. Members who do not meet general-meeting attendance requirements can lose their status and return to associate membership, and former full members may later be promoted again.

In 2024, full members accounted for 1.7 percent of KOMCA's members and trust-contract holders. Ministry data listed 958 full members out of 55,551 in total, compared with 8.8 percent in 2007.

=== Governance ===
KOMCA's board of directors has 21 members: a president, two vice-presidents, 16 directors and two outside directors. The association also has two auditors and one outside auditor. The president, vice-presidents and directors of the 25th executive have terms from February 2026 to February 2030.

Lee Si-ha was elected KOMCA's 25th president on December 16, 2025, receiving 472 of 787 votes. Composer Kim Hyung-suk received 309 votes and six ballots were invalid. Lee began his four-year term on February 25, 2026.

KOMCA is supervised by the Ministry of Culture, Sports and Tourism as a copyright trust-management organization. Under Article 108 of the Copyright Act, the ministry can require reports, issue orders and investigate the organization's administrative and financial affairs.

== Repertoire administration and disputes ==
=== Aegukga ===
From 1992, KOMCA administered the economic rights in South Korea's national anthem, "Aegukga", on behalf of the family of its composer, Ahn Eak-tai. Royalties were collected for commercial uses including broadcasts and performances at professional baseball games. The family received an average of about ₩5.6 million a year, including about ₩8 million in 2004.

On March 16, 2005, Ahn's widow, Lolita Ahn, donated the economic rights in "Aegukga" to the Korean public. The government then asked KOMCA to remove the anthem from its trust-management repertoire, ending the collection of copyright fees for its use. The donation did not include Ahn's other works Korea Fantasy, "White Lily" and "Arirang Hill", which remained under the family's control.

The Ministry of Culture later described "Aegukga" as South Korea's first donated copyrighted work. It said commercial uses of the anthem had generated about ₩5 million to ₩10 million a year and that its economic rights would otherwise have remained protected until 2015.

=== Seo Taiji dispute ===
In 1992, musician Seo Taiji entered into a copyright trust-management agreement with KOMCA. A dispute later arose after the association gave after-the-fact approval to a recording and music video by singer Lee Jae-soo that parodied Seo's song "Come Back Home". Seo asked KOMCA not to authorize the parody and to take action against its distribution, and in January 2002 notified the association that he intended to end the agreement.

In April 2003, Seo obtained a court injunction preventing KOMCA from administering his works. KOMCA formally recognized his withdrawal effective September 1, 2006. In December 2006, Seo sued the association for about ₩460 million, claiming that it had continued administering his works and collecting royalties after the injunction.

The Seoul Central District Court rejected Seo's claim in 2008, finding that KOMCA had informed music users after the injunction that his works could no longer be used and that there was insufficient evidence that it had continued collecting royalties. In December 2009, the Seoul High Court partly reversed the ruling and ordered KOMCA to pay ₩50 million, including ₩40 million in damages and ₩10 million for emotional distress.

In July 2012, the Supreme Court overturned the appellate ruling and sent the case back to the Seoul High Court. It held that Seo's notice ending the trust agreement had not immediately returned the economic rights to him and rejected the finding that KOMCA was liable for failing to prevent unauthorized uses of his works.

On remand, the Seoul High Court ordered KOMCA to return trust income and royalties from the period between 2003, when distributions to Seo stopped, and the termination of the agreement in 2006. In May 2013, the Supreme Court upheld the ruling, requiring KOMCA to pay about ₩268 million and ending the seven-year lawsuit.

=== Starbucks background-music case ===
In 2008, KOMCA sued Starbucks Coffee Korea over music played in its stores without a licensing agreement. Starbucks argued that the recordings were covered by an exemption in the Copyright Act for commercially sold recordings. A lower court initially sided with Starbucks, but the Seoul High Court partly reversed the decision on September 9, 2010, finding that the CDs had been made specifically for Starbucks stores rather than for sale to the public.

The Supreme Court upheld the ruling on May 10, 2012. It found that the CDs did not qualify as "commercial phonograms" because they had been produced for use in Starbucks stores rather than for sale on the general market.

=== Karaoke royalty-distribution case ("idle music") ===
In late 2014, KOMCA changed its rules for distributing performance royalties from karaoke machines. The change excluded some medley and instrumental playback data recorded when music was played without customers singing, known as "idle playback" (공회전). KOMCA said an audit of 78 establishments found that including this playback could significantly reduce the royalties distributed to other songs.

In 2018, singer Seol Woon-do and 14 other copyright holders sued KOMCA over the change, arguing that it reduced the royalties they received. The Supreme Court ruled in KOMCA's favor on November 17, 2022. It found that playing the music during business hours still counted as a public performance, but that KOMCA had discretion over its distribution rules and that the change was not clearly unreasonable.

== Government oversight ==
In June 2025, the Ministry of Culture, Sports and Tourism published the results of its 2024 inspection of KOMCA and issued improvement orders concerning conflicts of interest, procurement, budget expenditure and organizational management.

The ministry reported that two officers had participated in selecting companies connected with their current or former agencies to provide services for KOMCA events between 2022 and 2024. The companies received approximately ₩39 million, while the officers and artists represented by one of the agencies received a further ₩96 million in appearance fees and sponsorship payments. One officer had also participated in evaluating contractors for a KOMCA television advertisement that used one of his compositions, from which he received approximately ₩60 million in copyright royalties.

The inspection also found that KOMCA had awarded construction contracts worth approximately ₩2.2 billion to a contractor that had no record of completed construction work and lacked the relevant licences. The association had also introduced an employee self-development budget of approximately ₩700 million without approval from its board and had not implemented a ministry order, first issued in 2018, to expand the number of full members.

KOMCA said that it would comply with the improvement orders but disputed parts of the ministry's findings. It stated that the construction contractor had originally been selected through an open competitive bidding process and that licensed subcontractors had performed the work. The association also said that the Anti-Corruption and Civil Rights Commission and external legal advisers had concluded that the officers' conduct was not covered by the applicable conflict-of-interest restrictions. KOMCA nevertheless said that it would examine deficiencies in the subcontracting process and strengthen its expenditure and documentation procedures.

Officer compensation had separately attracted regulatory criticism. According to ministry figures released in April 2025, KOMCA paid its then-president approximately ₩343 million in salary, operational expenses and travel costs during 2024. In March 2025, the association increased the president's annual salary by 79 percent, from ₩108 million to ₩193 million, and applied the increase retrospectively from January 2024. Non-executive directors received an average of approximately ₩30 million each in meeting allowances during 2024, while KOMCA had not implemented a ministry order requiring it to establish an upper limit on those payments.

KOMCA's membership and welfare system received further scrutiny during the 2025 parliamentary audit. According to materials obtained by lawmaker Lee Ki-heon, full members accounted for 1.7 percent of the association's members and trust-contract holders in 2024 but received approximately ₩2.923 billion, or 66 percent, of its ₩4.428 billion welfare expenditure. Associate members, who accounted for approximately 74 percent of the total, received about ₩74 million, or 1.6 percent.

== Korea Music Copyright Awards ==
On December 4, 2011, KOMCA held the inaugural Korea Music Copyright Awards at Olympic Hall in Seoul. The awards were created in recognition of individuals working behind the scenes (composers, editors, lyricists etc.) in the music industry. Songwriter Cho Young-soo was the first to be awarded the grand prize for earning the most royalties. Pop genre awards (ballad, dance, rock, hip-hop, and trot) were also given out, as well as awards for Korean classical music and children's songs. Pdogg, long-time producer and composer for boy group BTS, is the most awarded songwriter in this category, having won the grand prize for five consecutive years between 2019 and 2023. Bumzu won the grand prize in 2024, largely for his work with Seventeen.

== See also ==
- List of full members of the Korea Music Copyright Association
