= Ayame =

Ayame may refer to:

- Ayame (given name)
- Ayame (train), a train service in Japan
- Ayamé, Côte d'Ivoire
- LPG/C Ayame, a gas carrier ship
- Ayame, a Japanese common name for the plant Iris sanguinea

== See also ==
- Ayane (disambiguation)
