= Yoshizawa Ayame =

Yoshizawa Ayame (吉沢 菖蒲 or 芳澤 あやめ) is a stage name taken on by a series of Kabuki actors in Japan. Founded by one of the most famous onnagata (specialists in female roles) of all time, three of the four actors to succeed him were his direct relatives.

== Lineage ==
Dates indicate the period the actor held the name, with year and lunar month, not years of birth and death.

- Yoshizawa Ayame I (1700-01 – 1721-10, 1723-01 – 1729-07) — quoted in the Actors' Analects (役者論語, Yakusha Rongo), Ayame I's advice and insights into onnagata acting remains fundamental today
- Yoshizawa Ayame II (1729-09 – 1754-07) — son of Ayame I
- Yoshizawa Ayame III (1764-11 – 1774-11) — son of Ayame I
- Yoshizawa Ayame IV (1778-11 – 1792-09) — adopted son of Ayame II
- Yoshizawa Ayame V (1807-11 – 1810-08) — son of Ayame III
