= Actors' Analects =

Japanese collection of kabuki writing

Actor's Analects
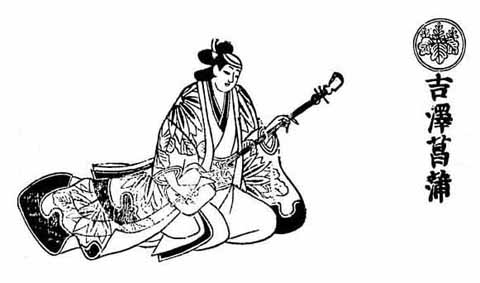
- Yoshizawa Ayame I in an illustration from the book Amayo no Sanbai Kigen (1693). The woodblock-printed characters on the right side are the actor's name.
- Author: Sugi Kuhee, Tominaga Heibee, Fukuoka Yagoshirō, Kaneko Kichizaemon
- Original title: 役者論語 (Yakusha Rongo)
- Translator: Charles Dunn and Bunzō Torigoe
- Language: Japanese
- Subject: Kabuki
- Publication date: 1776, perhaps earlier
- Publication place: Japan
- English publication date: 1969
- Media type: Woodblock printed bound volume
- ISBN: 0-231-03391-5
- OCLC: 8388222
- Dewey Decimal: 792/.0952/18
- LC Class: PN2924.5.K3 H3 1969

The Actors' Analects (役者論語, Yakusha Rongo) is a collection of 17th and early 18th century writings on the practice and aesthetics of acting in Japan's kabuki theatre form, compiled during or around the Genroku era (1688–1704). Though not providing much direct information about the origins or history of the development of kabuki in prior periods, the works collected were written at a time when many of the standards of kabuki were being established and formalized; the work thus reflects the philosophies and aesthetics of one of kabuki's most formative periods. One of the earliest extant versions was originally published in 1776, as a set of woodblock printed books in four volumes. It is unclear whether the Analects were printed as a collection before this time, but references to the "seven writings" indicate that the works were considered together as a group, even if they were not published in such a fashion, since their creation in the early 18th century.

Some of the works collected in the Analects were also printed separately, or along with other works, such as scripts for non-kabuki plays, or various other writings on advice for actors and the like. Some of these separate printings indicate that the versions found in the collected Analects are either incomplete versions, or evolved, revised versions of the original works.

The English-language title derives from the fact that 論語 (Rongo in Japanese) is the original Chinese name for what is known in English as the Analects of Confucius.

== Sections ==
- "One Hundred Items on Stage" by Sugi Kuhee, consists in fact not of one hundred, but of seven items discussed by the author, including his concern over declining standards, his advice for actors preparing for a role, and descriptions of the general types of roles. Sugi was an advisor to Sakata Tōjūrō I, one of the most influential actors of the time. Sugi advises actors to put their full energies into rehearsal, so that the role will flow naturally from them in performance. He also discusses a subject which comes up later in the Analects, that of the balance between acting for the audience and acting for the role; in other words, should the actor focus on the play as reality, acting as if it were real, or should he keep in mind what looks good from the audience's point of view? Sugi's chief example of this dilemma comes in the form of a sword fight. Does the actor point the sword at his fellow actor with the movements, attitude, and body language of one genuinely ready to fight his enemy, or as one who has memorized a set of stage movements which are meant to represent the sword fight for the audience?

Another, related, element discussed in this section is that of balancing fiction and reality onstage. Unlike Western theatre, kabuki does not seek to represent reality photographically, but rather to create a fantastic, larger-than-life world anchored in reality. Sugi's paradoxical statement that "the realism of a play springs from fiction; if a comic play is not based on real life, it is unnatural" summarizes this concept.

Aside from focusing solely on acting and roles themselves, this section and others also deal with the attitudes and behavior of actors in general, in regards to the audience and to their fellow actors. They advise against upstaging other actors and turning the drama into a competition; they also advise against not giving one's all due to the presence of a smaller audience. However, the Analects also caution against the opposite. Actors should not allow themselves to be entirely subsumed in an ensemble, and must strive to make a name for themselves. They must also seek to adapt every performance to the audience. This ties into another key difference between kabuki and Western theatre; kabuki never seeks to reproduce a performance exactly as it is written nor exactly as it was performed in the past. Every performance is a new creative endeavor.

- "Mirror for Actors" by Tominaga Heibee mainly consists of summaries of a number of plays performed at the time, many of which have been otherwise lost today, and through these provides some of the only extant descriptions of earlier forms of kabuki. He describes various customs of earlier times, as well as developments such as the (possibly erroneous) 1656 ban on men wearing certain types of women's hairstyles, and the forced closing of the theatres by the authorities on a number of occasions when such prohibitions were violated. As kabuki had its origins as being quite closely related to prostitution, the examples of earlier plays provided in this section provide a glimpse of the ways in which the theatre developed over time.
- "Words of Ayame" is the most well-known section of the Analects, and is a compilation by playwright Fukuoka Yagoshirō of sayings of Yoshizawa Ayame I, the first great onnagata. It essentially describes Ayame's advice on acting, focusing on advice for onnagata, along with Ayame's thoughts on other aspects of the theatre. Some of the key points involve advice in subsuming one's masculine tendencies and qualities into the feminine characteristics essential to a successful performance. Ayame famously lived as a woman in his private life as well in many ways, and advised the cultivation of grace and feminine characteristics offstage as well as onstage, so that the performance would flow more easily and so that other actors could more easily see the onnagata as a woman, acting more easily and freely themselves. Ayame was married with several children, but did nevertheless behave in a quite feminine manner in his offstage life. He also suggested that just as a real woman cannot become a man, an onnagata should not aspire to try their hand at male roles; this was written and compiled into the Analects before Ayame himself tried to do just that and failed miserably.

In this section, he also describes a number of different types of women roles, and the approaches an actor must have towards them. He describes, for example, the fine balance in playing a samurai's wife or another warrior woman between being proficient in combat but not seeming too masculine, as well as the keen differences between the roles of a samurai's wife, a commoner's wife, and different types or ranks of courtesans.

Ayame was famously successful for playing alongside Sakata Tōjūrō, who specialized in male leads, and elaborates on many of the same points as Sugi's "One Hundred Items" and Tōjūrō's "Dust in the Ears."

- "Dust in the Ears" is a collection, recorded by playwright Kaneko Kichizaemon, of the sayings and views of Sakata Tōjūrō.
- "Sequel to Dust in the Ears" provides anecdotes about various other actors of the period.
- "The Kengai Collection" returns to Sakata Tōjūrō, and provides, along with Dust in the Ears, great insight into the attitudes and character of the actor.
- "Sadoshima's Diary", the final element of the Analects, is something of a biography of actor Sadoshima Chōgorō.
