= Seishun Kōkō 3-nen C-gumi =

Japanese variety show

Seishun Kōkō 3-nen C-gumi (Japanese: 青春高校3年C組, Hepburn: Seishun Kōkō 3-nen C-gumi) is a Japanese variety show which began airing on TV Tokyo on 2 April 2018. The final episode aired on 1 April 2021.

== Members ==
- Ayane Konuma

== Discography ==
Their single, "Kimi no koto o mada nann ni mo shiranai" (君のことをまだ何にも知らない), was released on 22 January 2020 and charted at #7 on the Oricon Singles Chart on 3 February.
