= Ayana =

Ayana may refer to:

- Ayana (singer), female Japanese singer-songwriter
- Ayana (given name), given name (and list of people with that name)
- "Ayana" (short story), a short story by Stephen King
- Ayana (film), a 2018 Indian film
- AYANA - The Aikido Yoshokai Association of North America

== See also ==
- Ayan (disambiguation)
