= Ukifune (film) =

- Japanese movie poster
- Directed by: Teinosuke Kinugasa
- Written by: Teinosuke Kinugasa (screenplay)
- Music by: Ichirō Saitō
- Distributed by: Daiei Film
- Release date: 30 April 1957 (Japan)
- Running time: 118 minutes
- Country: Japan
- Language: Japanese

Ukifune (Japanese: 源氏物語 浮舟, Hepburn: Genji Monogatari: Ukifune) is a 1957 black-and-white Japanese film directed by Teinosuke Kinugasa. It is an adaptation of the latter part of the classic The Tale of Genji.

== Cast ==
- Kazuo Hasegawa as Kaoru-no-kimi
- Fujiko Yamamoto as Ukifune
- Raizo Ichikawa as Niō-no-miya
- Nobuko Otowa as Naka-no-kimi
- Aiko Mimasu as Chūjō
- Nakamura Ganjirō II as the Emperor
- Tamao Nakamura as Ukifune's Maid
- Yōko Uraji as Ni-no-miya
- Eijirō Yanagi as Minister of Shirafuji
- Shunji Natsume as Ukon
