= Ayane Yamazaki =

Japanese singer-songwriter

Ayane Yamazaki 山﨑彩音
- Born: 26 January 1999 (age 27); Kanagawa Prefecture, Japan
- Genres: dream pop; Shibuya-kei; city pop; new lounge
- Occupations: Pop Music Artist; singer-songwriter
- Instruments: vocal; guitar; keyboard
- Years active: 2015 –
- Labels: me and baby music; For Life Music Entertainment; AWAL
- Website: ayaneyamazaki.com

Ayane Yamazaki (Japanese: 山﨑彩音, born 26 January 1999) is a Japanese singer-songwriter. Some critics relate her with city pop, Shibuya-kei and dream pop, although her genre of music is fluid.

Ayane started her musical career around the age of 15 at music venues in Tokyo and Kanagawa. In 2015, she released her first EP Yer from the me and baby music label. The following year, 17-years-old Ayane became the youngest singer-songwriter ever to perform at the Fuji Rock Festival. She made her major label debut from the For Life Music Entertainment in 2017, then her worldwide debut from AWAL in 2019 and received good reputation in the indie music scene.

== Discography ==
Studio Albums
Released	Title	Label(s)
25 July 2018	METROPOLIS	FORLIFE SONGS
10 October 2019	LIFE	FORLIFE SONGS / AWAL
25 October 2020	Yobikakerarete (呼びかけられて)	AWAL
23 June 2021	Ribbon	FRIENDSHIP.

Extended Plays
Released	Title	Label
11 December 2015	Yer	me and baby music
26 April 2017	Kiki (キキ)	FORLIFE SONGS
