= Nakamura Ganjirō II =

Japanese actor (1902–1983)

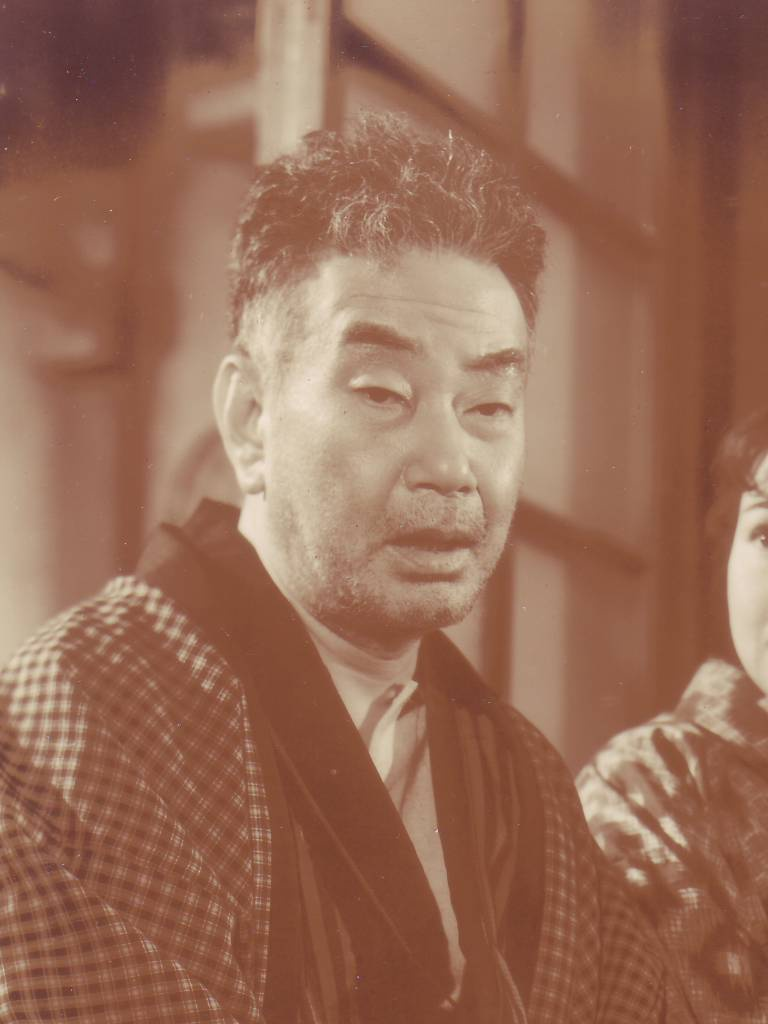
- Ganjirō in 1958
- Born: Yoshio Hayashi (Note: While the stage names of all kabuki actors have retained traditional order (Surname-Givenname) on Wikipedia, birth names of those born after the Meiji Restoration are in Western order (Givenname-Surname).); 17 February 1902; Osaka, Japan
- Died: 13 April 1983 (aged 81)
- Occupation: Actor
- Years active: 1906–1980
- Title: Living National Treasure
- Children: Sakata Tōjūrō IV (eldest son); Tamao Nakamura (youngest daughter)
- Father: Nakamura Ganjirō I
- Relatives: Nakamura Kanjaku III (grandfather); Hayashi Mataichirō II (brother); Nakamura Ganjirō IV (grandson); Nakamura Senjaku III (grandson); Nakamura Kazutarō (great-grandson); Nakamura Toranosuke (great-grandson)

Japanese name
- Kanji: 中村鴈治郎
- Hiragana: なかむら がんじろう
- Katakana: ナカムラ ガンジロウ
Transcriptions
- Romanization: Nakamura Ganjirō

Alternative Japanese name
- Kanji: 林 好雄
- Hiragana: はやし よしお
- Katakana: ハヤシ ヨシオ
Transcriptions
- Romanization: Hayashi Yoshio

Nakamura Ganjirō II (二代目 中村鴈治郎, Nidaime Nakamura Ganjirō; born Yoshio Hayashi (林 好雄, Hayashi Yoshio), 17 February 1902 – 13 April 1983) was a Japanese Kabuki and film actor. He was one of the most influential Kabuki actors in the post-World War II era, and also appeared in more than 70 films between 1941 and 1980, directed by notable filmmakers such as Yasujirō Ozu, Kenji Mizoguchi, Akira Kurosawa, and Mikio Naruse.

For his contributions to Kabuki, Nakamura was awarded the title of Living National Treasure by the Japanese government in 1967, one of several civil honours he received in his lifetime. His son, Sakata Tōjūrō IV, was also a renowned kabuki actor.

== Lineage ==
Born into a renowned Kabuki acting family from Kansai, Ganjirō II was the youngest son of Nakamura Ganjirō I, one of the most celebrated Kabuki actors from the 1870s to the 1930s and grandson of Nakamura Kanjaku III, one of the most outstanding kaneru yakusha in the history of Kabuki theater.

His older brother, Hayashi Mataichirō II was a Kabuki actor like him and was known for his spectacular and outstanding skills as a Kabuki dancer.

Ganjirō II was the second in the line of actors to inherit the prestigious name Nakamura Ganjirō (the first being his father, Nakamura Ganjirō I) and his son and his eldest grandson would also inherit the name, being known respectively as Nakamura Ganjirō III (currently Sakata Tōjūrō IV) and Nakamura Ganjirō IV.

Before being known as Nakamura Ganjirō II, he was known as Nakamura Senjaku I and his son and youngest grandson would inherit the name Nakamura Senjaku, being known respectively as Nakamura Senjaku II (currently Sakata Tōjūrō IV) and Nakamura Senjaku III.

His two great-grandsons are also Kabuki actors, Nakamura Kazutarō (son of Nakamura Ganjirō IV) and Nakamura Toranosuke (son of Nakamura Senjaku III). Due to the fact that he is the son and heir of Ganjirō IV (eldest son of Sakata Tōjūrō IV and eldest grandson of Ganjirō II) and the eldest great-grandson of Ganjirō II, Kazutarō is expected to become the head of the Kamigata branch of the Narikomaya house and inherit the name Nakamura Ganjirō V (五代目 中村鴈治郎) in a near future.

== Filmography ==
=== Film ===
Year	Title	Role	Notes
1941	The Life of an Actor		
1957	An Osaka Story	Nihei	
1957	Koto no tsume		
1957	The Lower Depths	Rokubei (Osugi's husband)	
1957	Onna goroshi abura jigoku	Father	
1957	Floating Vessel	Emperor	
1958	Tsukihime keizu		
1958	Edokko matsuri	Hikozaemon Ôkubo	
1958	Furisode matoi		
1958	The Loyal 47 Ronin	Gorobei Kakimi	
1958	Ôsaka no onna	Hanmaru Suzunoya	
1958	Enjō	Tayama Dosen	
1958	Summer Clouds	Wasuke	
1958	Mito Kômon man'yûki	Tokugawa "Mito Kōmon" Mitsukuni	
1958	Noren		
1958	Musume no boken		
1959	Kagerô-gasa	Tan'an Ogisu	
1959	Odd Obsession	Kenji Kenmochi	
1959	Denwa wa yugata ni naru		
1959	The Birth of Japan	Emperor Keikō	
1959	Floating Weeds	Komajuro (troupe leader)	
1959	Hatsuharu tanuki goten	Tanuemon	
1960	Jokyo	Gosuke	
1960	When a Woman Ascends the Stairs	Goda	
1960	The Demon of Mount Oe		
1960	Kaidan Kasane-ga-fuchi		
1960	Shirakoya Komako	Shôzaburô	
1960	Tadanao kyo gyojoki		
1960	Sen-hime goten	Tokugawa Ieyasu	
1960	Futari no musashi	Shekishusai Yagyu	
1961	Ginzakko monogatari	Seikichi Takarai	
1961	Koshoku ichidai otoko		
1961	Tokyo onigiri musume	Tsurukichi	
1961	Iro no michi oshiemasu: Yume san'ya		
1961	The End of Summer	Kohayagawa Manbei	
1961	Buda	Ashoka	
1961	Zoku akumyô	Boss of Matsushima	
1961	Wakai yatsura no kaidan	Shôkichi	
1962	Gan no tera	Nangaku Kishimoto	
1962	The Outcast	Buddha priest	
1962	Love Under the Crucifix	Sen no Rikyū	
1962	Kaidan yonaki-doro		
1962	Edo e hyaku-nana-jû ri	Sukezaemon Tsukagoshi	
1962	Tateshi Danpei	Danpei Ichikawa	
1962	Shin no shikôtei	Hsu Fu	
1962	Nakayoshi ondo: Nippon ichi dayo		
1963	An Actor's Revenge	Sansai Dobe	
1963	Onsen geisha	Kesazô	
1963	Nyokei kazoku	Uichi	
1963	Gurentai junjyôha	Ganemon	
1963	Echizen take-ningyô	Boatman	
1963	Warera sarariman		
1964	Shinobi no mono: Kirigakure Saizo	Ieyasu Tokugawa	
1964	Kwaidan	Publisher	(segment "Chawan no naka")
1964	Onsen jôi	Tahei	
1964	Gendai inchiki monogatari: Dotanuki		
1965	Onna mekura monogatari		
1966	The Pornographers	Elderly Executive From Hakucho Company	
1966	Lake of Tears	Samezaemon	
1974	Akumyo: shima arashi	Motojime	
1975	Kenji Mizoguchi: The Life of a Film Director	Himself	Documentary
1980	Tokugawa ichizoku no houkai		
1982	The Rape	Akiyama	

=== Television ===
Year	Title	Role	Notes
1979	Hissatsu Shigotonin	Shikazo	Hissatsu series

== Honors ==
- 1967 – Living National Treasure
- 1968 – Medal with Purple Ribbon
- 1974 – Order of the Sacred Treasure, 3rd class, Gold Rays with Neck Ribbon
- 1980 – Person of Cultural Merit
- 1983 – Order of the Sacred Treasure, 2nd class, Gold and Silver Star (posthumous)
- 1983 – Senior fourth rank (posthumous)
