= Amayo no Sanbai Kigen =

Illustrated book

Amayo no Sanbai Kigen (雨夜三盃機嫌) is an illustrated book depicting forty-four Kamigata kabuki actors of the time. It was originally published in 1693 as a woodblock printed book by Bokutekian and Sōgyū.

Some of the actors included are:

- Ogino Samanojō I
- Yamashita Saizaburō
- Mizuki Tatsunosuke I
- Sodeoka Masanosuke
- Tamamura Tsuyanosuke
- Yoshizawa Ayame I
- Onogawa Ugenji
- Saruwaka Kosanza
- Sodesaki Karyū I
- Sakata Tōkurō
- Iwai Heijirō
- Sodesaki Iroha
