= Ayan (soundtrack) =

Soundtrack album by Harris Jayaraj
- Released: 9 January 2009
- Recorded: 2008–2009
- Genre: Feature film soundtrack
- Length: 30:21
- Language: Tamil
- Labels: AVM Muzik; Think Music; Ayngaran Music; An Ak Audio
- Producer: Harris Jayaraj

Harris Jayaraj chronology
Vaaranam Aayiram (2008)	Ayan (2009)	Aadhavan (2009)

Ayan is the soundtrack album to the 2009 film of the same name directed by K. V. Anand and produced by AVM Productions starring Suriya and Tamannaah. The film's soundtrack featured six songs composed by Harris Jayaraj with lyrics written by Na. Muthukumar, Vairamuthu and Pa. Vijay. The soundtrack was released on 9 January 2009. The album received positive reviews from critics and Jayaraj won the Best Music Director at the 57th Filmfare Awards South and two Mirchi Music Awards including Album of the Year.

== Background ==
The film marked Harris' fourth collaboration with Suriya after Kaakha Kaakha (2003), Ghajini (2005) and Vaaranam Aayiram (2008) and his first with Anand, who worked with Vidyasagar in his previous film Kana Kandaen (2005). Anand narrated the script to Jayaraj, who at that time completed scoring Dhaam Dhoom (2008) and Vaaranam Aayiram. Jayaraj who usually preferred directors to provide one-liners and the essence of the film, listened to Anand's narration for two-and-a-half hours, where he "never felt bored even at one place". He described the script "thrilling and fun" and that reminded him of Saamy (2003), which was "a fast-paced film where you can sip your cool drink, eat popcorn and let the time whiz past." Soon after his involvement, Harris composed the songs in Mauritius.

The soundtrack album consisted of six songs with a multitude of genres, ranging from fast-paced dance to melody numbers. Vairamuthu wrote the lyrics for "Nenje Nenje" and Pa. Vijay wrote lyrics for two songs, while Na. Muthukumar wrote three numbers. "Oh Super Nova" is featured in the film's opening credits and the song "Pala Pala", sung by Hariharan is a dance number picturized for Suriya's character in the introduction. Three of the songs, were picturized on Suriya and Tamannaah's characters. "Vizhi Moodi" is a "montage" number and "Nenje Nenje" is a "soothing melody with a melancholy base"; the song was shot on the sand dunes of the Namib-Naukluft National Park, Dune 7 and Deadvlei in Namibia.

== Release ==
The film's audio was launched at the office of Sun TV Network in Chennai on 10 January 2009, with the presence of the film's cast and crew. The event had a live telecast on Sun Music. The soundtrack for the film's Telugu-dubbed version Veedokkade was released on 22 February 2009.

== Track listing ==
=== Tamil ===
Ayan (Original Version)
No.	Title	Lyrics	Singer(s)	Length
1.	"Pala Pala"	Na. Muthukumar	Hariharan	5:28
2.	"Nenje Nenje"	Vairamuthu	Harish Raghavendra, Mahathi	5:47
3.	"Honey Honey"	Pa. Vijay	Sayanora Philip, Devan Ekambaram	5:22
4.	"Vizhi Moodi"	Na. Muthukumar	Karthik, Prashanthini	5:35
5.	"Oyaayiye Yaayiye"	Pa. Vijay	Benny Dayal, Haricharan, Chinmayi	5:38
6.	"Oh Super Nova"	Na. Muthukumar	Krish	2:31
Total length:				30:21

=== Telugu ===
All tracks are written by Bhuvanachandra.

Veedokkade (Telugu Version)
No.	Title	Singer(s)	Length
1.	"Pela Pela"	Hariharan	5:24
2.	"Nene Nene Needhanne"	Harish Raghavendra, Mahathi	5:44
3.	"Honey Honey"	Sayanora Philip, Devan Ekambaram	5:21
4.	"Kallu Moosi Yochisthey"	Karthik, Prashanthini	5:53
5.	"Oyaayiye Aayiye"	Benny Dayal, Haricharan, Chinmayi	5:38
6.	"Oh Super Nova"	Krish	2:31
Total length:			30:31

== Reception ==
The soundtrack album received mostly positive reviews from music critics as well as listeners. Malathy Sundaram of Behindwoods gave the album 3 out of 5 stating, "Harris Jayaraj's crafting is elegant as ever. But what disappoints us here slightly is that the songs have influences of his earlier albums here and there, which could have been avoided." Indiaglitz gave the album 2.75 out of 5 and stated, "'Ayan' has a whole lot of mix in spellbinding melodies and mind-boggling peppy numbers." Pavithra Srinivasan of Rediff.com gave the album 2.5 out of 5 stating, "Barring one or two numbers, this effort doesn't seem to sustain itself after the first few lines, but perhaps, with repeated listening, its appeal might increase." Karthik Srinivasan in his review for Bangalore Mirror wrote "Been there, done that sound, but Ayan's soundtrack works." Malathi Rangarajan of The Hindu wrote "More than sound, Harris Jeyaraj's silence in the re-recording impact the viewer. The lyric (Vairamuthu) and tune of 'Nenjae ...' impress." A reviewer from Sify wrote "Harris Jayaraj's music is peppy and the background score is awesome."

== Accolades ==
Award	Date of ceremony (Note: Date is linked to the article about the awards held that year, wherever possible.)	Category	Recipient(s)	Result	Ref.
Filmfare Awards South	7 August 2010	Best Music Director – Tamil	Harris Jayaraj	Won	
Filmfare Awards South	7 August 2010	Best Lyricist – Tamil	Na. Muthukumar – ("Vizhi Moodi")	Won	
Filmfare Awards South	7 August 2010	Best Lyricist – Tamil	Vairamuthu – ("Nenje Nenje")	Nominated	
Filmfare Awards South	7 August 2010	Best Male Playback Singer – Tamil	Harish Raghavendra – ("Nenje Nenje")	Nominated	
Filmfare Awards South	7 August 2010	Best Male Playback Singer – Tamil	Karthik – ("Vizhi Moodi")	Nominated	
Vijay Awards	29 May 2010	Best Lyricist	Vairamuthu – ("Nenje Nenje")	Nominated	
Vijay Awards	29 May 2010	Best Male Playback Singer	Harish Raghavendra – ("Nenje Nenje")	Nominated	
Vijay Awards	29 May 2010	Favourite Song	"Vizhi Moodi"	Nominated	
Meera Isaiaruvi Tamil Music Awards	11 July 2009	Best Album of the Year	Harris Jayaraj	Won	
South Scope Awards	19 September 2010	Best Music Director – Tamil	Harris Jayaraj	Won	
South Scope Awards	19 September 2010	Best Male Playback Singer – Tamil	Harish Raghavendra – ("Nenje Nenje")	Nominated	
South Scope Awards	19 September 2010	Best Male Playback Singer – Tamil	Karthik – ("Vizhi Moodi")	Nominated	
South Scope Awards	19 September 2010	Best Female Playback Singer – Tamil	Mahathi – ("Nenje Nenje")	Nominated	
South Scope Awards	19 September 2010	Best Lyricist – Tamil	Na. Muthukumar – ("Vizhi Moodi")	Won	
Edison Awards	28 June 2009	Best Music Director	Harris Jayaraj	Won	
Mirchi Music Awards South	18 July 2010	Album of the Year – Tamil	Harris Jayaraj	Won	
Mirchi Music Awards South	18 July 2010	Listeners Choice Album of the Year – Tamil	Harris Jayaraj	Won	
