= Yoshizawa Ayame I =

Kabuki actor (1673–1729)

Yoshizawa Ayame I 初代吉沢菖蒲
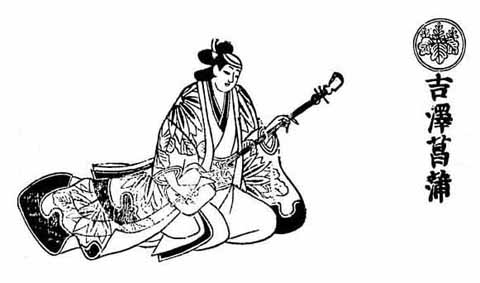
- Yoshizawa Ayame I in an illustration from the 1693 woodblock printed book Amayo no Sambai Kigen.
- Born: 1673; Kyoto, Japan
- Died: 15 July 1729; Osaka, Japan
- Other names: Yoshizawa Kikunojō, Yoshizawa Gonshichi, Shunsui, Tachibanaya

Yoshizawa Ayame I (初代 吉沢 菖蒲, Shodai Yoshizawa Ayame; 1673 – 15 July 1729) was an early Kabuki actor, and the most celebrated onnagata (specialist in female roles) of his time. His thoughts on acting, and on onnagata acting in particular, were recorded in Ayamegusa (菖蒲草, "The Words of Ayame"), one section of the famous treatise on Kabuki acting, Yakusha Rongo (役者論語, "The Actors' Analects").

A. C. Scott, professor emeritus of theater and drama at the University of Wisconsin–Madison, wrote that "Yoshizawa Ayame I was regarded as the greatest onnagata or female impersonator of his time and was an artist of ability, who developed the unique technique which was to be a model for the actors of the future. His ideas and secrets were written down in a book called 'Ayamegusa', which was afterwards regarded as the Bible of the female impersonator."

Ayame is famous for advocating that onnagata behave as women in all their interactions, both onstage and off. In Ayamegusa, he is quoted as saying that "if [an actor] does not live his normal life as if he was a woman, it will not be possible for him to be called a skillful onnagata." Following his own advice, Ayame cultivated his femininity throughout his offstage life, and was often treated as a woman by his fellow actors. His mentor, Arashi San'emon I, and others are said to have praised him on many occasions for his devotion to his art.

== Names ==
Though most commonly known as Ayame, Yoshizawa took on the stage names of Yoshizawa Kikunojō during a brief stint performing in Edo, and Yoshizawa Gonshichi when performing as a tachiyaku (in male roles). He also used the name "Gonshichi" as a nickname (替名, kaena) when patronizing a brothel or restaurant. His haimyō (俳名, "poetry name") was Shunsui, and his guild name (家名, kamei) was Tachibanaya after his mentor Tachibana Gorozaemon.

== Lineage ==
Ayame was the founder of the Yoshizawa Ayame lineage, held by at least four actors after him, mostly his biological descendants.

Ayame had four sons who followed their father in acting. They were Yoshizawa Ayame II, Yoshizawa Ayame III, Yamashita Matatarō I, and Nakamura Tomijurō I. Yoshizawa Ayame V and Yoshizawa Matatarō II were his grandsons, and Yoshizawa Iroha II was his great-grandson.

Ayame also had a number of disciples, including Yoshizawa Sengiku, Yoshizawa Takegorō, and Yoshizawa Tamazuma.

== Life and career ==
Ayame was born in Kyoto, where he was a male prostitute before becoming involved in the more legitimate theater world. Tachibana Gorozaemon, a samurai from Tanba Province, became his patron, arranging for him an apprenticeship first under shamisen player Mizushima Shirobei in the troupe of actor Arashi San'emon I, and later under San'emon himself.

Trained in the shamisen and in the ways of Kabuki, Ayame, known as Ayanosuke in his childhood, sought to learn Noh chanting and acting as well, seeking lessons from Tachibana, but was refused. His patron insisted that he focus on learning to be an onnagata, and that he not allow the study of Noh or other disciplines to corrupt his chanting, dancing, and acting style. In his early years on stage, Yoshizawa was often compared to, and outshined by, Yoshida Ayame, another onnagata actor; however, it is said that once Yoshida began taking Noh lessons, his kabuki suffered, and soon lost popularity to Yoshizawa. Yoshizawa then took on the guild name "Tachibanaya", and Tachibana's nickname "Gonshichi" as well, in honor of his patron, and in thanks for his guidance.

Ayame traveled to Edo for the first time in 1690, and performed at the Morita-za and Nakamura-za for three years. He would return to Edo again, briefly, in November 1695, performing at the Yamamura-za under the stage name Yoshizawa Kikunojō. When in Kamigata (Kyoto and Osaka), however, he always went by Ayame. Upon his return from Edo the first time, in 1693, he performed for the first time alongside tachiyaku Sakata Tōjūrō I, in the premiere of Butsumo Mayasan Kaichō by famous playwright Chikamatsu Monzaemon. Ayame and Tōjūrō would perform as partners countless times over the course of their careers.

Performing primarily in Kyoto, with some brief stints in Osaka, Ayame acted in countless plays, and became very well regarded in the Kamigata theatre world. In 1711, he was ranked in the Kyoto hyōbanki (a regular publication ranking actors and performances) as goku-jō-jō-kichi (極上上吉, extreme-superior-superior-excellent). He achieved the same ranking in Edo three years later, a rare feat considering that most actors did not see success in both Kamigata and Edo, and many did not travel between the two regions at all.

After many more successes onstage, Ayame decided, in 1721, to become a tachiyaku. He performed in male roles for two years, but was not popular in these roles, and became an onnagata once more in 1723. Later that year, he left Kyoto for the final time, settling in Osaka, and appearing onstage for the last time in 1728.

== Training ==
The playwright Fukuoka Yagoshiro, who knew Ayame personally, put down a series of training techniques that he acquired from Ayame (and others that worked with him) in a chapter titled "The Words of Ayame" that can be found in the Actors' Analects. The chapter outlines secrets that Ayame used to perfect his craft within himself and others.

1. Carefully bear in mind the softness of a woman.
2. 竜 (the Japanese character for dragon) is too strong to use in an onnagata's name.
3. Even when playing strong-willed women, one must bear in mind a soft heart.
4. One must not eat food that would make him seem unladylike.
5. Keep the audience in mind despite what would happen in the real world. Keep a balance between realism and imagination.
6. When playing a samurai's wife, one must be able to use his sword better than his husband. This represents the loyal heart within the samurai's wife.
7. The actor must live his life as a woman in order to become a truly skilled onnagata.
8. Do not become over-excited from the praise from the audience. This will cause you to repeat what was done before and thus betray the art.
9. Do not try to make the audience laugh.
10. There is no actor who can play both a man and a woman.
11. An onnagata that feels he is unable to play a woman is "ignorant of a woman's feelings."
12. An onnagata must remember to always remain feminine, while at the same time, never at complete ease.
13. An onnagata must always play the part of a virtuous woman.
14. Do not be a selfish actor.
15. Always think of giving and receiving with your partner onstage.
16. An actor should focus on one type of theatre to truly hone his craft.
17. Use your skills to make the lesser actors seem like good actors.
18. An actor must be willing to divert from a successful pattern of acting.
19. A truly successful onnagata will continue to be an onnagata even in the dressing room.
20. An actor must keep a child's heart.
21. Acting should create truth onstage.
22. Do not force a habit to go away. It will cause concentration to be lost.
23. An actor cannot allow the text to insult them personally.
24. If an onnagata is referred to as "young", it means that he did well onstage.

== Sources ==
- Dunn, Charles J.; Torigoe, Bunzō (1969). The Actors' Analects. New York: Columbia University. pp. 49–66.
- Kominz, Laurence R. (1997). The Stars who Created Kabuki. Tokyo: Kodansha International. pp. 181–223.
- Scott, Adolphe Clarence (1955). The Kabuki Theatre of Japan. George Allen & Unwin Ltd.
- Shôriya, Aragorô. "Yoshizawa Ayame I". Kabuki 21.
