= Ayan, Iran =

Ayan عيان
- Village
- Location within Iran
- Coordinates: 38°13′41″N 44°41′59″E
- Country: Iran
- Province: West Azerbaijan
- County: Salmas
- Bakhsh: Central
- Rural District: Koreh Soni

Population (2006)
  - Total: 349
- Time zone: UTC+3:30 (IRST)
  - Summer (DST): UTC+4:30 (IRDT)

Ayan (Persian: عيان, also Romanized as ‘Ayān; in Armenian: Այան) is a village in Koreh Soni Rural District, in the Central District of Salmas County, West Azerbaijan Province, Iran. At the 2006 census, its population was 349, in 76 families.
