= Nakamura Ganjirō =

Japanese kabuki actors

Nakamura Ganjirō (中村鴈治郎) is the stage name of a line of kabuki actors in Japan.

== Lineage ==
- Nakamura Ganjirō I (March 1878 – February 1935): Son of Nakamura Kanjaku III
- Nakamura Ganjirō II (January 1947 – April 1983): Son of Ganjirō I. He was active during the golden age of Japanese cinema.
- Nakamura Ganjirō III (November 1990 – November 2005): Son of Ganjirō II. He finally took the name of Sakata Tōjūrō IV.
- Nakamura Ganjirō IV (January 2015 –): Son of Ganjirō III.
