= Ayan Pal =

Indian author and public speaker (born 1980)

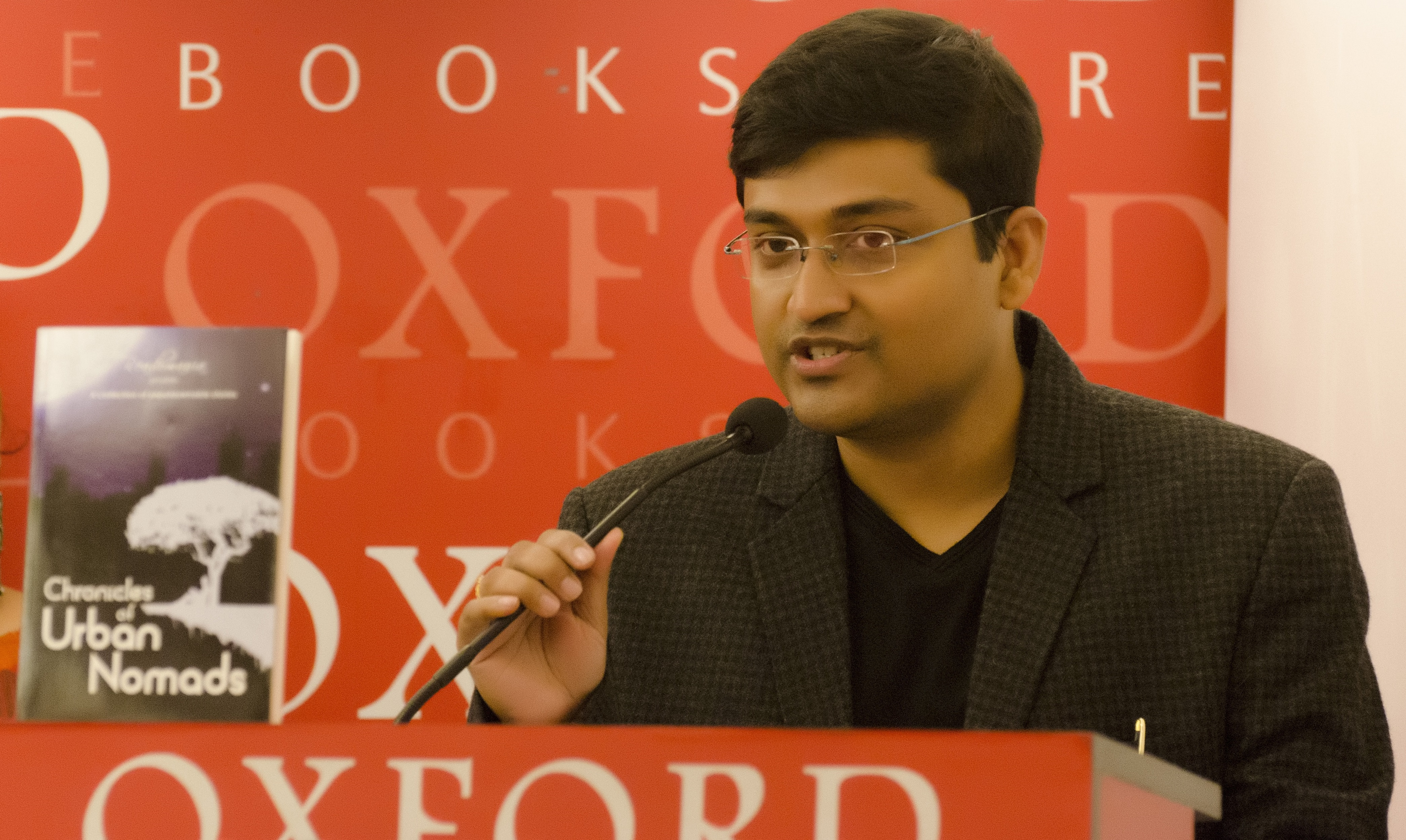
- Pal at the launch of Chronicles of Urban Nomads at the Oxford Bookstore, Kolkata.
- Born: 25 October 1980 (age 45); Calcutta, India
- Education: Dr. Ambedkar Institute of Technology (Electronics and Communication Engineering); San Diego State University (Educational Technology)
- Occupations: Author, Information Technology Consultant, Public Speaker, Educator
- Spouse: Ankana Sengupta Pal
- Children: Aadwrita Pal

Ayan Pal is an Indian Author, Information Technology Consultant, Public Speaker and Educator. He is the author of the novel Confessions on an Island and a contributor to Crossed and Knotted, a collaborative novel recognised by the Limca Book of Records as India's first composite novel.

Pal has worked at IBM, with responsibilities involving professional learning and development initiatives. He served as District Director of District 124 of Toastmasters International during 2022–2023 and received the organisation's Presidential Citation in 2025.

== Early life and Education ==
Pal was born in Calcutta (now Kolkata), India. He attended St. Joseph's College in Kolkata before pursuing a bachelor's degree in Electronics and Communication Engineering at Dr. Ambedkar Institute of Technology in Bangalore, Karnataka, affiliated with Visvesvaraya Technological University.

Pal subsequently completed a course in Educational Technology at San Diego State University in California, United States.

In October 2024, Pal completed the CXO Leadership Program through Executive Education at Cornell University, conducted in collaboration with XED. The six-month programme focused on executive leadership, strategic thinking and organisational development.

== Career ==
=== Technology Career ===
Pal has worked at IBM in Kolkata, India. In a profile published by IBM Careers, he was identified as a Global Innovation Center (GIC) Learning Consultant specialising in strategic planning and execution.

At the time of the interview, Pal headed IBM India's Centre for Advanced Studies (CAS), which facilitates collaboration with universities and research institutions. His responsibilities also included leading the IBM Consulting Academy, an internal professional development programme for IBM consultants.

His work has involved professional learning, knowledge sharing and academic collaboration, including initiatives related to artificial intelligence and emerging technologies.

In June 2024, The Telegraph identified Pal as a winner of Brandon Hall and Stevie Awards in its coverage of the Kolkata Youth Speak Forum.

=== Toastmasters and Leadership ===
Pal joined Toastmasters International in 2010 while working at IBM in Kolkata. He became a member of the IBM Blue Voice Toastmasters Club and subsequently held several leadership positions within the organisation, including serving as an area governor and division governor. He has also participated in mentoring and communication-development activities.

Pal earned the Distinguished Toastmaster (DTM) designation, the organisation's highest educational designation. A professional profile published by IBM subsequently identified him as a four-time recipient of the designation.

In May 2017, Pal won the Table Topics contest at the Toastmasters District 41 conference held in Chandigarh, India. The competition involved impromptu speaking, with participants representing clubs from northern and eastern India.

During the 2022–2023 Toastmasters programme year, Pal served as District Director of District 124, based in Kolkata, West Bengal. His appointment was documented in Toastmasters International's official District Directors publication.

In 2025, Pal received the Presidential Citation from Toastmasters International. He was listed among the recipients representing Region 8, District 124, in the organisation's official Presidential Citation records.

=== Writing ===
Pal began publishing short fiction in 2014, when his work appeared in 21 Tales to Tell, an anthology published by Notion Press following a short-story competition. He subsequently contributed to other anthologies, including Chronicles of Urban Nomads and Her Story.

In 2015, Pal contributed to Crossed and Knotted, a collaborative novel written by 13 authors. The book was subsequently recognised by the Limca Book of Records as India's first composite novel. The project, including Pal's participation, was covered by Hindustan Times in June 2016.

In 2016, Pal published his debut solo novel, Confessions on an Island. He also contributed to the anthologies Rudraksha and When They Spoke.

In 2017, Pal participated in Saptan Stories, a collaborative storytelling initiative developed by the British Council and Aardman Animations as part of the UK–India Year of Culture. Two of his contributions were included in the resulting collaborative story.

In February 2018, Hindustan Times included Pal in its feature "Five Indian short story writers to read", which highlighted his contributions to short-fiction anthologies and collaborative writing.

=== Speaking, Education and Mentoring ===
Pal has conducted workshops and participated in educational programmes focused on communication, leadership and public speaking. In August 2016, he conducted a judges' training workshop during a Toastmasters International club officers' training programme held at XLRI – Xavier School of Management in Jamshedpur, India.

In November 2021, Pal delivered a talk titled When There is a Lamp, There is a Way! at TEDxDAVSchoolU8, an independently organised TEDx event. The talk explored the influence of childhood inspiration on personal ambitions and experiences.

On 23 April 2025, Pal was among seven speakers at TEDxHITKolkata, hosted at the Heritage Institute of Technology, Kolkata, under the theme Redefining Reality. The event was documented in the Heritage Group of Institutions' newsletter.

On 25 September 2026, Pal conducted a workshop titled Member Magnet: How to Build New Members, hosted by IBM Blue Voice Toastmasters Club, affiliated with Toastmasters International District 225. The session focused on club membership development and recruitment.

His professional education activities have also included learning and development initiatives at IBM. These include his involvement with the IBM Consulting Academy and collaborations with academic and research institutions through the Centre for Advanced Studies.

== Awards and Recognition ==
- 2016 – Finalist in the Creative Writing and Humour categories of the Orange Flower Awards, organised by Women's Web.
- 2017 – Winner of the Table Topics contest at the Toastmasters International District 41 conference in Chandigarh.
- 2025 – Recipient of the Toastmasters International Presidential Citation, representing Region 8, District 124.

== Books ==
=== Novels ===
- Crossed and Knotted (Kurious Kind Media, 2015) – Collaborative novel written by 13 contributing authors.
- Confessions on an Island (Kurious Kind Media, 2016) – Solo novel.

=== Anthologies ===
- 21 Tales to Tell (Notion Press, 2014)
- Upper Cut (Red Ink Publishers, 2014)
- Her Story (Petals Publishers, 2014)
- Chronicles of Urban Nomads (Kurious Kind Media, 2014)
- Rudraksha (Kurious Kind Media, 2015)
- Long Story Short (Notion Press, 2015)
- When They Spoke (Kurious Kind Media, 2016)
- Tonight's The Night (Notion Press, 2016)
- Arranged to Love (Notion Press, 2016)
