= Minami-za =

Kabuki theatre in Kyoto

Minami-za 南座
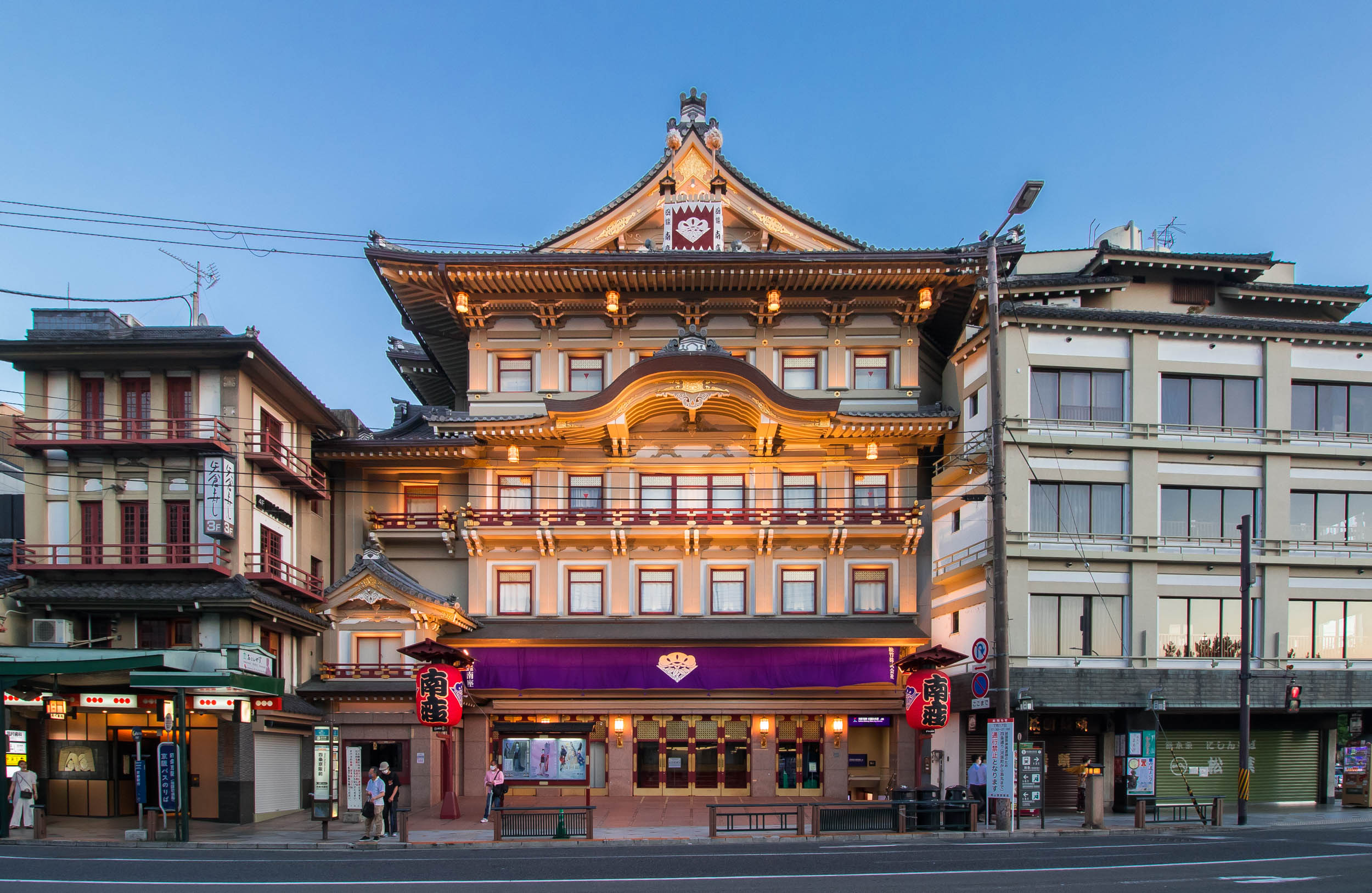
- Interactive map of Minami-za 南座
- Address: 京都市東山区四条通大和大路西入中之町198; Kyoto; Japan
- Coordinates: 35.003518°N 135.772305°E
- Owner: Shochiku
- Capacity: 1,086
- Type: Kabuki theater
- Designation: Registered Tangible Cultural Property (1996)

Website
- www.shochiku.co.jp/play/minamiza/

Minami-za (南座, Minami-za) is the primary kabuki theatre in Kyoto, Japan. It was founded in 1610 as Shijō Minami-za. The current building, with a 1,086 seat capacity, was built in 1929.

== History ==
The Minami-za is one of the earliest of the seven officially-licensed kabuki theatres built in the early Edo period (1615–1623) in the Shijo Kawara area in Kyoto; the theatre pre-dates those of Tokyo and Osaka. The current Minami-za theatre was built in 1929 in the architectural style of the Momoyama period, with a gabled roof and a traditional turret marking the official approval of the government. In 1991, after the end of the Shōwa period, the interior was drastically refurbished and modern stage mechanism was installed.

In 1996, the Minami-za was registered as a Japanese Tangible Cultural Property in respects to its historical architectural value in connection to the city of Kyoto.

== Theatre mechanism ==
The Minami-za features a number of stagecraft mechanisms unique to kabuki, such as the hanamichi (runway) and the seri (trap-door mechanism at the end of the hanamichi). The theatre also features a mawari-butai (revolving stage); all of the theatre's mechanisms were invented in playhouses during the Edo period.
