= Ayane Konuma =

Japanese tarento and musician (born 2000)

- 小沼 綺音
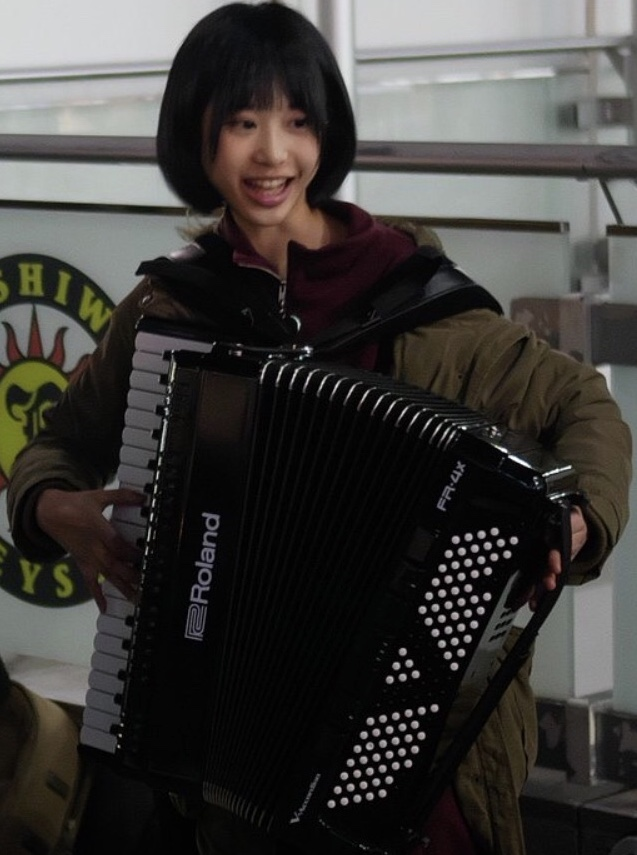
- Konuma in November 2019
- Born: March 18, 2000 (age 25); Kobe, Hyōgo Prefecture, Japan
- Other names: Nyuma (にゅま), Calonal (カロナール)
- Occupations: Tarento, musician, singer
- Years active: 2018–present
- Agent: Twin Planet
- Height: 143 cm (4 ft 8 1/2 in)
- Awards: Miss iD 2020 TOKYO Black Hole (as Calonal)

Ayane Konuma (小沼 綺音, Konuma Ayane; born March 18, 2000) is a Japanese tarento and musician who is known as the keyboard player of "Chikyū no oto (地球の音)". She is a first generation student of the Japanese TV show called Seishun Kōkō 3-nen C-gumi, airing every week on TV Tokyo, and also acts under the name of "Calonal" for Miss iD. She is represented with Twin Planet Entertainment.

== Life and career ==
As recommended by her mother, she entered and passed the audition for the first generation students of the TV show, "Seishun Kōkō 3-nen C-gumi", produced by Yasushi Akimoto and TV Tokyo, in 2018 during her high school days. About a month later, as part of club activities in the program, she joined the light music club called "Hey! school" and became a keyboard player. They subsequently formed a new band "Chikyū no oto", which means "Sound of the earth" in Japanese.

In 2019, she walked in the Tokyo Girls Collection show as the muse for a fashion brand at Studio Coast. On August 16, the theater performance at the 4th studio in TV Tokyo she presides played to full houses and the seats were filled, which drew the largest number of standees in history, 40. On November 23, under the name of "Calonal", she won a TOKYO Black Hole Award from around 3,500 applicants who attended the auditions at Miss iD 2020, which has been hosted by Kodansha.

On January 22, 2020, the light music club released their debut single, "Sukinara Yeah!Yeah!Yeah!(好きならYeah!Yeah!Yeah!)", for a B-side track with the idol girl group club for the A-side track after Seishun Kōkō 3-nen C-gumi signed a contract with EMI Records (a subsidiary of Universal Music Japan). It debuted and peaked at number 7 on the Oricon weekly chart.

== Works ==
=== Television ===
- Seishun Kōkō 3-nen C-gumi (TV Tokyo, 2018/5/21 - )

=== Webcast ===
- Neko-Jita Showroom (Showroom, 2020/5/12)

=== Stage ===
- Seishun Kōkō 3-nen C-gumi Cultural Festival (Tokyo Fuji University, 2018/8/27)
- Seishun Kōkō 3-nen C-gumi Winter Live (Nakano Sunplaza, 2018/12/26)
- Seishun Kōkō 3-nen C-gumi Performance at the theater (KeyStudio in Shinjuku ALTA, 2019/2/28 - 5/26)
- Seishun Kōkō 3-nen C-gumi Spring Live - 2019 Graduation - (the 1st studio in TV Tokyo, 2019/3/29)
- Seishun Kōkō 3-nen C-gumi Performance at the studio (the 4th studio in TV Tokyo, 2019/5/29 - )
- Seishun Kōkō 3-nen C-gumi Debut Kickoff Live (Toyosu PIT, 2019/8/28)
- Seishun Kōkō 3-nen C-gumi Live Televised Event celebrating the release of our major debut single (Venus Fort, 2020/1/22)

=== Modeling ===
- TGC teen 2019 Summer (Studio Coast, 2019/7/29)

=== Magazines ===
- Weekly Playboy (Shueisha, 2019/8/26)
- mercari MAGAZINE (Mercari, 2020/3/9)
- Top Yell NEO (Takeshobo, 2020/3/28)

=== Advertisements ===
- LINE LIVE Poster (JOL Harajuku, 2020/6/1 - 6/14)

=== Live performances ===
Chikyū no oto

- ALL I NEED IS YOU (Kōenji Club ROOTS, 2019/10/11)
- Nice to meet you from Chikamatsu. I'm Rikako Ōya! vol.5 (Shimokitazawa Chikamatsu, 2019/11/27)
- The mini-live and attraction meeting celebrating the release of our major debut single (Event venues in southern Kantō region, 2019/12/8 - 2020/1/26)
- The project by the Radio-Cassettes "Time to listen to the radio" (Kichijōji Warp, 2020/1/12)

=== Events ===
Calonal

- Miss iD's Room for Semifinalists - First Night - (LOFT9 Shibuya, 2019/8/26)
- Miss iD 2020 Festival - Graduation - (Kodansha, 2019/11/23)
- Miss iD 2020 Closing Party (TOKYO CULTURE CULTURE, 2019/12/10)
- Miss iD Cafe (Oto no ha Café, 2020/2/16)

Chikyū no oto

- New Year's Party and Attraction Meeting (Ikebukuro Marui, 2020/1/5)

== Awards ==
Calonal

- Miss iD 2020 TOKYO Black Hole (Kodansha, 2019/11/23)

== Discography ==
=== Singles ===
No.	Title	Artist	Release date	Peak chart positions	
No.	Title	Artist	Release date	JPN Oricon	JPN Hot 100
1	I don't know anything about you yet (君のことをまだ何も知らない)	the idol girl group club	January 22, 2020	7	42
1	Never ending time	All students	January 22, 2020	7	42
1	Sukinara Yeah!Yeah!Yeah! (好きならYeah!Yeah!Yeah!)	Chikyū no oto	January 22, 2020	7	42
2	I like you (好きです)	the idol girl group club	July 29, 2020	-	-
2	I had been unable to meet you for a time (ずっと会えなかった)	All students	July 29, 2020	-	-
2	Own song (自分のうた)	Chikyū no oto	July 29, 2020	-	-
