= Wagoto =

Japanese kabuki acting style

Wagoto (和事), or soft style, is a style of kabuki acting that emphasizes realistic speech and gestures. Wagoto actors typically do not employ the exaggerated makeup and costuming common to the more exaggerated aragoto (rough) style.

Wagoto was pioneered by Sakata Tōjūrō I, an actor in the Kamigata (Osaka-Kyoto) region. Plays that emphasize wagoto roles are typically tragic romances. Famous plays that emphasize wagoto roles include Sonezaki Shinjū (The Love Suicides at Sonezaki) and Kuruwa Bunshō (Tales of the Licensed Quarter).

Wagotoshi refers to Kabuki actors who specialize in wagoto roles. Notable wagotoshi include Bandō Kakitsu I and Matsumoto Kōshirō VII.

== See also ==
- Aragoto
