= Kamigata =

Colloquial term for Kansai, Japan

Kamigata (上方) was the colloquial term for a region today called Kansai (kan, barrier; sai, west) in Japan. This large area encompasses the cities of Kyoto, Osaka, and Kobe. The term was also sometimes used to refer only to Kyoto city. The term is used particularly when discussing elements of Edo period urban culture such as ukiyo-e and kabuki, and when making a comparison to the urban culture of the Edo/Tokyo region. The term was no longer used as name for the Kansai provinces when Emperor Meiji moved to Edo in 1868. An account described Kamigata suji as one of the two regions that emerged from the division of Japan for the purpose of taxation with the other being Kwanto-suji.

Kabuki, ukiyo-e, and many of the other related fields of popular and urban culture of the Edo period in fact originated in Kamigata before being transmitted to Edo. The vast majority of scholarship on the urban culture of the Edo period (1603–1867), even today, focuses on culture in Edo; Kamigata culture, though it is beginning to be studied more and more, and represented in museum exhibits more often as well, remains very much overshadowed.

== Theatre ==
Kabuki, like many other traditional arts, originated in the Kamigata area, particularly Kyoto, which also perfected the wagoto (gentler style of acting) school. It grew out of Noh theatre and traditional Shinto dances, and was originally much more a dance form than drama. After periods of women's kabuki (onna kabuki) and young men's kabuki (wakamono kabuki), in which the dancers/actors were also prostitutes, and thus various proscriptions were put into place, including the banning of women from the stage, men's kabuki (yarō kabuki), the beginnings of what is considered today the mainstream form of kabuki, emerged.

Sakata Tōjūrō (1647–1709) was one of the first actors in this new form, and an extremely influential one in shaping Kamigata kabuki. He pioneered the wagoto style in the plays of Chikamatsu Monzaemon. It a soft, emotional, and naturalistic style of theatre, which would stand in sharp contrast to the bombastic, bold aragoto style created by his contemporary in Edo, Ichikawa Danjūrō I. The aesthetics and philosophy of wagoto would continue to shape and define Kamigata kabuki from then on, and actors from the two regions would more often than not experience great difficulties in adapting to the styles of the opposite region, and appealing to their audiences. Kamigata style uses fewer stage tricks (keren) than Edo kabuki, and more subdued makeup, costuming, props and sets. In addition to its more naturalistic and realistic style, Kamigata kabuki was originally far more strongly influenced by jōruri, the puppet theatre of Osaka, and thus to some extent, laid greater importance upon plot than did Edo kabuki, which focused far more heavily on dance. It is not uncommon even today, particularly in Tokyo (Edo), for Kabuki performances to include completely disparate stories and characters inserted, at detriment to the plot's continuity, for the purpose of showing off an actor's dancing, mie posing, chanting, costumes or stage tricks.

Later in the Edo period, actors began to travel more often between the two regions, influencing one another's styles, and introducing elements of each region's style and repertoire to the other. However, the two regions never ceased to be distinctly different, and to maintain their respective stylistic and aesthetic foundations.

Today, kabuki is on the wane across the country, but remains more popular and thus more stable in Tokyo. Only one theatre remains in Kyoto, the Minami-za, while a handful remain in Osaka; the Naka no Shibai closed in 1999. Among the top actors onstage in Kamigata today are Nakamura Ganjirō III and his sons Nakamura Senjaku III and Nakamura Kanjaku V, Kataoka Hidetarō II, Bandō Takesaburō V and Kamimura Kichiya VI. A number of other Kamigata actors now perform in Tokyo.

== Ukiyo-e ==
The ukiyo-e art of the Kamigata area, for a long time consisted primarily of woodblock printed illustrated books (such as Amayo no Sanbai Kigen) and paintings. Single-sheet prints depicting kabuki actors, landscapes, or beautiful women (bijinga), popular in Edo beginning around 1700 did not become common in Kamigata until roughly one hundred years later.

When kabuki prints became popular in Kamigata at the end of the 18th century, they represented a significant departure from actor prints of Edo. Though the very idea of selling single-sheet prints of actors was inspired by the medium's success in Edo, the tastes of the artists, their customers, and the kabuki being represented were decidedly different. One key stylistic element of Kamigata prints is their realism, relative to those of Edo. Kamigata prints, particularly those of onnagata (male actors in female roles), sought to represent the actor's true appearance. Unlike Edo actors who seemed to never age in prints, and to be just as graceful and slight as if they were actual young women, Kamigata actors showed their age, their chubby figures, and their mannish features in prints.

Another interesting feature of the ukiyo-e scene in Kamigata was the relative lack of formal publishing houses dominating the art world. In Edo, prints were produced only of the top actors, and largely if not exclusively by dedicated publishers commissioned by individual theatres. Kamigata's art world was driven much more so by the literati, and by what were in essence actor fan clubs. Fans produced their own prints, and often their own performances as well.

Kamigata publishers were divided into two main types: shomotsuya, who distributed the same range of books as Edo publishers with the addition of edehon (model books intended to inspire artists, a genre little diffused in Edo), and soshiya, who printed material similar to that of the Edo jihonya but whose circulation remained confined to the local area. Beyond the range of subject matter, the two regions differed enormously in the sheer volume of the printing industry: Edo output outstripped that of Osaka by a margin of at least twenty to one, and only a small number of Osaka artists, unlike their Edo counterparts, were able to make a living principally from printmaking. This largely "amateur" status of Osaka's highly skilled print designers, who produced prints as a form of promotion for their favourite actors rather than as a livelihood, gave rise to a genre of engraving unique to the region.

The most celebrated Osaka printmaker of the time was Ryūkōsai Jokei (fl. c. 1772-1816), who produced almost exclusively actor prints in the hosoban format. Influencing, and influenced by, the great Edo printmaker Sharaku, Ryūkōsai is one of the very few Kamigata artists to be mentioned in most Edo-focused scholarship on ukiyo-e. His students included Shōkōsai Hanbei and Urakusai Nagahide, who were in turn followed by a number of other print masters. Gion Seitoku and Mihata Jōryū were two of the most prominent Kamigata ukiyo-e painters, influenced largely by the Shijō school of painting, based in Kyoto.

Kamigata ukiyo-e is especially known for its surimono, privately commissioned prints of a far higher quality than regular prints. Though surimono were produced in Edo as well, it was not at all uncommon for Edo artists to sub-contract their surimono commissions to Kamigata artists. These prints, often handpainted, with inscribed calligraphy, and/or gold, silver, or mica used to enhance the image, were commissioned largely by literati and the like, and were closely related to the Kamigata development of poetry circles. Literati, artists, writers, and kabuki actors would gather to drink, relax, and share poetry; haiku competitions and renga chain collaborations were common forms of entertainment at these meetings, and the poems would often come to be included in surimono depicting the actor who composed them (or a poem could be composed for an actor). Sometimes the calligraphy on the print would even be done by the actor himself. These styles and motifs, combining actors with poetry and calligraphy, were used not only for the privately commissioned surimono, but also for woodblock printed books. In addition to being purchased by literati or kabuki fans for their own entertainment, these prints or books were often commissioned by these poetry circles, or by their members, as gifts to their members or their esteemed guests, such as artists or actors from Edo.

== Pleasure districts ==
The Shinmachi in Osaka and Shimabara in Kyoto arose shortly after Edo's Yoshiwara, all three established by the Tokugawa shogunate, alongside the theatre districts, to centralize and control these entertainment districts. The pleasure quarters quickly came to be centers of popular culture in general, and the refined world of the courtesans began to attract literati types, along with artists and writers. This can be demonstrated in the way the pleasure districts in Edo and Kamigata figured prominently in plays that became popular particularly during the 18th and 19th centuries such as Brilliance and Bravado, Message of Love, Five Great Powers, Ise Dances and Taihei Chronicles. Female and male prostitutes also became the subjects of popular fiction, songs, pictorial art, and even travel guides. A dance style called kamigata uta also emerged, which was associated with the renowned geisha hanamachi of Gion.

As was the case with ukiyo-e, the theatre, and other aspects of popular culture, the pleasure districts (yukaku) of Kamigata were markedly different from those in Edo, in culture and style, if not in organization and administration. For instance, Kamigata's yukaku had a more creative atmosphere than the pleasure districts that thrived in Edo because this city was more heavily regulated on account of its status as a political center dominated by warriors and their families.

== Bibliography ==
- Lane, Richard. (1978). Images from the Floating World, The Japanese Print. Oxford: Oxford University Press. ISBN 9780192114471; OCLC 5246796
