= Chishū Ryū =

Japanese actor (1904–1993)

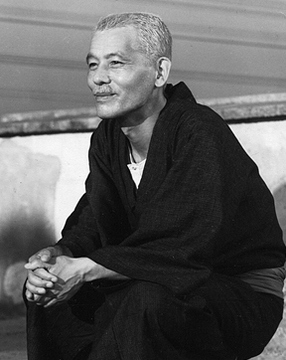
- Ryū in Tokyo Story (1953)
- Born: May 13, 1904; Tamamizu, Kumamoto, Japan
- Died: March 16, 1993 (aged 88); Yokohama, Kanagawa, Japan
- Other name: Chishuu Ryuu
- Occupation: Actor
- Years active: 1928–1992

Japanese name
- Kanji: 笠 智衆
- Hiragana: りゅう ちしゅう
Transcriptions
- Romanization: Ryū Chishū

Chishū Ryū (笠 智衆, Ryū Chishū; May 13, 1904 – March 16, 1993) was a Japanese actor, whose career spanned 65 years and over 230 film and television productions. He was best known for his collaborations with director Yasujirō Ozu, whom he worked with on at least 32 films.

== Early life ==
Ryū was born in Tamamizu Village, Tamana County, a rural area of Kumamoto Prefecture in Kyushu, the most southerly and westerly of the four main islands of Japan. His father was chief priest of Raishōji (来照寺), a temple of the Honganji School of Pure Land Buddhism. Ryū attended the village elementary school and a prefectural middle school before entering the Department of Indian Philosophy and Ethics at Tōyō University to study Buddhism. His parents hoped he would succeed his father as priest of Raishōji, but Ryū had no wish to do so and in 1925 dropped out of university and enrolled in the acting academy of the Shōchiku motion picture company's Kamata Studios. Shortly afterwards, his father died and Ryū returned home to take on the role of priest. Within half a year or so, however, he passed the office to his older brother and returned to Kamata.

== Career ==
For about ten years, he was confined to walk-on parts and minor roles, often uncredited. During this time he appeared in the first of fourteen films directed by Yasujirō Ozu, beginning with the college comedy Dreams of Youth (1928). His first big part was in Ozu's College is a Nice Place (1936) and he made his mark as an actor in Ozu's The Only Son (also 1936), playing a failed middle-aged school-teacher in spite of the fact that he was only 32. This was his break-through role, and he then began to get major parts in other directors' films. He first played the lead in Torajirō Saitō's Aogeba tōtoshi (仰げば尊し 1937). His first leading role in an Ozu film was in the There Was a Father (父ありき 1942). This was another "elderly" part: he played the father of Shūji Sano, who was only seven years his junior. He was by then undoubtedly Ozu's favourite actor: he eventually appeared in at least 32 of Ozu's 54 films and shorts. He had a role (not always the lead) in every one of Ozu's post-war movies, from Record of a Tenement Gentleman (1947) to An Autumn Afternoon (1962). He played his most famous "elderly" role in Tokyo Story (1953).

Ryū appeared in well over 100 films by other directors. He was in Keisuke Kinoshita's Twenty-four Eyes (1954) and played wartime Prime Minister Kantarō Suzuki in Kihachi Okamoto's Japan's Longest Day (1967). From 1969 until his death in 1993, he played a curmudgeonly but benevolent Buddhist priest in more than forty of the immensely popular It's Tough Being a Man (Otoko wa tsurai yo) series starring Kiyoshi Atsumi as the lovable pedlar/conman Tora-san. Ryū parodied this role in Jūzō Itami's comedy The Funeral (1984). Ryū's last film was It's Tough Being a Man: Torajirō's Youth (男はつらいよ 寅次郎の青春: Otoko wa tsurai yo: Torajirō no seishun 1992).

Between 1965 and 1989 he appeared in about 90 TV productions.

== Accent ==
Ryū retained the rural Kumamoto accent of his childhood throughout his life. It may have held him back early in his career, but became part of his screen persona, denoting reliability and simple honesty. When the columnist Natsuhiko Yamamoto published a deliberately provocative piece called "I Can't Stand Chishū Ryū", in which he derided Ryū's accent, there was a furious reaction, and his magazine Shūkan Shinchō (週刊新潮) was inundated with letters of protest.

== Selected filmography ==
- Dreams of Youth (Ozu, 1928)
- Wife Lost (Ozu, 1928)
- Days of Youth (Ozu, 1929)
- I Flunked, But ... (Ozu, 1930)
- That Night's Wife (Ozu, 1930)
- I Was Born, But... (Ozu, 1932)
- Where now are the Dreams of Youth? (Ozu, 1932)
- Dragnet Girl (Ozu, 1933)
- Woman of Tokyo (Ozu, 1933)
- Passing Fancy (Ozu, 1933)
- A Story of Floating Weeds (Ozu, 1934)
- A Mother should be Loved (Ozu, 1934)
- An Inn in Tokyo (Ozu, 1935)
- College is a Nice Place (Ozu, 1936)
- The Only Son (Ozu, 1936)
- A Brother and His Younger Sister (Yasujirō Shimazu, 1939)
- The Story of Tank Commander Nishizumi (Kōzaburō Yoshimura, 1940)
- Ornamental Hairpin (Hiroshi Shimizu, 1941)
- Brothers and Sisters of the Toda Family (Ozu, 1941)
- There Was a Father (Ozu, 1942)
- Army (Keisuke Kinoshita, 1944)
- Record of a Tenement Gentleman (Ozu, 1947)
- A Hen in the Wind (Ozu, 1948)
- Late Spring (Ozu, 1949)
- The Munekata Sisters (Ozu, 1950)
- Home Sweet Home (Noboru Nakamura, 1951)
- Early Summer (Ozu, 1951)
- Carmen Comes Home (Keisuke Kinoshita, 1951)
- The Flavor of Green Tea over Rice (Ozu, 1952)
- Tokyo Story (Ozu, 1953)
- Twenty-Four Eyes (Keisuke Kinoshita, 1954)
- She Was Like a Wild Chrysanthemum (Keisuke Kinoshita, 1955)
- Arashi (Hiroshi Inagaki, 1956)
- Early Spring (Ozu, 1956)
- Tokyo Twilight (Ozu, 1957)
- Rickshaw Man (Hiroshi Inagaki, 1958)
- Equinox Flower (Ozu, 1958)
- Good Morning (Ozu, 1959)
- Floating Weeds (Ozu, 1959)
- Late Autumn (Ozu, 1960)
- The Bad Sleep Well (Akira Kurosawa, 1960)
- The Human Condition III: A Soldier's Prayer (Masaki Kobayashi, 1961)
- The Last War (Shūe Matsubayashi, 1961)
- The End of Summer (Ozu, 1961)
- An Autumn Afternoon (Ozu, 1962)
- Love Under the Crucifix (Kinuyo Tanaka, 1962)
- Red Beard (Akira Kurosawa, 1965) - Mr. Yasumoto
- Japan's Longest Day (Kihachi Okamoto, 1967) - Prime Minister Baron Kantaro Suzuki
- The Human Bullet (Kihachi Okamoto, 1968)
- Otoko wa Tsurai yo (Yoji Yamada, 1969; and 42 other films in this series, 1969–1991)
- Battle of the Japan Sea (1969) as Maresuke Nogi
- Where Spring Comes Late (Yoji Yamada, 1970)
- Castle of Sand (Yoshitarō Nomura, 1974)
- Lanterns on Blue Waters (Akio Jissoji, 1983)
- The Funeral (Juzo Itami, 1984)
- Tokyo-Ga (Wim Wenders documentary about Ozu & Tokyo, 1985)
- Mishima: A Life in Four Chapters (Paul Schrader, 1985)
- Sorekara (1985)
- Final Take (1986)
- A Taxing Woman's Return (Juzo Itami, 1988)
- Dreams (Akira Kurosawa, 1990)
- Until the End of the World (Wim Wenders, 1991)
- Luminous Moss (Kei Kumai, 1992)

== Awards ==
- 1949: Mainichi Film Concours - Best Actor (Te o Tsunagu Kora)
- 1951: Blue Ribbon Award – Best Supporting Actor (Home Sweet Home)
- 1952: Mainichi Film Concours - Best Actor (Inochi Uruwashi)
- 1967: Medal with Purple Ribbon
- 1971: Mainichi Film Concours - Best Supporting Actor (Where Spring Comes Late)
- 1975: Order of the Rising Sun, 4th Class, Gold Rays with Rosette
- 1987: Kikuchi Kan Prize
- 1990: Kawakita Award
- 1991: Mainichi Film Concours - Special Award
- 1994: Elan d'or Awards - Special Award
- 1994: Japan Academy Prize - Special Award
