= A Brother and His Younger Sister =

1939 Japanese film

- Film poster
- 兄とその妹
- Directed by: Yasujirō Shimazu
- Written by: Yasujirō Shimazu
- Starring: Shin Saburi; Kuniko Miyake; Michiko Kuwano; Ken Uehara
- Cinematography: Toshio Ubukata
- Music by: Hikaru Saotome
- Production company: Shochiku
- Distributed by: Shochiku
- Release date: 1 April 1939 (Japan)
- Running time: 104 minutes
- Country: Japan
- Language: Japanese

A Brother and His Younger Sister (Japanese: 兄とその妹, Hepburn: Ani to sono imoto), also titled An Older Brother and His Younger Sister, is a 1939 Japanese comedy-drama film written and directed by Yasujirō Shimazu. Together with Our Neighbor, Miss Yae (1934), it is regarded as one of Shimazu's major films, and a representative of the shōshimin-eiga genre.

== Plot ==
Office worker Mamiya regularly returns home late from playing go with his employer Mr. Arita. Not only do his wife Akiko and his younger sister Fumiko, who lives with them, comment on this, his habit is also the talk of his colleagues. Mamiya's envious colleague Yukita schemes against him behind his back by alleging that Mamiya is an informer for Arita.

Arita asks Mamiya to negotiate between his nephew Michio and Fumiko, whom Michio wants to propose to. When the self-confident Fumiko refuses the proposal, Mamiya accepts her decision, but Yukita spreads the rumour that Mamiya uses his sister to appease Arita.

On the day of his promotion as head of the department, Mamiya is attacked by former accountant Hayashi, whom Yurita made believe that he lost his position due to Mamiya's informings. When Yukita's scheme is revealed, Mamiya slaps him and resigns from his job. Mamiya, uncertain how to deliver the bad news to Akiko, visits his former colleague Utsumi, who now runs his own company. Utsumi offers Mamiya to work for him in Manchuria, as his company is expanding. Mamiya accepts and resettles to Manchuria with Akiko and Fumiko.

== Cast ==
- Shin Saburi as Keisuke Mamiya
- Kuniko Miyake as Akiko Mamiya
- Michiko Kuwano as Fumiko
- Ken Uehara as Michio Arita
- Reikichi Kawamura as Fujio Gyoda
- Ryōtarō Mizushima as Soroku Shimura
- Chishū Ryū as Seisaburo Utsumi
- Ichirō Sugai as Kiyoshi Arakawa
- Takeshi Sakamoto as Mr. Arita

== Release and reception ==
A Brother and His Younger Sister was released in Japan on 1 April 1939. It ranked #4 in Kinema Junpo's list of the ten best Japanese films of 1939.

== Legacy ==
In later years, A Brother and His Younger Sister has been shown at film museums and institutions such as the Berkeley Art Museum and Pacific Film Archive in 1985 and the Museum of Modern Art in 2022.
