= Kuniko Miyake =

Japanese actress (1916–1992)

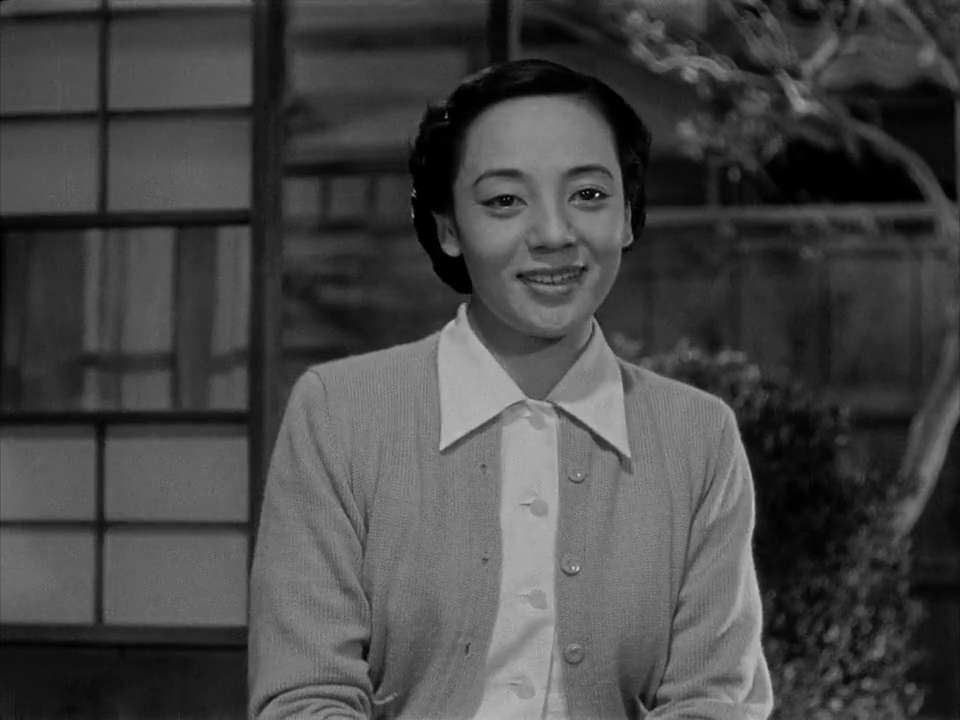
- Kuniko Miyake in Early Summer
- Born: Yasu Miura; 17 September 1916; Iwatsuki, Saitama, Japan
- Died: 4 November 1992 (aged 76); Japan
- Occupation: Actress
- Years active: 1934–1991

Kuniko Miyake (三宅 邦子, Miyake Kuniko; 17 September 1916 – 4 November 1992) was a Japanese actress. She appeared in nearly 200 films between 1934 and 1991.

== Biography ==
Miyake was born Yasu Miura in Iwatsku City, Saitama Prefecture. After graduating from Saitama Prefectural Kuki High School, she joined the Shochiku film studios in 1934 and made her film debut the same year with Yume no sasayaki. After World War II, she also appeared in productions by Toho, Daiei and other film studios. Miyake starred in many films directed by Yasujirō Ozu, including Late Spring and Tokyo Story. She also frequently appeared in television dramas.

== Selected filmography ==
Year	Title	Director
1937	The Golden Demon	Hiroshi Shimizu
1939	A Brother and His Younger Sister	Yasujirō Shimazu
1941	Brothers and Sisters of the Toda Family	Yasujirō Ozu
1948	The Portrait	Keisuke Kinoshita
1949	Flame of My Love	Kenji Mizoguchi
1949	Late Spring	Yasujirō Ozu
1950	Arupusu monogatari Yasei	Tsutomu Sawamura
1950	Battle of Roses	Mikio Naruse
1951	Early Summer	Yasujirō Ozu
1951	Chichi Koishi	Shunkai Mizuho
1952	Hibari no Sākasu Kanashiki Kobato	Mizuho Shunkai
1952	The Flavor of Green Tea over Rice	Yasujirō Ozu
1953	Tokyo Story	Yasujirō Ozu
1953	The Wild Geese	Shiro Toyoda
1955	Hotaru no Hikari	Kazuo Mori
1956	Early Spring	Yasujirō Ozu
1956	The Rose on His Arm	Keisuke Kinoshita
1957	Suzakumon	Kazuo Mori
1957	The Blue Sky Maiden	Yasuzo Masumura
1959	Good Morning	Yasujirō Ozu
1960	Late Autumn	Yasujirō Ozu
1962	An Autumn Afternoon	Yasujirō Ozu
1962	Love Under the Crucifix	Kinuyo Tanaka
1968	The Snake Girl and the Silver-Haired Witch	Noriaki Yuasa
1986	Gonza the Spearman	Masahiro Shinoda
1991	Until the End of the World	Wim Wenders
