= Shin Saburi =

Japanese actor (1909–1982)

- Shin Saburi in Equinox Flower (1958)
- Born: Yoshio Ishizaki; 12 February 1909; Utashinai, Hokkaidō, Japan
- Died: 22 September 1982 (aged 73); Japan
- Other name: Gen Shimazu
- Occupations: Actor, film director
- Years active: 1931–1982
- Awards: Mainichi Film Award for Best Actor; Blue Ribbon Award for Best Newcomer

Shin Saburi (佐分利信, Saburi Shin; 12 February 1909 – 22 September 1982) was a Japanese actor and film director.

== Biography ==
Shin Saburi was born Yoshio Ishizaki in Utashinai, Hokkaidō, Japan. He made his acting debut in 1931 and started working for the Shochiku studio in the mid-1930s, where he became one of the studio's biggest stars. He regularly starred in the films of director Yasujirō Ozu, including Brothers and Sisters of the Toda Family (1941), The Flavor of Green Tea over Rice (1952), Equinox Flower (1958) and Late Autumn (1960). He also appeared in films by Yasujirō Shimazu (A Brother and His Younger Sister, 1939), Hiroshi Shimizu (The Masseurs and a Woman, 1939), and Heinosuke Gosho (Burden of Life, 1935, Hunting Rifle, 1961). In addition, he directed over a dozen films himself, receiving the Blue Ribbon Award for Best Newcomer for his directorial debut in 1950.

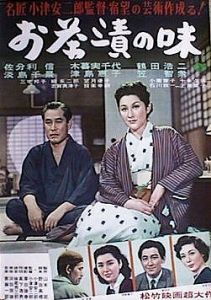
Japanese movie poster of The Flavor of Green Tea over Rice, starring Shin Saburi and Michiyo Kogure .

== Selected filmography ==
=== Film ===
- 1931: Misu nippon as San-chan
- 1931: Hokuman no teisatsu
- 1932: Minato no jojōshi as Shinoshima
- 1932: Sōretsu bakudn sanyūshi
- 1932: Saraba Tokyo
- 1932: Kiri no yo no kyakumā
- 1933: Joseijin
- 1935: Akogare
- 1935: Burden of Life as Kōsei Hashimoto
- 1936: Kanjō sanmyaku
- 1936: Kazoku kaigi
- 1936: Woman of the Mist as Doctor
- 1936: Dansei tai josei as Yukio, Atsumi's first son
- 1936: Hitozuma tsubaki
- 1936: The New Road (part 1 and 2) as Toru Nogami
- 1937: Kōjō no tsuki as Miura
- 1937: Shu to midori
- 1937: Joi Kinuyo sensei as Yasuo Asano
- 1937: The Golden Demon as Jōsuke Arao
- 1937: Konyaku sanbagarasu as Shin Miki
- 1937: Otoko no tsugunai kohen/Otoko no tsugunai zenpen
- 1937: Shingun no uta
- 1938: Shuppatsu
- 1938: Han-shojo as Sōkichi Maeda
- 1938: Mother and Child
- 1938: The Masseurs and a Woman as Shintarō О̄mura
- 1938: Aizen katsura as Hattori
- 1938: Katei nikki as Shūzō Ubukata
- 1939: Minamikaze as Michio Nito
- 1939: A Brother and His Younger Sister
- 1939: Zoku aizen katsura as Hattori
- 1939: Hana no aru zassō as Mr. Hiramatsu
- 1939: Aizen katsura – Kanketsu-hen as Hattori
- 1939: Warm Current as Yuzo Hibiki
- 1940: Kinuyo no hatsukoi as Shoichiro Kiriyama
- 1940: Seisen aiba fu: Akatsuki ni inoru
- 1940: Tokai no honryu as Keichi Hatta
- 1940: The Story of Tank Commander Nishizumi as Hosoki, Commander
- 1941: Brothers and Sisters of the Toda Family as Shōjirō Toda
- 1941: Hana wa itsuwarazu as Jōtarō
- 1941: Genkide yukōyo
- 1941: Akatsuki no gasshō
- 1941: Record of a Woman Doctor as Teacher Kamiya
- 1942: There Was a Father as Yasutaro Kurokawa
- 1942: Kanchō imada shisezu
- 1942: Minami no kaze mizue no maki
- 1943: Aiki minami e tobu
- 1943: Hiwa Normanton jiken: Kamen no butō as Seiichiro Tsuneoka
- 1943: Wakaki sugata as Karasawa, army doctor
- 1943: Haha no kinembi
- 1944: Fuchinkan gekichin
- 1944: Yasen gungakutai as Sonoda shoi
- 1944: Army as Captain
- 1944: Nichijō no tatakai
- 1945: Kita no san-nin as Iwao Hara
- 1945: Izu no musumetachi as Miyauchi
- 1946: Kanojo no hatsugen
- 1948: Yuwaku as Ryukichi
- 1949: Shitto
- 1949: Musume jūhachi usotsuki jidai as Nisaku Maki
- 1949: Beni imada kiezu
- 1949: Wakare no tango
- 1950: Shikkō yūyo (also director)
- 1950: Kikyō as Kyokichi Moriya
- 1950: Hatsukoi mondo
- 1951: Onna no mizu-kagami as Manabe
- 1951: Jiyū gakkō
- 1951: Aa seishun
- 1951: Fusetsu niju-nen (also director)
- 1952: Rikon as Daisuke Sakuma
- 1952: The Flavor of Green Tea over Rice as Mokichi Satake
- 1952: Dōkoku (also director)
- 1952: Nami
- 1952: Jinsei gekijo: dai ichi bu/dai ni bu (also director)
- 1953: Hiroba no kodoku as Kōtarō Hraguchi (also director)
- 1955: Bomeiki
- 1955: Aogashima no kodomotachi – Onna kyōshi no kiroku as Mr. Shimada
- 1955: Uruwashiki haha as Tomitarō О̄ta
- 1956: Kuro-obi sangokushi as Masazumi Amaji
- 1956: Fountainhead
- 1956: Aijō no kessan as Narasaki (also director)
- 1956: Kon'yaku sanbagarasu
- 1956: Gunshin Yamamoto gensui to Rengō kantai as Admiral Isoroku Yamamoto
- 1957: Chijo as Ichiro Amano
- 1957: Yoru no kamome (also director)
- 1958: Akutoku (also director)
- 1958: Equinox Flower as Wataru Hirayama
- 1959: Anata to watashi no aikotoba: Sayōnara, konnichiwa as Gosuke Aota
- 1959: Haru o matsu hitobito
- 1959: Fubuki To Tomoni Kieyukinu as Mamoru Kitagawa
- 1959: Hanran as Sahei Sanada
- 1959: Waga ai as Reisaku Niizu
- 1960: Late Autumn as Soichi Mamiya
- 1961: Uzu
- 1961: Hunting Rifle as Misugi
- 1973: Rise, Fair Sun as Inashiro
- 1974: Karei-naru Ichizoku as Daisuke Manpyo
- 1974: Castle of Sand as Ex-Finance Minister Tadokoro
- 1975: The Fossil as Tajihei Kazuki
- 1975: Tōkyō-wan enjō
- 1977: Yakuza senso: Nihon no Don as Kazumasa Sakura
- 1977: Hell's Gate Island (a.k.a. The Devil's Island) as Priest Ryōnen
- 1977: Nippon no Don: Yabohen as Kazumasa Sakura
- 1978: The Incident
- 1978: Kōtei no inai hachigatsu as Kozo Ohata
- 1978: Nihon no Don: Kanketsuhen as Kazumasa Sakura
- 1979: The Three Undelivered Letters as Mitsumasa Karasawa
- 1979: Nihon no Fixer
- 1979: Moeru aki
- 1980: Warui yatsura as Judge
- 1980: Deathquake
- 1981: Akuryo-to as Captain Daizen
- 1982: Kaseki no kouya as Haruyoshi Nakaomi (final film role)

=== Television ===
- 1963–1964: Akatsuki (NHK Asadora)
- 1979–1980: Ashura no Gotoku as Kōtarō Takezawa
