= Late Autumn (1960 film) =

1960 film by Yasujirō Ozu

- Theatrical release poster
- Directed by: Yasujirō Ozu
- Screenplay by: Kōgo Noda; Yasujirō Ozu
- Based on: Late Autumn; 1960 novel by Ton Satomi
- Produced by: Shizuo Yamanouchi
- Starring: Setsuko Hara; Yoko Tsukasa; Mariko Okada; Keiji Sada
- Cinematography: Yuharu Atsuta
- Edited by: Yoshiyasu Hamamura
- Music by: Takanobu Saitō
- Production company: Shochiku
- Distributed by: Shochiku Kinema Kenkyû-jo; New Yorker Films (United States)
- Release date: 13 November 1960 (Japan)
- Running time: 128 minutes
- Country: Japan
- Language: Japanese

Late Autumn (Japanese: 秋日和, Hepburn: Akibiyori; lit. 'A Calm Autumn Day') is a 1960 Japanese drama film directed by Yasujirō Ozu. It stars Setsuko Hara and Yoko Tsukasa as a mother and daughter, and is based on a story by Ton Satomi.

Late Autumn follows the attempts of three older men to help the widow of a late friend to marry off her daughter. The daughter is less than happy at the proposals, mainly because of her reluctance to leave her mother alone. The film was selected as the Japanese entry for the Best Foreign Language Film at the 33rd Academy Awards, but was not accepted as a nominee. While not one of the works for which Ozu is most known, Late Autumn is highly regarded by critics.

== Plot ==
Three middle-aged friends and former college mates – Mamiya (Shin Saburi), Taguchi (Nobuo Nakamura) and Hirayama (Ryūji Kita) – meet up for a memorial service on the seventh anniversary of the death of a late college friend, Miwa. Miwa's widow Akiko (Setsuko Hara) and 24-year-old daughter Ayako (Yoko Tsukasa) are also present. The three friends remark amongst themselves how attractive Akiko has remained even into her forties.

The party chats about their shared opinion that it is time for Ayako to get married. Taguchi tells them he has a prospective suitor for Ayako, but it later turns out the man already has a fiancée. Mamiya instead offers his employee, Goto (Keiji Sada), as another match, but Ayako confides privately in Akiko that she has no wish of getting married. Ayako, who lives alone with Akiko, is close to her mother, who teaches dressmaking.

Ayako meets Goto one day at Mamiya's office. During a hiking trip, a colleague offers to introduce him to Ayako again. Ayako and Goto begin dating, but Ayako is unwilling to marry as that will mean Akiko will live all alone. Ayako puts forward to Mamiya her theory that "romance and marriage could be separate". The three friends think that all this is an excuse and begin to speculate that Ayako will marry if Akiko remarries. The other two offer Hirayama, a widower, as Akiko's prospective remarriage partner. Hirayama warns them not to go ahead with their plan, but after discussing it with his son, changes his mind.

Hirayama now approaches Taguchi and Mamiya for help. Before they can broach the subject to Akiko, however, Mamiya tactlessly lets Ayako know about their plan. Thinking that her mother has known about this, an unhappy Ayako goes home to question her and then leaves for her colleague and friend Yuriko's (Mariko Okada) place in a huff. Yuriko, however, approves of Akiko's remarriage. She tells Ayako not to be selfish, which gains Ayako's displeasure.

Displeased, Yuriko confronts the three friends, and finds out the truth from them. Mamiya apologizes for their mishap; however, seeing their cause, Yuriko decides to help Hirayama. When Akiko and Ayako go for their last trip together, Akiko tells her daughter she has decided not to marry. She urges Ayako not to worry about her. With her assurance, Ayako marries Goto, leaving her mother to live alone.

== Cast ==
Actor	Role
Setsuko Hara	Akiko Miwa
Yoko Tsukasa	Ayako Miwa
Mariko Okada	Yuriko Sasaki
Keiji Sada	Shotaru Goto
Miyuki Kuwano	Michiko
Shin'ichirō Mikami	Koichi
Shin Saburi	Soichi Mamiya
Chishū Ryū	Shukichi Miwa
Nobuo Nakamura	Shuzo Taguchi
Kuniko Miyake	Nobuko
Sadako Sawamura	Fumiko
Ryūji Kita	Seiichiro Hirayama
Fumio Watanabe	Tsuneo Sugiyama
Ayako Senno	Shigeko Takamatsu
Yuriko Tashiro	Yoko
Tsûsai Sugawara	Sushi customer

== Release ==
=== Reception ===
Late Autumn has a 100% approval rating on Rotten Tomatoes. In a 1973 review, Nora Sayre of The New York Times praised the performances of Hara and Tsukasa and wrote, "Love is hardly mentioned when the subject of marriage arises. But enormous affection between parents and children, and among old friends, is revealed as it rarely is on screen: often, it's shown through the small jokes that intimates make at one another's expense."

In 2009 the film was ranked at No. 106 on the list of the "Greatest Japanese Films of All Time" by Japanese film magazine kinema Junpo. In 2010, critic Peter Bradshaw awarded the work five stars, writing that the work is "as tonally ambiguous and morally complex as anything he ever made." In Time Out, Trevor Johnston wrote that "the film offers as much pure aesthetic pleasure as, say, Wong Kar-Wai, but it’s ultimately on a human level that it’s most affecting...Hara's undemonstrative yet knowing half-smile in the final scene registers the inevitable paradox of loving and losing." Critic Derek Malcolm lauded it as "a commentary on Japanese mores that [surpasses] nationality and [manages] universal appeal." Leonard Maltin gave it three of four stars: "Solid Ozu drama reworking his Late Spring."

=== Home media ===
In 2007, The Criterion Collection released the film as part of the DVD box set Eclipse Series 3: Late Ozu.

In 2011, the British Film Institute released a Region 2 Dual Format Edition (Blu-ray + DVD). Included with this release is a standard definition presentation of Ozu's A Mother Should Be Loved (1934).

== See also ==
- List of submissions to the 33rd Academy Awards for Best Foreign Language Film
- List of Japanese submissions for the Academy Award for Best Foreign Language Film
