= The Flavor of Green Tea over Rice =

1952 Japanese film by Yasujirō Ozu

Ochazuke no Aji The Flavor of Green Tea over Rice
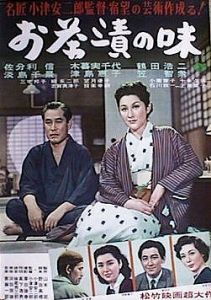
- Theatrical release poster
- Directed by: Yasujirō Ozu
- Written by: Kōgo Noda, Yasujirō Ozu
- Starring: Shin Saburi; Michiyo Kogure; Kōji Tsuruta; Chikage Awashima
- Cinematography: Yuuharu Atsuta
- Edited by: Yoshiyasu Hamamura
- Music by: Ichirō Saitō
- Distributed by: Shochiku
- Release date: 1 October 1952 (Japan)
- Running time: 115 minutes
- Country: Japan
- Language: Japanese

Tea Over Rice or The Flavor of Green Tea over Rice (Japanese: お茶漬の味, Hepburn: Ochazuke no Aji) is a 1952 Japanese film directed by Yasujirō Ozu. The screenplay concerns a wealthy middle-aged couple (played by Shin Saburi and Michiyo Kogure) who have marital difficulties, and their niece who uses the couple's troubles as her excuse for not attending arranged marriage interviews.

== Plot ==
Taeko and Mokichi Satake are a childless married couple living in Tokyo. The husband, whom the wife thinks dull, is an executive at an engineering company.

Taeko's friend Aya persuades Taeko to falsely claim to her husband that Taeko's brother's daughter, Setsuko, is ill, so that she can go to a spa with a couple of friends. The plan goes wrong when Setsuko visits her house unexpectedly, but Taeko substitutes the invalid with another friend, Takako, and obtains consent from her husband to go for a break. At the spa, the four women drink sake and look at the koi in the pond, comparing a slow moving black one to Taeko's husband.

A few days later, Taeko, Aya, and Takako attend a baseball game. They see Aya's husband in the company of another woman, possibly from a bar that he goes to. A public announcement at the game requests that Taeko go home immediately. She does, where Setsuko, who called in the announcement, tells her that her parents want to set up an arranged marriage for her.

After dinner together, Mokichi and Noboru play Pachinko, and Mokichi meets up with an army buddy who now runs the parlor.

Taeko visits her family in Oiso, where they talk about Setsuko and the arranged marriage. Setsuko's family tasks Taeko to act as matchmaker for Setsuko at a kabuki theater; Setsuko runs off midway through the performance. She goes to see her uncle Mokichi, who is planning with Noboru to go to the bicycle races. Setsuko thinks that arranged marriages are old fashioned. Seeing that Mokichi and Taeko are not happy after their arranged marriage, she is determined to find her own spouse. Mokichi brings her back to the theater and leaves with Noboru for the bicycle races. Setsuko once again escapes from the arranged marriage meeting at the kabuki theater and meets with Mokichi and Noboru at the bicycle races. In the evening, the three of them are playing pachinko at a parlor. Mokichi leaves early to go home. Noboru and Setsuko go to a ramen noodle house where they eat and talk about arranged marriages.

Later, Setsuko goes to her uncle's house, where Taeko is fuming. Taeko demands that Mokichi scold Setsuko for not showing up for the arranged marriage meeting, which he does as long as his wife is in earshot. Taeko confronts Mokichi about being with Setsuko without informing her. The two have an argument, and Taeko becomes so angry that she refuses to speak to her husband for days.

Trying to make up, Mokichi tells Taeko that he finds his old habits hard to break because smoking inferior cigarettes and traveling third-class on a train remind him of the simpler pleasures of life. Taeko, who likes travelling in the first class train cars, leaves in a huff, before Mokichi has a chance to tell her about something. She goes on a train journey by herself away from Tokyo without informing Mokichi.

Mokichi's news is that his company is sending him to Uruguay on a business trip. In his taciturn way, he telegrams her, asking her to return right away without saying why. Everyone goes to the airport to see Mokichi leave. Taeko was not at the airport and returns home only after Mokichi's airplane has flown off. Two hours into the flight, Mokichi's airplane experiences mechanical troubles and returns to Tokyo; Mokichi's unexpected return home surprises his wife. Mokichi says that he is hungry and Taeko suggests a meal. Not wishing to wake up their servant Fumi, the couple make their way to the unfamiliar to them kitchen where they prepare ochazuke, rice with green tea. In the process of doing that together, they make up. Taeko tells her husband she now understands what he has been speaking earlier about simpler pleasures. She apologizes profusely and promises never to leave without a word again. Mokichi accepts, telling her to say no more. Taeko recounts to her circle that her husband said this was his happiest day since he married her.

The film ends with Setsuko confiding with Noboru over her aunt's changed attitude. The final scene shows them walking away, arguing in a somewhat playful manner, suggesting that the two have become a couple.

== Cast ==
- Shin Saburi as Mokichi Satake
- Michiyo Kogure as Taeko Satake
- Kōji Tsuruta as Non-chan / Noboru Okada
- Chishū Ryū as Sadao Hirayama
- Chikage Awashima as Aya Amamiya
- Keiko Tsushima as Setsuko Yamauchi
- Kuniko Miyake as Chizu Yamauchi
- Eijirō Yanagi as Naosuke Yamauchi
- Yōko Kosono as the Satake's maid Fumi
- Yūko Mochizuki as Sadao's wife Shige
- Mie Kitahara as Waitress
- Koji Shitara

== Production ==
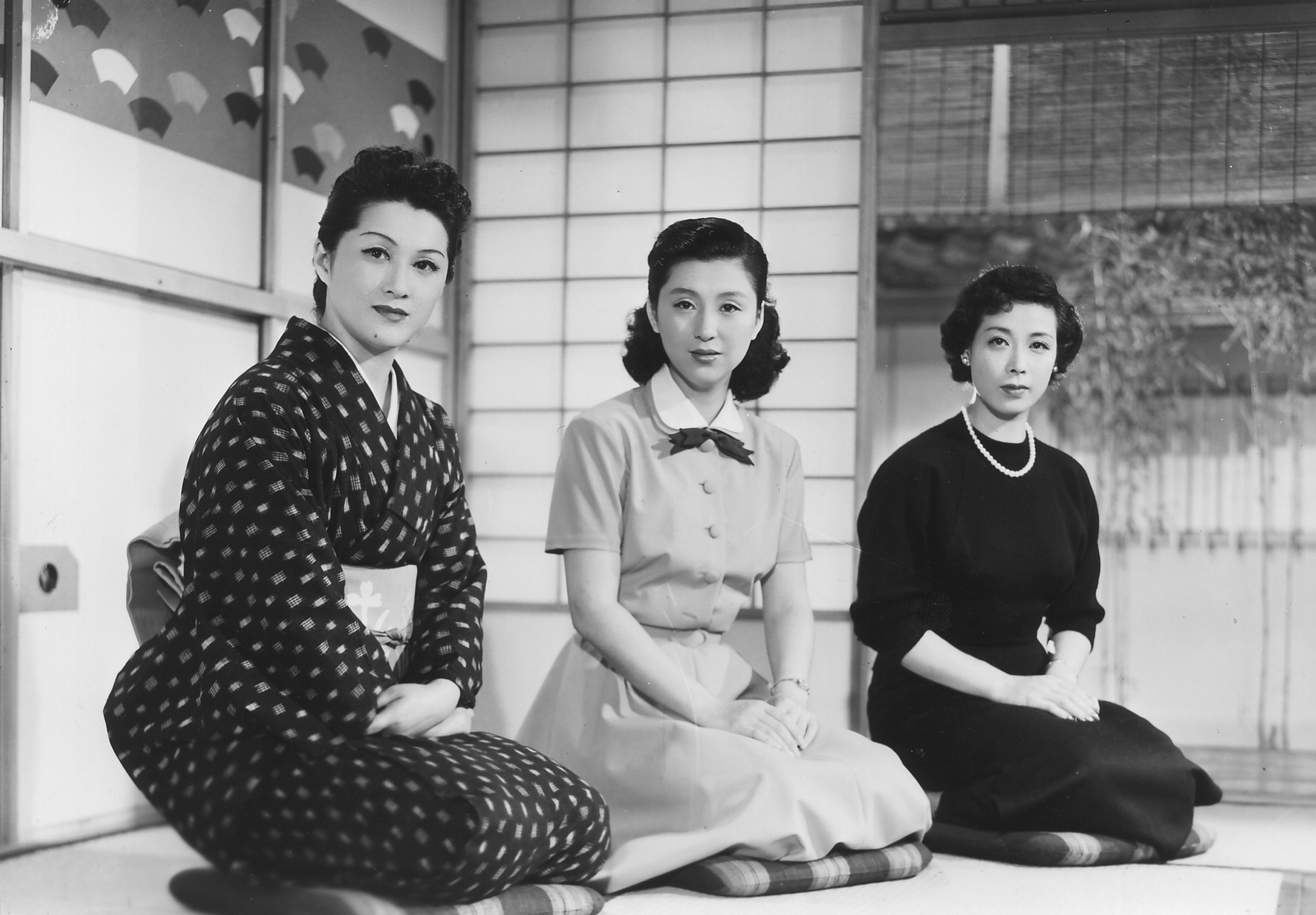
Michiyo Kogure, Keiko Tsushima and Chikage Awashima in a scene from the film

=== Writing ===
The script for the film was originally written by Yasujirō Ozu under the title "Kareshi Nankin e Iku" (彼氏南京へ行く, translation "Boyfriend is going to Nanjing") in 1939, with a story concerning a man about to be sent abroad on military service, rather than the business trip to Uruguay in the eventual film. In 1940 it was retitled "O-chazuke no aji" and went into preparation for production. However, the military censors demanded that the script be completely rewritten, for example demanding that the humble "ochazuke" dish mentioned in the title be changed to the celebratory dish of red beans and rice, because the man was leaving to serve in the army. Ozu then shelved the project.

== Reception ==
In 1973, Vincent Canby wrote that The Flavor of Green Tea over Rice "is not great Ozu. There are times—especially in its subplot about a girl who refuses traditional wedding arrangements—when it is almost formula comedy". Canby also said, however, that Kogure and Saburi's characters "become such appealing characters, touched by a kind of nobility", and noted that "Ozu never wastes our interest on connecting scenes if we can take them for granted. When he does show us a man proceeding, say from one office to another, it becomes important, perhaps as an acknowledgment of time lost or as a sort of film equivalent to the white space between the chapters in a novel."

Dave Kehr of the Chicago Reader marked the film as "Recommended". Praising Ozu's melodramas for "avoid[ing] any sense of cliché in their restrained, sometimes painfully subtle study of family relationships", Kehr argued that Ozu's "lack of camera movement sometimes speaks more than the elaborate techniques of his contemporaries."

- Mainichi Film Award for Best Actor : Shin Saburi.

== Home media ==
A digitally restored version of the film was released on DVD and Blu-ray by the Criterion Collection. The extras include the film What Did the Lady Forget?, a 1939 feature also directed by Yasujirō Ozu. The home video release also features a video essay by film scholar David Bordwell and Ozu & Noda, a documentary on Ozu's lifetime. The booklet included in the Criterion Collection release features an essay by scholar Junji Yoshida. The release also features a cover designed by Katherine Lam.
