= Late Spring =

1949 film by Yasujirō Ozu

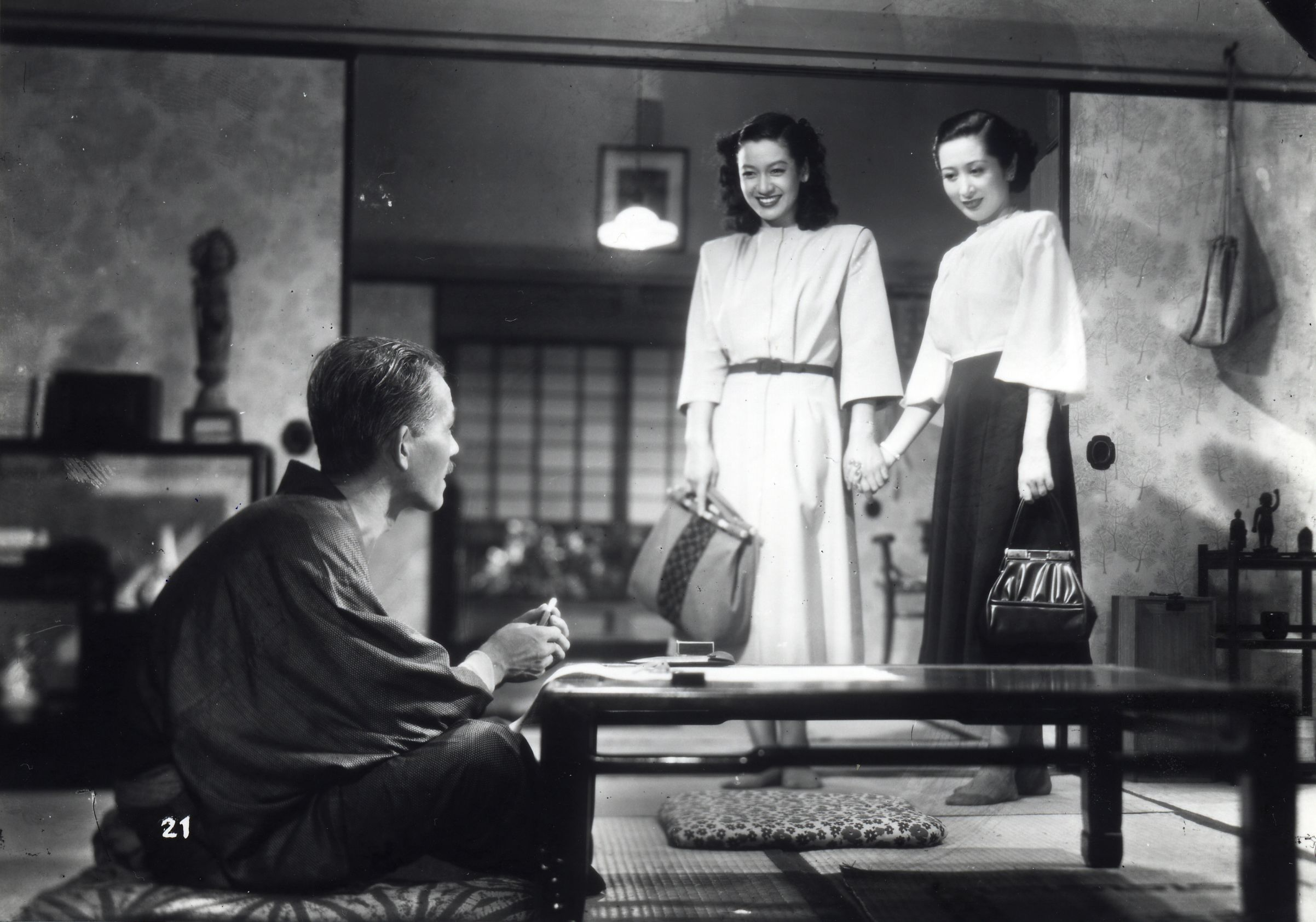
- Chishū Ryū, Setsuko Hara and Yumeji Tsukioka

Japanese name
- Kanji: 晩春
Transcriptions
- Revised Hepburn: Banshun
- Directed by: Yasujirō Ozu
- Screenplay by: Kogo Noda; Yasujirō Ozu
- Based on: Father and Daughter (1939 novel) by Kazuo Hirotsu
- Produced by: Takeshi Yamamoto
- Starring: Setsuko Hara; Yumeji Tsukioka; Kuniko Miyake; Haruko Sugimura; Yōko Katsuragi; Jun Usami; Masao Mishima; Chishū Ryū
- Cinematography: Yūharu Atsuta
- Edited by: Yoshiyasu Hamamura
- Music by: Senji Itō
- Production company: Shochiku
- Distributed by: Shochiku
- Release date: September 19, 1949 (Japan)
- Running time: 108 minutes
- Country: Japan
- Language: Japanese

Late Spring (晩春, Banshun) is a 1949 Japanese drama film directed by Yasujirō Ozu and written by Ozu and Kogo Noda, based on the short novel Father and Daughter (Chichi to musume) by the 20th-century novelist and critic Kazuo Hirotsu. The film was written and shot during the Allied Powers' Occupation of Japan and was subject to the Occupation's official censorship requirements. Starring Chishū Ryū, who was featured in almost all of the director's films, and Setsuko Hara, marking her first of six appearances in Ozu's work, it is the first installment of Ozu's so-called "Noriko trilogy", succeeded by Early Summer (Bakushu, 1951) and Tokyo Story (Tokyo Monogatari, 1953); in each of which Hara portrays a young woman named Noriko, though the three Norikos are distinct, unrelated characters, linked primarily by their status as single women in postwar Japan. (Note: The surnames of the three Norikos in Late Spring, Early Summer and Tokyo Story are, respectively, Somiya, Mamiya and Hirayama. See Bordwell (1988), pp. 307, 316, 328.)

Late Spring belongs to the type of Japanese cinema known as shōshimin-eiga, a genre that deals with the ordinary daily lives of working class and middle class people of modern times. The film is frequently regarded as the first in the director's final creative period, "the major prototype of the [director's] 1950s and 1960s work". These films are characterized by, among other traits, an exclusive focus on stories about families during Japan's immediate postwar era, a tendency towards very simple plots and the use of a generally static camera.

Late Spring was released on September 19, 1949, to critical acclaim in the Japanese press. In the following year, it was awarded the prestigious Kinema Junpo critics' award as the best Japanese production released in 1949. In 1972, the film was commercially released in the United States, again to very positive reviews. Late Spring has been referred to as the director's "most perfect" work, as "the definitive film of Ozu's master filmmaking approach and language" and has been called "one of the most perfect, most complete, and most successful studies of character ever achieved in Japanese cinema". The film has been considered one of the greatest films of all time.

== Plot ==
The film opens at a tea ceremony. Professor Shukichi Somiya, a widower, has only one child, a twenty-seven-year-old unmarried daughter, Noriko, who takes care of the household and the everyday needs—cooking, cleaning, mending, etc.—of her father. On a shopping trip to Tokyo, Noriko encounters one of her father's friends, Professor Jo Onodera, who lives in Kyoto. Noriko knows that Onodera, who had been a widower like her father, has recently remarried, and she tells him that she finds the very idea of his remarriage distasteful, even "filthy." Onodera, and later her father, tease her for having such thoughts.

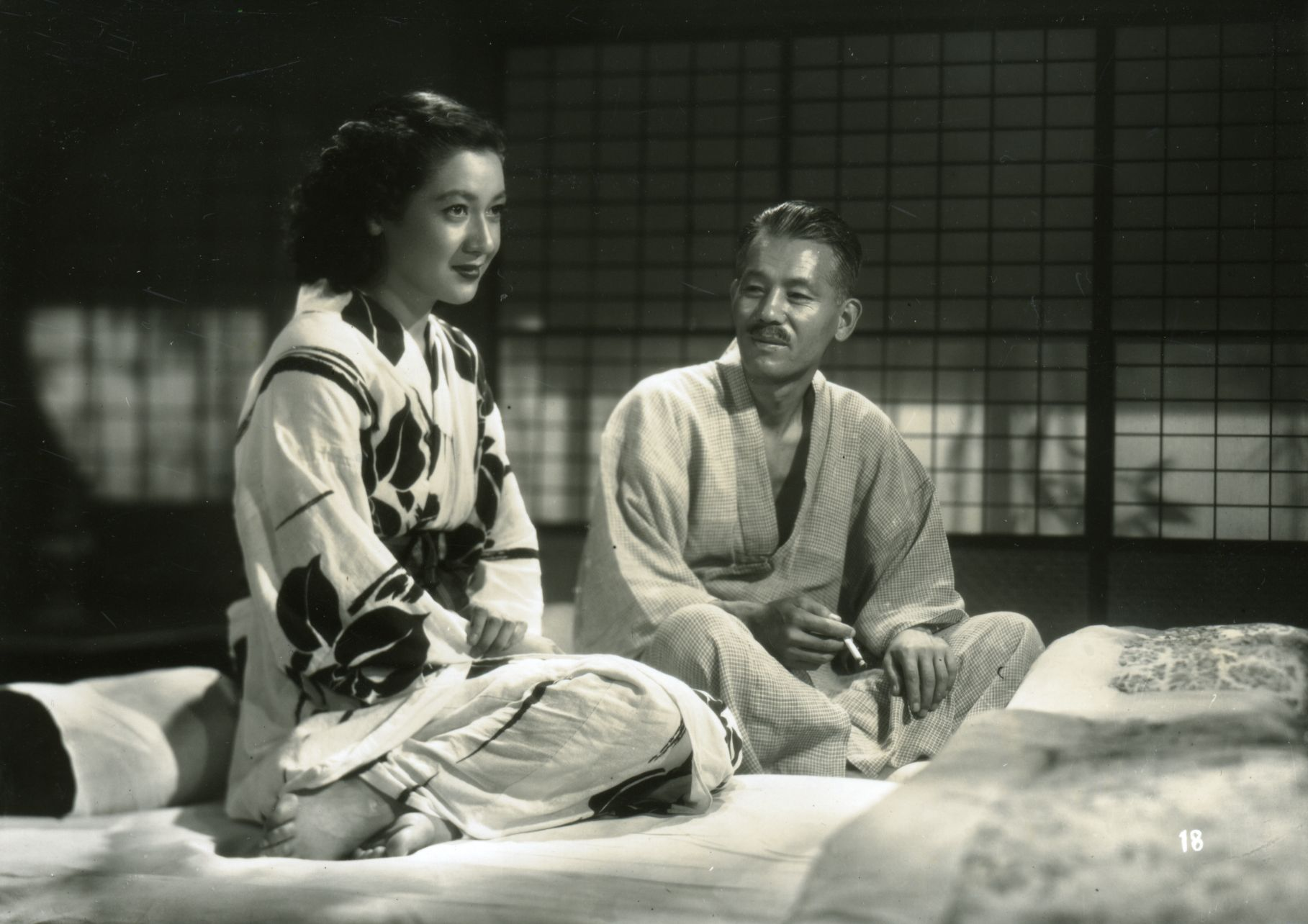
Production still of Setsuko Hara as Noriko and Chishū Ryū as Shukichi.

Shukichi's sister, Aunt Masa, convinces him that it is high time his daughter got married. Noriko is friendly with her father's assistant, Hattori, and Aunt Masa suggests that her brother ask Noriko if she might be interested in Hattori. When he does bring up the subject, however, Noriko laughs: Hattori has been engaged to another young woman for quite some time.

Undaunted, Masa pressures Noriko to meet with a marriageable young man, a Tokyo University graduate named Satake who, Masa believes, bears a strong resemblance to Gary Cooper, a favorite of Noriko. Noriko declines, explaining that she does not wish to marry anyone, because to do so would leave her father alone and helpless. Masa surprises Noriko by claiming that she is also trying to arrange a match between Shukichi and Mrs. Miwa, an attractive young widow known to Noriko. If Masa succeeds, Noriko would have no excuse.

At a Noh performance attended by Noriko and her father, the latter smilingly greets Mrs. Miwa, which triggers Noriko's jealousy. When her father later tries to talk her into going to meet Satake, he tells her that he intends to marry Mrs. Miwa. Devastated, Noriko reluctantly agrees to meet the young man and, to her surprise, has a very favorable impression of him. Under pressure from all sides, Noriko consents to the arranged marriage.

The Somiyas go on one last trip together before the wedding, visiting Kyoto. There they meet Professor Onodera and his family. Noriko changes her opinion of Onodera's remarriage when she discovers that his new wife is a nice person. While packing their luggage for the trip home, Noriko asks her father why they cannot simply stay as they are now, even if he does remarry – she cannot imagine herself any happier than living with and taking care of him. Shukichi admonishes her, saying that she must embrace the new life she will build with Satake, one in which he, Shukichi, will have no part, because "that's the order of human life and history." Noriko asks her father's forgiveness for her "selfishness" and agrees to go ahead with the marriage.

Noriko's wedding day arrives. At home just before the ceremony, both Shukichi and Masa admire Noriko, who is dressed in a traditional wedding costume. Noriko thanks her father for the care he has taken of her throughout her life and leaves in a hired car for the wedding. Afterwards, Aya, a divorced friend of Noriko's, goes with Shukichi to a favored eatery. Over celebratory sake, he confesses that his claim that he was going to marry Mrs. Miwa was a ruse to persuade Noriko to get married herself. Aya, touched by his sacrifice, promises to visit him often. Shukichi returns home alone to an empty house. He sits down in a chair and starts to peel an apple with a small knife. The apple peel grows into a long continuous ribbon before it finally drops loose onto the floor. Shukichi slowly lowers his head in silence.

== Cast ==
| Actor | Character name (English) | Character name (Japanese) | Rōmaji (Japanese order) |
|---|---|---|---|
| Chishū Ryū | Shūkichi Somiya | 曾宮 周吉 | Somiya Shūkichi |
| Setsuko Hara | Noriko Somiya | 曾宮 紀子 | Somiya Noriko |
| Yumeji Tsukioka | Aya Kitagawa | 北川 アヤ | Kitagawa Aya |
| Haruko Sugimura | Masa Taguchi | 田口 マサ | Taguchi Masa |
| Hohi Aoki | Katsuyoshi Taguchi | 田口 勝義 | Taguchi Katsuyoshi |
| Jun Usami | Shuichi Hattori | 服部 昌一 | Hattori Shūichi |
| Kuniko Miyake | Akiko Miwa | 三輪 秋子 | Miwa Akiko |
| Masao Mishima | Jo Onodera | 小野寺 譲 | Onodera Jō |
| Yoshiko Tsubouchi | Kiku Onodera | 小野寺 きく | Onodera Kiku |
| Yōko Katsuragi | Misako | | |
| Toyoko Takahashi | Shige | | |
| Jun Tanizaki | Seizo Hayashi | | |
| Yōko Benisawa | a teahouse proprietress | | |

== Production ==
=== The Occupation censorship ===
==== Censorship problems with Late Spring ====
The central event of Late Spring is the marriage of the heroine to a man she has met only once through a single arranged meeting. This immediately presented a problem for the censors of the American Occupation. According to film scholar Kyoko Hirano, these officials "considered feudalistic the Japanese custom of arranged meetings for prospective marriage partners, miai, because the custom seemed to them to downgrade the importance of the individual." Hirano notes that, had this policy against showing arranged marriages onscreen been rigidly enforced, Late Spring could never have been made. In the original synopsis (which the filmmakers were required to submit to the censorship before production could be approved), Noriko's decision to marry was presented as a collective family decision, not an individual choice, and the censors apparently rejected this.

The synopsis explained that the trip to Kyoto by father and daughter, just prior to Noriko's marriage, occurs so she can visit her dead mother's grave. This motivation is absent from the finished film, possibly because the censors would have interpreted such a visit as "ancestor worship," a practice they frowned upon.

Any reference in the script to the devastation caused by the American bombings was removed. In the script, Shukichi remarks to Onodera's wife in Kyoto that her city is a very nice place, unlike Tokyo, with all its ruins. The censors deleted the reference to ruins (as an implied critique of the Allies) and, in the finished film, the word "hokorippoi" ("dusty") was substituted as a description of Tokyo.

The censors at first automatically deleted a reference in the script to the Hollywood star Gary Cooper, but then reinstated it when they realized that the comparison was to Noriko's (unseen) suitor Satake, who is described by the female characters as attractive, and was thus flattering to the American actor.

Sometimes, the censors' demands seemed irrational. A line about Noriko's health having been negatively affected by "her work after being conscripted by the [Japanese] Navy during the war" was changed to "the forced work during the war," as if even the very mention of the Japanese Navy was somehow suspect.

At the script phase of the censorship process, the censors demanded that the character of Aunt Masa, who at one point finds a lost change purse on the ground and keeps it as a kind of totem of good fortune for the wedding succeeding, should be shown handing over the purse to the police. Ozu responded by turning the situation, in the finished film, into a kind of running gag in which Shukichi repeatedly (and futilely) urges his sister to turn the purse in to the police. This change has been called "a mocking kind of partial compliance with the censorship."

==== Ozu's alleged "subversion" of censorship ====
One scholar, Lars-Martin Sorensen, has claimed that Ozu's partial aim in making the film was to present an ideal of Japan at odds with that which the Occupation wanted to promote, and that he successfully subverted the censorship in order to accomplish this. "The controversial and subversive politico-historical 'message' of the film is... that the beauty of tradition, and of subjugation of individual whims to tradition and history, by far outshines the imported and imposed western trends of occupied Japan."

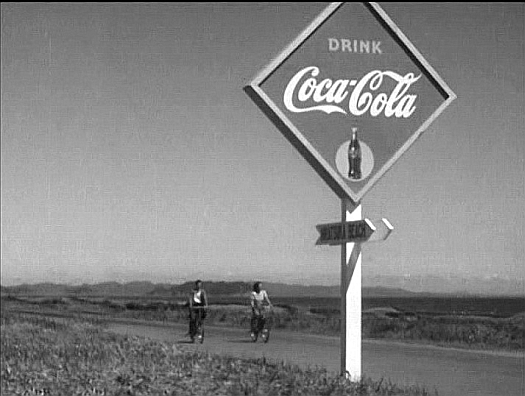
Hattori (Jun Usami) and Noriko bicycling towards the beach (with the Coca-Cola sign in the foreground)

Sorensen uses as an example the scene early in the film in which Noriko and her father's assistant Hattori are bicycling towards the beach. They pass a diamond-shaped Coca-Cola sign and another sign, in English, warning that the weight capacity of a bridge over which they are riding is 30 tons: quite irrelevant information for this young couple, but perfectly appropriate for American military vehicles that might pass along that road. (Neither the Coke sign nor the road warning are referred to in the script approved by the censors.) Sorensen argues that these objects are "obvious reference(s) to the presence of the occupying army."

On the other hand, Late Spring, more than any other film Ozu made, is suffused with the symbols of Japanese tradition: the tea ceremony that opens the film, the temples at Kamakura, the Noh performance that Noriko and Shukichi attend, and the landscape and Zen gardens of Kyoto. Sorensen argues that these images of historical landmarks "were intended to inspire awe and respect for the treasures of ancient Japan in contrast to the impurity of the present." Sorensen also claims that, to Ozu's audience, "the exaltation of Japanese tradition and cultural and religious heritage must have brought remembrances of the good old days when Japan was still winning her battles abroad and nationalism reached its peak." To scholars such as Bordwell who assert that Ozu was promoting with this film an ideology that could be called liberal, Sorensen argues that contemporary reviews of the film "show that Ozu (the director and his personal convictions) was considered inseparable from his films, and that he was considered a conservative purist."

Sorensen concludes that such censorship may not necessarily be a bad thing. "One of the positive side effects of being prohibited from airing one's views openly and directly is that it forces artists to be creative and subtle in their ways of expression."

=== Ozu's collaborators ===
On Late Spring, Ozu worked with a number of old colleagues from his prewar days, such as actor Chishu Ryu and cinematographer Yuharu Atsuta. However, a long-deferred reunion with one artist and the beginning of a long collaboration with another—the screenwriter Kogo Noda and the actress Setsuko Hara, respectively—were to prove critical artistically, both to this work and to the direction of Ozu's subsequent career.

==== Kogo Noda ====
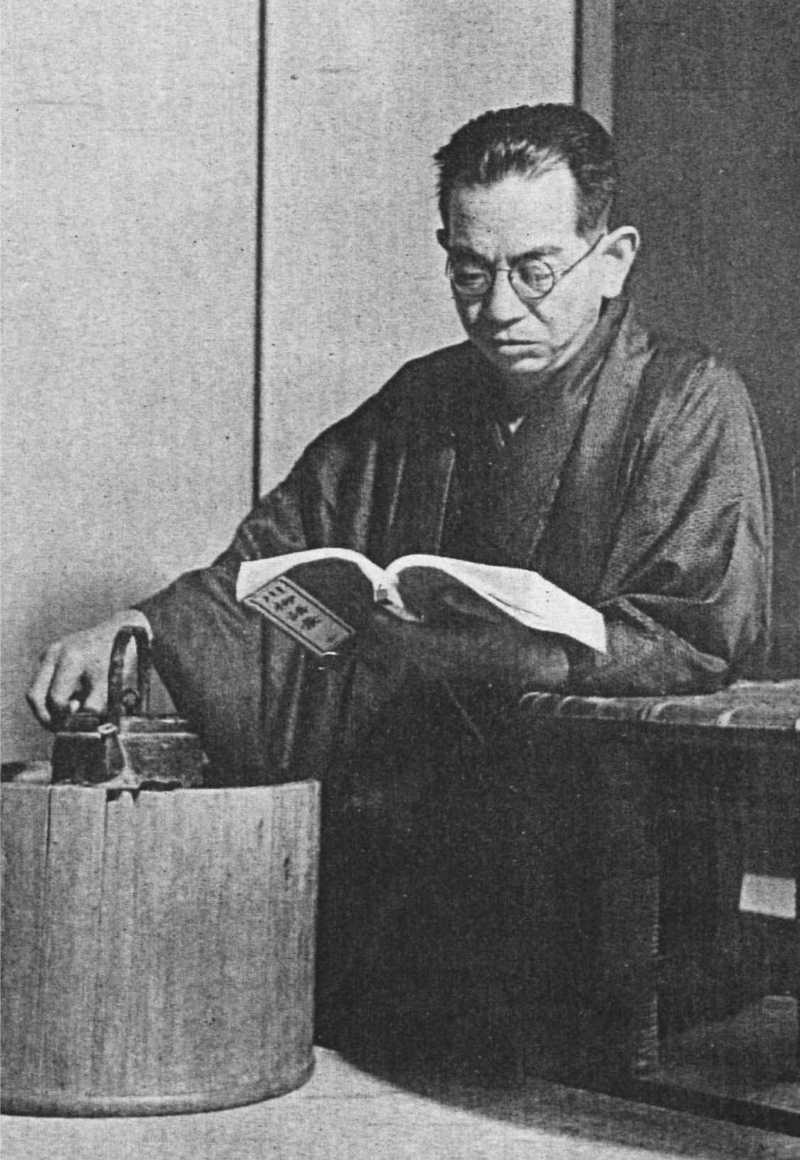
Ozu's frequent screenwriting partner Kōgo Noda: from Late Spring on, Noda would collaborate on all Ozu's films until the latter's death in 1963

Kogo Noda, already an accomplished screenwriter, had collaborated with Ozu on the script of his debut film of 1927, Sword of Penitence. Noda had later written scripts with Ozu (while also collaborating with other directors) on many of his best silent pictures, including Tokyo Chorus. Yet by 1949, the director had not worked with his old friend for fourteen years. However, their reunion on Late Spring was so harmonious and successful that Ozu wrote exclusively with Noda for the rest of his career.

Ozu once said of Noda: "When a director works with a scriptwriter they must have some characteristics and habits in common; otherwise, they won't get along. My daily life—what time I get up, how much sake I drink and so on—is in almost complete agreement with that of [Noda]. When I work with Noda, we collaborate even on short bits of dialogue. Although we never discuss the details of the sets or costumes, his mental image of these things is always in accord with mine; our ideas never criss cross or go awry. We even agree on whether a dialogue should end with wa or yo." From Late Spring on, partly due to Noda's influence, all Ozu's characters would be comfortably middle class and thus, unlike the characters in, for example, Record of a Tenement Gentleman or A Hen in the Wind, beyond immediate physical want and necessity.

==== Setsuko Hara ====
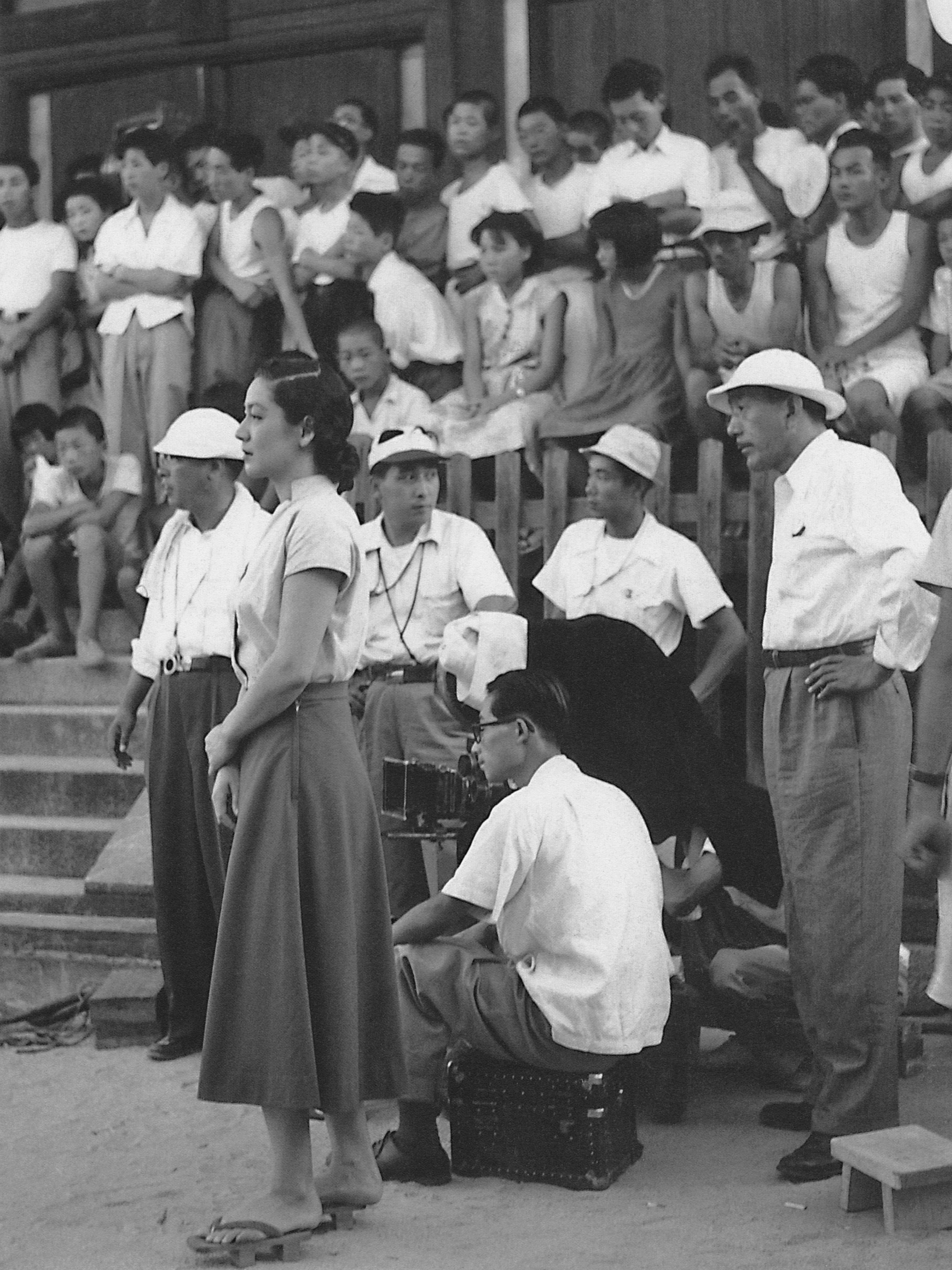
Yasujirō Ozu directing Setsuko Hara in the final film of the "Noriko Trilogy," Tokyo Story (1953); Ozu is standing in the foreground of the picture, at far right

Setsuko Hara (born Masae Aida in Yokohama, Kanagawa prefecture, on June 17, 1920) had appeared in films since the mid-1930s, when she was in her teens. Her tall frame and strong facial features—including very large eyes and a prominent nose—were unusual among Japanese actresses at the time; it has been rumored, but not verified, that she had a German grandparent. She maintained her popularity throughout the war years, when she appeared in many films made for propaganda purposes by the military government, becoming "the perfect war-movie heroine." After the defeat of Japan, she was more popular than ever, so that by the time Ozu worked with her for the first time on Late Spring, she had already become "one of Japan's best-loved actresses."

Ozu had a very high regard for Hara's work. He said: "Every Japanese actor can play the role of a soldier and every Japanese actress can play the role of a prostitute to some extent. However, it is rare to find an actress [like Hara] who can play the role of a daughter from a good family." Speaking of her performance in Early Summer, he was quoted as saying: "Setsuko Hara is a really good actress. I wish I had four or five more like her."

In addition to the three "Noriko" films, Ozu directed her in three other roles: as an unhappily married wife in Tokyo Twilight (Tokyo Boshoku, 1957), as the mother of a marriageable daughter in Late Autumn (Akibiyori, 1960) and the daughter-in-law of a sake plant owner in the director's penultimate film, The End of Summer (Kohayagawa-ke no Aki, 1961). Bordwell summed up the critical consensus of Hara's significance to the late work of Ozu when he wrote: "After 1948, Setsuko Hara becomes the archetypal Ozu woman, either the bride-to-be or the widow of middle years."

== Narrative, themes and characterization ==
=== Narrative strategies ===
The films of Yasujirō Ozu are well known for their unusual approach to film narrative. Scenes that most filmmakers would consider obligatory (e.g., the wedding of Noriko) are often not shown at all, while apparently extraneous incidents are given seemingly inordinate prominence. Sometimes important narrative information is withheld not only from a major character, but from the viewer, such as the news of Hattori's engagement, about which neither Noriko's father nor the audience has any knowledge until Noriko, laughing, informs him. And at times, the filmmaker proceeds, within a scene, to jump from one time frame to another without transition, as when two establishing shots of some travelers waiting for a train on a platform lead to a third shot of the same train already on its way to Tokyo.

==== "Parametric" narrative theory ====
Bordwell refers to Ozu's approach to narrative as "parametric narration." By this term, Bordwell means that Ozu's "overunified" visual approach, characterized by its "stylistic rigor," often provides the basis for "playful deviation," including narrative playfulness. As Bordwell puts it somewhat more plainly, Ozu "back[s] away from his own machinery in order to achieve humor and surprise." In his view, "in narrative poetry, rhythm and rhyme need not completely subordinate themselves to the demand of telling the story; in art song or opera, 'autonomous' musical structures may require that the story grind to a halt while particular harmonic or melodic patterns work themselves out. Similarly, in some films, temporal or spatial qualities can lure us with a patterning that is not wholly dependent on representing fabula [i.e., story] information."

Bordwell points out that the opening scene of Late Spring "begins at the railroad station, where the characters aren't. A later scene will do exactly the same thing, showing the train station before showing [the characters] already hurtling towards Tokyo... In Tokyo, [Professor] Onodera and Noriko discuss going to an art exhibit; cut to a sign for the exhibit, then to the steps of the art gallery; cut to the two in a bar, after they've gone to the exhibit."

==== "Essentialist" narrative theory ====
To Kathe Geist, Ozu's narrative methods reflect the artist's economy of means, not "playfulness." "His frequent use of repetition and [narrative] ellipsis do not 'impose their will' on Ozu's plots; they are his plots. By paying attention to what has been left out and to what is repeated, one arrives at Ozu's essential story."

As an example, Geist cites the scene in which Noriko and Hattori bicycle together to the beach and have a conversation there, an incident that appears to imply a budding romantic relationship between them. When Noriko slightly later reveals to her father that Hattori, before that bicycle trip, had already been engaged to another woman, "we wonder", writes Geist, "why Ozu has wasted so much time on the 'wrong man' [for Noriko]." However, the key to the beach scene's importance to the plot, according to Geist, is the dialogue between Hattori and Noriko, in which the latter tells him that she is "the jealous type." This seemingly unlikely claim, given her affable nature, is later confirmed when she becomes bitterly jealous at her father's apparent plan to remarry. Geist thus claims "Her jealousy goads her into her own marriage and is thus the pivot on which the plot turns."

Geist sums up her analysis of several major Ozu films of the postwar period by asserting that "the narratives unfold with an astounding precision in which no shot and certainly no scene is wasted and all is overlayered with an intricate web of interlocking meaning."

=== Major themes ===
The following represents what some critics regard as important themes in this film.

==== Marriage ====
The main theme of Late Spring is marriage: specifically, the persistent attempts by several characters in the film to get Noriko married. The marriage theme was a topical one for Japanese of the late 1940s. On January 1, 1948, a new law had been issued which allowed young people over twenty to marry consensually without parental permission for the first time. The Japanese Constitution of 1947 had made it much easier for a wife to divorce her husband; up until that time, it had been "difficult, almost impossible" to do so. Several commentators have pointed out that one reason why Noriko is still unmarried at the relatively late age of 27 is that many of the young men of her generation had been killed in the Second World War, leaving far fewer eligible potential partners for single young women.

Marriage in this film, as well as many of Ozu's late films, is strongly associated with death. Prof. Onodera's daughter, for example, refers to marriage as "life's graveyard." Geist writes: "Ozu connects marriage and death in obvious and subtle ways in most of his late films... The comparison between weddings and funerals is not merely a clever device on Ozu's part, but is so fundamental a concept in Japanese culture that these ceremonies as well as those surrounding births have built-in similarities... The elegiac melancholy Ozu evokes at the end of Late Spring, Late Autumn, and An Autumn Afternoon arises only partly because the parents have been left alone... The sadness arises because the marriage of the younger generation inevitably reflects on the mortality of the older generation." Robin Wood stresses the marriage-death connection in commenting on the scene that takes place in the Somiya home just before the wedding ceremony. "After everyone has left the room... [Ozu] ends the sequence with a shot of the empty mirror. Noriko is no longer even a reflection, she has disappeared from the narrative, she is no longer 'Noriko' but 'wife.' The effect is that of a death."

==== Tradition vs. modernity ====
The tension between tradition and modern pressures in relation to marriage—and, by extension, within Japanese culture as a whole—is one of the major conflicts Ozu portrays in the film. Sorensen indicates by several examples that what foods a character eats or even how he or she sits down (e.g., on tatami mats or Western-style chairs) reveals the relationship of that character to tradition. According to Peña, Noriko "is the quintessential moga—modan gaaru, 'modern girl'—that populates Japanese fiction, and really the Japanese imagination, beginning in the 1920s onward." Throughout most of the film, Noriko wears Western clothing rather than a kimono, and outwardly behaves in up-to-date ways. However, Bordwell asserts that "Noriko is more old-fashioned than her father, insisting that he could not get along without her and resenting the idea that a widower might remarry... she clings to an outmoded notion of propriety."

The other two important female characters in the film are also defined in terms of their relation to tradition. Noriko's Aunt Masa appears in scenes in which she is associated with traditional Japan, such as the tea ceremony in one of the ancient temples of Kamakura. Noriko's friend Aya, on the other hand, seems to reject tradition entirely. Aya had taken advantage of the new liberal divorce laws to end her recent marriage. Thus, she is presented as a new, Westernized phenomenon: the divorcee. She "takes English tea with milk from teacups with handles, [and] also bakes shortcake (shooto keeki)," a very un-Japanese type of food.

Like Noriko, her father has an ambiguous relation with modernity. Shukichi is first seen in the film checking the correct spelling of the name of the German-American economist Friedrich List—an important transitional figure during Japan's Meiji era. (List's theories helped stimulate the economic modernization of the country.) Prof. Somiya treats Aya, the divorcee, with unfailing courtesy and respect, implying a tolerant, "modern" attitude—though one critic suspects that a man of Shukichi's class and generation in the real-life Japan of that period might have been considerably less tolerant.

However, like Aunt Masa, Shukichi is also associated with the traditions of old Japan, such as the city of Kyoto with its ancient temples and Zen rock gardens, and the Noh play that he so clearly enjoys. Most importantly, he pressures Noriko to go through with the miai meeting with Satake, though he makes clear to her that she can reject her suitor without negative consequences.

Sorensen has summed up the ambiguous position of both father and daughter in relation to tradition as follows: "Noriko and [Professor] Somiya interpolate between the two extremes, between shortcake and Nara-pickles, between ritually prepared green tea and tea with milk, between love marriage/divorce and arranged marriage, between Tokyo and Nara. And this interpolation is what makes them complex characters, wonderfully human in all their internal inconsistencies, very Ozu-like and likable indeed."

==== The home ====
Late Spring has been seen by some commentators as a transitional work in terms of the home as a recurring theme in Japanese cinema. Tadao Sato points out that Shochiku's directors of the 1920s and 1930s—including Shimazu, Gosho, Mikio Naruse and Ozu himself—"presented the family in a tense confrontation with society." In A Brother and His Young Sister (Ani to sono imoto, 1939) by Shimazu, for example, "the home is sanctified as a place of warmth and generosity, feelings that were rapidly vanishing in society." By the early 1940s, however, in such films as Ozu's There Was a Father, "the family [was] completely subordinate to the [wartime] state" and "society is now above criticism." But when the military state collapsed as a result of Japan's defeat in the war, the idea of the home collapsed with it: "Neither the nation nor the household could dictate morality any more."

Sato considers Late Spring to be "the next major development in the home drama genre," because it "initiated a series of Ozu films with the theme: there is no society, only the home. While family members had their own places of activity—office, school, family business—there was no tension between the outside world and the home. As a consequence, the home itself lost its source of moral strength." Yet despite the fact that these home dramas by Ozu "tend to lack social relevance," they "came to occupy the mainstream of the genre and can be considered perfect expressions of 'my home-ism,' whereby one's family is cherished to the exclusion of everything else."

==== The season and sexuality ====
Late Spring is the first of several extant Ozu films with a "seasonal" title. (Note: A 1932 silent film, Spring Comes from the Ladies (Haru wa gofujin kara) is missing and considered lost. See Bordwell (1988), p. 223.) (Later films with seasonal titles are Early Summer, Early Spring (Soshun, 1956), Late Autumn and The End of Summer (literally, "Autumn for the Kohayagawa Family")). (Note: Although Ozu's final film, Sanma no aji (1962), was released as An Autumn Afternoon in English-language countries, the original Japanese release title of the film refers to fish rather than to any season, and has been variously translated as The Taste of Mackerel, The Taste of Mackerel Pike, or The Taste of Saury. See Richie (1974), p. 250.) The "late spring" of the title refers on the most obvious level to Noriko who, at 27, is in the "late spring" of her life, and approaching the age at which she would no longer be considered marriageable.

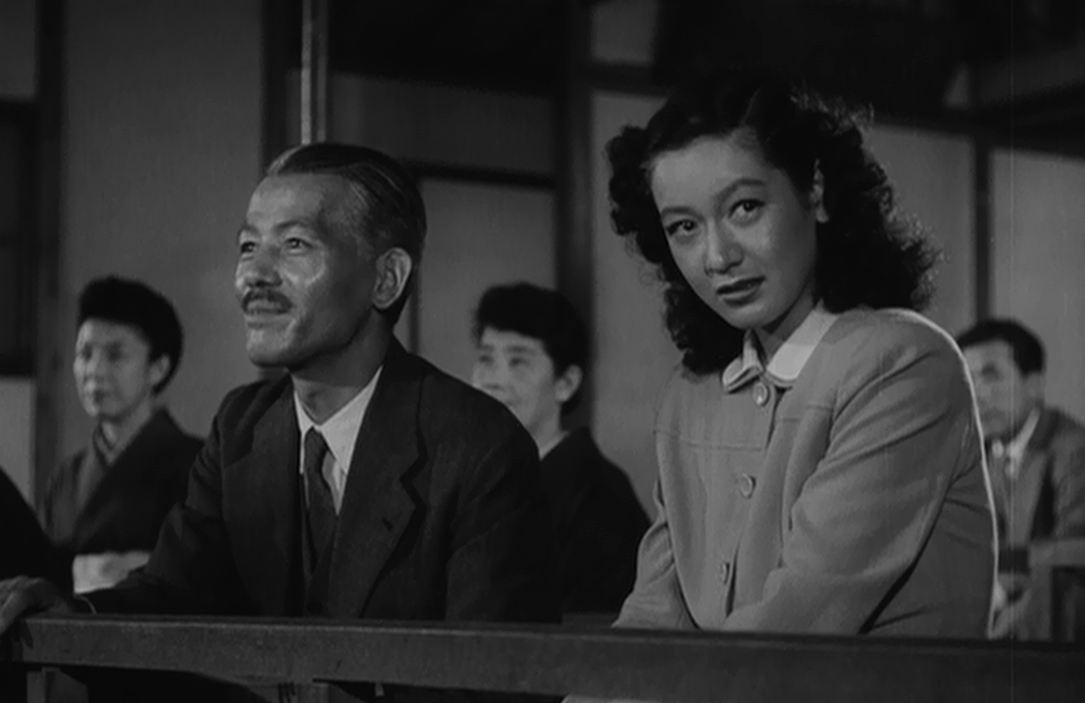
The Noh scene: Noriko is consumed with jealousy because her father has just silently greeted the attractive widow, Mrs. Miwa (Kuniko Miyake, not shown)

However, there may be another meaning to Ozu's title derived from ancient Japanese culture. When Noriko and Shukichi attend the Noh play, the work performed is called Kakitsubata or "The Water Iris." (The water iris in Japan is a plant which blooms, usually in marshland or other moist soil, in mid-to-late-spring.) In this play, a traveling monk arrives at a place called Yatsuhashi, famous for its water irises, when a woman appears. She alludes to a famous poem by the waka poet of the Heian period, Ariwara no Narihira, in which each of the five lines begins with one syllable that, spoken together, spell out the word for "water iris" ("ka-ki-tsu-ba-ta"). The monk stays the night at the humble hut of the woman, who then appears in an elaborate kimono and headdress and reveals herself to be the spirit of the water iris. She praises Narihira, dances and at dawn receives enlightenment from the Buddha and disappears. (Note: Although there has been some dispute over the identity of the Noh play shown in the film, a French translation of Ozu and Noda's original script explicitly identifies the play as Kakitsubata, "nom d'une fleur" ("the name of a flower"). See Ozu and Noda, La fin du printemps, translated by Takenori Noumi [no date], p. 23, downloadable at http://www.01.246.ne.jp/~tnoumi/noumi1/books/lafinduprin.pdf.)

As Norman Holland explains in an essay on the film, "the iris is associated with late spring, the movie's title", and the play contains a great deal of sexual and religious symbolism. The iris' leaves and flower are traditionally seen as representing the male and female genitalia, respectively. The play itself is traditionally seen, according to Holland, as "a tribute to the union of man and woman leading to enlightenment."

Noriko calmly accepts this sexual content when couched in the "archaic" form of Noh drama, but when she sees her father nod politely to the attractive widow, Mrs. Miwa, who is also in the audience, "that strikes Noriko as outrageous and outraging. Had this woman and her father arranged to meet at this play about sexuality? Is this remarriage 'filthy' like [Onodera's] remarriage? She feels both angry and despairing. She is so mad at her father that, quite uncharacteristically, she angrily walks away from him after they leave the theater." Holland thus sees one of the film's main themes as "the pushing of traditional and inhibited Noriko into marriage."

=== Major characters ===
Late Spring has been particularly praised for its focus on character, having been cited as "one of the most perfect, most complete, and most successful studies of character ever achieved in Japanese cinema." Ozu's complex approach to character can best be examined through the two protagonists of the film: Noriko Somiya and her father, Shukichi.

==== Noriko Somiya ====
Noriko, at 27, is an unmarried, unemployed young woman, completely dependent financially upon her father and living (at the film's beginning) quite contently with him. Her two most important traits, which are interrelated, are her unusually close and affectionate relationship with her father and her extreme reluctance to marry and leave home. Of the first trait, the relationship between father and daughter has been described as a "transgenerational friendship," in which there is nevertheless no hint of anything incestuous or even inappropriate. However, it has been conceded that this may primarily be due to cultural differences between Japan and the West and that, were the story remade in the West, such a possible interpretation couldn't be evaded. The second trait, her strong aversion to the idea of marriage, has been seen, by some commentators, in terms of the Japanese concept of amae, which in this context signifies the strong emotional dependence of a child on its parent, which can persist into adulthood. Thus, the rupturing of the father-adult daughter relationship in Late Spring has been interpreted as Ozu's view of the inevitability—and necessity—of the termination of the amae relationship, although Ozu never glosses over the pain of such a rupture.

There has been considerable difference of opinion amongst commentators regarding the complicated personality of Noriko. She has been variously described as like a wife to her father, or as like a mother to him; as resembling a petulant child; or as being an enigma, particularly as to the issue of whether or not she freely chooses to marry. Even the common belief of film scholars that she is an upholder of conservative values, because of her opposition to her father's (feigned) remarriage plans, has been challenged. Robin Wood, writing about the three Norikos as one collective character, states that "Noriko" "has managed to retain and develop the finest humane values which the modern capitalist world... tramples underfoot—consideration, emotional generosity, the ability to care and empathize, and above all, awareness."

==== Prof. Shukichi Somiya ====
Noriko's father, Shukichi, works as a college professor and is the sole breadwinner of the Somiya family. It has been suggested that the character represents a transition from the traditional image of the Japanese father to a very different one. Sato points out that the national prewar ideal of the father was that of the stern patriarch, who ruled his family lovingly, but with an iron hand. Ozu himself, however, in several prewar films, such as I Was Born, But... and Passing Fancy, had undercut, according to Sato, this image of the archetypal strong father by depicting parents who were downtrodden "salarymen" (sarariman, to use the Japanese term), or poor working-class laborers, who sometimes lost the respect of their rebellious children. Bordwell has noted that "what is remarkable about Ozu's work of the 1920s and 1930s is how seldom the patriarchal norm is reestablished at the close [of each film]."

The character of Prof. Somiya represents, according to this interpretation, a further evolution of the "non-patriarchal" patriarch. Although Shukichi wields considerable moral influence over his daughter through their close relationship, that relationship is "strikingly nonoppressive." One commentator refers to Shukichi and his friend, Professor Onodera, as men who are "very much at peace, very much aware of themselves and their place in the world," and are markedly different from stereotypes of fierce Japanese males promulgated by American films during and after the World War.

It has been claimed that, after Noriko accepts Satake's marriage proposal, the film ceases to be about her, and that Prof. Somiya at that point becomes the true protagonist, with the focus of the film shifting to his increasing loneliness and grief. In this regard, a plot change that the filmmakers made from the original source material is significant. In the novel by Kazuo Hirotsu, the father's announcement to his daughter that he wishes to marry a widow is only initially a ruse; eventually, he actually does get married again. Ozu and his co-screenwriter, Noda, deliberately rejected this "witty" ending, in order to show Prof. Somiya as alone and inconsolable at the end.

== Style ==
Ozu's unique style has been widely noted by critics and scholars. Some have considered it an anti-Hollywood style, as he eventually rejected many conventions of Hollywood filmmaking. Some aspects of the style of Late Spring—which also apply to Ozu's late-period style in general, as the film is typical in almost all respects (Note: "Because [Ozu's] self-imposed rules were followed comprehensively, we can presumably find them in any part of Late Spring." See Nornes (2007), p. 88, note 1.)—include Ozu's use of the camera, his use of actors, his idiosyncratic editing and his frequent employment of a distinctive type of shot that some commentators have called a "pillow shot."

=== Ozu's use of the camera ===
==== Low angle ====
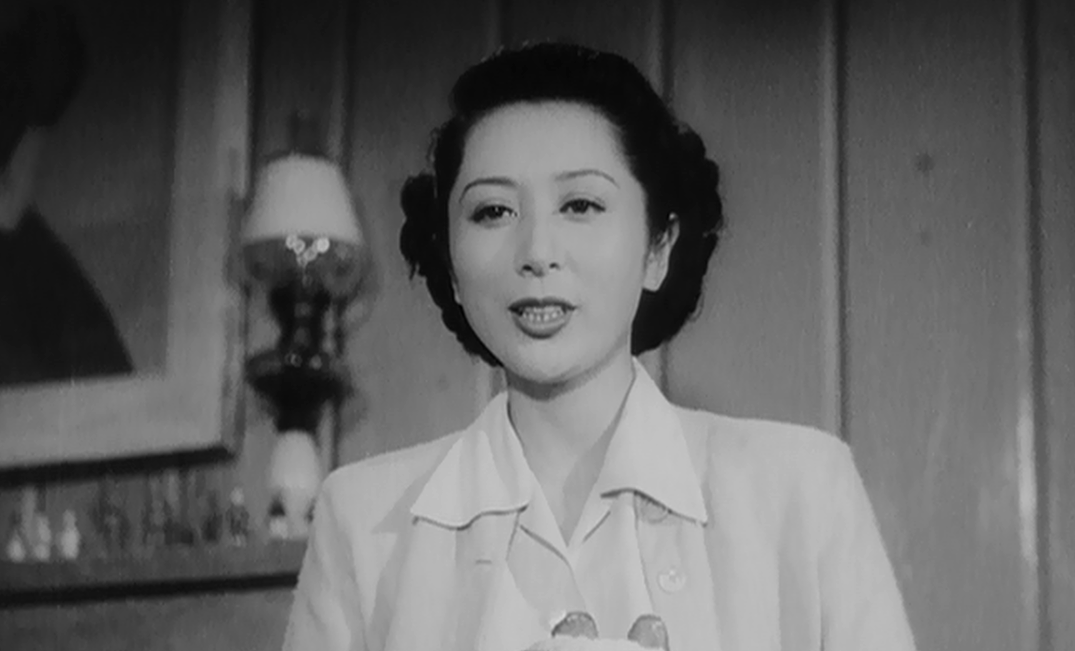
In a dialogue between Noriko and her friend Aya (Yumeji Tsukioka), Aya is seen from below, as if from the seated Noriko's point of view

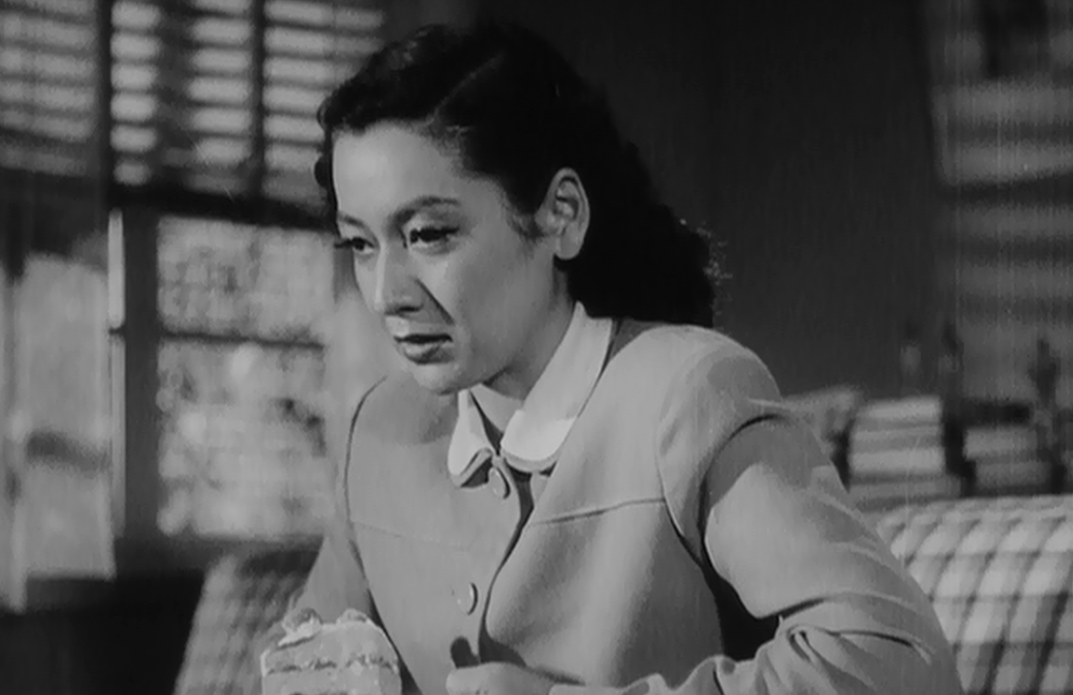
... however, in the reverse shot, Noriko is also seen from below, rather than from Aya's point of view, retaining the "low" camera angle.

Probably the most frequently noted aspect of Ozu's camera technique is his consistent use of an extremely low camera position to shoot his subjects, a practice that Bordwell traces as far back as his films of the 1931–1932 period. An example of the low camera in Late Spring would be the scene in which Noriko visits her friend Aya in her home. Noriko is in a sitting position, while Aya is seated at a slightly higher elevation, so Aya is looking down towards her friend. However, "the camera angle on both is low. Noriko sits looking up at the standing Aya, but the camera [in the reverse shot] looks up on Noriko's face, rejecting Aya's point of view. We are thus prevented from identifying with Aya and are forced into an inhuman point of view on Noriko."

There has been no critical consensus as to why Ozu consistently employed the low camera angle. Bordwell suggests that his motive was primarily visual, because the angle allowed him to create distinctive compositions within the frame and "make every image sharp, stable and striking." The film historian and critic Donald Richie believed that one of the reasons he used this technique was as a way of "exploiting the theatrical aspect of the Japanese dwelling." Another critic believes that the ultimate purpose of the low camera position was to allow the audience to assume "a viewpoint of reverence" towards the ordinary people in his films, such as Noriko and her father.

==== Static camera ====
Ozu was widely noted for a style characterized by a frequent avoidance of the kinds of camera movements—such as panning shots, tracking shots or crane shots—employed by most film directors. (As he himself would sometimes remark, "I'm not a dynamic director like Akira Kurosawa.") Bordwell notes that, of all the common technical practices that Ozu refused to emulate, he was "most absolute" in refusing to reframe (for example, by panning slightly) the moving human figure in order to keep it in view; this critic claims that there is not a single reframing in all of Ozu's films from 1930 on. In the late films (that is, those from Late Spring on), the director "will use walls, screens, or doors to block off the sides of the frame so that people walk into a central depth," thus maintaining focus on the human figure without any motion of the camera.

The filmmaker would paradoxically retain his static compositions even when a character was shown walking or riding, by moving the camera with a dolly at the precise speed at which the actor or actors moved. He would drive his devoted cameraman, Yuharu Atsuta, to tears by insisting that actors and technicians count their steps precisely during a tracking shot so that the movements of actors and camera could be synchronized. Speaking of the bicycle ride to the beach early in the story, Peña notes: "It's almost as if Noriko [on her bicycle] doesn't seem to be moving, or Hattori's not moving because his place within the frame remains constant... These are the sort of visual idiosyncrasies that make Ozu's style so interesting and so unique in a way, to give us movement and at the same time to undercut movement."

=== Ozu's use of actors ===
Virtually all actors who worked with Ozu—including Chishu Ryu, who collaborated with the director on almost all his films—agree that he was an extremely demanding taskmaster. He would direct very simple actions by the performer "to the centimeter." As opposed to those of both Mizoguchi and Kurosawa, Ozu's characters, according to Sato, are "usually calm... they not only move at the same pace but also speak at the same measured rate." He insisted that his actors express emotions through action, even rote action, rather than by directly expressing their innermost feelings. Once, when the distinguished character actress Haruko Sugimura asked the director what her character was supposed to be feeling at a given moment, Ozu responded, "You are not supposed to feel, you are supposed to do."

Sugimura, who played Aunt Masa in Late Spring, vividly depicted Ozu's approach to directing actors in her description of the scene in which Noriko is about to leave her father's house for her wedding:

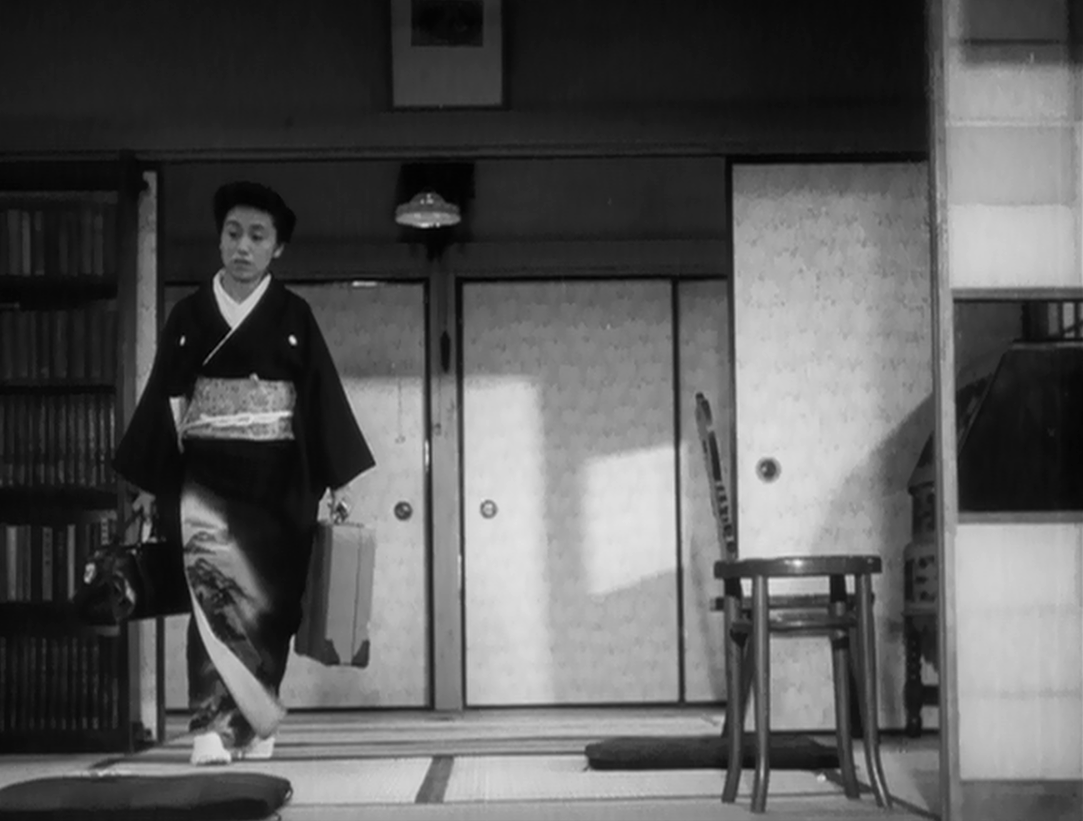
Aunt Masa (Haruko Sugimura) circles Noriko's room one last time.

Ozu told me to come [back] in the room [after she, Hara and Ryu had exited] and circle around. So I did as I was told, but of course it wasn't good enough. After the third take, Ozu approved it... The reason [Aunt Masa] circles around the room once is that she's nostalgic for all the memories there and she also wants to make sure she's left nothing behind. He didn't show each of these things explicitly, but through my smoothly circling the room—through how I moved, through the pacing and the blocking—I think that's what he was trying to express. At the time, I didn't understand. I remember I did it rhythmically: I didn't walk and I didn't run; I just moved lightly and rhythmically. As I continued doing it, that's what it turned into, and Ozu okayed it. Come to think of it, it was that way of walking rhythmically that I think was good. I did it naturally, not deliberately. And of course it was Ozu who helped me do it.

=== Editing ===
According to Richie, the editing of an Ozu film was always subordinate to the script: that is, the rhythm of each scene was decided at the screenwriting stage, and the final editing of the film reflected this. This overriding tempo even determined how the sets were constructed. Sato quotes Tomo Shimogawara, who designed the sets for The End of Summer (though the description also clearly applies to other late-period Ozu films, including Late Spring): "The size of the rooms was dictated by the time lapses between the actor's movements... Ozu would give me instructions on the exact length of the corridor. He explained that it was part and parcel of the tempo of his film, and this flow of tempo Ozu envisioned at the time the script was being written... Since Ozu never used wipes or dissolves, and for the sake of dramatic tempo as well, he would measure the number of seconds it took someone to walk upstairs and so the set had to be constructed accordingly." Sato says about this tempo that "it is a creation in which time is beautifully apprehended in conformity with the physiology of daily occurrences."

A striking fact about Ozu's late films (of which Late Spring is the first instance) is that transitions between scenes are accomplished exclusively through simple cuts. According to one commentator, the lost work, The Life of an Office Worker (Kaishain seikatsu, 1929), contained a dissolve, and several extant Ozu films of the 1930s (e.g., Tokyo Chorus and The Only Son) contain some fades. But by the time of Late Spring, these were completely eliminated, with only music cues to signal scene changes. (Ozu once spoke of the use of the dissolve as "a form of cheating.") This self-restraint by the filmmaker is now seen as very modern, because although fades, dissolves and even wipes were all part of common cinematic grammar worldwide at the time of Late Spring (and long afterwards), such devices are often considered somewhat "old fashioned" today, when straight cuts are the norm.

=== Pillow shots ===
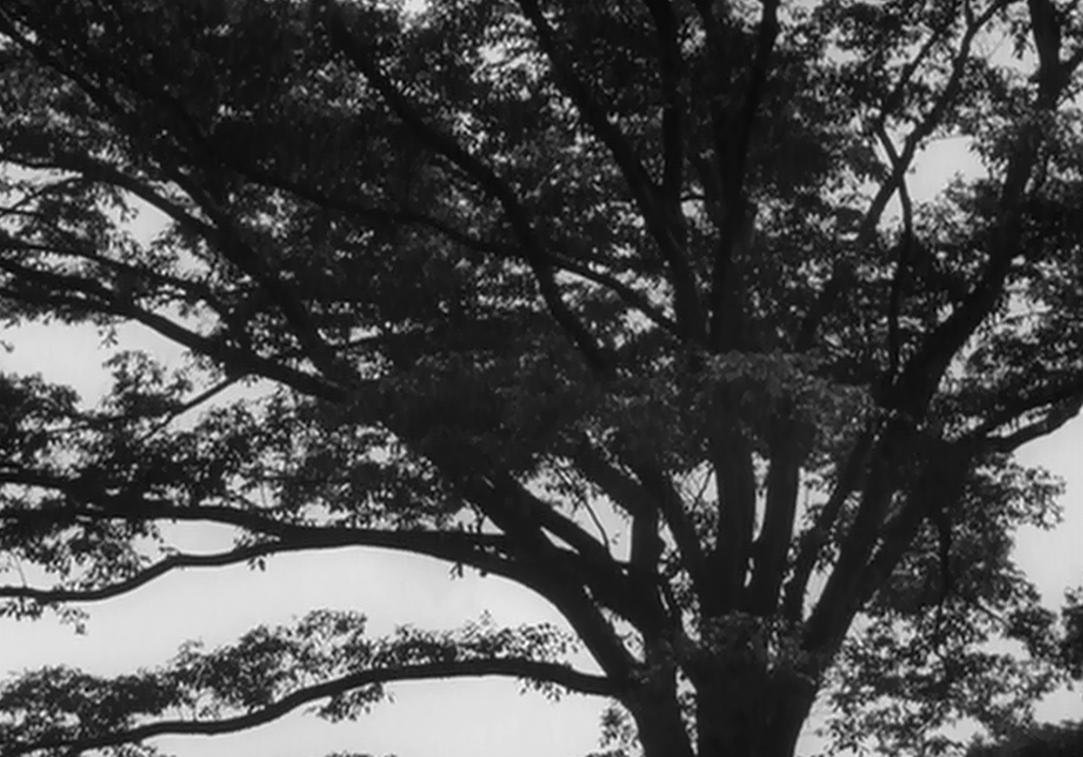
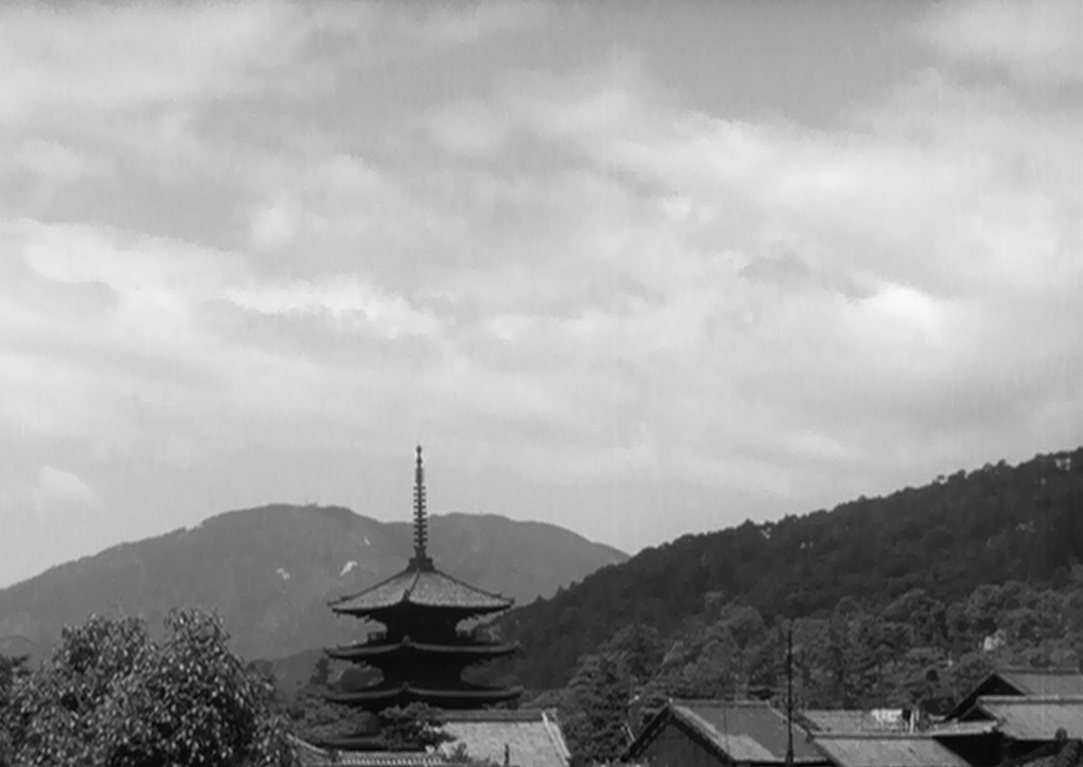
Two examples of pillow shots used in Late Spring

Many critics and scholars have commented upon the fact that frequently Ozu, instead of transitioning directly from the end of the opening credits to the first scene, or from one scene to another, interposes a shot or multiple shots—as many as six—of an object, or a group of objects, or a room, or a landscape, often (but not always) devoid of human figures. These units of film have been variously called "curtain shots," "intermediate spaces," "empty shots" or, most frequently, "pillow shots" (by analogy with the "pillow words" of classic Japanese verse).

The nature and function of these shots are disputed. Sato (citing the critic Keinosuke Nanbu) compares the shots to the use of the curtain in the Western theatre, that "both present the environment of the next sequence and stimulate the viewer's anticipation." Richie claims that they are a means of presenting only what the characters themselves perceive or think about, to enable us to "experience only what the characters are experiencing." Bordwell sees it as an expansion of the traditional transitional devices of the "placing shot" and the "cutaway," using these to convey "a loose notion of contiguity."

Some examples of pillow shots in Late Spring—as illustrated on the ozu-san.com website—are: the three shots, immediately after the opening credits, of the Kita-Kamakura railway station, followed by a shot of Kenchoji temple, "one of the five main [Zen] temples in Kamakura," in which the tea ceremony (the first scene) will take place; the shot immediately after the tea ceremony scene, showing a hillside with several nearly bare trees, which introduces a "tree-motif" associated with Noriko; a shot of a single leafy tree, appearing immediately after the Noh play scene and before the scene depicting Noriko and her father walking together, then separating; and a shot of one of the pagodas of Kyoto during the father and daughter's visit to that city late in the film.

==== The vase scene ====
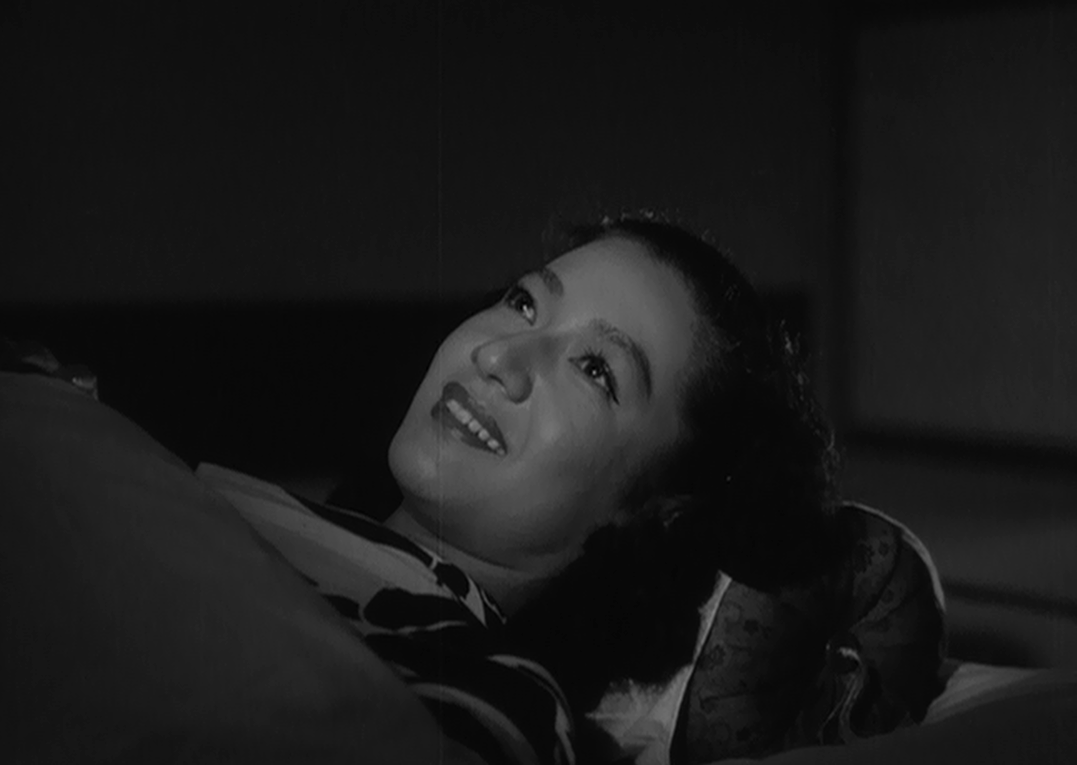
After her father falls asleep at the Kyoto inn, Noriko looks at the ceiling and smiles...

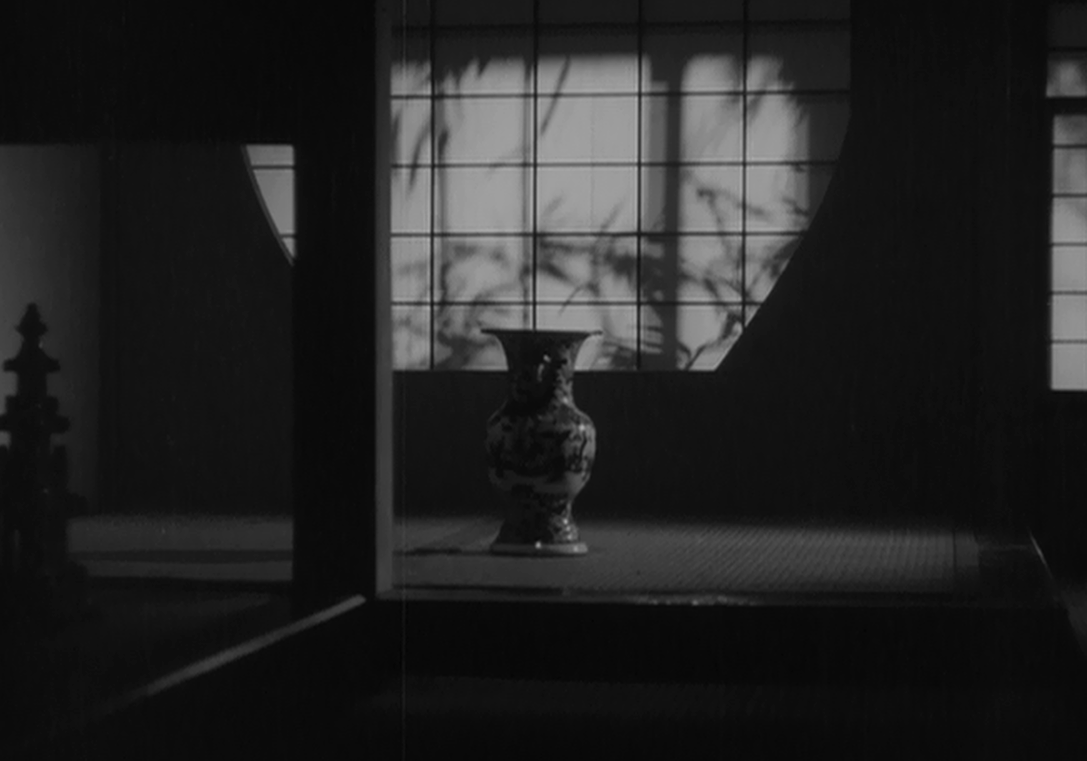
A six-second shot of a vase, in front of a shōji screen, upon which the shadows of branches are visible...

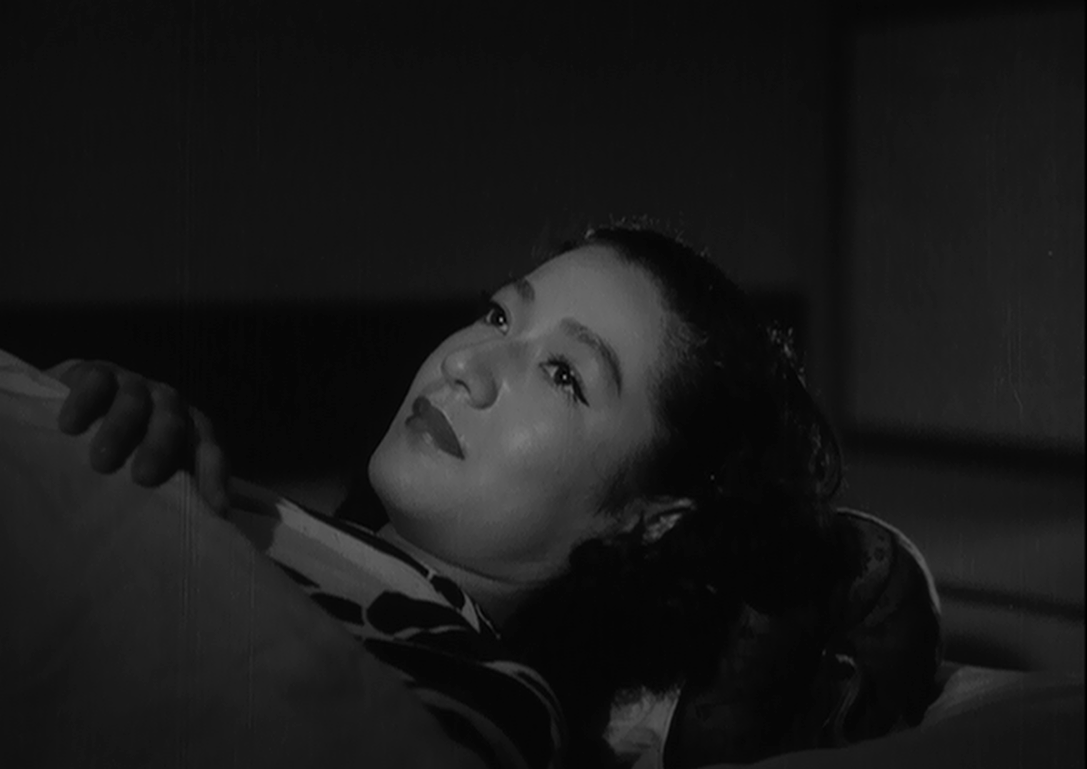
Noriko lying on futon as before, but looking upset and very near tears

The most discussed instance of a pillow shot in any Ozu film—indeed, the most famous crux in the director's work—is the scene that takes place at an inn in Kyoto, in which a vase figures prominently. During the father and daughter's last trip together, after a day sightseeing with Professor Onodera and his wife and daughter, they decide to go to sleep, and lie down on their separate futons on the floor of the inn. Noriko talks about what a nice person Onodera's new wife is, and how embarrassed she feels for having called Onodera's remarriage "filthy." Shukichi assures her that she should not worry about it, because Onodera never took her words seriously. After Noriko confesses to her father that she found the thought of his own remarriage "distasteful," she looks over to discover that he is already asleep, or seems to be. She looks up towards the ceiling and appears to smile.

There follows a six-second medium shot, in the semidarkness, of a vase on the floor in the same room, in front of a shōji screen through which the shadows of leafy branches can be seen. There is a cut back to Noriko, now looking sad and pensive, almost in tears. Then there is a ten-second shot of the same vase, identical to the earlier one, as the music on the soundtrack swells, cuing the next scene (which takes place at the Ryōan-ji rock garden in Kyoto, the following day).

Abé Mark Nornes, in an essay entitled "The Riddle of the Vase: Ozu Yasujirō's Late Spring (1949)," observes: "Nothing in all of Ozu's films has sparked such conflicting explanations; everyone seems compelled to weigh in on this scene, invoking it as a key example in their arguments." Nornes speculates that the reason for this is the scene's "emotional power and its unusual construction. The vase is clearly essential to the scene. The director not only shows it twice, but he lets both shots run for what would be an inordinate amount of time by the measure of most filmmakers." To one commentator, the vase represents "stasis," and is thus "an expression of something unified, permanent, transcendent." Another critic describes the vase and other Ozu "still lifes" as "containers for our emotions." Yet another specifically disputes this interpretation, identifying the vase as "a non-narrative element wedged into the action." A fourth scholar sees it as an instance of the filmmaker's deliberate use of "false POV" (point of view), since Noriko is never shown actually looking at the vase the audience sees. A fifth asserts that the vase is "a classic feminine symbol." And yet another suggests several alternative interpretations, including the vase as "a symbol of traditional Japanese culture," and as an indicator of Noriko's "sense that... [her] relationship with her father has been changed."

The French philosopher-film theorist Gilles Deleuze, in his book L'image-temps. Cinéma 2 (Cinema 2: The Time-Image, 1985), cited this particular scene as an example of what he referred to as the "time image." Simply put, Deleuze sees the vase as an image of unchanging time, although objects within time (for example, Noriko) do change (e.g., from joy to sadness). "The vase in Late Spring is interposed between [Noriko's] half smile and the beginning of her tears. There is becoming, change, passage. But the form of what changes does not itself change, does not pass on. This is time, time itself, 'a little bit of time in its pure state': a direct time-image, which gives what changes the unchanging form in which the change is produced... The still life is time, for everything that changes is in time, but time does not itself change... Ozu's still lifes endure, have a duration, over ten seconds of the vase: this duration of the vase is precisely the representation of that which endures, through the succession of changing states."

== Interpretations ==
Like many celebrated works of cinema, Late Spring has inspired varied and often contradictory critical and scholarly interpretations. The two most common interpretations of Late Spring are: a) the view that the film represents one of a series of Ozu works that depict part of a universal and inevitable "life cycle", and is thus either duplicated or complemented by other Ozu works in the series; b) the view that the film, while similar in theme and even plot to other Ozu works, calls for a distinct critical approach, and that the work is in fact critical of marriage, or at least the particular marriage depicted in it.

=== The film as part of "life cycle" series ===
Ozu's films, both individually and collectively, are often seen as representing either a universal human life cycle or a portion of such a cycle. Ozu himself at least once spoke in such terms. "I wanted in this picture [Early Summer] to show a life cycle. I wanted to depict mutability (rinne). I was not interested in action for its own sake. And I've never worked so hard in my life."

Those who hold this interpretation argue that this aspect of Ozu's work gives it its universality, and helps it transcend the specifically Japanese cultural context in which the films were created. Bock writes: "The subject matter of the Ozu film is what faces all of us born of man and woman and going on to produce offspring of our own: the family... [The terms "shomingeki" or "home drama"] may be applied to Ozu's works and create an illusion of peculiar Japaneseness, but in fact behind the words are the problems we all face in a life cycle. They are the struggles of self-definition, of individual freedom, of disappointed expectations, of the impossibility of communication, of separation and loss brought about by the inevitable passages of marriage and death." Bock suggests that Ozu's wish to portray the life cycle affected his decisions on technical matters, such as the construction and use of the sets of his films. "In employing the set like a curtainless stage Ozu allows for implication of transitoriness in the human condition. Allied with the other aspects of ritual in Ozu's techniques, it reinforces the feeling that we are watching a representative life cycle."

According to Geist, Ozu wished to convey the concept of sabi, which she defines as "an awareness of the ephemeral": "Much of what is ephemeral is also cyclical; thus, sabi includes an awareness of the cyclical, which is evinced both formally and thematically in Ozu's films. Often, they revolve around passages in the human life cycle, usually the marriage of a child or the death of a parent." She points out scenes that are carefully duplicated in Late Spring, evoking this cyclical theme: "Noriko and her father's friend [Onodera] sit in a bar and talk about [Onodera's] remarriage, which Noriko condemns. In the film's penultimate sequence, the father and Noriko's friend Aya sit in a bar after Noriko's wedding. The scene is shot from exactly the same angles as was the first bar scene, and again the subject is remarriage."

=== The film as a critique of marriage ===
A critical tendency opposing the "life cycle" theory emphasizes the differences in tone and intent between this film and other Ozu works that deal with similar themes, situations and characters. These critics are also highly skeptical of the widely held notion that Ozu regarded marriage (or at least the marriage in Late Spring) favorably. As critic Roger Ebert explains, "Late Spring began a cycle of Ozu films about families... Did he make the same film again and again? Not at all. Late Spring and Early Summer are startlingly different. In the second, Noriko takes advantage of a conversational opening [about marriage] to overturn the entire plot... she accepts a man [as husband] she has known for a long time—a widower with a child." In contrast, "what happens [in Late Spring] at deeper levels is angry, passionate and—wrong, we feel, because the father and the daughter are forced to do something neither one of them wants to do, and the result will be resentment and unhappiness." Ebert goes on, "It is universally believed, just as in a Jane Austen novel, that a woman of a certain age is in want of a husband. Late Spring is a film about two people who desperately do not believe this, and about how they are undone by their tact, their concern for each other, and their need to make others comfortable by seeming to agree with them." The film "tells a story that becomes sadder the more you think about it." Ebert included the film in his Great Movies list.

Late Spring, in Wood's view, "is about the sacrifice of Noriko's happiness in the interest of maintaining and continuing 'tradition,' [which sacrifice] takes the form of her marriage, and everyone in the film—including the father and finally the defeated Noriko herself—is complicit in it." He asserts that, in contradiction to the view of many critics, the film "is not about a young woman trying nobly to sacrifice herself and her own happiness in order dutifully to serve her widowed father in his lonely old age," because her life as a single young woman is one she clearly prefers: "With her father, Noriko has a freedom that she will never again regain." He points out that there is an unusual (for Ozu) degree of camera movement in the first half of the film, as opposed to the "stasis" of the second half, and that this corresponds to Noriko's freedom in the first half and the "trap" of her impending marriage in the second. Rather than perceiving the Noriko films as a cycle, Wood asserts that the trilogy is "unified by its underlying progressive movement, a progression from the unqualified tragedy of Late Spring through the ambiguous 'happy ending' of Early Summer to the authentic and fully earned note of bleak and tentative hope at the end of Tokyo Story."

== Reception and Legacy ==
=== Reception and reputation of the film in Japan ===
Late Spring was released in Japan on September 19, 1949. Basing his research upon files kept on the film by the Allied censorship, Sorensen notes: "Generally speaking, [the film] was hailed with enthusiasm by Japanese critics when it opened at theaters." The publication Shin Yukan, in its review of September 20, emphasized the scenes that take place in Kyoto, describing them as embodying "the calm Japanese atmosphere" of the entire work. Both Shin Yukan and another publication, Tokyo Shinbun (in its review of September 26), considered the film beautiful and the former called it a "masterpiece." There were, however, some cavils: the critic of Asahi Shinbun (September 23) complained that "the tempo is not the feeling of the present period" and the reviewer from Hochi Shinbun (September 21) warned that Ozu should choose more progressive themes, or else he would "coagulate."

In 1950, the film became the fifth Ozu work overall, and the first of the postwar period, to top the Kinema Junpo poll, making it the Japanese critics' Best Film of 1949. In addition, that year the film won four prizes at the distinguished Mainichi Film Awards, sponsored by the newspaper Mainichi Shinbun: Best Film, Best Director, Best Screenplay and Best Actress (Setsuko Hara, who was also honored for two other films in which she appeared in 1949).

In a 2009 poll by Kinema Junpo of the best Japanese films of all time, nine Ozu films appeared. Late Spring was the second-highest-rated film, tying for 36th place.

Ozu's younger contemporary, Akira Kurosawa, in 1999 published a conversation with his daughter Kazuko in which he provided his unranked personal listing of the top 100 films of all time. One of the works he selected was Late Spring, with the following comment: "[Ozu's] characteristic camera work was imitated by many directors abroads [sic] as well, i.e., many people saw and see Mr. Ozu's movies, right? That's good. Indeed, one can learn pretty much from his movies. Young prospective movie makers in Japan should, I hope, see more of Ozu's work."

=== Reception and reputation of the film outside Japan ===
New Yorker Films released the film in North America on July 21, 1972. Of the New York-based critics of the time, six (Stuart Byron of The Village Voice, Charles Michener of Newsweek, Vincent Canby of The New York Times, Archer Winsten of The New York Post, Judith Crist of The Today Show and Stanley Kauffmann of The New Republic) gave the work a favorable review, and one (John Simon of New York) gave it a "mixed" review.

Canby observed that "the difficulty with Ozu is not in appreciating his films... [but] in describing an Ozu work in a way that doesn't diminish it, that doesn't reduce it to an inventory of his austere techniques, and that accurately reflects the unsentimental humanism of this discipline." He called the characters played by Ryu and Hara "immensely affecting—gentle, loving, amused, thinking and feeling beings," and praised the filmmaker for his "profound respect for [the characters'] privacy, for the mystery of their emotions. Because of this—not in spite of this—his films, of which Late Spring is one of the finest, are so moving."

Byron called Late Spring "Ozu's greatest achievement and, thus, one of the ten best films of all time."

In Variety, Robert B. Frederick also had high praise for the work. "Although made in 1949," he wrote, "this infrequently-seen example of the cinematic mastery of the late Yasujirō Ozu... compares more than favorably with any major Japanese film... A heartwarming and very worthy cinematic effort."

On the review aggregator site Rotten Tomatoes, Late Spring has an approval rating of 100% based on 26 critics. Kurosawa biographer Stuart Galbraith IV, reviewing the Criterion Collection DVD, called the work "archetypal postwar Ozu" and "a masterful distillation of themes its director would return to again and again... There are better Ozu films, but Late Spring impressively boils the director's concerns down to their most basic elements." Norman Holland concluded that "Ozu has created—in the best Japanese manner—a film explicitly beautiful but rich in ambiguity and the unexpressed." Dennis Schwartz called it "a beautiful drama," in which "there's nothing artificial, manipulative or sentimental." Leonard Maltin awarded the film four out of four stars, calling it "A transcendent and profoundly moving work rivaling Tokyo Story as the director's masterpiece."

In the 2012 Sight and Sound critic's poll of the greatest films of all time Late Spring was ranked in 15th place.. The film ranked 53rd in BBC's 2018 list of The 100 greatest foreign language films voted by 209 film critics from 43 countries around the world. The Village Voice ranked it at number 112 in its Top 250 "Best Films of the Century" list in 1999, based on a poll of critics. In the 2022 Sight and Sound critic's poll, Late Spring was ranked at 21st place, tying with The Passion of Joan of Arc. In the 2022 director's poll, the film was ranked at 62nd place.

=== Films inspired by Late Spring ===
One remake of Late Spring has so far been filmed: a television movie titled A Daughter's Marriage (Musume no kekkon), directed by Kon Ichikawa and produced by the Japanese pay television channel WOWOW. It was broadcast on December 14, 2003, two days after the 100th anniversary of Ozu's birth (and 40th anniversary of his death). The film recreated various idiosyncrasies of the late director's style. For example, Ichikawa included many shots with vividly red objects, in imitation of Ozu's well-known fondness for red in his own color films (although Late Spring was not itself shot in color).

In addition, a number of works wholly or partly inspired by the original 1949 film have been released over the years. The most obvious variation of Late Spring in Ozu's own work is Late Autumn, which deals again with a daughter who reacts negatively to the false rumor of the remarriage of a parent and ultimately gets married herself. One scholar refers to this film as "a version of Late Spring", while another describes it as "a revision of Late Spring, with Akiko (played by Hara, the daughter in the earlier film) taking the father's role." Other Ozu films also contain plot elements first established by the 1949 film, though somewhat altered. For example, the 1958 film Equinox Flower (Higanbana), the director's first in color, focuses on a marriageable daughter, though as one scholar points out, the plot is a "reversal" of Late Spring in that the father at first opposes his daughter's marriage.

The French director Claire Denis has acknowledged that her 2008 film 35 Shots of Rum (35 Rhums) is a homage to Ozu. "This film is also a sort of... not copy, but it has stolen a lot to [sic] a famous Ozu film called Late Spring... [Ozu] was trying to show through few characters... the relation between human beings."

Because of perceived similarities, in subject matter and in his contemplative approach, Taiwanese director Hou Hsiao-hsien has been called "an artistic heir to Ozu." In 2003, to celebrate Ozu's centennial, Shochiku, the studio where Ozu worked throughout his career, commissioned Hou to make a film in tribute. The resulting work, Café Lumière (Kōhī Jikō, 2003), has been called, "in its way, a version of the Late Spring story, updated to the early 21st Century."

Perhaps the strangest tribute of all belongs to the Japanese pinku (pink film) genre of softcore films: Abnormal Family, also known as Spring Bride or My Brother's Wife (Hentai kazoku: Aniki no yomesan, 1983), by director Masayuki Suo. It has been called "perhaps the only film that ever replicated Ozu's style down to the most minute detail. The story, style, characters, and settings constantly invoke Ozu's iconography, and especially Late Spring." As in Ozu's classic, the narrative has a wedding which is never shown on screen and Suo consistently imitates the older master's "much posited predilection for carefully composed static shots from a low camera angle... affectionately poking fun at the restrained and easy going 'life goes on' philosophy of its model."

== Home media ==
Late Spring was released on VHS in an English-subtitled version by New Yorker Video in November 1994.

In 2003, Shochiku marked the centennial of Ozu's birth by releasing a Region 2 DVD of the film in Japan (with no English subtitles). In the same year, the Hong Kong-based distributor Panorama released a Region 0 (worldwide) DVD of the film, in NTSC format, but with English and Chinese subtitles.

In 2004, Bo Ying, a Chinese distributor, released a Region 0 DVD of Late Spring in NTSC format with English, Chinese and Japanese subtitles. In 2005, Tartan released a Region 0, English-subtitled DVD of the film, in PAL format, as Volume One of its Triple Digipak series of Ozu's Noriko Trilogy.

In 2006, The Criterion Collection released a two-disc set with a restored high-definition digital transfer and new subtitle translations. It also includes Tokyo-Ga, an Ozu tribute by director Wim Wenders; an audio commentary by Richard Peña; and essays by Michael Atkinson and Donald Richie. In 2009, the Australian distributor Madman Entertainment released an English-subtitled Region 4 DVD of the film in PAL format.

In June 2010, BFI released the film on Region B-locked Blu-ray. The release includes a 24-page illustrated booklet as well as Ozu's earlier film The Only Son, also in HD, and a DVD copy of both films (in Region 2 and PAL). In April 2012, Criterion released a Blu-ray version of the film. This release contains the same supplements as Criterion's DVD version.

== See also ==
- Cinema of Asia
- Cinema of Japan
- List of film director and cinematographer collaborations
- List of films in the public domain in the United States

== Works cited ==
- 35 Shots of Rum (DVD). Cinema Guild.
- Anderson, Joseph L.; Donald Richie (1982). The Japanese Film: art and industry. Princeton University Press. ISBN 0-691-00792-6.
- Bock, Audie (1978). Japanese Film Directors. Kodansha International Ltd. ISBN 0-87011-304-6.
- Bordwell, David (1988). Ozu and the Poetics of Cinema. Princeton University Press. ISBN 0-85170-158-2.
- Deleuze, Gilles; Hugh Tomlinson and Robert Galeta, translators (1989). Cinema 2: The Time-Image. The Athlone Press. ISBN 0-8264-7706-2.
- Geist, Kathe (1992). "Narrative Strategies in Ozu's Late Films". In Arthur Nolletti Jr. and David Desser (ed.). Reframing Japanese Cinema: Authorship, Genre, History. Indiana University Press. ISBN 0-253-34108-6.
- High, Peter B. (2003). The Imperial Screen: Japanese Film Culture in the Fifteen Years' War, 1931–1945. The University of Wisconsin Press. ISBN 0-299-18134-0.
- Hirano, Kyoko (2002). Mr. Smith Goes to Tokyo. Smithsonian Institution Press. ISBN 1-56098-402-3.
- Late Spring (DVD). Criterion.
- Nornes, Abé Mark (2007). "The Riddle of the Vase: Ozu Yasujirō's Late Spring (1949)". In Alistair Phillips and Julian Stringer (ed.). Japanese Cinema: Texts and Contexts. Routledge. ISBN 978-0-415-32848-7.
- Richie, Donald (1974). Ozu. University of California Press, Ltd. ISBN 0-520-03277-2.
- Russell, Catherine (2008). The Cinema of Mikio Naruse: Women and Japanese Modernity. Duke University Press. ISBN 978-0-822-34312-7.
- Sato, Tadao (1987). Currents in Japanese Cinema. Kodansha International Ltd. ISBN 0-87011-815-3.
- Schrader, Paul (1972). Transcendental Style in Film: Ozu, Bresson, Dreyer. University of California Press. ISBN 0-306-80335-6.
- Sorensen, Lars-Martin (2009). Censorship of Japanese Films During the U.S. Occupation of Japan: The Cases of Yasujirō Ozu and Akira Kurosawa. The Edwin Mellen Press Ltd. ISBN 978-0-7734-4673-1.
- Thompson, Kristin (1988). Breaking the Glass Armor: Neoformalist Film Analysis. Princeton University Press. ISBN 0-691-01453-1.
- Thomson, David (2004). The New Biographical Dictionary of Film: Updated and Expanded (5th ed.). Knopf. ISBN 0-307-27174-9.
- Torres Hortelano, Lorenzo J. (2006). "Primavera tardía" de Yasujiro Ozu: cine clásico y poética zen (1st ed.). Caja España, Valladolid. ISBN 84-95917-24-6.
- Tokyo Story (DVD). Criterion (number 217).
- Wood, Robin (1998). "Resistance to Definition; Ozu's "Noriko" Trilogy". Sexual Politics and Narrative Film: Hollywood and Beyond. Columbia University Press. ISBN 0-231-07604-5.
- Wood, Robin (2000). "Late Spring [entry]". In Tom Pendergast, Sara Pendergast (ed.). International Dictionary of Films and Filmmakers, Vol. 1 – Films. St. James Press. ISBN 1-55862-450-3.
