= Akatsuki (TV series) =

- Genre: Drama
- Composer: Ichirō Saitō
- Country of origin: Japan
- Original language: Japanese

Production
- Running time: 15 minutes

Original release
- Network: NHK
- Release: April 1, 1963 – April 4, 1964

Akatsuki (あかつき) is a Japanese television drama series. It debuted on April 1, 1963, and was broadcast until April 4, 1964. It was the third Asadora series broadcast on NHK. It starred Shin Saburi as a college professor who quit his job to try to become a painter.

== Cast ==
- Shin Saburi as Shōnosuke Sada
- Michiko Araki as Toshiko Sada, Shōnosuke's wife
- Nobuo Tsukamoto as Shōzō Sada, Shōnosuke's eldest son
- Keiko Iida as Ayako Sada, Shōnosuke's eldest daughter
- Yoko Kawaguchi as Yoko Sada, Shōnosuke's second daughter
- Eiko Muramatsu as Chizu Sada
- Hisano Yamaoka as Akiko
- Kyûzô Kawabe as Nojima
- Ayako Hōshō as the Director's wife
- Minako Osanai as Hisako
- Jun Usami as Ōnishi
