= Arupusu monogatari Yasei =

- Directed by: Tsutomu Sawamura
- Written by: Kaneto Shindō
- Cinematography: Yoshio Aida
- Production companies: Oizumi Eiga; Geiken Production
- Release date: September 1950 (Japan)
- Running time: 100 mins.
- Country: Japan
- Language: Japanese

Arupusu monogatari Yasei (アルプス物語 野性, lit. "Alps story: The wild"), also titled Yasei (野性, lit. "The wild"), is a 1950 Japanese film directed by Tsutomu Sawamura. It tells the story of a girl who grew up in the mountains of Mount Norikura, who abandons her city life to return to the mountains.

== Cast ==
- Setsuko Hara
- Hajime Izu
- Kuniko Miyake
- Sakae Ozawa
