= The Masseurs and a Woman =

1938 Japanese film

- Film poster

Japanese name
- Kanji: 按摩と女
- Directed by: Hiroshi Shimizu
- Written by: Hiroshi Shimizu
- Starring: Mieko Takamine; Shin Tokudaiji; Shin Saburi
- Cinematography: Masao Saitō
- Music by: Senji Itō
- Production company: Shochiku
- Distributed by: Shochiku
- Release date: 7 July 1938 (Japan)
- Running time: 66 minutes
- Country: Japan
- Language: Japanese

The Masseurs and a Woman (1938) by Hiroshi Shimizu

The Masseurs and a Woman (Japanese: 按摩と女, Hepburn: Anma to onna) is a 1938 Japanese comedy-drama film written and directed by Hiroshi Shimizu.

== Plot ==
The movie opens with Toku and his fellow blind masseur friend Fuku walking down a mountain path, heading for a spa town where they have been hired to serve the guests. Toku develops an affection for a female customer who passed him on his way to the village and whom he recognises by her distinct Tokyo smell. The woman also awakens the interest of guest Shintarō, who arrived together with his little nephew. When a series of thefts occurs, Toku, believing that she is the culprit, wants to help her escape. Instead, he not only learns that she is innocent, but also that she is on the run from her patron whom she dislikes. The next day, she leaves the village in a carriage with a man, possibly her patron, witnessed by Toku and Shintarō and his nephew.

== Cast ==
- Mieko Takamine as Michiho Misawa
- Shin Tokudaiji as Tokuichi
- Shinichi Himori as Fukuinchi Misawa
- Shin Saburi as Shintarō Omura
- Bakudan Kozo as Kenichi
- Takeshi Sakamoto as Manager of the Kujira Inn
- Zentaro Iijima as Kamekichi
- Hideko Kasuga as Okiku
- Chieko Kyotani (credited as Chieko Kyoya) as Oaki
- Toru Hirose as Hiking student
- Akio Isono as Hiking student
- Toshiaki Konoe as Hiking student
- Fusako Maki as Hiking girl
- Mitsuko Miura as Hiking girl
- Ayuko Hirano as Hiking girl

== Legacy ==
Film scholar Alexander Jacoby describes The Masseurs and a Woman as part of a group of three Shimizu films (together with Mr. Thank You and Ornamental Hairpin) which "were bittersweet studies of grown-up feelings" and "group portraits set among temporary communities" that "concentrated more on the delineation of character than on plot". Distanced from social and political realities and with its largely personal concerns, it conformed, according to Jacoby, with the producing company Shochiku's tradition of Ōfuna flavor films (low-key domestic dramas, named after the location of the company's studios).

== Home media ==
The Criterion Collection released the film in the US on DVD in 2009 as part of the Eclipse Series 15: "Travels with Hiroshi Shimizu".
