= Brothers and Sisters of the Toda Family =

1941 film by Yasujiro Ozu

Toda-ke no kyōdai
- HK DVD Cover
- Directed by: Yasujirō Ozu
- Written by: Tadao Ikeda; Yasujirō Ozu
- Starring: Mieko Takamine; Shin Saburi; Hideo Fujino; Fumiko Katsuragi
- Cinematography: Yūharu Atsuta
- Edited by: Yoshiyasu Hamamura
- Music by: Senji Itō
- Production company: Shochiku
- Distributed by: Shochiku
- Release date: 1 March 1941 (Japan)
- Running time: 106 minutes
- Country: Japan
- Language: Japanese

Brothers and Sisters of the Toda Family (Japanese: 戸田家の兄妹, Hepburn: Toda-ke no kyōdai) is a 1941 Japanese drama film directed by Yasujirō Ozu.

== Plot ==
The upper-class Toda family celebrates the 69th birthday of their father Shintarō with a commemorative outdoor photoshoot. Shortly after the photo session, he suffers a fatal heart attack. After his death, the eldest son Shin'ichirō announces that, as their father had acted as a guarantor for a company which has gone bankrupt, they must help pay off that company's debts. The family sells off all their late father's properties and valuable possessions, leaving only an old house by the sea. Meanwhile, their mother and the youngest daughter Setsuko go to stay with Shin'ichirō and his wife. The unmarried second brother Shōjirō takes the opportunity to move from Japan to Tianjin, China (which had been occupied by Japan during the Second Sino-Japanese War).

Mrs. Toda and Setsuko encounter difficulty living with Shin'ichirō's abrasive wife Kazuko and go to stay with Chizuko, the married eldest sister, instead. However, Setsuko's plans to seek work outside the home are met with vehement objections from Chizuko, who thinks it disgraceful for the daughter of an upper-class family. Chizuko also clashes with her mother over Chizuko's son Ryokichi, who has been playing truant from school. Instead of accepting the offer of the middle sister Ayako to have Mrs. Toda ane Setsuko live with her and her husband, they decide to move out to the unsold and dilapidated house by the sea. Ayako and her husband are privately relieved at not having to take them in.

On the first anniversary of Shintarō's death, the family comes together for a ceremonial gathering. Shōjirō arrives in time for the family dinner and is shocked to learn that his mother and Setsuko are living alone in the old house. He strongly reprimands his brother and sisters for not doing their part as her children and urges them to leave the gathering at once, which they do. After dinner, Shōjirō invites his mother and Setsuko to live with him in Tianjin, to which they agree. Setsuko tries to arrange a marriage between Shōjirō and her unmarried friend Tokiko, who has come for a visit, but Shōjirō runs off to the beach before she can introduce them.

== Cast ==
- Mieko Takamine - Setsuko Toda
- Shin Saburi - Shōjirō Toda
- Hideo Fujino - Shintarō Toda
- Fumiko Katsuragi - Mrs. Toda
- Mitsuko Yoshikawa - Chizuru
- Chishū Ryū - Friend
- Masao Hayama - Ryokichi
- Tatsuo Saitō - Shin'ichirō
- Kuniko Miyake - Kazuko
- Michiko Kuwano - Tokiko

== Production and reception ==
Brothers and Sisters of the Toda Family was Ozu's first film after a three year hiatus. Unsatisfied with his salary paid by the Shochiku film studio, Ozu approached the company's president, Shirō Kido, asking for a raise, which Kido conditioned on the outcome of his next film. During filming, Ozu was pressured into a tight shooting schedule by Shochiku.

Brothers and Sisters of the Toda Family was honoured as "Best Film of the Year" by Kinema Junpo. It was Ozu's first box office hit, which he ascribed to the popularity of its stars, Shin Saburi and Mieko Takamine, who both worked with Ozu for the first time. As a result, Ozu received a long-term contract from the studio.

== Home media ==
In 2010, the BFI released a Region 2 DVD of the film as a bonus feature on its Dual Format Edition (Blu-ray + DVD) of Tokyo Story.
