= Hiroshi Shimizu =

Hiroshi Shimizu may refer to:

- Hiroshi Shimizu (director) (1903–1966), Japanese film director
- Hiroshi Shimizu (director, born 1964), Japanese film director, 1998 Toronto International Film Festival
- Hiroshi Shimizu (professor), professor at Keio University, project leader of Eliica
