= Our Neighbor, Miss Yae =

1934 Japanese film

- 隣の八重ちゃん
- Directed by: Yasujirō Shimazu
- Written by: Yasujirō Shimazu
- Starring: Yukichi Iwata; Chōko Iida; Yoshiko Okada; Yumeko Aizome; Sanae Takasugi
- Cinematography: Subaru Kuwahara
- Production company: Shochiku
- Distributed by: Shochiku
- Release date: 28 June 1934 (Japan)
- Running time: 77 minutes
- Country: Japan
- Language: Japanese

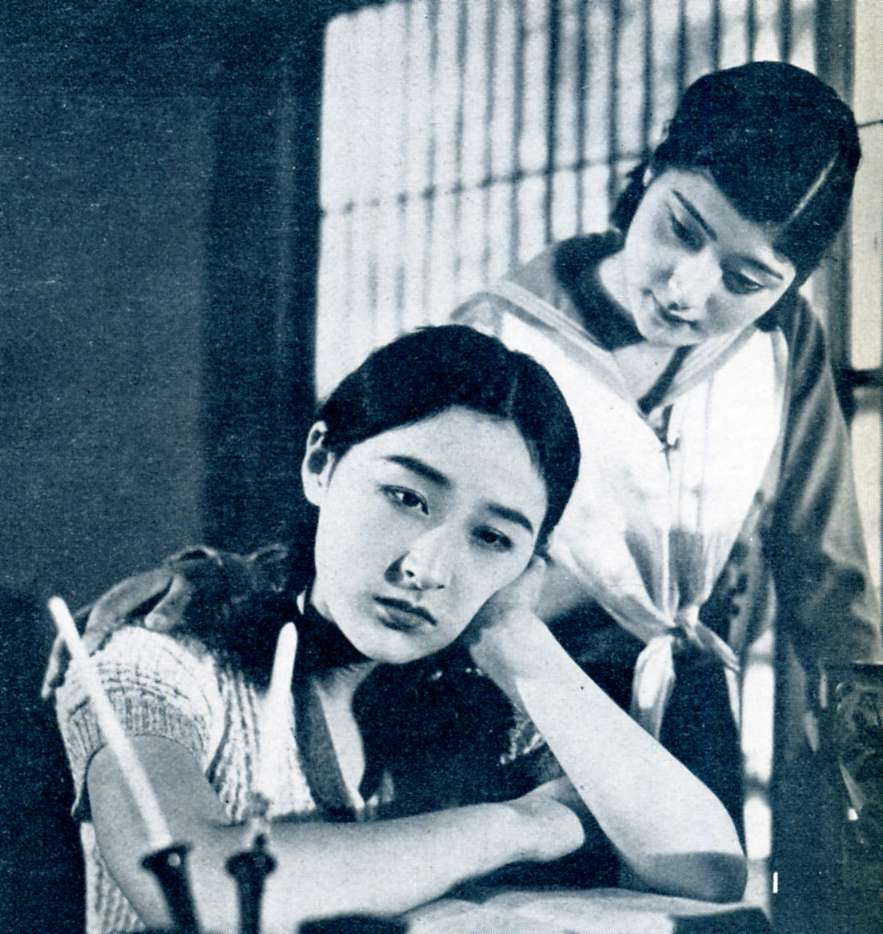
Yumeko Aizome and Sanae Takasugi in the movie.

Our Neighbor, Miss Yae (Japanese: 隣の八重ちゃん, Hepburn: Tonari no Yae-chan) is a 1934 Japanese comedy-drama film written and directed by Yasujirō Shimazu. It is regarded as one of Shimazu's major films, and a representative work of the shōshimin-eiga ("lower middle class film") genre.

== Plot ==
In a Tokyo suburb, Keitarō, the older son of the Arai family, and Yae, the younger daughter of the Hattori family, are not only neighbours and schoolmates, but also have developed unspoken feelings for each other. When Yae's older sister Kyōko leaves her husband and returns home, she becomes a cause of concern for her parents and also for Yae, as Kyōko starts taking an interest in Keitarō. After Mr. Hattori is transferred to Korea by his employer, Yae's and Keitarō's separation seems inevitable, but the Hattoris decide to leave Yae as a boarder with the Arais to finish high school.

== Cast ==
- Yukichi Iwata as Shōsaku Hattori
- Chōko Iida as Hamako Hattori
- Yoshiko Okada as Kyōko Hattori
- Yumeko Aizome as Yaeko Hattori, called Yae
- Sanae Takasugi as Etsuko Manabe
- Ryōtarō Mizushima as Ikuzo Arai
- Fumiko Katsuragi as Matsuko Arai
- Den Obinata as Keitarō Arai
- Akio Isono as Seiji Arai
- Shōzaburō Abe as Glazier

== Reception and legacy ==
In Kinema Junpo's list of the ten best Japanese films of 1934, Our Neighbor, Miss Yae ranked #2 behind Yasujirō Ozu's A Story of Floating Weeds.

In the British Film Institute's 2020 list of "The best Japanese film of every year – from 1925 to now", film historian Alexander Jacoby called the film a "subtle, charming, funny and bittersweet story of family life", which perfectly illustrates "its director's penchant for understated melodrama and his beguiling blend of humour and pathos".

Our Neighbor, Miss Yae was shown at the Berkeley Art Museum and Pacific Film Archive in 2005.

== Background ==
The animation short which the protagonists are watching in the cinema is Ha! Ha! Ha! by the Fleischer Studios.
