= Yasujirō Shimazu =

Japanese film director

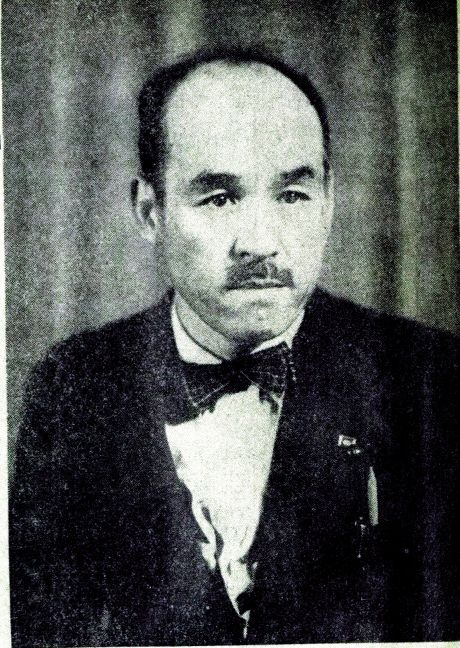
- Yasujirō Shimazu in 1939
- Born: June 3, 1897; Tokyo, Japan
- Died: September 18, 1945 (aged 48); Tokyo, Japan
- Occupations: Film director, screenwriter
- Years active: 1920–1944

Yasujirō Shimazu (島津 保次郎, Shimazu Yasujirō; 3 June 1897 – 18 September 1945) was a Japanese film director and screenwriter, and a pioneer of the shōshimin-eiga (common people drama) genre at the Shōchiku studios in pre-World War II Japan.

== Biography ==
Shimazu was born in Tokyo, (Note: Depending on the source, either in Kanda or in Nihonbashi district.) the second son of merchant Otojirō Shimazu. His father owned a long-established seaweed business named Kōshū-ya directly in front of the main Mitsukoshi department store in Nihonbashi.

Shimazu entered Shōchiku in 1920 after answering an advertisement and began training under Kaoru Osanai. He gave his debut as director in 1921 at Shōchiku's recently established Kamata studio, directing both comedy and melodrama films, often depicting the everyday life of the lower middle classes. Our Neighbor, Miss Yae (1934) and A Brother and His Younger Sister (1939) are regarded as his most exemplary and best films. By the end of the 1930s, he moved to Tōhō studios, where he made some films in cooperation with the Manchuria Film Association. He died of cancer just after the war ended. Many famous directors, such as Heinosuke Gosho, Shirō Toyoda, Kōzaburō Yoshimura, and Keisuke Kinoshita, started their careers as his assistant.

== Selected filmography ==
- 1930: The Belle (麗人, Reijin)
- 1931: Lifeline ABC (生活線ABC, Seikatsusen ABC)
- 1932: First Steps Ashore (上陸第一歩, Jōriku dai ippo)
- 1934: Our Neighbor, Miss Yae (隣の八重ちゃん, Tonari no Yae-chan)
- 1935: Okoto and Sasuke (春琴抄 お琴と佐助, Shunkinsho: Okoto to Sasuke)
- 1936: Family Meeting (家族会議, Kazoku kaigi)
- 1937: Three Crows' Engagement (婚約三羽烏, Kon'yaku sanbagarasu)
- 1937: The Lights of Asakusa (浅草の灯, Asakusa no hi)
- 1939: A Brother and His Younger Sister (兄とその妹, Ani to soto imōto)
- 1940: Totsugu hi made (嫁ぐ日まで)

== Bibliography ==
- Wada-Marciano, Mitsuyo (2008). Nippon Modern: Japanese Cinema of the 1920s and 1930s. University of Hawaii Press. ISBN 978-0-8248-3240-7.
