= List of Japanese films of the 1930s =

The following are lists of films produced in Japan in the 1930s:

- List of Japanese films of 1930
- List of Japanese films of 1931
- List of Japanese films of 1932
- List of Japanese films of 1933
- List of Japanese films of 1934
- List of Japanese films of 1935
- List of Japanese films of 1936
- List of Japanese films of 1937
- List of Japanese films of 1938
- List of Japanese films of 1939

== See also ==
- Category:Japanese films
