= List of Japanese films of 1933 =

A list of films produced in Japan in 1933 (see 1933 in film).

== Film releases ==
Opening	Title	Director	Cast	Genre	Notes	Ref
2 January	Tange Sazen - Dai-ippen	Daisuke Itō	Denjirō Ōkōchi, Katsutaro Bando, Kunitaro Sawamura	Jidaigeki		
2 February	The Dancing Girl of Izu	Heinosuke Gosho	Kinuyo Tanaka, Den Obinata, Tokuji Kobayashi	Drama, Romance		
14 January	The Bride Talks in Her Sleep	Heinosuke Gosho	Kinuyo Tanaka, Chōko Iida, Tatsuo Saitō, Tokuji Kobayashi	Comedy		
9 February	Woman of Tokyo	Yasujirō Ozu	Yoshiko Okada, Ureo Egawa, Kinuyo Tanaka, Shin'yō Nara, Chishū Ryū	Drama		
15 March	Island Girl	Hôtei Nomura	Yukichi Iwata, Ryoichi Takeuchi, Ureo Egawa	Drama		
1 April	Apart from You	Mikio Naruse	Mitsuko Yoshikawa, Akio Isono	Drama		
27 April	Dragnet Girl	Yasujirō Ozu	Kinuyo Tanaka	Crime		
27 April	Hotta Hayato	Daisuke Itō	Shinpachirō Asaka, Ryōsuke Kagawa, Chiezō Kataoka	Jidaigeki	Considered mostly lost	
4 May	Tipsy Life	Sotoji Kimura		Musical, Comedy		
11 May	A Woman Crying in Spring	Hiroshi Shimizu	Den Obinata, Akiko Chihaya, Yoshiko Okada	Drama		
1 June	Japanese Girls at the Harbor	Hiroshi Shimizu	Michiko Oikawa, Yukiko Inoue, Ureo Egawa	Romance, Drama		
1 June	The Water Magician	Kenji Mizoguchi	Takako Irie, Tokihiko Okada, Ichirō Sugai			
8 June	Every-Night Dreams	Mikio Naruse	Sumiko Kurishima, Teruko Kojima	Drama		
15 June	Gion Shigure	Minoru Inuzuka	Shirô Izome, Ranko Hanai, Eiji Takagi, Togo Yamamoto, Mantarō Ushio			
15 June	The Life of Bangaku	Sadao Yamanaka			Lost film	
13 July	Two Lanterns	Teinosuke Kinugasa		Jidaigeki		
10 August	Bored Hatamoto on a Rampage	Eiichi Koishi	Utaemon Ichikawa, Kokuten Kōdō, Ryuzo Takei, Jinichi Amano	Jidaigeki, Action		
17 August	The Layabout and Seabathing	Hiromasa Nomura	Akio Isono, Kōji Mitsui, Shozaburo Abe, Yukiko Inoue	Drama		
24 August	Musume juroku	Toshio Ōtani	Fujiko Fukamizu, Shintarô Takiguchi, Eiji Takagi			
31 August	The Feast of Gion	Kenji Mizoguchi	Shizuko Mori, Tokihiko Okada, Sumiko Suzuki, Ichirō Sugai	Romance	Considered lost	
7 September	Passing Fancy	Yasujirō Ozu	Takeshi Sakamoto		Winner of the Kinema Junpo Award for Best Film of the Year.	
21 September	A Man with a Married Woman’s Hairdo	Mikio Naruse	Mitsugu Fujii, Sumiko Mizukubo, Jun Arai, Akio Nomura	Drama	Considered lost	
5 October	Wasei Kingu Kongu	Torajirō Saitō	Yasuko Koizumi, Takeshi Sakamoto			
12 October	Genpei the Carp	Teinosuke Kinugasa	Kazuo Hasegawa, Toshiko Iizuka, Jushiro Kobayashi	Jidaigeki		
19 October	Happy Times	Hiromasa Nomura	Ureo Egawa, Hiroko Kawasaki, Tatsuo Saitō, Mitsugu Fujii	Drama		
31 October	The Boss’s Son at College	Hiroshi Shimizu	Mitsugu Fujii, Haruo Takeda, Yoshiko Tsubouchi			
9 November	Love	Heinosuke Gosho	Yoshiko Okada, Tadao Watanabe, Tokuji Kobayashi	Drama		
30 November	Police Officer	Tomu Uchida	Eiji Nakano, Isamu Kosugi, Taisuke Matsumoto	Crime, Drama		

== See also ==
- 1933 in Japan
