= List of Japanese films of 1930 =

A list of films produced in Japan in 1930 (see 1930 in film).

== Film releases ==
Opening	Title	Director	Cast	Genre	Notes	Ref
5 January	A Primer on Marriage	Yasujirō Ozu	Tatsuo Saitō, Sumiko Kurishima	Comedy	Considered lost	
26 January	Modern Cat Riot	Jôji Fukunishi		Horror	Considered lost	
6 February	What Made Her Do It?	Shigeyoshi Suzuki	Keiko Takatsu, Rintaro Fujima		Partially lost	
14 February	Pure Love	Mikio Naruse	Mitsuko Takao, Shoichi Kofujita, Takeda Hideo	Drama	Considered lost	
1 March	Walk Cheerfully	Yasujirō Ozu	Satoko Date, Hiroko Kawasaki	Drama		
7 March	Marching On	Kiyohiko Ushihara	Denmei Suzuki, Kinuyo Tanaka	War drama		
14 March	Yoshie Fujiwara’s Hometown	Kenji Mizoguchi	Yoshie Fujiwara, Shizue Natsukawa		Japan's second feature-length talkie (after Taii no Musume (The Captain's Daughter))	
11 April	I Flunked, But...	Yasujirō Ozu	Tatsuo Saitō, Kaoru Futaba, Kinuyo Tanaka, Tomio Aoki	Comedy		
26 April	Reijin	Yasujirō Shimazu	Sumiko Kurishima, Yukichi Iwata, Kaoru Futaba, Shin'yō Nara	Romance, Tendency film		
2 May	Hard Times	Mikio Naruse	Tomio Aoki, Hiroko Kawasaki, Tokuji Kobayashi, Tatsuo Saitō, Takeshi Sakamoto	Drama		
9 May	Behold This Mother	Tomotaka Tasaka		Drama		
9 May	Kiro ni tachite	Hiroshi Shimizu		Drama		
15 May	Ōoka Cases Devil’s Image - Part One	Daisuke Itō	Denjirō Ōkōchi	Jidaigeki		
29 May	Detective Umon’s Diary, Story No. 6	Kumahiko Nishina		Jidaigeki		
1 July	Tojin Okichi	Kenji Mizoguchi	Kaichi Yamamoto, Koji Shima	Drama	Considered mostly lost	
6 July	That Night's Wife	Yasujirō Ozu	Tokihiko Okada, Emiko Yagumo	Comedy		
15 July	Suronin Chuya	Daisuke Itō		Jidaigeki		
27 July	The Revengeful Spirit of Eros	Yasujirō Ozu	Tatsuo Saitō	Horror		
29 August	Love Is Strength	Mikio Naruse	Hiroko Kawasaki, Teruo Mori	Drama		
3 October	The Luck Which Touched the Leg	Yasujirō Ozu	Tatsuo Saitō, Mitsuko Yoshikawa, Tomio Aoki	Drama	Considered lost	
17 October	Senpū jidai	Seika Shiba	Kangyô Nakamura, Sumiko Suzuki, Minoru Kusama, Tsuruko Matsueda, Fumiko Yamaji, Tokumaro Dan, Kazue Mikasa			
10 November	Aiyoku no ki	Heinosuke Gosho	Kinuyo Tanaka, Ichiro Yuki	Jidaigeki		
15 November	Youth, Why Do You Cry?	Kiyohiko Ushihara	Hideo Fujino, Denmei Suzuki, Yukiko Tsukuba	Drama		
12 December	Young Lady	Yasujirō Ozu	Sumiko Kurishima, Tokihiko Okada, Tatsuo Saitō, Kinuyo Tanaka	Comedy		

== See also ==
- 1930 in Japan
