= List of Japanese films of 1932 =

A list of films produced in Japan in 1932 (see 1932 in film).

== Film releases ==
Opening	Title	Director	Cast	Genre	Notes	Ref
14 January	The Greatest Man in the World	Mansaku Itami	Shuichiro Atsumi, Junzaburō Ban, Chiezō Kataoka			
29 January	Spring Comes from the Ladies	Yasujirō Ozu	Jiro Shirota, Tatsuo Saitō, Yukiko Inoue			
4 February	Passion	Hiroshi Shimizu	Hideo Fujino, Kikuko Hanaoka, Shinichi Himori, Hideko Takamine			
11 February	Seven Seas: Chastity Chapter	Hiroshi Shimizu	Hiroko Kawasaki, Hideko Takamine, Kinuko Wakamizu	Drama		
14 April	First Steps Ashore	Yasujirō Shimazu	Ureo Egawa, Shin'ichi Himori, Chōko Iida			
19 May	Namiko	Eizo Tanaka	Yaeko Mizutani, Den Obinata, Yo Shiomi, Chitose Hayashi	Drama, Romance		
27 May	Moth-Eaten Spring	Mikio Naruse	Kinuko Wakamizu, Yumeko Aizome, Sumiko Mizukubo	Drama		
3 June	I Was Born, But...	Yasujirō Ozu	Tatsuo Saitō	Comedy drama		
17 June	Daughter and Springtime	Tomotaka Tasaka	Nobuko Fushimi, Etsuji Oki, Fudeko Tanaka	Drama		
29 July	Shin Yotsuya Ghost Story	Hôtei Nomura	Emiko Yagumo, Joji Oka, Yukiko Tsukuba, Kashichi Shimada, Chōko Iida	Drama, Horror		
26 August	Chocolate Girl	Mikio Naruse	Tomio Aoki, Jun Arai, Ryuko Fuji, Koji Kaga	Drama	Considered lost	
29 September	The Dawn of Manchuria and Mongolia	Kenji Mizoguchi	Takako Irie, Eiji Nakano, Taisuke Matsumoto			
13 October	Where Now Are the Dreams of Youth?	Yasujirō Ozu	Ureo Egawa, Kinuyo Tanaka, Tatsuo Saitō	Drama		
24 November	Until the Day We Meet Again	Yasujirō Ozu	Yoshiko Okada, Joji Oka, Shin'yō Nara			
1 December	Chūshingura	Teinosuke Kinugasa	Tomio Aoki, Juzaburo Bando, Kōtarō Bandō			
9 December	The Vindictive Snake	Jirô Yoshino	Tsuruko Takenoya, Seinosuke Toguchi, Nobuko Yanagimoto	Horror		
16 December	No Blood Relation	Mikio Naruse	Yoshiko Okada, Shin'yō Nara, Yukiko Tsukuba	Drama		
31 December	Kessen Kojinyama		Ryūnosuke Tsukigata, Kusuo Abe, Keiko Isuzu, Mineko Môri	Jidaigeki		
	Uzumaki	Hiroshi Innami	Shizuko Mori, Taisuke Matsumoto, Kenji Yuri			

== See also ==
- 1932 in Japan
