= List of Japanese films of 1931 =

A list of films produced in Japan in 1931 (see 1931 in film).

== Film releases ==
Opening	Title	Director	Cast	Genre	Notes	Ref
7 February	The Lady and the Beard	Yasujirō Ozu	Tokihiko Okada, Hiroko Kawasaki	Romantic comedy		
9 February	Nonsense Story, Vol.1: Monkey Island	Kenzō Masaoka		Animation		
14 February	Silver Stream	Hiroshi Shimizu	Emiko Yagumo, Minoru Takada, Tatsuo Saitō, Shin'yō Nara	Drama		
13 March	In Search of Mother	Hiroshi Inagaki		Jidaigeki		
5 May	Reimei izen	Teinosuke Kinugasa	Kazuo Hasegawa, Ryūnosuke Tsukigata, Akiko Chihaya	Jidaigeki		
29 May	The Sorrow of the Beautiful Woman	Yasujirō Ozu	Tokihiko Okada, Tatsuo Saitō, Shin'yō Nara	Drama		
12 June	And Yet They Go On	Kenji Mizoguchi	Yōko Umemura, Kumeko Urabe, Tomoemon Bando	Tendency film		
1 August	The Neighbor's Wife and Mine	Heinosuke Gosho	Atsushi Watanabe, Kinuyo Tanaka		Japan's first commercially successful talkie	
8 August	Flunky, Work Hard!	Mikio Naruse	Isamu Yamaguchi, Seiichi Kato, Tokio Seti	Comedy, Drama		
15 August	Tokyo Chorus	Yasujirō Ozu	Tokihiko Okada	Drama		
12 December	ABC Lifeline	Yasujirō Shimazu	Kinuyo Tanaka, Ureo Egawa, Hideo Fujino, Michiko Oikawa	Tendency film		
18 December	The Revenge Champion	Tomu Uchida	Isuzu Yamada	Comedy, Jidaigeki		
23 December	Seven Seas: Virginity Chapter	Hiroshi Shimizu	Drama, Romance			
31 December	Jirokichi the Rat	Daisuke Itō	Denjirō Ōkōchi, Minoru Takase, Naoe Fushimi	Action, Jidaigeki		

== See also ==
- 1931 in Japan
