= List of Japanese films of 1935 =

A list of films produced in Japan in 1935 (see 1935 in film).

== Film releases ==
Opening	Title	Director	Cast	Genre	Notes	Ref
20 January	Orizuru Osen	Kenji Mizoguchi	Isuzu Yamada			
1 March	Three Sisters with Maiden Hearts	Mikio Naruse	Chikako Hosokawa, Masako Tsutsumi, Ryuko Umezono	Drama		
7 March	The Scent of Pheasant’s Eye: An Episode from the Tales of Flowers	Jirô Kawate	Naomi Egawa, Mitsue Hisamatsu	Drama		
30 May	Oyuki the Virgin	Kenji Mizoguchi	Isuzu Yamada, Komako Hara, Daijiro Natsukawa, Eiji Nakano	Historical drama		
15 June	The Million Ryo Pot	Sadao Yamanaka	Denjiro Okochi	Comedy		
27 June	An Actor's Revenge	Teinosuke Kinugasa	Kazuo Hasegawa	Historical drama		
15 August	Wife! Be Like a Rose!	Mikio Naruse	Sachiko Chiba, Yuriko Hanabusa, Toshiko Itō			
31 October	Poppy	Kenji Mizoguchi		Drama		
1 November	The Village Tattooed Man	Sadao Yamanaka		Historical drama		
21 November	An Inn in Tokyo	Yasujirō Ozu	Takeshi Sakamoto, Yoshiko Okada			
10 December	Burden of Life	Heinosuke Gosho	Tatsuo Saitō, Mitsuko Yoshikawa, Masao Hayama, Yoshiko Tsubouchi, Kinuyo Tanaka, Mitsuyo Mizushima, Tokuji Kobayashi, Kenji Oyama, Shin Saburi, Jun Arai	Drama		
22 December	The Girl in the Rumor	Mikio Naruse	Sachiko Chiba, Kamatari Fujiwara	Drama		

== See also ==
- 1935 in Japan
