= List of Japanese films of 1937 =

A list of films produced in Japan in 1937 (see 1937 in film).

== Film releases ==
| Opening | Title | Director | Cast | Genre | Notes | Ref |
|---|---|---|---|---|---|---|
| 14 January | Song of the Flower Basket | Heinosuke Gosho | Kinuyo Tanaka, Shūji Sano, Shin Tokudaiji | Drama | | |
| 21 January | A Woman's Sorrows | Mikio Naruse | | Drama | | |
| 4 February | The Daughter of the Samurai | Mansaku Itami, Arnold Fanck | Setsuko Hara, Sesshu Hayakawa | Drama | Japanese/German production | |
| 11 February | Saga of the Vagabonds, Part One: Tiger and Wolf | Eisuke Takizawa | | Jidaigeki | | |
| 3 March | What Did the Lady Forget? | Yasujirō Ozu | Tatsuo Saitō, Sumiko Kurishima | Comedy drama | | |
| 1 May | A Star Athlete | Hiroshi Shimizu | | Comedy, Drama | | |
| 20 May | Don’t Tell Your Wife About It | Minoru Shibuya | | Comedy | | |
| 10 June | The Golden Demon | Hiroshi Shimizu | | Romance, Drama | | |
| 17 June | The Straits of Love and Hate | Kenji Mizoguchi | Fumiko Yamaji, Seizaburō Kawazu, Masao Shimizu | Drama | | |
| 1 July | Avalanche | Mikio Naruse | Noboru Kiritachi, Ranko Edogawa, Hideo Saeki | Drama | | |
| 1 July | Forget Love for Now | Hiroshi Shimizu | Michiko Kuwano, Tomio Aoki, Shūji Sano, Setsuko Shinobu | Drama | | |
| 11 July | Enoken’s Chikiri Kinta Part 1 – Momma, the Hat: The Nice Way | Kajirō Yamamoto | Ken'ichi Enomoto, Zeko Nakamura, Teiichi Futamura | Comedy | | |
| 18 July | The Trio’s Engagements | Yasujirō Shimazu | Shūji Sano, Ken Uehara, Shin Saburi, Mieko Takamine | Romantic comedy | | |
| 25 August | Humanity and Paper Balloons | Sadao Yamanaka | Chojuro Kawarazaki | Drama | | |
| 1 October | Learn from Experience, Part One | Mikio Naruse | Takako Irie | Drama | | |
| 8 October | Young People | Shirō Toyoda | | Drama | | |
| 3 November | Kagirinaki Zenshin | Tomu Uchida | Isamu Kosugi | | Winner of the Kinema Junpo Award for Best Film of the Year. | |
| 11 November | Children in the Wind | Hiroshi Shimizu | | Drama | | |
| 2 December | The Lights of Asakusa | Yasujirō Shimazu | Ken Uehara, Mieko Takamine, Daijirō Natsukawa | Drama | | |
| 18 December | Learn from Experience, Part Two | Mikio Naruse | Takako Irie | Drama | | |
| 31 December | Blood Spilled at Takadanobaba | Hiroshi Inagaki, Masahiro Makino | Tsumasaburō Bandō, Takashi Shimura, Tokumaro Dan | Jidaigeki | | |

== See also ==
- 1937 in Japan
