= List of Japanese films of 1934 =

A list of films produced in Japan in 1934 (see 1934 in film).

== Film releases ==
Opening	Title	Director	Cast	Genre	Notes	Ref
5 January	Tadano Bonji: Jinsei Benkyô	Sotoji Kimura		Comedy		
22 February	The Genealogy of Women	Hôtei Nomura		Drama		
1 March	The Elegant Swordsman	Sadao Yamanaka		Jidaigeki		
29 March	Tsuki yori no shisha	Tomotaka Tasaka		Romance		
26 April	Street Without End	Mikio Naruse	Setsuko Shinobu, Akio Isono	Drama		
3 May	Romantic and Crazy	Kajirō Yamamoto	Ken'ichi Enomoto, Masako Tsutsumi, Sachiko Chiba	Comedy, Musical		
10 May	The Foghorn	Minoru Murata	Eiji Nakano, Ichiro Sugai, Shiga Akiko, Kōju Murata, Nobuo Kosaka	Drama		
11 May	A Mother Should Be Loved	Yasujirō Ozu	Den Ohinata, Hideo Mitsui	Drama		
17 May	Chūshingura: Ninjō-hen, Fukushū-hen	Daisuke Itō		Jidaigeki		
17 May	Sun over the River	Tomu Uchida		Drama		
28 June	Our Neighbor, Miss Yae	Yasujirō Shimazu		Drama		
14 July	With a Single Sword Bale	Teinosuke Kinugasa		Jidaigeki		
1 September	Aizō Tōge	Kenji Mizoguchi	Isuzu Yamada, Denmei Suzuki, Komako Hara			
14 September	The Great Buddha Arrival	Yoshirō Edamasa	Hidemichi Ishikawa, Kazuyo Kojima, Tankai Soganoya	Fantasy		
14 September	Osayo koisugata	Yasujirō Shimazu				
4 October	Diary of a Bride	Kunio Watanabe		Drama, Romance		
25 October	Enoken’s The Magician	Sotoji Kimura		Comedy		
1 November	Eclipse	Hiroshi Shimizu	Mitsugu Fujii, Hiroko Kawasaki, Michiko Kuwano	Drama		
1 November	Mito Kômon: Rai Kunitsugu no maki	Ryohei Arai		Drama		
22 November	Karisome no kuchibeni	Shigeyoshi Suzuki		Musical, Romance		
23 November	A Story of Floating Weeds	Yasujirō Ozu	Takeshi Sakamoto	Drama		
13 December	My Elder Brother	Yasujirō Shimazu		Drama		

== See also ==
- 1934 in Japan
