= Days of Youth =

1929 film

- Directed by: Yasujirō Ozu
- Written by: Akira Fushimi; Yasujirō Ozu
- Starring: Ichirō Yūki; Tatsuo Saitō; Junko Matsui
- Cinematography: Hideo Shigehara
- Distributed by: Shochiku
- Release date: 13 April 1929
- Running time: 103 minutes
- Country: Japan
- Languages: Silent film Japanese intertitles

Days of Youth (1929)

Days of Youth (学生(がくせい)ロマンス 若(わか)き日(ひ), Gakusei Romance: Wakaki hi) is a Japanese silent comedy film directed by Yasujirō Ozu. It is the oldest known surviving film by the director. The film tells of two friends from a university (played by Ichirō Yūki and Tatsuo Saitō) who vie for the attention of the same girl (Junko Matsui) during a skiing trip.

== Cast ==
- Ichirō Yūki as Bin Watanabe (a student)
- Tatsuo Saitō as Shūichi Yamamoto (a student)
- Junko Matsui as Chieko
- Chōko Iida as Chieko's mother
- Eiko Takamatsu as Landlady
- Shōichi Kofujita as Shōji (her son)
- Ichirō Ōkuni as Professor Anayama
- Takeshi Sakamoto as Professor
- Shin'ichi Himori as Hatamoto (a student)
- Fusao Yamada as Kobayashi (a student)
- Chishū Ryū as Student

== Reception ==
The British Film Institute listed Days of Youth as the best Japanese film of 1929, describing it as "an outstandingly creative intersection of various styles and genres" which echoed "Ernst Lubitsch's sophisticated comedy and Harold Lloyd's ludic humour".
