= Kyōen Kobanzame =

- Japanese movie poster
- Directed by: Nobuo Nakagawa
- Written by: Yoshihiro Ishikawa; Jiro Fujishima
- Produced by: Mitsuhiko Ōkura
- Starring: Kanjūrō Arashi; Misako Uji; Ryūzaburō Nakamura; Ureo Egawa; Tomohiko Ōtani
- Cinematography: Tadashi Nishimoto
- Edited by: Shin Nagata
- Music by: Chikara Hashimoto
- Production company: Shintoho
- Release dates: 8 November 1958 (Part 1); 15 November 1958 (Part 2)
- Running time: 70 minutes (Part 1); 73 minutes (Part 2)
- Country: Japan
- Language: Japanese

Kyōen Kobanzame (Japanese: 侠艶小判鮫) is a 1958 black-and-white Japanese film directed by Nobuo Nakagawa.

There are two parts of the film: the first part Kyōen Kobanzame: Zenpen (侠艶小判鮫 前篇) and the second part Kyōen Kobanzame: Kōhen (侠艶小判鮫 後篇). Both parts have the same cast and crew.

== Cast ==
- Kanjūrō Arashi (嵐寛寿郎)
- Misako Uji (宇治 みさ子)
- Ryūzaburō Nakamura (中村竜三郎) - Dual role
- Ureo Egawa (江川 宇礼雄)
- Tomohiko Ōtani (大谷友彦)
- Saburō Sawai (沢井三郎)
- Tetsurō Tamba (丹波哲郎)
- Masao Takamatsu (高松政雄)
- Kōtarō Bandō (坂東好太郎)
- Fumiko Miyata (宮田文子)
- Namiji Matsuura (松浦浪路)
