= Junko Matsui =

Japanese actress (1906-1989)

- 松井潤子
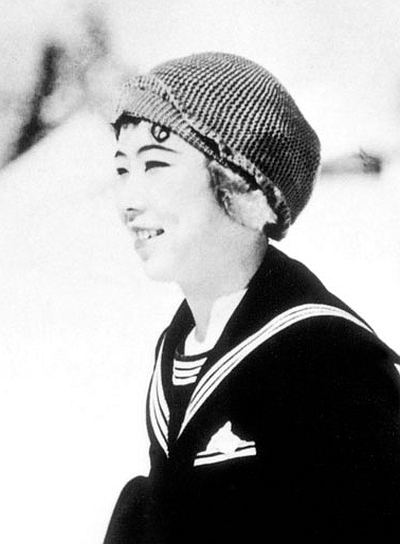
- Junko Matsui, from Days of Youth (1929)
- Born: 蔵数潤子; 7 December 1906; Asakusa, Tokyo
- Died: 1 August 1989 (aged 82)
- Other name: Kiyomi Matsui (stage name)
- Occupation: Actress
- Spouse: Shigeru Mizuhara (m. 1935)
- Relatives: Chieko Matsui (sister)

Junko Matsui (7 December 1906 – 1 August 1989) (松井潤子 in Japanese, or まつい じゅんこ in kana) was a Japanese actress in silent and sound films in the 1920s and 1930s.

== Early life ==
Junko Matsui was born in Asakusa, Tokyo; her older sister Chieko Matsui was also an actress. She attended Daiichi Girls' High School.

== Career ==
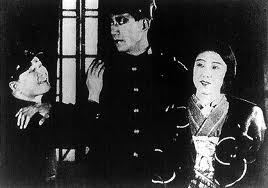
A scene from Wakôdo no yume (The Dreams of Youth, 1928), a romantic comedy by Yasujirõ Ozu, featuring Junko Matsui

Matsui started on stage as a young woman, beginning when she substituted for her sister in a show. On stage she was known as Kiyomi Matsui. She joined the Shochiku Komata film studio with her sister. She appeared in dozens of silent and sound films in the 1920s and 1930s.

Matsui was most often cast as modern young women in silent comedies and melodramas, most notably in Days of Youth (1929), directed by Yasujirō Ozu, in which two college men are rivals for her character's attentions while they all enjoy a ski holiday at Akakura. She had supporting roles in the melodramas Haha o kowazuya (A Mother Should Be Loved, 1934), also directed by Yasujirō Ozu, and in Kazoku Kaigi (Family Meeting, 1936), directed by Yasujirō Shimazu.

Matsui retired from the screen in 1940, but appeared in one film after World War II, Natsukashi no buruusu (The Nostalgia Blues, 1948).

== Personal life ==
Matsui married professional baseball player and team manager Shigeru Mizuhara in 1935. He died in 1982, and she died in 1989, at the age of 82.
