= Ornamental Hairpin =

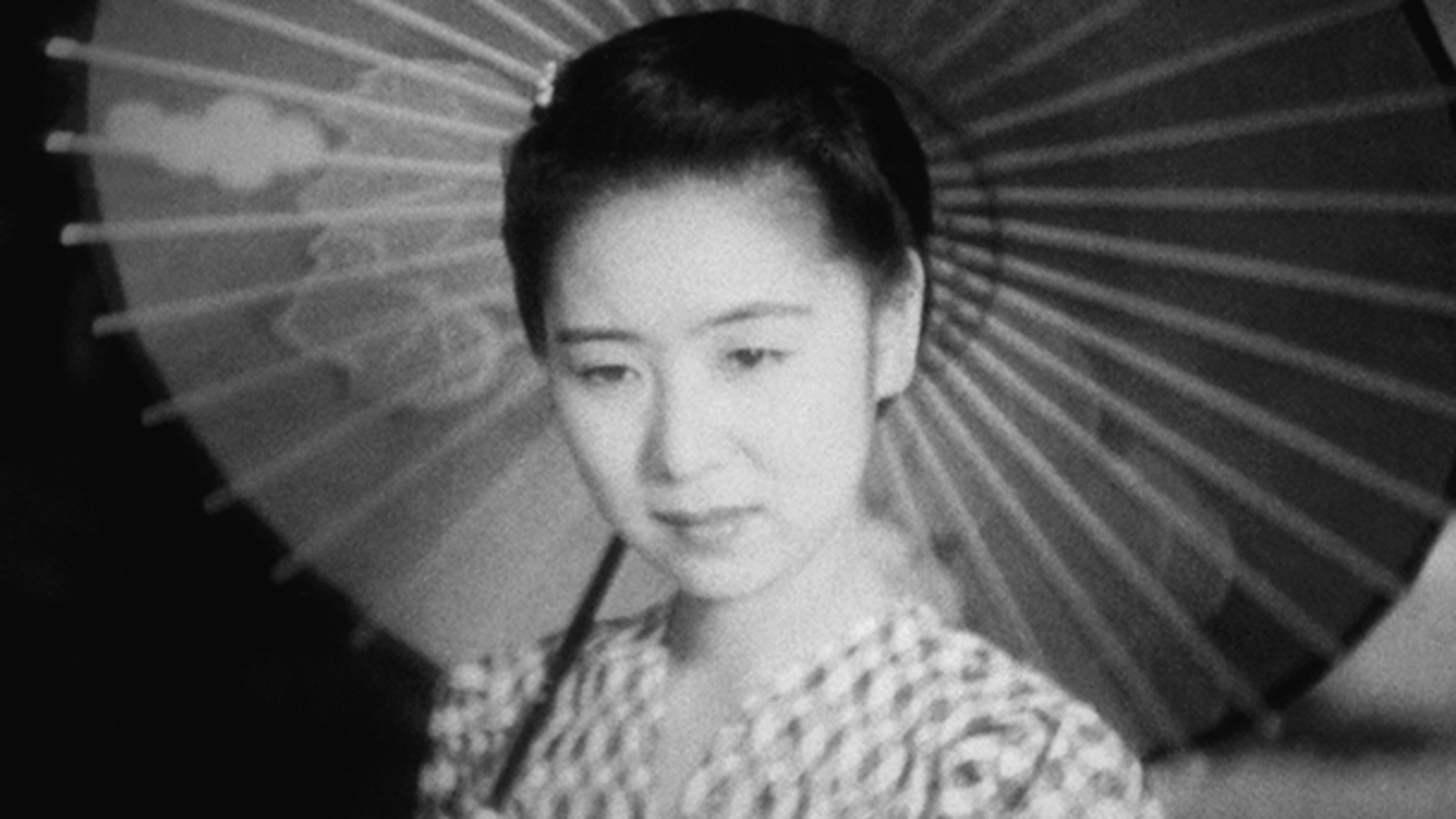
- Kinuyo Tanaka in Ornamental Hairpin
- 簪 (Kanzashi)
- Directed by: Hiroshi Shimizu
- Written by: Hiroshi Shimizu; Masuji Ibuse (short story)
- Produced by: Yasuyuki Arai
- Starring: Kinuyo Tanaka; Chishū Ryū; Tatsuo Saitō
- Cinematography: Suketarū Inokai
- Edited by: Yoshiyasu Hamamura
- Music by: Takaaki Asai
- Production company: Shochiku
- Distributed by: Shochiku
- Release date: August 26, 1941
- Running time: 75 minutes
- Country: Japan
- Language: Japanese

Ornamental Hairpin (1941) by Hiroshi Shimizu

Ornamental Hairpin (簪, Kanzashi) is a 1941 Japanese comedy-drama film written and directed by Hiroshi Shimizu. It is based on the short story Yottsu no yubune (四つの湯槽, lit. "The four bathtubs") by Masuji Ibuse.

== Plot ==
A diverse group of people is staying at a remote spa, including grumpy professor Katada, who regularly scolds young husband Hiroyasu for not being strict enough with his wife, an old man with his two grandsons Taro and Jiro, and soldier Nanmura. When Nanmura steps on a kanzashi, a woman's ornamental hairpin, in an outdoor bath, he has to extend his stay. After the owner of the hairpin, Emi, a former resident, is located, she returns to the spa to apologise. Together with Taro and Jiro, she supports Nanmura with his daily exercises to regain his health. Although Emi and Nanmura share an unspoken mutual affection, they both know that their time together is finite: Nanmura will have to return to the military service, while Emi, a geisha who has fled her patron, faces an uncertain future.

== Cast ==
- Kinuyo Tanaka as Emi
- Chishū Ryū as Takeshi Nanmura
- Tatsuo Saitō as Professor Katada
- Shin'ichi Himori as Hiroyasu
- Hideko Mimura as Hiroyasu's wife
- Kanji Kawahara as the old man
- Jun Yokoyama as Taro, grandson of the old man
- Masayoshi Ōtsuka as Jiro, grandson of the old man
- Hiroko Kawasaki as Okiku, Emi's geisha friend
- Takeshi Sakamoto as spa owner
- Kōji Matsumoto as staff manager
- Munenobu Yui as Toku, a masseur
- Tsuneo Ōsugi as Tsune, a masseur
- Kayoko Terada as maid

== Reception ==
Upon its initial release (at the height of the Sino-Japanese War and shortly before Japan entered World War II), critic Akira Shimizu attacked Ornamental Hairpin as a "la-di-da" film in times when film stock was precious.

== Legacy ==
Film scholar Alexander Jacoby describes Ornamental Hairpin as one of Shimizu's "richest and most complex achievements" which "boasted outstanding performances from Kinuyo Tanaka and Chishū Ryū". The British Film Institute included the film in its list of the best Japanese films since 1925.

Ornamental Hairpin was screened at the Berlin International Film Festival's "Forum" section in 2004 and at the Cinémathèque française in 2020 and 2021.
