= Rikon =

- Japanese movie poster
- Directed by: Masahiro Makino
- Written by: Hideo Oguni
- Starring: Ureo Egawa; Yuriko Hanabusa; Chōko Iida; Michiyo Kogure; Noriko Munakata
- Cinematography: Shin Yamanaka
- Music by: Shōichi Suzuki
- Production company: Tokyo Pro (Japan)
- Distributed by: Shintoho Film Distribution Committee
- Release date: May 29, 1952 (Japan)
- Running time: 100 minutes
- Country: Japan
- Language: Japanese

Rikon (Japanese: 離婚), also known as Divorce, is a 1952 black-and-white Japanese film directed by Masahiro Makino.

== Cast ==
- Ureo Egawa as Shōgo Yamamura
- Yuriko Hanabusa as Natsuno Sōma
- Chōko Iida as Kikuyo
- Michiyo Kogure as Michiko Sōma
- Noriko Munakata as Tsuruko Miyawakita
- Shin Saburi as Daisuke Sakuma
- Tatsuo Saitō as Hanzō Sakai
- Haruko Shima as Sadako Kitazawa
- Kyōji Sugi as Masanao Sōma
- Haruo Tanaka as Fumio Sōma
- Jun Tazaki as Kensaku - Tazaki
- Misako Yoshimura as Toshiko Yamamura
