= What Did the Lady Forget? =

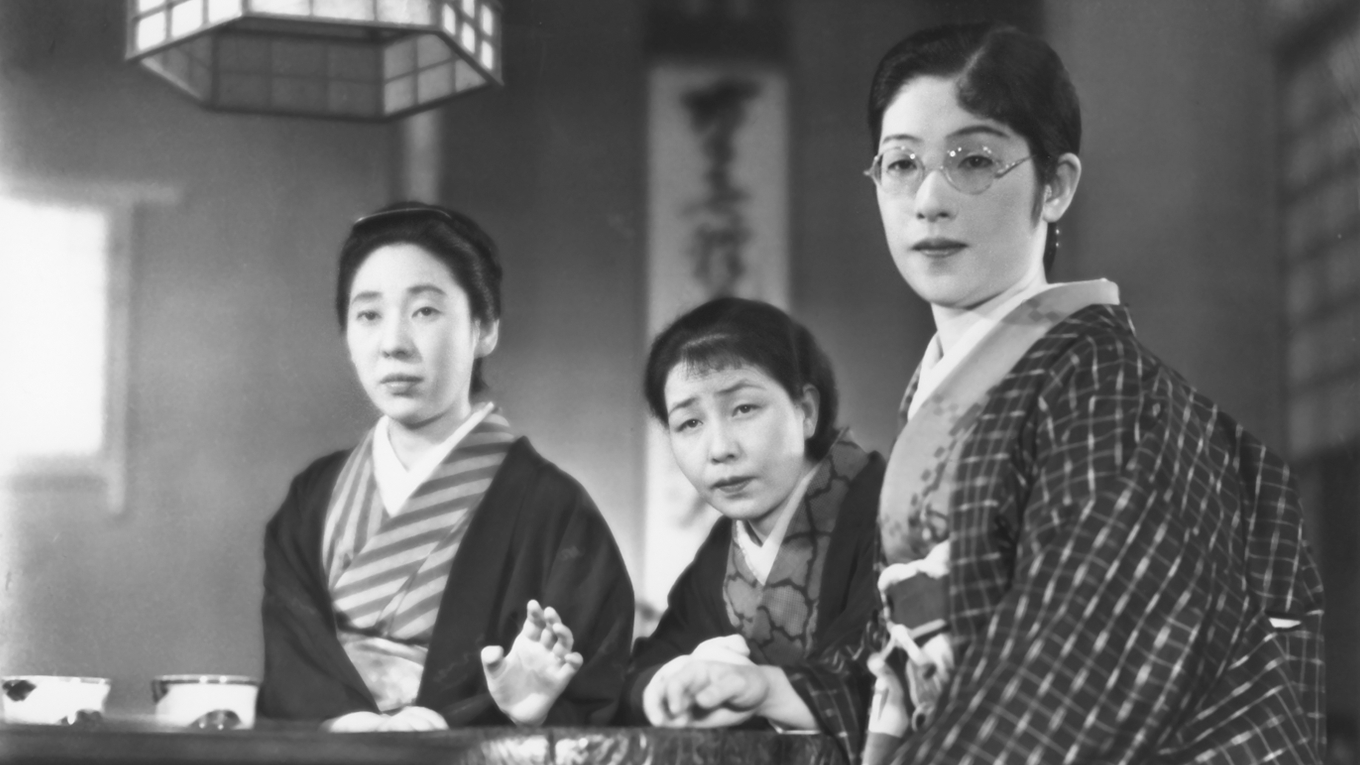
- From left to right: Mitsuko Yoshikawa, Chōko Iida and Sumiko Kurishima
- Directed by: Yasujirō Ozu
- Written by: Akira Fushimi; Yasujirō Ozu (as James Maki)
- Starring: Tatsuo Saitō; Sumiko Kurishima; Michiko Kuwano
- Cinematography: Yūharu Atsuta; Hideo Shigehara
- Edited by: Kenkichi Hara
- Music by: Senji Itō
- Production company: Shochiku
- Distributed by: Shochiku
- Release date: March 3, 1937
- Running time: 75 minutes
- Country: Japan
- Language: Japanese

What Did the Lady Forget? (淑女は何を忘れたか, Shukujo wa nani wo wasureta ka) is a 1937 Japanese comedy-drama film directed by Yasujirō Ozu. In 2009 the film was ranked at No. 59 on the list of the Greatest Japanese Films of All Time by Japanese film magazine Kinema Junpo.

== Plot ==
Komiya is a good-natured professor of medicine at a Tokyo university, who lives in a childless marriage with his strict wife Tokiko. When his niece from Osaka, Setsuko, comes for a visit, Tokiko criticises her liberated manners, including her smoking in public, which annoys Setsuko.

Tokiko tells her husband to go for his usual weekend golfing trip to Izu, though Komiya is not keen. So as not to upset his insistent wife, Komiya leaves anyway, but leaves his golf equipment with his student Okada, and writes a postcard telling Tokiko that he's having a nice trip and the weather is fine. Setsuko follows her uncle to a Ginza bar, and insists on Komiya taking her to visit a geisha house, where she gets drunk. Komiya asks Okada to take Setsuko back to his home, where Tokiko is displeased about her niece's behaviour. He stays overnight at Okada's place, worried about the rainy weather which would have made the golfing trip, which he wrote about in his postcard, impossible.

When Komiya returns home, Tokiko demands that he lecture Setsuko. While he pretends to do so, he secretly asks Setsuko to intercept the postcard with the false message. Unfortunately Setsuko fails, and Tokiko reads the card and discovers Komiya's untruthfulness. She loses her temper before the two, who leave to prevent any more friction. At the Ginza bar, Setsuko lectures her uncle for being henpecked and asks him to stand up to his wife. Upon their return, Tokiko asks her niece to leave and scolds Komiya for spoiling her. Unable to hold back any longer, Komiya slaps his wife. Setsuko secretly compliments her uncle for his demeanour, and then goes to Tokiko and apologises for causing trouble. Komiya too goes to Tokiko to apologise. When he goes back to his room, Setsuko scolds him for his inconsequence, to which he replies that it's best to "take the opposite approach", like scolding a child while praising on the surface, or in his case apologizing to his wife.

When Tokiko meets with her friends Chiyoko and Mitsuko again, she talks about the incident as if she were enlightened by her husband's "manliness". Setsuko meets with Okada before leaving for Osaka, joking about how they would treat each other if they were married, and announcing her return for the university baseball game. In the evening, Komiya and Tokiko agree how empty the house is with Setsuko gone, sharing a cigarette. Tokiko abruptly rises tells the maid (offstage) to go to bed. Then she suggests to her husband they load up on coffee, promising him he will still sleep well. In the final scene, Komiya is seen pacing in the dark when Tokiko appears with a tray of coffee and the couple exit together stage left.

== Cast ==
- Sumiko Kurishima - Tokiko
- Tatsuo Saitō - Komiya
- Michiko Kuwano - Setsuko
- Shūji Sano - Okada
- Takeshi Sakamoto - Sugiyama
- Chōko Iida - Chiyoko, Sugiyama's wife
- Ken Uehara - Himself
- Mitsuko Yoshikawa - Mitsuko
- Masao Hayama - Fujio, Mitsuko's son
- Tomio Aoki - Tomio
- Mitsuko Higashiyama - Geisha

== Popular culture ==
In one scene, Setsuko reads an edition of French cinema journal Pour Vous, prominently featuring a photograph of filmstar Marlene Dietrich.

== Home media ==
In 2010, the BFI released a Region 2 DVD of the film as a bonus feature on its Dual Format Edition (Blu-ray + DVD) of Early Summer.

The Criterion Collection's Blu-ray and DVD release of The Flavor of Green Tea over Rice in 2019 included the film as an extra.
