= That Night's Wife =

1930 film

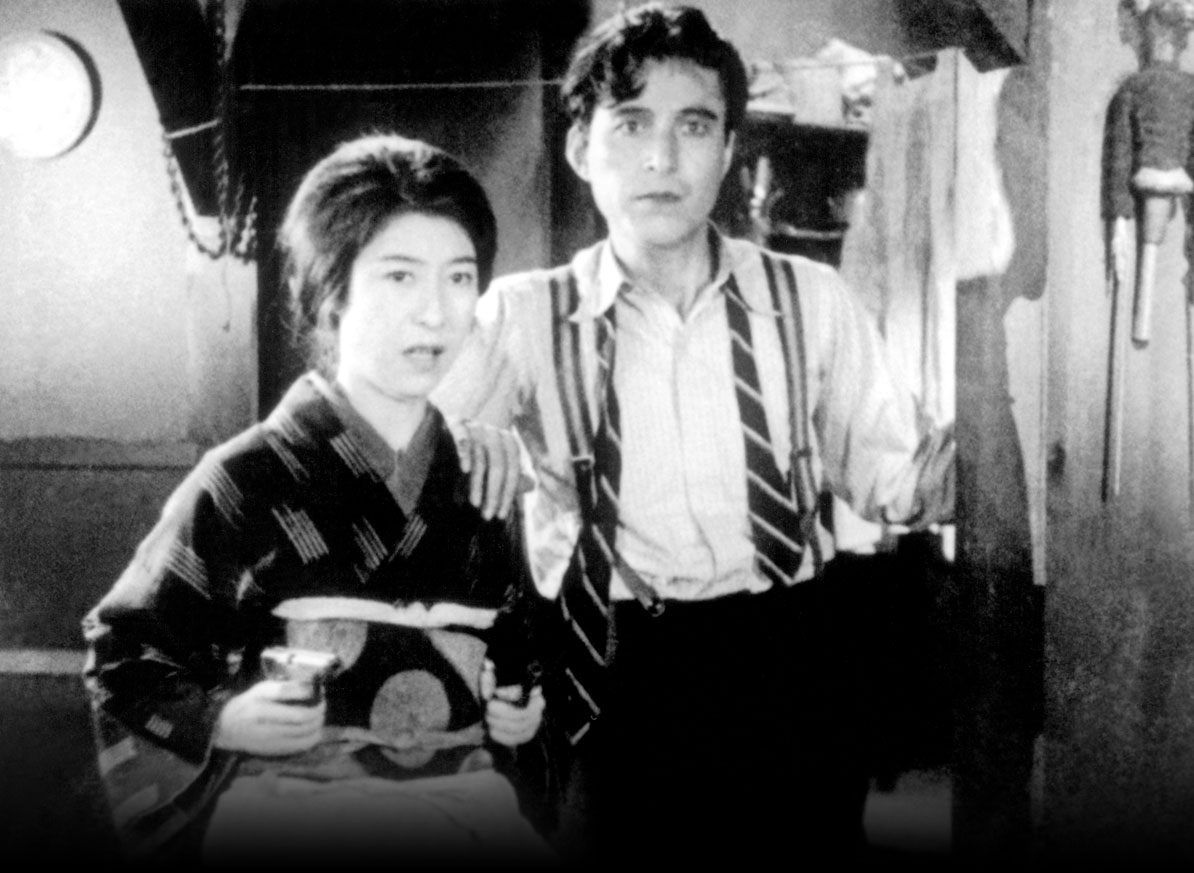
- Directed by: Yasujirō Ozu
- Written by: Kōgo Noda
- Starring: Mitsuko Ichimura; Tokihiko Okada; Chishū Ryū; Tatsuo Saitō; Emiko Yagumo; Tōgō Yamamoto
- Cinematography: Hideo Shigehara
- Distributed by: Shochiku
- Release date: 6 July 1930
- Running time: 65 minutes
- Country: Japan
- Language: Japanese

That Night's Wife (その夜の妻, Sono Yo no Tsuma) is a 1930 Japanese crime and drama film directed by Yasujirō Ozu. The film stars Tokihiko Okada, Tatsuo Saitō, Chishū Ryū, Emiko Yagumo and Tōgō Yamamoto in the lead roles.

== Plot ==
That Night's Wife (1930)

A man, Shuji Hashizume, robs a bank at gunpoint, leaving a bloody handprint behind as he flees from the police. Elsewhere, a doctor tends to a young girl named Michiko. The doctor tells the girl's mother, Mayumi, that Michiko might not make it through the night; if she does, however, she will be past the worst of her illness. The child awakens and asks for her father, but Mayumi tells her that he has gone out to find money for medicine.

Shuji narrowly escapes capture from the police and calls a doctor from a phone booth. It emerges that Shuji is Michiko's father, with the doctor informing him that Michiko is in critical condition and he should return home immediately. Shuji takes a taxi home and reunites with his wife and daughter, handing over the money he stole. When Mayumi deduces that he stole it, Shuji states that given how poor the family is, he had no choice, and tells her that when Michiko has recovered he will turn himself into the police.

A detective, Kagawa, arrives and forcibly enters the apartment as Shuji hides. Despite Mayumi's protests that he is scaring her daughter, Kagawa reveals that he was driving the taxi that Shuji took home in order to track him down. As Kagawa is about to find Shuji, Mayumi takes Shuji's gun and disarms Kagawa. Shuji refuses to escape, not wanting to leave Michiko, and Mayumi states that the four must stay in the apartment until Michiko has recovered, at which point the detective can take Shuji to the police.

During the night while keeping watch on Kagawa, Mayumi falls asleep. When she awakes she finds that Kagawa has taken the guns from her; however, he simply tells her to get some rest until the doctor can arrive in the morning. The doctor eventually arrives and confirms that Michiko is past her critical phase and will be better soon. After he leaves Mayumi notices that Kagawa has fallen asleep, and she helps Shuji escape from the apartment.

Returning to the apartment, she finds Kagawa has woken up. When he goes to leave, the pair find Shuji waiting outside, having decided to turn himself in. He says his goodbyes to Michiko, who is still asleep, and Mayumi, before he and Kagawa depart. Michiko awakes just as they are leaving, and Kagawa and Shuji share a cigarette outside as Michiko and Mayumi wave goodbye to them from their apartment window as the pair walk to the police station.

== Cast ==
- Mitsuko Ichimura as Michiko, daughter
- Tokihiko Okada as Shuji Hashizume, husband
- Chishū Ryū as Policeman
- Tatsuo Saitō as Suda, doctor
- Emiko Yagumo as Mayumi, wife
- Tōgō Yamamoto as Detective Kagawa
