= List of Japanese films of 1936 =

A list of films produced in Japan in 1936 (see 1936 in film).

== Film releases ==
Opening	Title	Director	Cast	Genre	Notes	Ref
13 February	Theater of Life: Youth Version	Tomu Uchida		Drama		
27 February	Mr. Thank You	Hiroshi Shimizu	Ken Uehara, Michiko Kuwano, Mayumi Tsukiji, Kaoru Futaba	Comedy, drama, road movie		
19 March	College is a Nice Place	Yasujirō Ozu		Comedy		
3 April	Family Meeting	Yasujirō Shimazu	Shin Saburi	Drama		
14 April	I Am a Cat	Kajirō Yamamoto		Comedy		
14 April	Great Bodhisattva Pass 2	Hiroshi Inagaki		Drama		
30 April	Priest of Darkness	Sadao Yamanaka	Setsuko Hara	Historical drama		
14 May	Woman in the Mist	Heinosuke Gosho		Drama		
28 May	Osaka Elegy	Kenji Mizoguchi	Isuzu Yamada, Yoko Umemura	Drama		
1 June	Man of the House	Mikio Naruse		Drama		
18 June	Akanishi Kakita	Mansaku Itami		Historical drama		
21 June	Brother and Sister	Sotoji Kimura		Drama		
29 August	Men vs. Women	Yasujirō Shimazu		Comedy, Musical		
11 September	The Road I Travel with You	Mikio Naruse		Drama		
15 September	The Only Son	Yasujirō Ozu	Chishū Ryū	Drama		
15 October	Sisters of the Gion	Kenji Mizoguchi	Isuzu Yamada	Drama	Winner of the Kinema Junpo Award for Best Film of the Year.	
1 November	Morning's Tree-Lined Street	Mikio Naruse	Sachiko Chiba, Heihachirō Ōkawa, Ranko Akagi	Drama		
30 November	The New Road: Akemi	Heinosuke Gosho		Drama		
16 December	The New Road: Ryota	Heinosuke Gosho		Drama		

== See also ==
- 1936 in Japan
