= Yukiko Inoue =

Japanese actress (1915–2012)

Yukiko Inoue 井上雪子
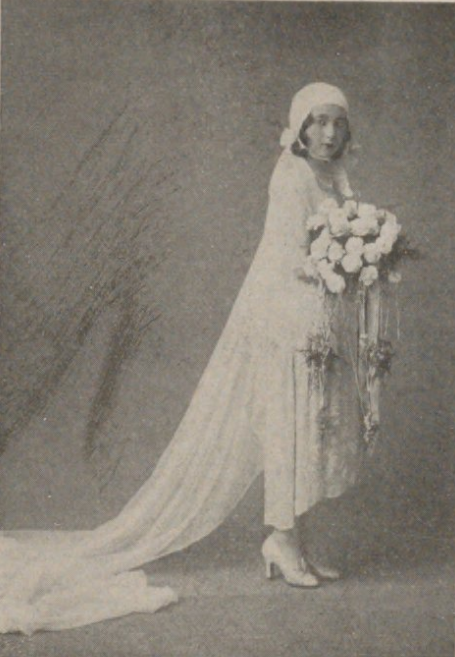
- Yukiko Inoue in 1933
- Born: June 5, 1915; Kobe, Hyōgo Prefecture, Empire of Japan
- Died: November 29, 2012 (aged 97)
- Occupation: Actress
- Years active: 1929-1936, 2004
- Spouse: Tatsuo Saitō (divorced)

Yukiko Miyamoto (宮本 雪子, Miyamoto Yukiko, June 5, 1915 – November 19, 2012), known professionally as Yukiko Inoue (井上 雪子), was a Japanese actress. During her time in Osaka Shochiku Gakugeki (present-day OSK Nippon Revue), she was also known as Kazuko Kane (鐘 一子).

== Life ==
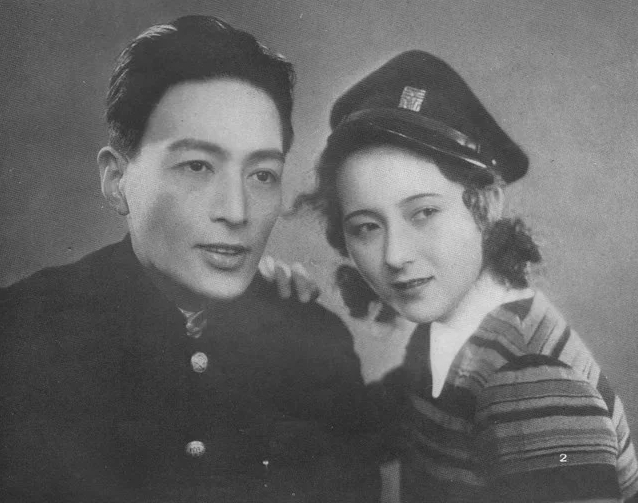
Yukiko Inoue and Jirō Shirota in Spring Comes from the Ladies (1932)

Yukiko Miyamoto was born on June 5, 1915, in Kobe, Hyōgo Prefecture, to a Dutch father and a Japanese mother.

In 1927, she graduated from Shimoyamate Elementary School in Kobe and entered Canadian School.

In April 1929, she joined the Osaka Shochiku Gakugeki (present- day OSK Nippon Revue) and appeared on stage under the stage name Kazuko Kane.

In November 1930, Inoue was scouted by Denmei Suzuki and joined Shochiku. The next year, she was cast in the lead role in Yasujirō Ozu's film Bijin Aishū and in Spring Comes from the Ladies, both released in 1932, but none of these films have survived.

She also appeared in comedies directed by Torajirō Saitō. However, she left Shochiku after appearing in Mikio Naruse's Street Without End, released in 1934.

Inoue made a special appearance alongside Shinichi Akita in Shirō Toyoda's Tokyo - Osaka Tokudane Ōrai released in 1936. However, Inoue abruptly announced that she would "never appear in movies in the future" and retired from the movie world. After her retirement, she married actor Tatsuo Saitō, but they later divorced.

In 1995, she was listed as "whereabouts unknown" in Nihon Eiga Jinmei Jiten: Joyū-hen, Volume 1 by Kinema Junposha. However, in 2003, she took the stage at OZU 2003, a symposium commemorating the 100th anniversary of the birth of Yasujirō Ozu.

In 2004, she made her first film appearance in 68 years in Akihiko Shiota's Kanaria which was screened at the 5th Tokyo Filmex, which became a topic of conversation.

On November 19, 2012, she died from natural causes at the age of 97.

== Filmography ==
- Moyuru Hanabira (1931)
- Bijin Aishū (1931)
- Ai yo jinrui to tomoni are (1931)
- The Neighbor's Wife and Mine (1931)
- Naniga kanojo wo hadaka ni sitaka (1931)
- Seishun Zue (1931)
- Reijō to Yotamono (1932)
- Spring Comes from the Ladies (1932)
- Sanjūninengata Renai Bushidō (1932)
- Manshū Kōshinkyoku (1932)
- Byakuya ha Akuru (1932)
- Josei no Kirifuda (1932)
- Nanban Nadeshiko (1933)
- Japanese Girls at the Harbor (1933)
- Yotamono to Kaisuiyoku (1933)
- Genkanban to Ojōsan (1934)
- Tōyō no Haha (1934)
- Daigaku no Wakadanna・Buyūden (1934)
- Street Without End (1934)
- Tokyo - Osaka Tokudane Ōrai(1936)
- Kanaria (2004)
