= Japanese Girls at the Harbor (film) =

1933 film

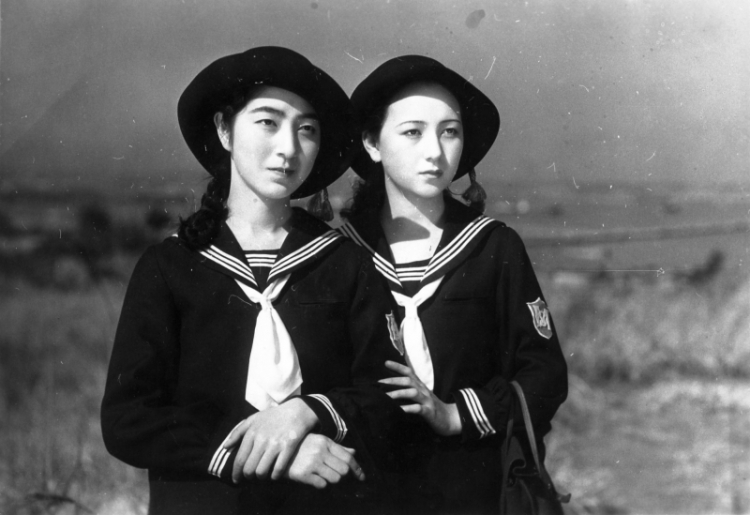
- Michiko Oikawa and Yukiko Inoue in Japanese Girls at the Harbor

Japanese name
- Kanji: 港の日本娘
- Directed by: Hiroshi Shimizu
- Written by: Mitsu Suyama; Toma Kitabayashi (novel)
- Produced by: Takeshi Sato
- Starring: Michiko Oikawa; Yukiko Inoue; Ureo Egawa; Ranko Sawa; Yumeko Aizome
- Cinematography: Tarō Sasaki
- Production company: Shochiku
- Distributed by: Shochiku
- Release date: 1 June 1933
- Running time: 72 minutes
- Country: Japan
- Language: Japanese

Japanese Girls at the Harbor (1933) by Hiroshi Shimizu

Japanese Girls at the Harbor (港の日本娘, Minato no nihon musume) is a 1933 Japanese silent drama film directed by Hiroshi Shimizu. It is based on the novel of the same name by Toma Kitabayashi. Film historians have called Japanese Girls at the Harbor an "electrifying masterpiece of Japanese silent cinema", and "visually flamboyant and emotionally intense".

== Plot ==
The friendship of Sunako and Dora, both mixed-race teenagers attending a Catholic school in Yokohama, is at stake with the appearance of careless playboy Henry. After a short-lived affair, Henry leaves Sunako for a third girl, Yoko. In an outburst of jealousy, Sunako shoots Yoko with Henry's revolver in a church's prayer room.

A few years later, Sunako, whom according to the intertitles "God hasn't forgiven", lives with unsuccessful painter Miura and works as a prostitute in a bar, while Henry and Dora are married and expecting a child. When Sunako is re-united with Henry and Dora, new tensions arise, while Miura is acquainted with a young woman from the neighbourhood who turns out to be Yoko, who survived the shooting. Sunako decides not to interfere with Dora's marriage and convinces Henry to stay with his wife and become a responsible father. After Yoko dies of illness, Sunako and Miura decide to start anew elsewhere and leave Yokohama by ship.

== Cast ==
- Michiko Oikawa as Sunako Kurokawa
- Yukiko Inoue as Dora Kennel
- Ureo Egawa as Henry
- Ranko Sawa as Yōko Sheridan
- Yumeko Aizome as Masumi
- Tatsuo Saitō as Miura, the painter
- Yasuo Nanjō as Harada

== Bibliography ==
- Richie, Donald (2005). A Hundred Years of Japanese Film (Revised ed.). Tokyo, New York, London: Kodansha International. ISBN 978-4-7700-2995-9.
