= A Story of Floating Weeds =

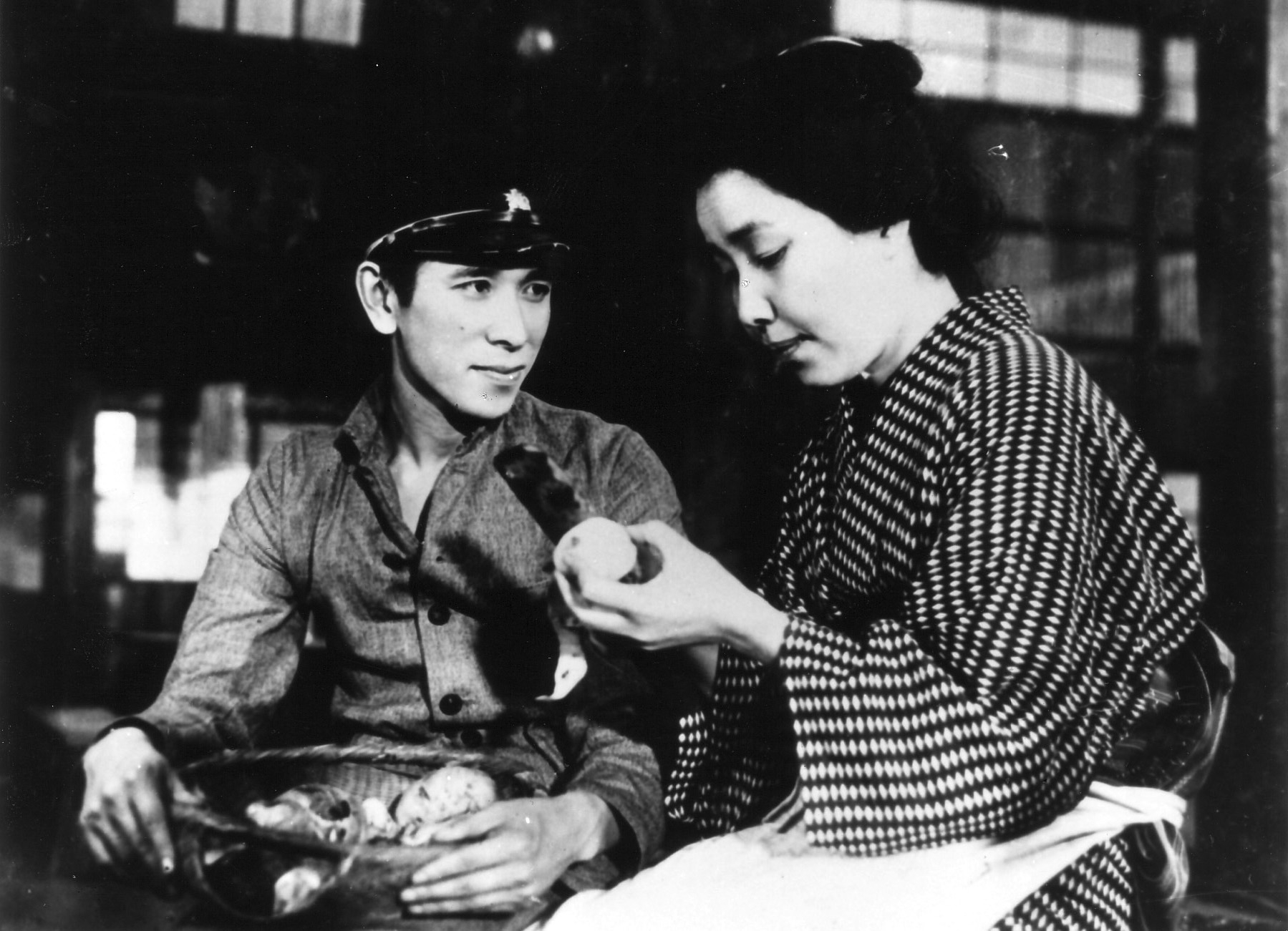
- Kōji Mitsui and Chōko Iida in A Story of Floating Weeds
- Directed by: Yasujirō Ozu
- Screenplay by: Tadao Ikeda
- Story by: Yasujirō Ozu (credited as James Maki)
- Starring: Takeshi Sakamoto; Chōko Iida; Kōji Mitsui; Emiko Yagumo; Yoshiko Tsubouchi
- Cinematography: Hideo Shigehara
- Edited by: Hideo Shigehara
- Production company: Shochiku
- Distributed by: Shochiku
- Release date: November 23, 1934
- Running time: 86 minutes
- Country: Japan
- Languages: Silent film Japanese intertitles

A Story of Floating Weeds (Japanese: 浮草物語, Hepburn: Ukigusa monogatari) is a 1934 silent film directed by Yasujirō Ozu; he remade it — in sound and color — in 1959, shortening the title to Floating Weeds. The film won the Kinema Junpo Award for Best Film of the Year in 1934.

== Plot ==
A traveling kabuki troupe arrives by train in a provincial Japanese town. Kihachi Ichikawa, the head of the troupe, was once a popular actor, but is now past his prime. Telling his actors he is going to see a patron, he visits Otsune, a local woman with whom he had a son years before. Now a postgraduate student, the boy, Shinkichi, thinks his father is a deceased civil servant, and that Kihachi is an uncle. Kihachi and Shinkichi spend a pleasant afternoon fishing for dace in a local river.

Persistent rain causes low attendance at the troupe's performances. One day, one of the actors accidentally reveals to Otaka, Kihachi's lead actress and current mistress, that Kihachi's daily absences are to visit Otsune. Jealous, Otaka visits Otsune's restaurant with fellow actress Otoki. Kihachi becomes enraged, dragging Otaka outside and warning her never to come and harass the mother and son again, before breaking off his relationship with her.

To get back at Kihachi and Otsune, Otaka asks Otoki to try to seduce Shinkichi, even offering some money for the task. Otoki waits for Shinkichi at a tree by the road and invites him to meet at the same place after her performance. Shinkichi agrees to the meeting, and the two start a clandestine love affair.

As time goes by, Otoki realizes she has fallen for Shinkichi, and she tells him to forget her because she is merely a traveling actress. When Kihachi discovers the affair, he confronts Otoki and slaps her, demanding to know what she wants. Otoki says she is not after money, and reveals Otaka's machinations. Kihachi beats up Otaka, but she refuses to apologize, saying now they are even, and asks to reconcile. Shinkichi and Otoki run away together.

Kihachi disbands his troupe, and the actors spend a bittersweet last night together, drinking and singing. He visits Otsune, and she says they should tell Shinkichi of his true paternity, and Kihachi should stay with her for good. Although he agrees, the return of Shinkichi and Otoki leads to a violent quarrel between father and son after Kihachi hits Otoki repeatedly. Otsune tells Shinkichi that Kihachi is his father, but Shinkichi refuses to acknowledge him, saying his true father would not have abandoned them. When she responds that Kihachi did not want Shinkichi to become a traveling actor, and always paid for his schooling, Shinkichi's anger softens somewhat, and he leaves for his room on the verge of tears.

Affected by Shinkichi's words, Kihachi decides he cannot stay, and he tells Otsune that he is going to start another troupe, and will return once he is a great actor. Otoki asks to join him, but he leaves her in Otsune's care, asking her to help his son become a great man. She goes to get Shinkichi, but Kihachi is gone by the time he gets downstairs.

At the railway station, Kihachi sees Otaka, who gives him matches to light his pipe. He invites her to help him organize his new traveling troupe, and she buys a ticket to accompany him. On the train, they share a snack, and Kihachi looks wistfully at a sleeping boy.

== Cast ==
- Takeshi Sakamoto as Kihachi Ichikawa
- Chōko Iida as Otsune, Ka-yan, Shinkichi's mother
- Kōji Mitsui (credited as Hideo Mitsui) as Shinkichi, Kihachi and Otsune's son
- Emiko Yagumo (credited as Rieko Yagumo) as Otaka, an actress and Kihachi's mistress
- Yoshiko Tsubouchi as Otoki, a young actress
- Tomio Aoki as Tomiboh, a young boy in Kihachi's troupe
- Reikô Tani as Tomibo's father

Rest of cast listed alphabetically:

- Kiyoshi Aono as Sword trainer
- Mariko Aoyama as Barber's landlady
- Mitsumura Ikebe as Villager
- Seiji Nishimura as Kichi, an actor
- Mitsuru Wakamiya as Station attendant
- Nagamasa Yamada as Maako, an actor

== Reception ==
Leonard Maltin gave the film three of four stars, writing: "Absorbing drama has its merits but pales beside Floating Weeds, Ozu's sublime 1959 remake."

== Legacy ==
In 2005, the New York Guitar Festival commissioned Alex de Grassi to compose a score to A Story of Floating Weeds. The guitarist performed his original music to accompany the film at the 2006 New York Guitar Festival.
