= Iida Chōko =

Japanese actress (1897–1972)

- 飯田蝶子
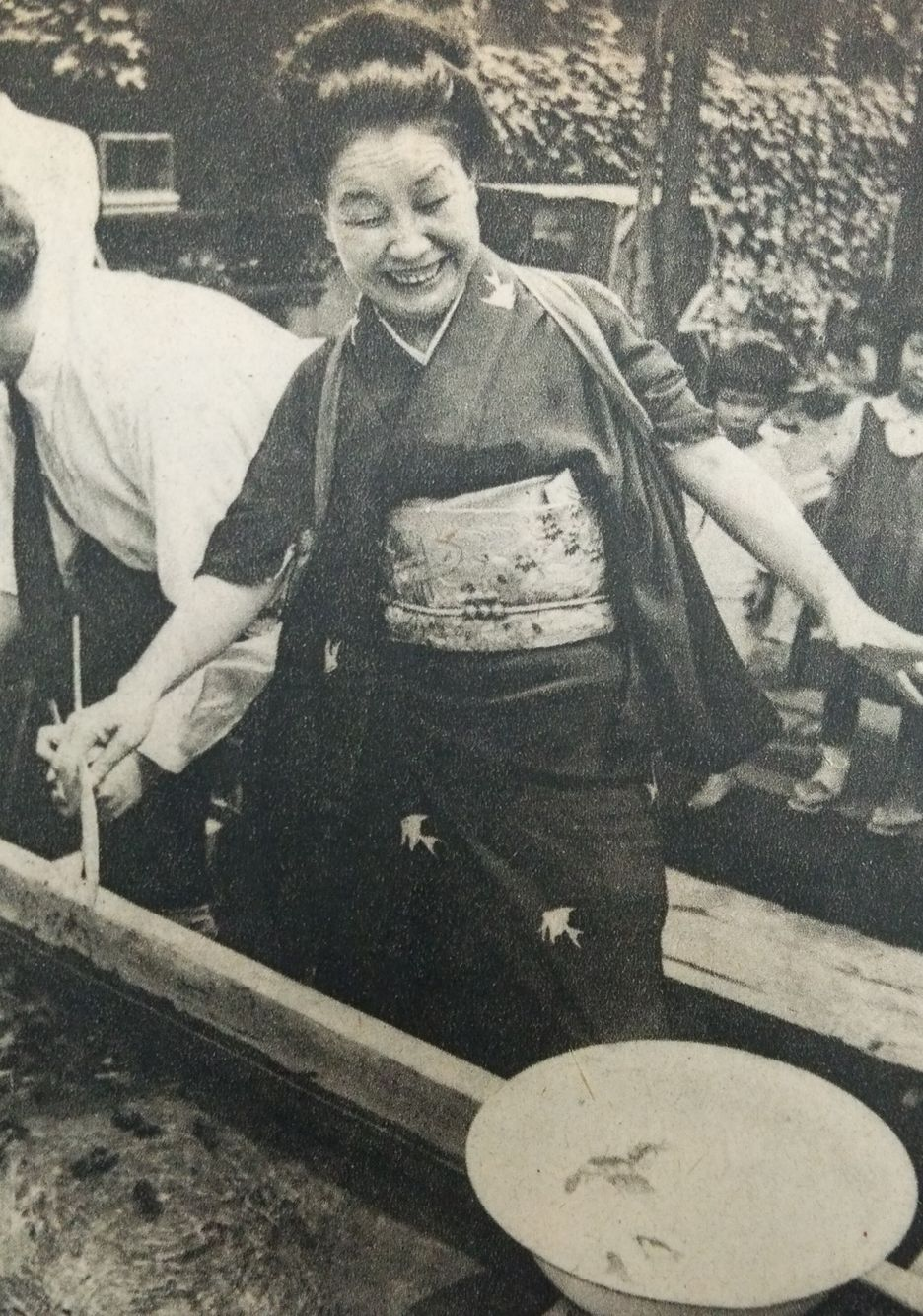
- Born: Iida Tefu; April 15, 1897; Asakusa, Japan
- Died: December 26, 1972 (aged 75)
- Occupation: Actress

Iida Chōko (Japanese: 飯田 蝶子; April 15, 1897 – December 26, 1972) was a Japanese actress. Her real name was Shigehara Tefu. She played working class women and grandmothers, and appeared in more than 300 films. Her husband was cameraman Shigehara Hideo.

== Biography ==
=== Early life ===
Iida was born on April 15, 1897, in what is now Asakusa, Tokyo. Though her father was a minor official with the Ministry of Communications, the family didn't have much money, so Iida was sent to live with her maternal grandmother at 2 years old. Iida was the oldest of 5 children, but because of their poverty the children became malnourished and developed nyctalopia. After studying at a private elementary school, Iida entered the Ueno Koto Jogakko with her grandmother's help, and worked at an outdoor exhibition at night to help with the family's finances. She eventually found that she enjoyed working more than school. She stopped attending school for two months until the seasonal exhibition closed in autumn.

=== Career as an actress ===
In 1913 Iida began working at the Matsuzakaya in Ueno. She worked in several positions there, including in the sewing department and as a clerk. In 1919, Iida began writing for an entertainment newspaper company in Nihonbashi. That autumn, Nakamura Matagoro, a kabuki actor, put out an ad in the Miyako Shinbun for an actress to perform for a theater called the Asakusa Koen Gekijo. They hired Iida, but she found that all of her roles were of handmaidens. When the theater director died in 1920, the theater was dissolved. Iida applied to work at film studios, but was rejected.

=== Entering Shochiku Kamata ===
In 1922 Iida and a friend from her newspaper days applied to work at the Shochiku Kamata Shashincho. They originally hired only Iida's friend, but one of Iida's colleagues who worked at Shochiku stepped in and encouraged them to hire her for supporting roles, like maids.

In January 1923, Iida officially entered the company. She debuted in the film Shi ni iku tsuma. Her first film that made her famous was Yami o iku, in which she was praised by director Yoshinobu Ikeda for playing a sexually unappealing laborer. Iida then received good reviews and a bonus for her role as an elderly woman in Kiyohiko Ushihara's Jinsei no Ai. She briefly moved to another film studio after the 1923 Great Kanto Earthquake, but soon returned to the Kamata studio in January 1924.

=== Shochiku ===
In 1924, while playing a female factory worker in Ikeda's Sweet Home, Iida cut her lip on an apple crate during a scene in which she attacks Moroguchi Tsuzuya. She needed two stitches, and resolved to refine her acting skills. In July of that year, Iida was asked to act in more comedies, like Yoshino Jiro's "Gamaguchi". In 1925, Iida began training to become management with Kobayashi Tokuji and Futaba Kaoru. In 1926 Iida was officially promoted to upper management with Morino Goro. Iida married Hideo Shigehara, a camera operator, in 1927. Shigehara worked often with Yasujirō Ozu, and Iida played supporting roles in many of his films, such as Days of Youth and Tokyo Chorus. As the film world moved from silent movies to "talkies", Iida began studying rakugo. Her first sound film was Chushingura in 1932. She later became known for her expressive acting style in Ozu's A Story of Floating Weeds.

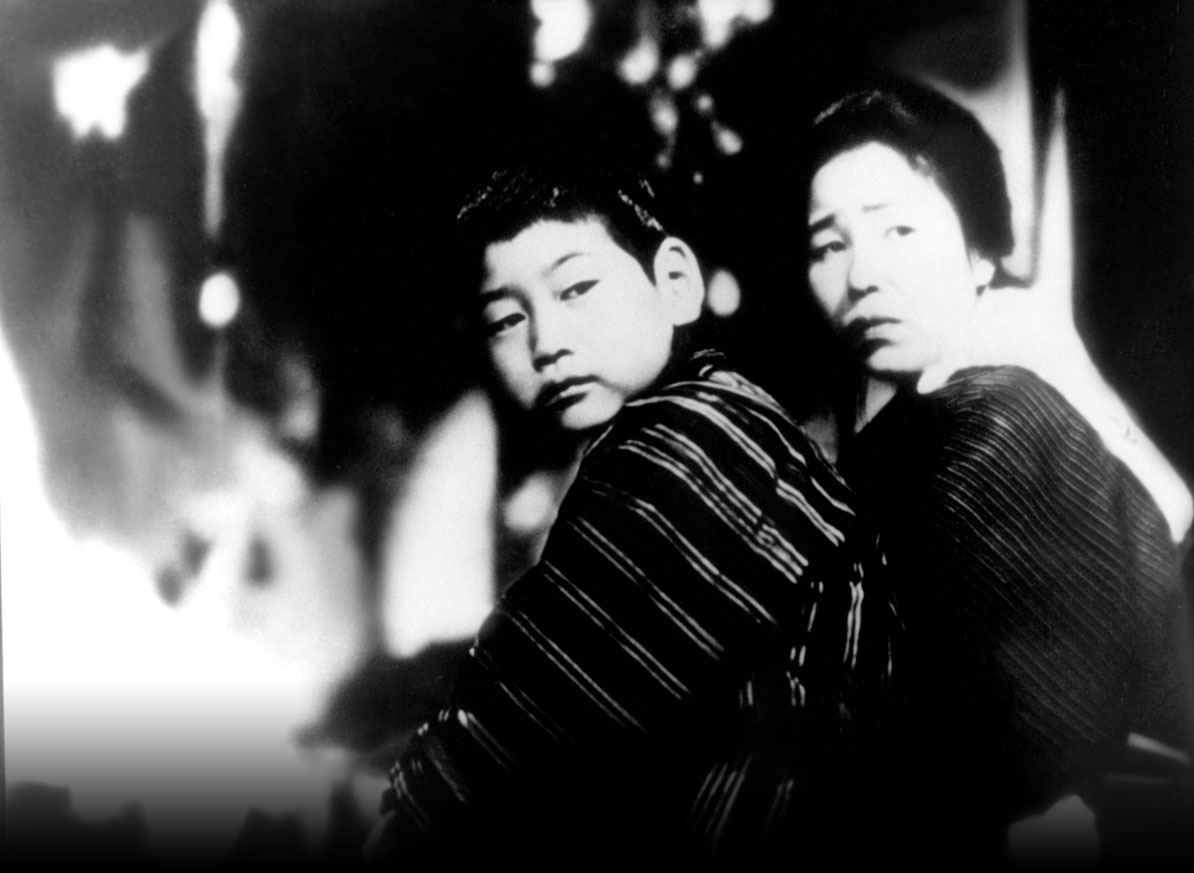
The Only Son (1936)

=== Post-war and death ===
Iida's first film after the war ended in 1945 was Heinosuke Gosho's Izu no Musumetachi. This film was also Iida's last film with Shochiku, and she left them to become a freelancer. Her first post-war film with Yasujirō Ozu was Record of a Tenement Gentleman, in 1947. She also appeared in Akira Kurosawa's Drunken Angel and Stray Dog, Hiroshi Inagaki's Rickshaw Man, and Horikawa Hiromichi's Hadaka no Taisho. She also played the main character's grandmother in Toho's Wakadaisho series. She also appeared in many television dramas. She was awarded a Medal of Honor in 1963, and an Order of the Sacred Treasure in 1967. In the same year, her husband died.

While filming a television drama on July 26, 1972, Iida's health suddenly worsened. She was taken to the hospital the next day, where she was diagnosed with pleurisy. She died of lung cancer on December 26, 1972.

== Filmography ==
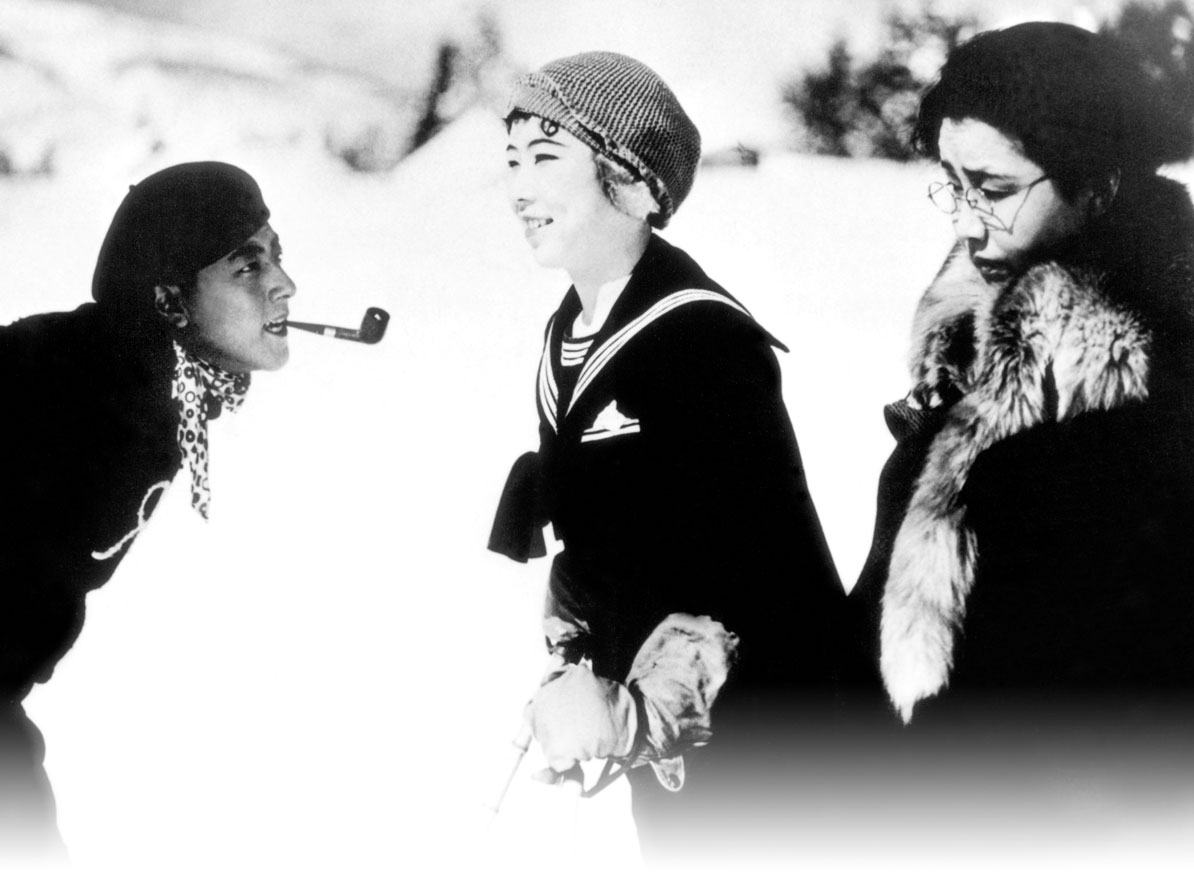
Days of Youth (1929)

Film performances
Year	Title	Role
1923	Shi ni iku tsuma	
1928	Body Beautiful	Ritsuko
1929	Treasure Mountain (1929)	Owner of the Umenoya
1929	Days of Youth	Chieko's aunt
1929	I Graduated, But...	Boarding house owner
1931	Tokyo Chorus	Teacher's wife
1932	Until the Day We Meet Again	Maid
1932	Chushingura (1932 film)	Fuwa Kazuemon's wife
1932	Passing Fancy	Otome
1933	Every-Night Dreams	Proprietess
1933	Apart from You	Landlady of geisha house
1934	A Mother Should Be Loved	Cleaning lady
1934	A Story of Floating Weeds	Otsune, Ka-yan
1934	Our Neighbor, Miss Yae	Hamako Hattori
1935	An Inn in Tokyo	Otsune
1936	The Only Son	Tsune Nonomiya
1937	What Did the Lady Forget?	Chiyoko Sugiyama
1940	Nobuko	Okei
1941	Brothers and Sisters of the Toda Family	Kiyo the maid
1946	Aru yo no Tonosama	Okuma
1947	Yottsu no Koi no Monogatari	Black market woman
1947	Aru yo no Tonosama	Otane
1947	Haru no Mezame	Tama Takemura
1948	Drunken Angel	Bāya
1949	Tonosama Hoteru	Teru
1949	Stray Dog	
1950	Conduct Report on Professor Ishinaka	
1950	A Mother's Love	
1952	Rikon	Kikuyo
1954	Dobu	Tami
1955	Keisatsu Nikki	Tatsu
1955	Takekurabe	Otoki
1955	The Eternal Breasts	
1956	Mahiru no ankoku	Uemura Tsuna
1956	Romantic Daughters	Woman at the department store
1957	Yellow Crow	
1957	Stepbrothers	Masu
1958	Rickshaw Man	Otora (innkeeper)
1961	As a Wife, As a Woman	
1961–1970	Wakadaisho series	Tanuma Riki
1962	A Wanderer's Notebook	Owner of the candy shop
