= Tokyo Chorus =

1931 film by Yasujirō Ozu

- Film poster
- Directed by: Yasujirō Ozu
- Written by: Komatsu Kitamura (adaptation); Kōgo Noda (scenario)
- Produced by: Shochiku Kinema
- Starring: Tokihiko Okada; Emiko Yagumo
- Cinematography: Hideo Shigehara
- Edited by: Hideo Shigehara
- Production company: Shochiku
- Distributed by: Shochiku
- Release date: 15 August 1931 (Japan)
- Running time: 90 min.
- Country: Japan
- Languages: silent film Japanese intertitles

Tokyo Chorus (東京(とうきょう)の合唱(コーラス), Tōkyō no Kōrasu) is a 1931 Japanese silent film directed by Yasujirō Ozu and starring Tokihiko Okada and Emiko Yagumo. It was based on various stories in the Shoshimin-gai (Middle Class Avenue) series and shares influences with King Vidor's The Crowd. Most of the film takes place in Tokyo during a depression-like time in the beginning of the Shōwa period.

== Plot ==
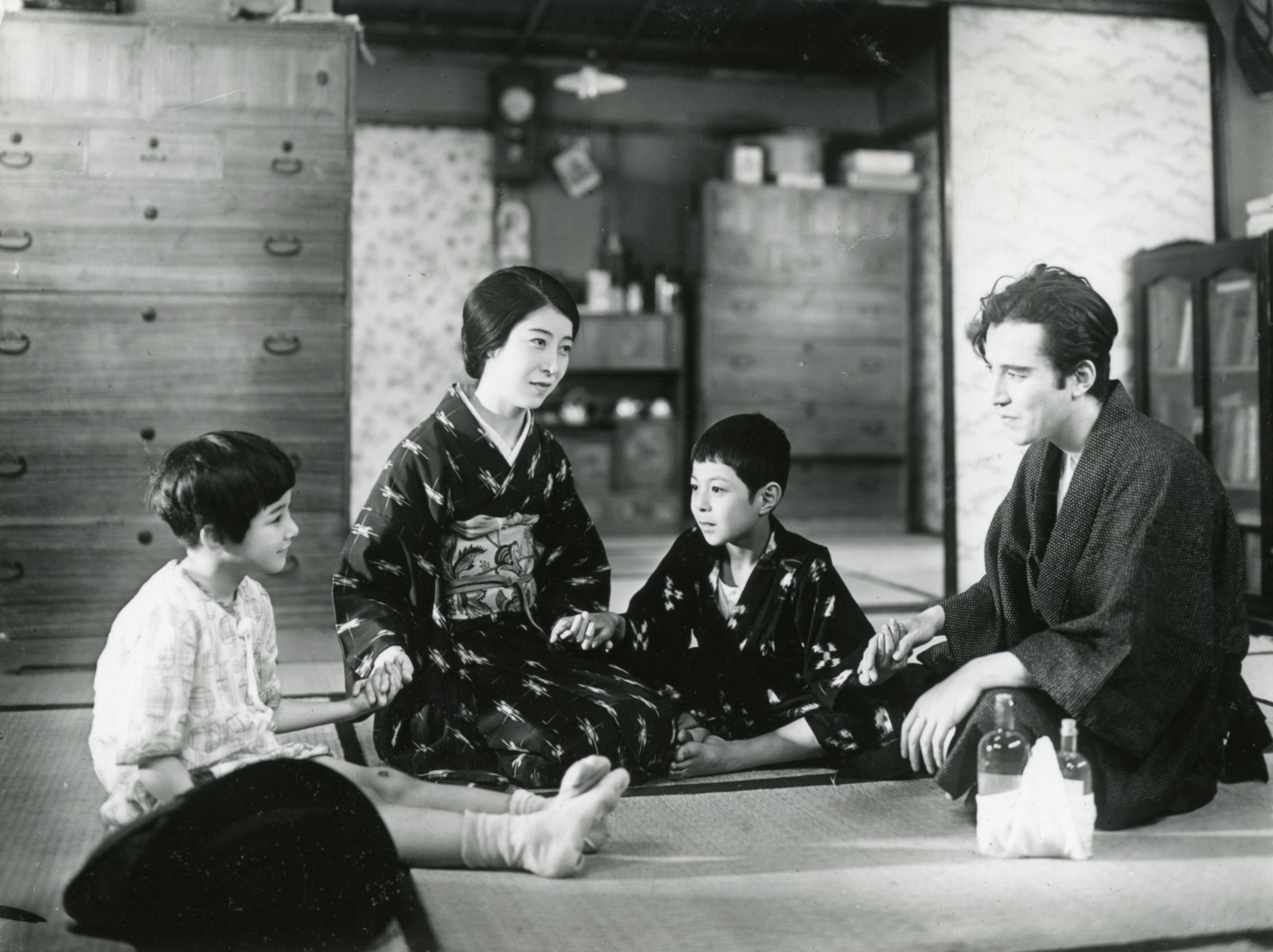
Still of Hideko Takamine, Emiko Yagumo, Hideo Sugawara and Tokihiko Okada in the film

The story starts with a group of young men attending school drills under the direction of Mr. Omura (Tatsuo Saitō). Shinji Okajima (Tokihiko Okada) is seen goofing off, misbehaving, and upsetting his teacher. Okajima is disciplined, the drills resume. and the boys eventually graduate and go into the working world. Okajima has grown up, has a family, and works as an insurance salesman. On the day of their annual bonuses, the men are all anxious. Okajima's son (Hideo Sugawara) has his heart set on a bicycle. After receiving his bonus, Okajima writes the list of presents he will buy for his family. A co-worker named Rou-Shain Yamada (Takeshi Sakamoto) is laid off because his last two clients died shortly after signing their policies. Upset for him, Okajima gathers the other workers to "protest at least once" to the boss, but the others back down, and one such worker (Isamu Yamaguchi) challenges Okajima to make the protest himself. Okajima takes the challenge. While in the office, the boss is offended at the subject, and the two begin a comedic fight. By the end of the fight, Okajima is fired and bows as he leaves. He returns home with a scooter for his son, who immediately is disappointed and throws a tantrum. His wife Tsuma Sugako (Emiko Yagumo) returns from the market and tries to calm the boy while Choujo tells her what happened.

Sugako scolds her husband saying he should not lie to children. He eventually shows her his discharge notice, and she tries to get her son to accept the scooter. Chounan refuses, and Okajima says quietly that they should buy him a bike, which by the next scene they apparently have. Still looking for employment, Okajima does his best to be pleasant. He sees his son playing with a group of boys and their bikes only to be told that Miyoko is sick with "childhood diarrhea". Upset, he takes his son and rushes home to find it is true. Sugako informs him the doctor wanted Miyoko to stay at the hospital, but due to money concerns, she waited. Okajima says he will make the money somehow and tells his son to summon a rickshaw to take them all to the hospital. At the hospital, Miyoko recovers apparently quickly, but they are forced to sell Sugako's kimono to pay the bill.

Still in need of work, a well-dressed Okajimo encounters Mr. Omura, his old teacher. Omura has quit teaching and now runs a restaurant called The Calorie Café that mainly serves curry rice. He offers Okajima a temporary job holding a banner and passing out flyers; the very job Douryou ended up with earlier in the film after he was fired. Okajima is disappointed as he feels it is beneath him; but takes it for his family. Sugako is distraught at the thought of her husband working such a degrading job, but decides to join them at the restaurant.

One day, Sugako, Tsuma, Mr. and Mrs Omura (Choko Iida) are cooking big plates of curry rice. Omura invites his schoolmates to the restaurant for a meeting. The class sits at the table and drinks happily. As they eat, a letter arrives from the Ministry of Education; it is a notification of a job for Okajima, teaching English in a small rural town at a girls school. After discussing the matter, Okajima and his wife return to the dining room, and the final student arrives "late as always". Everyone celebrates and breaks out into song.

== Release ==
The film was released in Japan in 1931. It did not see a release in the U.S. until 1982. It was released in Japan on DVD as part of a box set from Shochiku Company in 2003. It was released with a new score by Donald Sosin on DVD in the U.S. in 2008 through The Criterion Collection.

== Cast ==
| Actor | Role |
|---|---|
| Tokihiko Okada | Shinji Okajima |
| Emiko Yagumo | Sugako, Shinji's wife |
| Hideo Sugawara | their seven-year-old son |
| Hideko Takamine | Miyoko, their daughter |
| Tatsuo Saitō | Ōmura Sensei, a teacher |
| Chōko Iida | Mrs Ōmura |
| Takeshi Sakamoto | Yamada, an elderly employee |
| Reikō Tani | the company president |
| Ken'ichi Miyajima | the president's secretary |
| Kanji Kawara | the doctor |
| Isamu Yamaguchi | Shinji's colleague |

== Reception ==
Leonard Maltin gave it three and a half of four stars: "Elegant, emotionally resounding social drama with comedic touches involves the everyday struggles of a Tokyo family. ... Ozu offers poignant commentary on the plight of the unemployed and movingly contrasts the carefree nature of childhood to the stresses of adult responsibility."
