= Emiko Yagumo =

Japanese silent film actress (1903–1979)

- 八雲恵美子
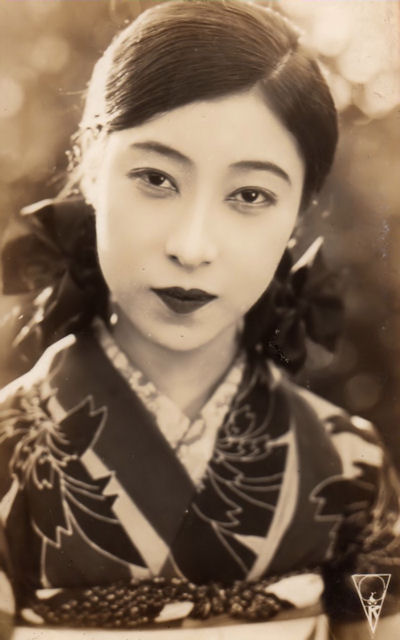
- Born: Chiyoko Tamano; 15 August 1903; Kita-ku, Osaka, Empire of Japan
- Died: 13 January 1979 (aged 75)
- Education: Shochiku Musical Theatre Department; Shochiku Kamata
- Occupation: Actress
- Years active: 1926-1937

Emiko Yagumo (Japanese: 八雲恵美子, 15 August 1903 – 13 January 1979), real name Chiyoko Tamano (Japanese: 玉野 千代子), was a Japanese silent film actress.

== Biography ==
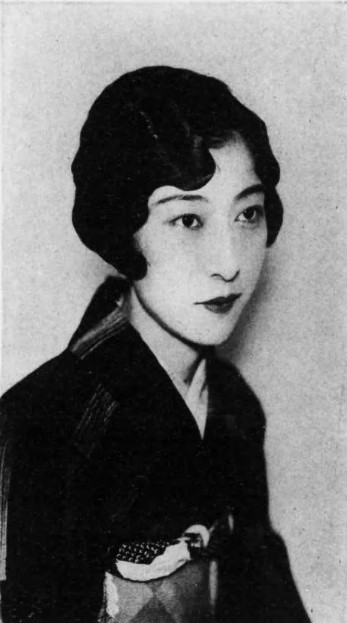
Yakumo in 1928

Chiyoko Tamano, better known by the stage name Emiko Yagumo, was born on 15 August 1903 in Kita-ku, Osaka, Empire of Japan.

Yagumo joined the Shochiku Musical Theatre Department in Osaka in 1924 and Shochiku Kamata in 1926. By the age of 19, Yagumo was performing in silent films as a kanbu (leading actress). From 1928 to 1931, Yagumo starred in eight films alongside leading actor Denmei Suzuki (1900–1985).

Yagumo was an icon of the modan gāru (modern girl) subculture in Japan and featured on advertisements for cosmetics such as face powder.

Yagumo died on 13 January 1979, aged 75.

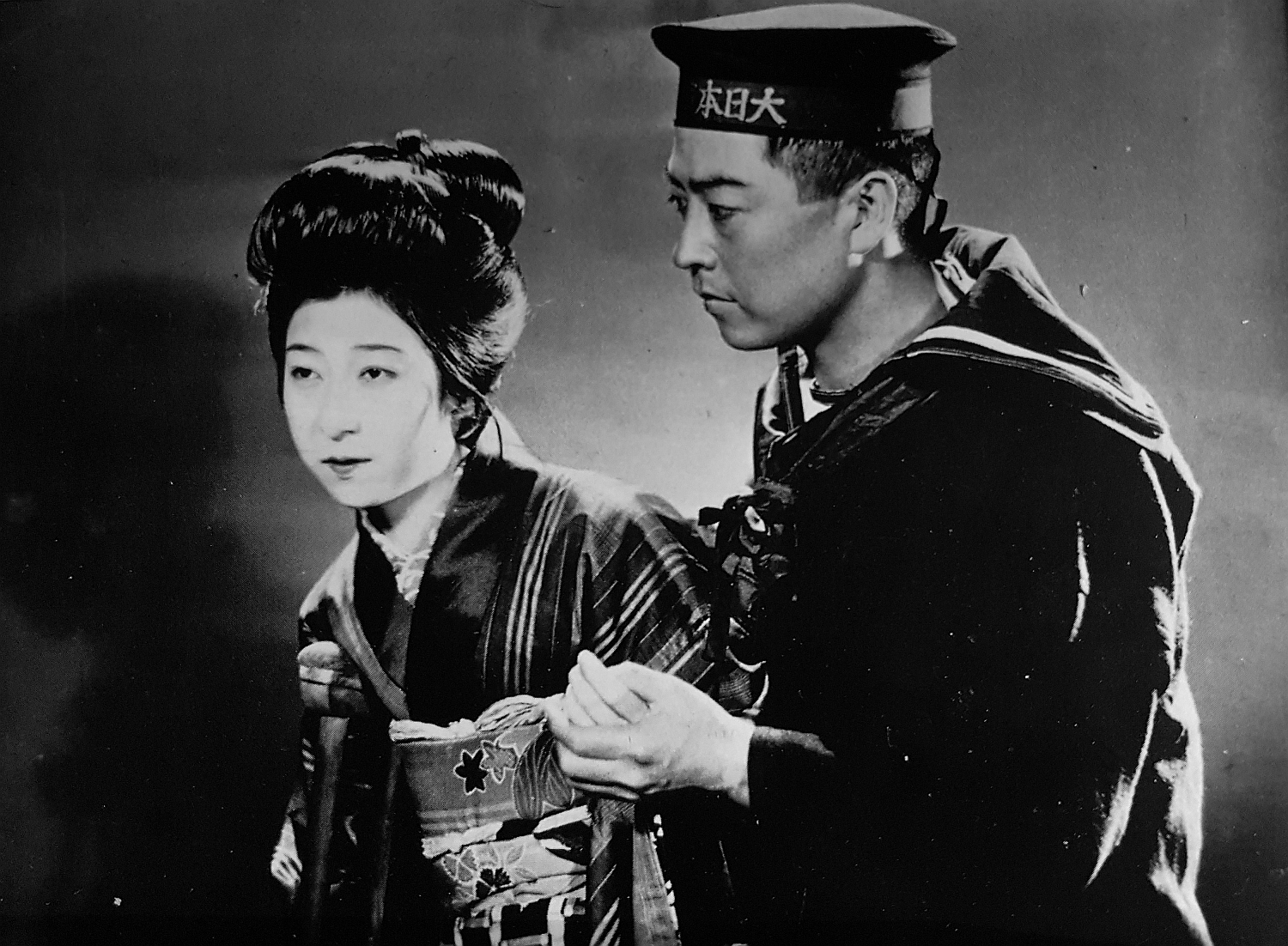
Emiko Yagumo in Mura no hanayome [fr] (1928)

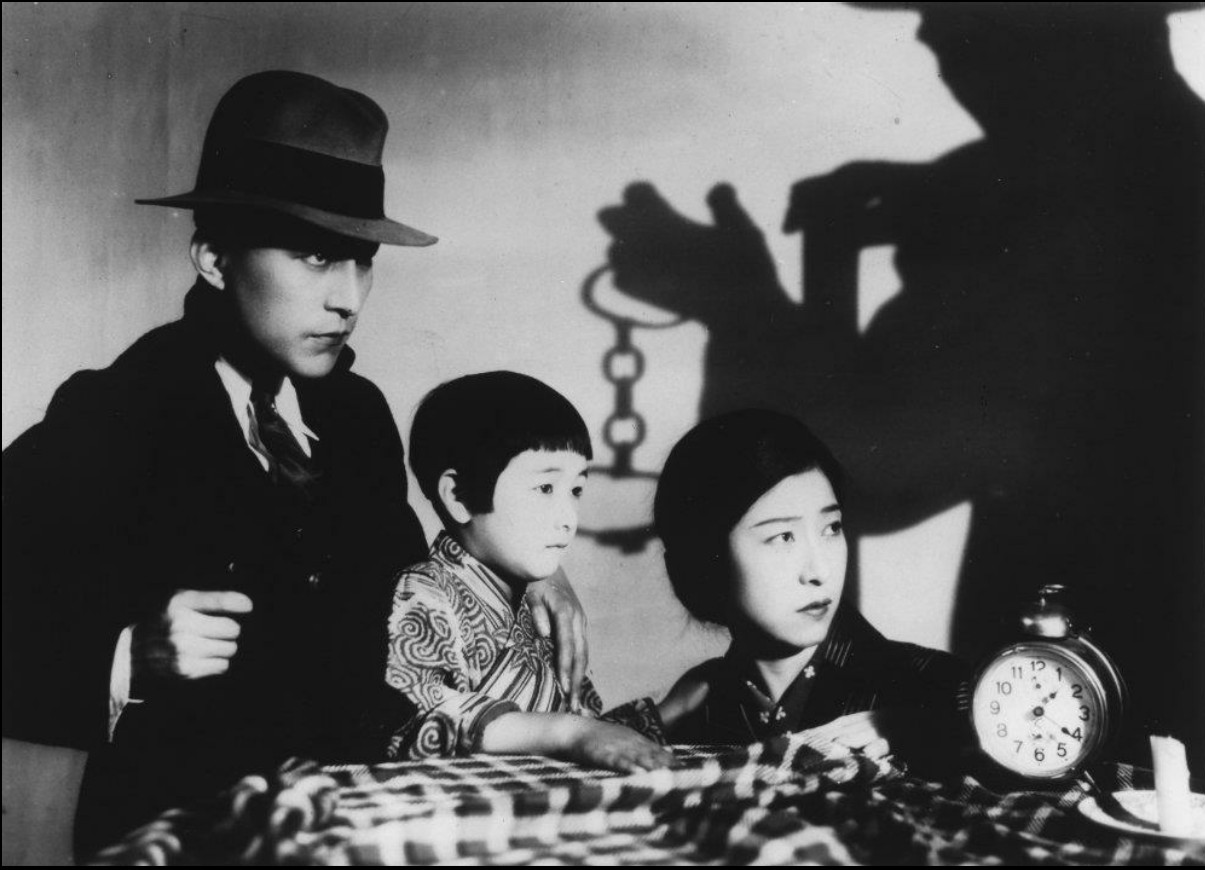
Tokihiko Okada, Mitsuko Ichimura and Emiko Yagumo in Sono yo no tsuma (That Night's Wife, 1930)

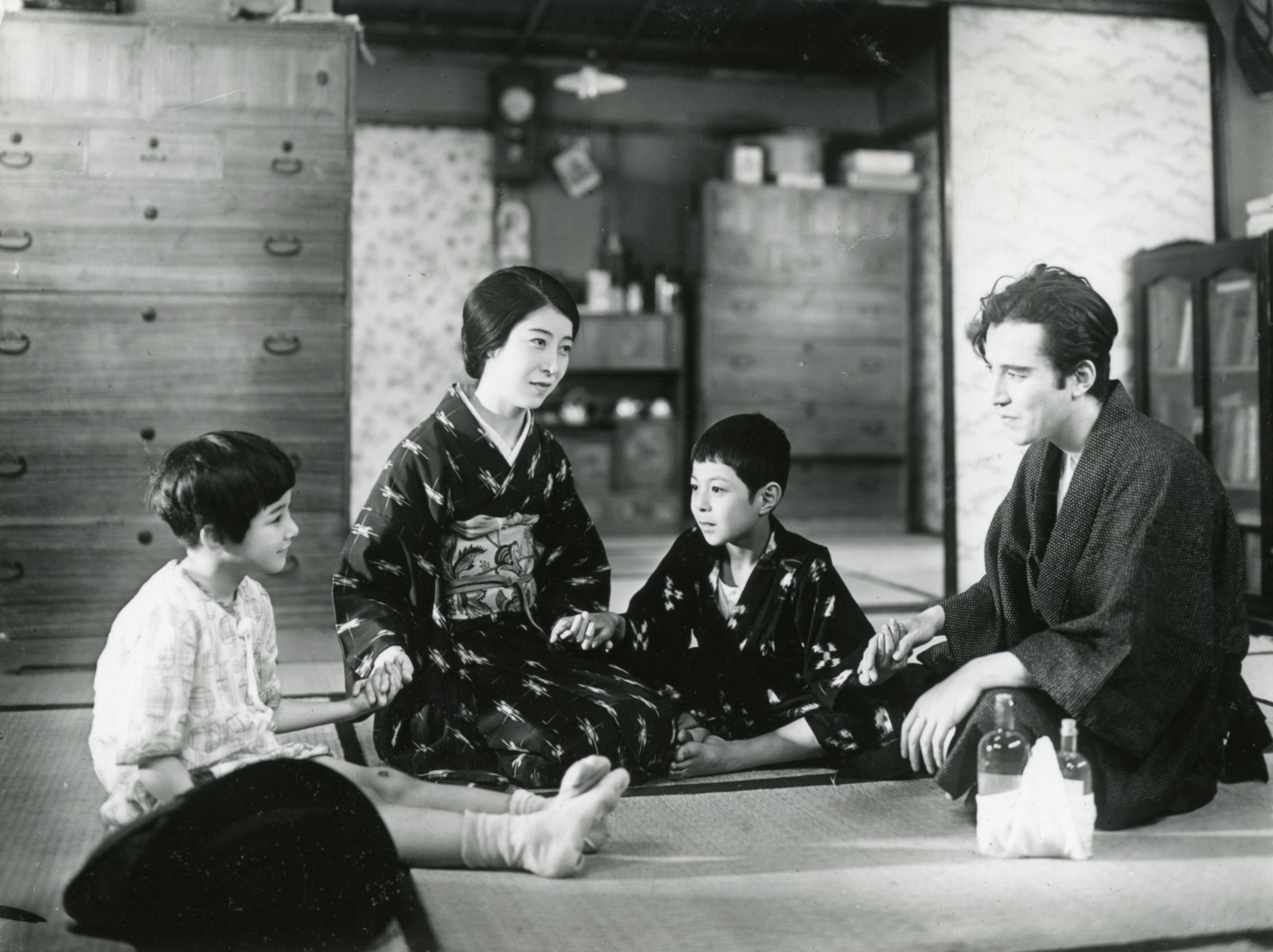
Hideko Takamine, Emiko Yagumo, Hideo Sugawara and Tokihiko Okada in Tōkyō no kōrasu (Tokyo Chorus, 1931)

== Filmography ==
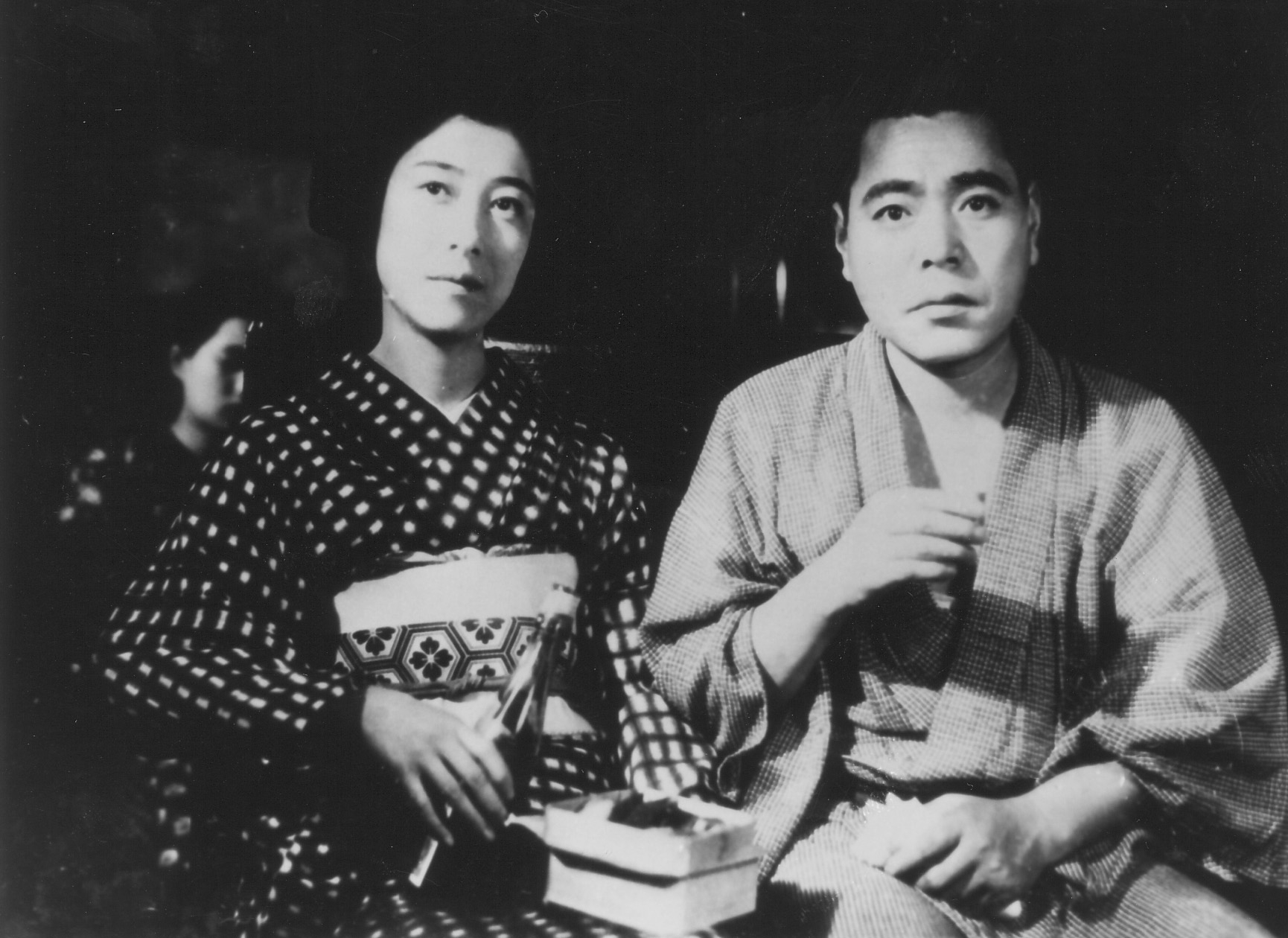
- Emiko Yagumo and Takeshi Sakamoto in Ukikusa monogatari (A Story of Floating Weeds, 1934)
  1926: Hatsukoi (dir. Heinosuke Gosho)
- 1926: Obotchan (dir. Yasujirō Shimazu)
- 1926: Haha-yo koishi (dir. Heinosuke Gosho)
- 1926: Ningen ai (dir. Shigeyoshi Suzuki)
- 1926: Kiri no naka no tomoshibi (dir. Shigeyoshi Suzuki)
- 1926: Musume (dir. Heinosuke Gosho)
- 1926: Kaeranu sasabue (dir. Heinosuke Gosho)
- 1926: Kyokuba-dan no shimai (dir. Shigeyoshi Suzuki, Torajirō Saitō)
- 1926: Nijibare (dir. Yasujirō Shimazu)
- 1926: Kanojo (dir. Heinosuke Gosho)
- 1927: Sannin no musume (dir. Hiroshi Shimizu)
- 1927: Hazukashii yume (dir. Heinosuke Gosho)
- 1927: Karakuri musume (dir. Heinosuke Gosho)
- 1927: Koi wa kusemono (dir. Hiroshi Shimizu)
- 1927: Honoo no sora (dir. Hiroshi Shimizu)
- 1927: Jinsei no namida (dir. Hiroshi Shimizu)
- 1927: Tōkyō koshin-kyoku (dir. Heinosuke Gosho)
- 1928: Mura no hanayome (dir. Heinosuke Gosho)
- 1928: Onna no isshō (dir. Yoshinobu Ikeda)
- 1928: Bijin Kashima (dir. Hōtei Nomura)
- 1928: Kare to Tōkyō (dir. Kiyohiko Ushihara)
- 1928: Tomioka sensei (dir. Hōtei Nomura)
- 1928: Toge no rakuen (dir. Hōtei Nomura)
- 1928: Kare to den'en (dir. Kiyohiko Ushihara)
- 1928: Riku no ōja (dir. Kiyohiko Ushihara)
- 1929: Oyaji to sono ko (dir. Heinosuke Gosho)
- 1929: Fue no shiratama (dir. Hiroshi Shimizu)
- 1930: Rebū no shimai (dir. Yasujirō Shimazu)
- 1930: Reijin (dir. Yasujirō Shimazu)
- 1930: Sono Yo no Tsuma (dir. Yasujirō Ozu)
- 1930: Kiri no naka no akebono (dir. Hiroshi Shimizu)
- 1931: Ginga (dir. Hiroshi Shimizu)
- 1931: Nikutai no bōfū (dir. Tsutomu Shigemune)
- 1931: Bōfū-u no bara (dir. Hōtei Nomura)
- 1931: Tōkyō no kōrasu (Tokyo Chorus, dir. Yasujirō Ozu)
- 1932: Koi no Tōkyō (dir. Heinosuke Gosho)
- 1932: Chūshingura: Akō Kyō no maki (dir. Teinosuke Kinugasa)
- 1932: Chūshingura: Edo no maki (dir. Teinosuke Kinugasa)
- 1933: Koi zange (dir. Tsutomu Shigemune)
- 1933: Kinō no onna (dir. Keisuke Sasaki)
- 1933: Tenryū kudareba (dir. Hōtei Nomura)
- 1933: Risō no otto (dir. Tsutomu Shigemune)
- 1933: Chinchōge (dir. Hōtei Nomura)
- 1934: Ukikusa monogatari (A Story of Floating Weeds, dir. Yasujirō Ozu)
- 1935: Eikyū no ai: Zenpen (dir. Yoshinobu Ikeda)
- 1935: Eikyū no ai: Kōhen (dir. Yoshinobu Ikeda)
- 1936: Hirenge (dir. Yasushi Sasaki)
- 1936: Haha no omokage (dir. Keisuke Sasaki)
- 1936: Kanjō sanmyaku (dir. Hiroshi Shimizu)
- 1936: Ofumi no hyōban (dir. Keisuke Sasaki)
- 1937: Midare Shimada (dir. Seiichi Ina)
- 1937: Asakusa no hi (dir. Yasujirō Shimazu)
