= Tokihiko Okada =

Japanese actor

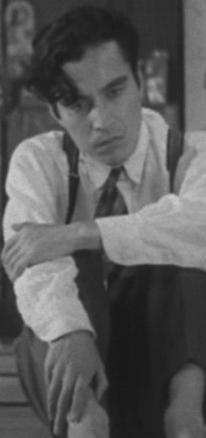
Tokihiko Okada.

Tokihiko Okada (岡田 時彦) (February 18, 1903 – January 16, 1934) was a silent film star in Japan during the 1920s and early 1930s. A native of Tokyo, he first started at the Taikatsu studio and later became a leading player for Japanese directors such as Yasujirō Ozu and Kenji Mizoguchi. Film critic Tadao Sato recounts that Okada was among the handsome and favorite Japanese actors of the era. Throughout his career, Okada played the role of the quintessential nimaime (translated as "second line") which were romantic, sensitive men as opposed to the rugged and hard-boiled leading men known as tateyaku. He was the father of film actress Mariko Okada. Tokihiko Okada died of tuberculosis at age 30.

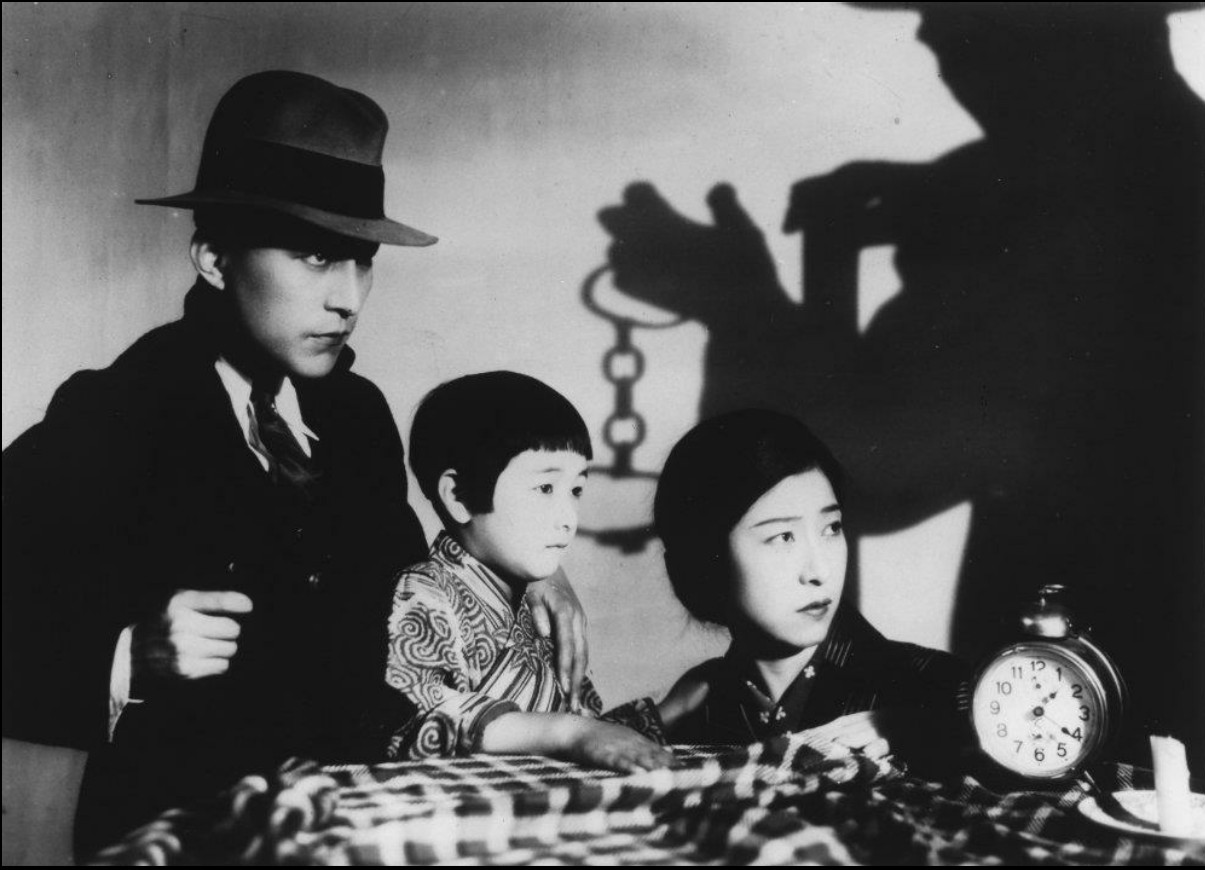
Tokihiko Okada, Mitsuko Ichimura and Emiko Yagumo in Sono yo no tsuma (That Night's Wife, 1930)

== Filmography ==
Year	Film	Role	Notes
1920	Amateur Club	Shigeru's friend / Hideo Inoue / Hatsugiku	On credit: Eiichi Takahashi
1920	Katsushika Sunako	Kitsunosuke	On credit: Kurao Nora
1921	Hinamatsuri no yoru	Spirit of rabbit	On credit: Kurao Nora
1921	Jasei no in	Toyoo	On credit: Eiichi Takahashi
1922	Jondai no bouken		On credit: Eiichi Takahashi
1924	Natsukashiki haha	Minoru Murase	First film as Tokihiko Okada
1924	Onna ni amai otoko no mure	the writer	
1924	Gion no haru, chiri yuku hana		
1924	Kyokan wo idete		
1924	Ringo		
1924	Koi no ryoujin	Kimio Yoshida	
1924	Arashi no seirei		
1924	Donzoko	Murakami	
1924	In yori You e		
1925	Koufuku		
1925	Kouro		
1925	Dohatsu		
1925	Kiro ni tachite		
1925	Nadare		
1925	Kemuri		
1925	Ningen Raisan		
1925	Wakoudo no chi wa odoru		
1925	Maboroshi no hansen	Shao Jun Chang	
1926	Shinsei no aikou		
1926	Nyoubou Kawaiya		
1926	Kami ningyo no haru no sasayaki	Sumio Kaijima	
1926	Reimei no uta		
1926	Kyoko to Shizuko		
1926	Gantou no nazo		
1926	Mito Koumon	Tsunaeda Tokugawa	
1926	Ashi ni sawatta onna	Yumeo Matsudo	
1926	Shin Nihontou: zen-kouhen	Second Lieutenant Yuzou Matsushima	
1927	Kare wo meguru gonin no onna		
1927	Okubo Hikozaemon	Iemitsu Tokugawa	
1927	Tokkan koi no uijin		
1927	Jihi shincho	Shunsuke Shinohara	
1930	Sono Yo no Tsuma	Shuji Hashizume	
1931	Tokyo Chorus	Shinji Okajima	
