= Ureo Egawa =

Japanese actor (1902–1970)

Ureo Egawa 江川宇礼雄
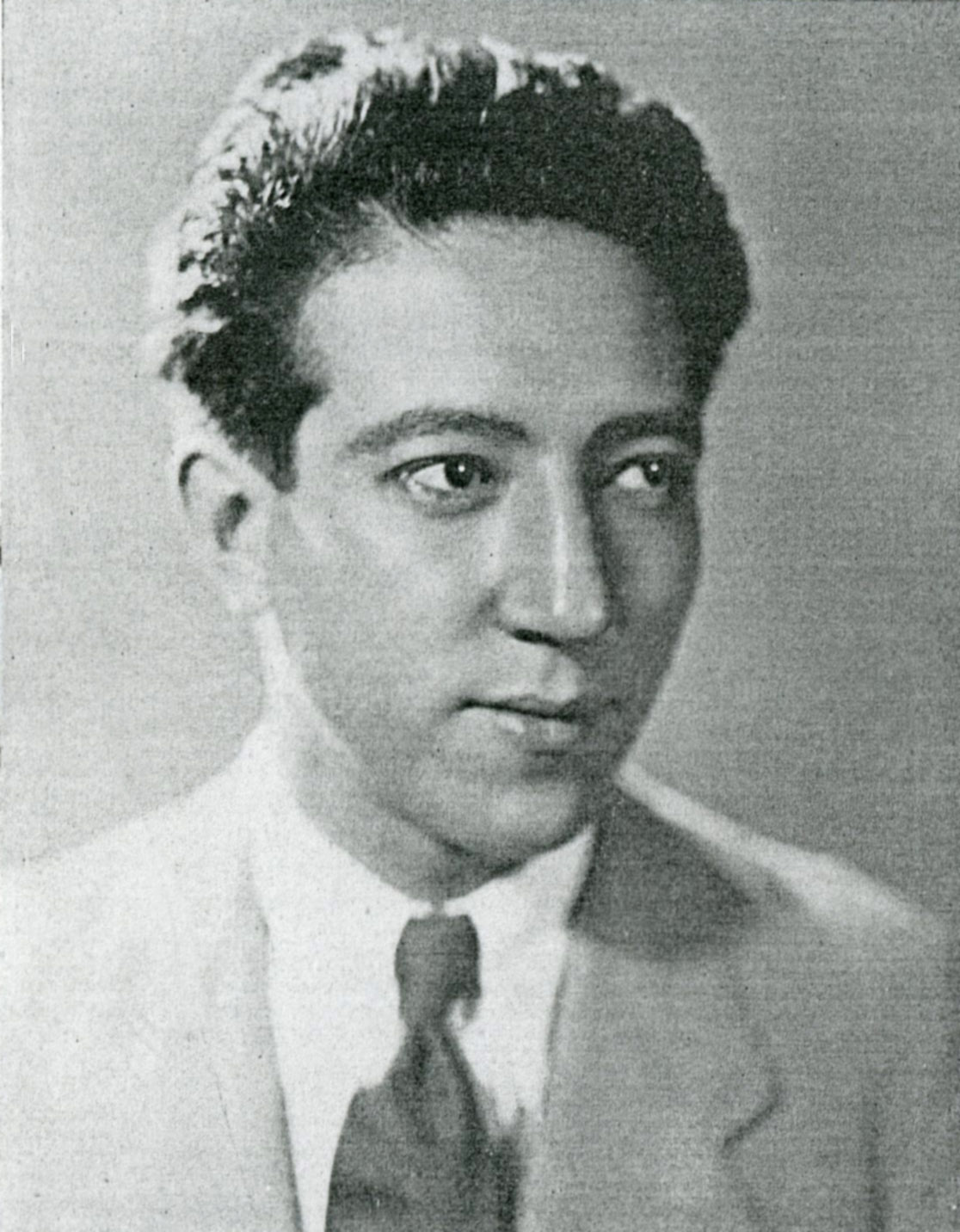
- Ureo Egawa in 1934
- Born: 7 May 1902; Kanagawa Prefecture, Japan
- Died: 20 May 1970 (aged 68)
- Occupation: Actor
- Height: 6’2

Ureo Egawa (江川 宇礼雄, Egawa Ureo; 7 May 1902 – 20 May 1970) was a Japanese actor active from the 1920s to the 1960s.

== Career ==
Egawa was born in Kanagawa Prefecture to a Japanese mother and a German father. His name "Ureo" is a Japanification of his German name "Willy". He joined the Taikatsu film studio in 1920, but not finding stable work, he joined a gang of delinquents. Egawa of this period became the model for Ton Satomi's novel Juvenile Delinquent (不良少年, Furyō Shōnen). Putting his life back together, he debuted as a director in 1927, but eventually joined the Shochiku studio as an actor, where he starred in films by directors such as Yasujirō Ozu and Yasujirō Shimazu. He later worked at Nikkatsu, Toho and Shintoho, before appearing on television in the 1960s, most famously in Ultra Q. In his later years, he did charity work to help other mixed-race children.

== Selected filmography ==
=== Film ===
- Kyôdainaka wa (1921)
- Fumetsu Shinran - Jidai-hen; Gendai-hen (1929) - Ichirô
- Ômoîde oki onna (1931)
- Seikatsu-sen ABC (1931)
- Nanatsu no umi: Zenpen - Shojo-hen (1931) - Yuzuru
- Depâto no himegimi (1932)
- Konjiki yasha (1932) - Fujita Taro
- Nanatsu no umi: Kôhen - Teisô-hen (1932) - Yuzuru
- Sanjûni-nen-gata ren'ai bushidô (1932)
- Manshû kôshinkyoku (1932)
- Aa, Kuga shôsa (1932)
- Mushibameru haru (1932) - Seichirô Komori
- Satsueijo romansu, renai annai (1932)
- Byakuya wa akaruku (1932) - Shôichirô Amagasaki
- Seishun no yume ima izuko (1932) - Tetsuo Horino
- Bôfûtai (1932)
- Joriku dai-ippo (1932)
- Hanayome no negoto (1933) - Enatsu
- Woman of Tokyo (東京の女, Tokyo no onna) (1933) - Ryoichi
- Ôendanchô no koi (1933) - Miyajima
- Shima no musume (1933)
- Kimi to wakarete (1933) - Guest
- Seidon (1933) - Minoru Katagiri
- Japanese Girls at the Harbor (港の日本娘, Minato no Nihon musume) (1933) - Henry
- Koi no shôhaî (1933)
- Sasurai no otome (1933)
- Ureshii koro (1933) - Yasuo Tsuda
- Rappa to musume (1933)
- Kekkon kaido (1933)
- Hatsukoi no haru (1933)
- Gaika no kage ni (1934)
- Sakura ondo (1934)
- Chijô no seiza - Zempen: Chijô-hen (1934)
- Chijô no seiza - Kôhen: Seiza-hen (1934)
- Tajô bûsshîn (1934)
- Seppun jûjiro (1935)
- Nozokareta hanayome (1935)
- Jazz no machikado (1935)
- Olympic yokochô (1937)
- Etchan (1937) - Rokutaro Yanagi
- Kagirinaki zenshin (限りなき前進) (1937)
- Jidai no kiri - Harumi no maki (1937)
- Dai-kongô no fu (1938)
- Tokyo yôsai (1938)
- Apâto kôkyôkyoku (1938)
- Robo no ishi (1938)
- Seifuku no machi - Zempen (1939)
- Seifuku no machi - Kôhen (1939)
- Kesa to Morito (1939)
- Sonno sonjuku (1939)
- Nessa no chikai (Zenpen; Kôhen) (1940) - Ichiro Sugiyama
- Kinô kieta otoko (1941) - Rokunoshin Hara, yoriki
- Anî no hânayomê (1941) - Kenichi Kanou
- Gubijinsô (1941) - Hajime Munechika
- Yukiko to natsuyo (1941)
- Wagaya ha tanoshi (1941)
- The Sky of Hope (1942) - Vunoshin Narishima
- Midori no daichi (1942) - Kozoo Izawa
- Matte ita otoko (1942)
- Yottsu no kekkon (1944) - Chutaro Okuma
- Minshū no Teki (1946)
- Kyô wa odote (1947)
- Kyûjukyû niume no hanayome (1947)
- Mitari kiitari tameshitari (1947)
- Kakedashi jidai (1947) - Brother-In-law Kohei
- Ano yume kono uta (1948) - Principal
- Kuro-uma no danshichi (1948)
- Fujisancho (1948)
- Haha (1948)
- Ikiteiru gazô (1948)
- Shirozukin arawaru (1949) - Jun'an Yasuda
- Haru no tawamure (1949)
- Goodbye (1949) - Kenzo Sekine
- Nabeshima kaibyou den (1949)
- Kage o Shitaite (1949)
- Tsuma to onna kisha: Wakai ai no kiki (1950) - Editor in chief
- Kimi to yuku America kôro (1950)
- Banana musume (1950)
- Amakara chindôchû (1950)
- Wakasama samurai torimonochô: nazo no nômen yashiki (1950) - Masaki Hiromitsu
- Uchôten jidai (1951)
- Tsuki yori no haha (1951)
- Inu-himesama (1952)
- Rikon (離婚) (1952) - Shôgo Yamamura
- Tokyo no ekubo (1952)
- Yatarô gasa: zenkôhen (1952) - Tamazô
- Waga koi no lila no kokage ni (1953)
- Kenkyô edo-murasaki (1954)
- Kimimachi-bune (1954) - Gondô
- Hatsuwarai kaneigozen jiai (1954)
- Tasogare sakaba (1955) - Yamaguchi
- Akagi no chi matsuri (1955)
- Hokkai no hanran (1956) - Captain Abe
- Chakkari fujin to Ukkari fujin: Fûfu goenman no maki (1956) - President
- Morishige no Shinkonryoko (1956)
- Kengo tai goketsu: Homare no kessen (1956)
- Daigaku no kengo keiraku no abarenbo (1956)
- Onryo sakura dai-sodo (1956) - Chief Bodyguard
- Kaii Utsunomiya tsuritenjô (1956) - Kawamura Utsubo
- Onna keirin-ô (1956) - Mitarai
- Kenji to sono imôto (1956)
- Gunshin Yamamoto gensui to Rengô kantai (1956)
- Nichibei Hanayome Hanamuko Irekae Torikae Gassen (1957) - Mr. McKinley
- Meiji tennô to nichiro daisenso (1957)
- Escapade in Japan (1957) - Chief of Kyoto Police (uncredited)
- Yojaso no maou (1957) - Professor Sakurada
- Sen'un Ajia no Joō (戦雲アジアの女王) (1957)
- Tenka no oni yashahime (1957)
- Star Dokusatsu Jiken (1958)
- Equinox Flower (1958) - Schoolmate Nakanishi
- Tennô, kôgô to nisshin sensô (1958)
- Kyōen Kobanzame (侠艶小判鮫, Kyōen Kobanzame) (1958)
- Daitoa senso to kokusai saiban (1959) - Lawyer Shimazu
- Teisô no Arashi (1959) - Eizô Murofushi
- Kagebôshi torimonochô (1959)
- Tsubanari sankengô (1959)
- Boku wa dokushin shain (1960) - President of Dômei Oil Company
- Ni-nirokushiken Daisshutsu (1962)
- Nippon ichi no horafuki otoko (1964) - President Saijô

=== Television ===
- Ultra Q (1966–1967) - Dr. Ichinotani (final appearance)
