= Takeshi Sakamoto =

Japanese actor (1899–1974)

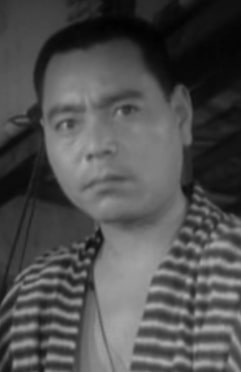
- Sakamoto in A Story of Floating Weeds
- Born: Buhei Nagaishi; 21 September 1899; Akō, Hyogo, Japan
- Died: 10 May 1974 (aged 74)
- Occupation: Actor
- Years active: 1925–1965

Takeshi Sakamoto (坂本武, Sakamoto Takeshi; 21 September 1899 – 10 May 1974) was a Japanese actor. He appeared in more than 300 films between 1925 and 1965, mostly in productions of the Shōchiku studio. He gained popularity as a supporting character, working for directors such as Yasujirō Ozu, Keisuke Kinoshita, Mikio Naruse, Hiroshi Shimizu, and Heinosuke Gosho.

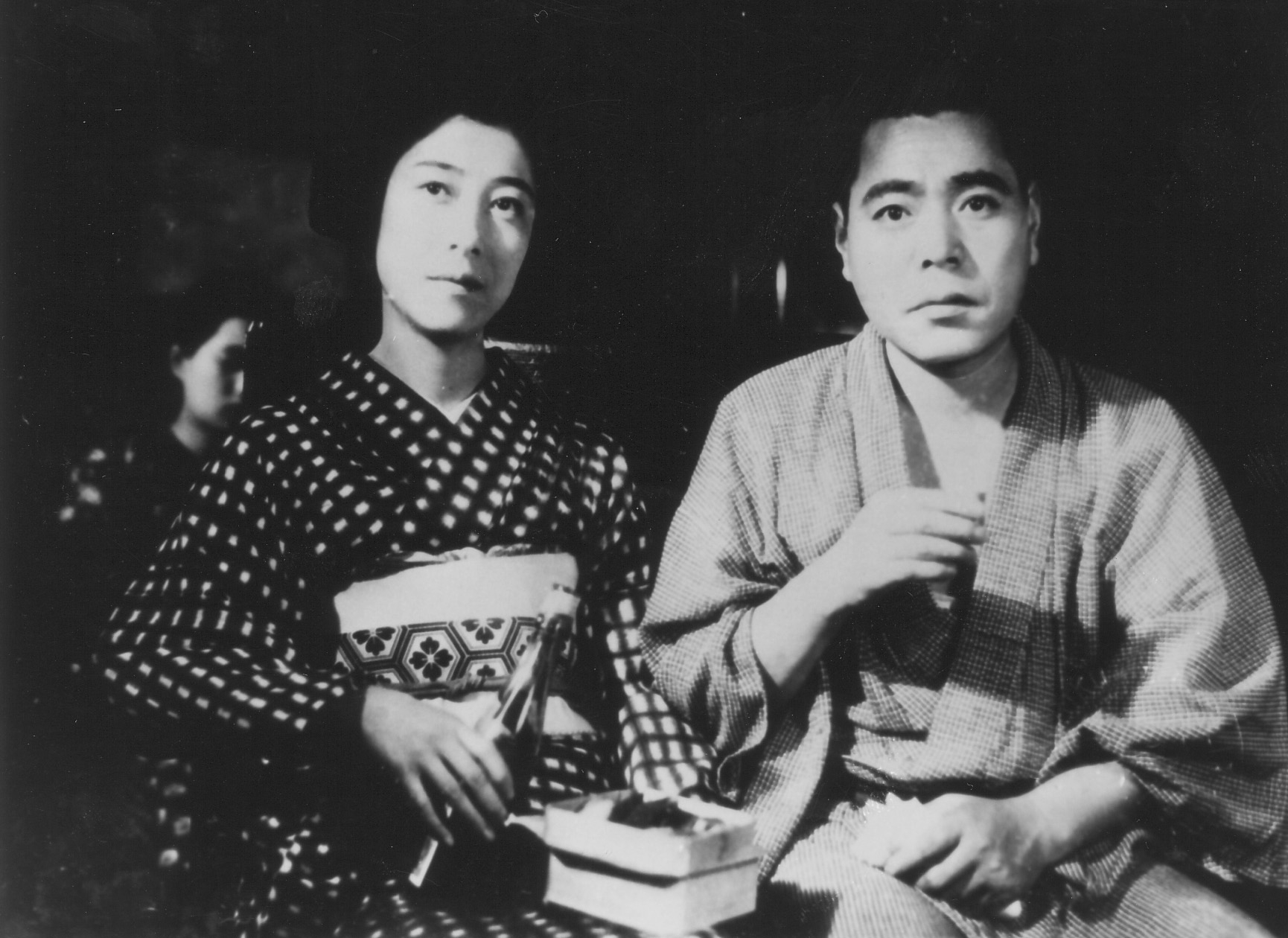
Emiko Yagumo and Takeshi Sakamoto in Ukikusa monogatari (A Story of Floating Weeds, 1934)

== Selected filmography ==
- 1929: Days of Youth
- 1931: The Neighbor's Wife and Mine
- 1931: Tokyo Chorus
- 1932: I Was Born, But...
- 1933: The Dancing Girl of Izu
- 1933: Every-Night Dreams
- 1933: Passing Fancy
- 1933: Wasei Kingu Kongu
- 1934: A Story of Floating Weeds
- 1935: An Inn in Tokyo
- 1937: What Did the Lady Forget?
- 1938: The Masseurs and a Woman
- 1939: A Brother and His Younger Sister
- 1940: The Story of Tank Commander Nishizumi
- 1941: Brothers and Sisters of the Toda Family
- 1941: Ornamental Hairpin
- 1947: The Record of a Tenement Gentleman
- 1948: A Hen in the Wind
- 1951: Carmen Comes Home
- 1951: Nami
- 1952: Ringo-en no shōjo
- 1953: Where Chimneys Are Seen
- 1953: Ojōsan shachō
- 1955: Takekurabe
- 1957: Times of Joy and Sorrow
- 1957: Untamed
- 1963: A Legend or Was It?
