= Tatsuo Saitō =

Japanese actor (1902–1968)

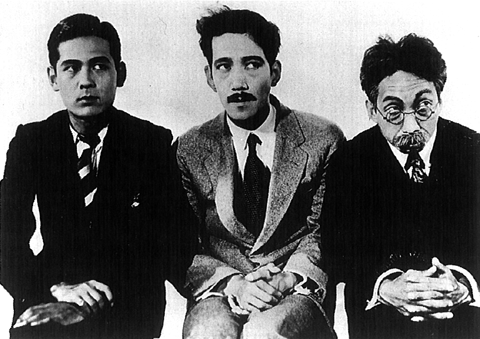
- Tatsuo Saitō (center) in Ashi ni sawatta kōun
- Born: 10 June 1902; Tokyo, Japan
- Died: 2 March 1968 (aged 65); Tokyo, Japan
- Occupation: Actor
- Years active: 1925–1967

Tatsuo Saitō (斎藤 達雄, Saitō Tatsuo; 10 June 1902 – 2 March 1968) was a Japanese film actor and director. He appeared in more than two hundred films between 1925 and 1967.

== Career ==
Saitō joined Nikkatsu studios, where he made his film debut in 1925, before moving to Shochiku two years later. He appeared in many films of Yasujirō Ozu between 1929 and 1950, and repeatedly worked for directors like Heinosuke Gosho and Hiroshi Shimizu. After the Second World War, he also directed a number of films and appeared in many television films and series.

== Selected filmography ==
Year	Title	Director
1929	Days of Youth	Yasujirō Ozu
1931	Tokyo Chorus	Yasujirō Ozu
1932	I Was Born, But...	Yasujirō Ozu
1933	Japanese Girls at the Harbour	Hiroshi Shimizu
1933	Every-Night Dreams	Mikio Naruse
1935	Burden of Life	Heinosuke Gosho
1937	What Did the Lady Forget?	Yasujirō Ozu
1941	Brothers and Sisters of the Toda Family	Yasujirō Ozu
1941	Ornamental Hairpin	Hiroshi Shimizu
1950	The Munekata Sisters	Yasujirō Ozu
1951	Tokyo File 212	Dorrell McGowan, Stuart E. McGowan
1952	Rikon	Masahiro Makino
1952	Carmen's Pure Love	Keisuke Kinoshita
1953	Totsugu koyoi ni	Tatsuo Saitō (also actor and writer)
1957	Elegy of the North	Heinosuke Gosho
1962	My Geisha	Jack Cardiff
1965	Lord Jim	Richard Brooks
