= Chigasakikan =

Traditional Japanese inn in Kanagawa, Japan

- Location within Japan

General information
- Location: Chigasaki Kanagawa, Japan
- Coordinates: 35.3203901°N 139.400923°E
- Opening: 1899
- Owner: Hiroaki Mori

Other information
- Number of rooms: 4
- Number of restaurants: 1
- Parking: 10

Website
- www.chigasakikan.co.jp

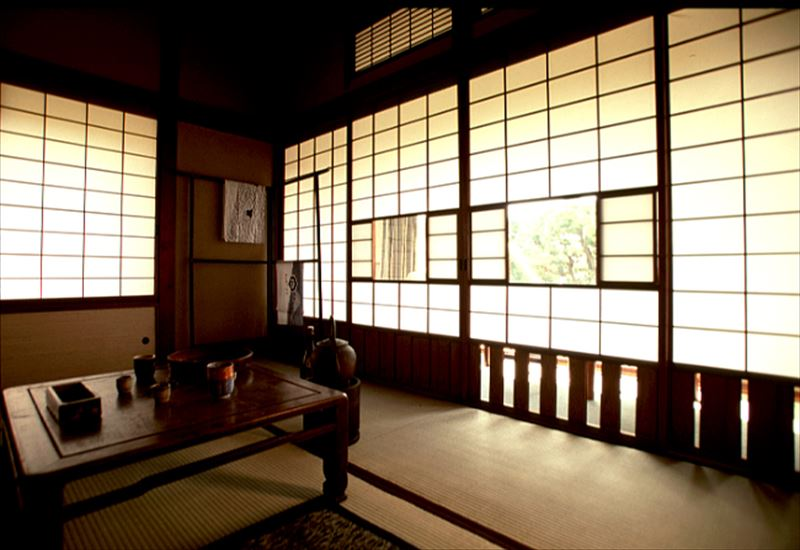
2nd "Ozu" Room

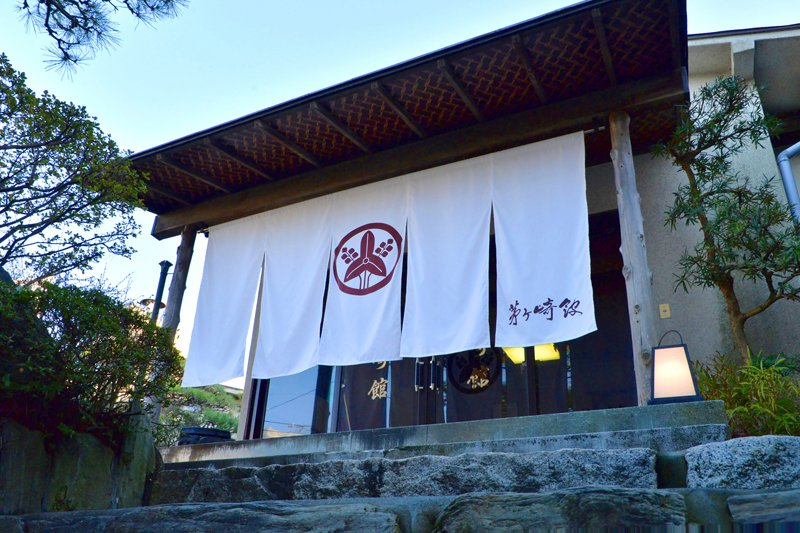

The Chigasakikan (茅ヶ崎館) is a traditional Japanese inn situated in Chigasaki, Kanagawa, Japan. Chigasakikan opened in 1899, and is one of the last remaining seaside ryokan in the Shonan region, which were once abundant. Film directors such as Yasujirō Ozu and Kaneto Shindo were among those who regularly used the area as their holiday home.

== History ==
Chigasakikan was founded in 1899 by Shinjiro Mori, an engineer from Aichi prefecture.

In 1914, Chigasaki Beach was ranked as the 10th best summer resort in the prefecture by the Yokohama Trade Newspaper. When the celebratory event was held on the beach, Chigasakikan donated the cost of the fireworks.

Most of the architecture of the ryokan was destroyed in the 1923 Great Kanto Earthquake, with the Meiji-era Karakasa ceiling bath the only part of the venue that remained intact. The building was re-constructed in 1925.

In 1937, Yasujirō Ozu stayed at Chigasakikan for the first time. He began staying in Room 2 of the ryokan regularly from 1941, while writing his scripts, using it as his study with Takai Yanai, Tadao Ikeda, and Kogo Noda. Among the scripts Ozu wrote at Chigasakikan were There Was a Father, Record of a Tenement Gentleman, A Hen in the Wind, Late Spring, The Munetaka Sisters, Early Summer, The Flavor of Green Tea over Rice, Tokyo Story and Early Spring. During his stays, Ozu invited guests to his room and cooked for them. His specialty was "curry sukiyaki" (boiled sukiyaki with curry powder), which remains a speciality dish of the inn. Oil stains from the sukiyaki can still be seen on the ceiling of Room 2. Shozo Ishizaka released a book about Ozu's time at the ryokan in 1996.

Other directors who have used Chigasakikan as their workplace include Kazuyuki Izutsu, Azuma Morisaki, Hirokazu Kore-eda and Miwa Nishikawa. Kore'eda's Nobody Knows was screened at Chigasakikan in 2013 during the 2nd Chigasaki film festival, shortly after Kore'eda was awarded the Jury Prize at the Cannes film festival for his film Like Father, Like Son.

In 2009, the ryokan's Meiji-era bathhouse and Taisho-era lobby, second floor, and terrace were registered as tangible cultural properties.

In August 2011, the ryokan held a mid-summer "Senbaya" garden party to recover from the shock of the Tohoku earthquake and tsunami, which was visited by more than 1,000 people each day.

== Usage as film location ==
- Honey and Clover (2006) – A romantic film that depicts the lives and relationships of a group of art school students who live in the same apartment building. The scene where Morita rips up a wall painting and draws a dragon with soy sauce was shot in room 3. In real life, the actual room has glass windows and Ooka-Echizen's work is hung on the wall.
- Umi no Ue no Kimi wa, Itsumo Egao (2008) – A coming to age story about a high school girl in search of her brother's lost surfboard. Chigasakikan appears as the ryokan that displays Japan's oldest surfboard (made in the 1920s). This board had been used as a garden bench at the ryokan for over 50 years until it was identified in 2005.
- Chigasaki Story (2014) – Directed by Takuya Misawa, the film is about a love romance between 7 guests, whose lives intersect at a resort in Chigasaki, depicted by Chigasakikan.
- Vampire night (2016) – A film about the battle against vampire hunters and Medieval European vampires who arrive in Japan. Chigasakikan appears as the ryokan, deep in the mountains, that is said to have a hot spring that cures all diseases.
- 77 Heartbreaks (2016) – A Hong Kong film directed by Herman Yau, the film depicts a couple that ends their relationship after 10 years. The couple, who are fans of Yasujiro Ozu, visit Japan to stay at the Chigasakikan.
- In May 2016, the Japanese rock band Suchmos shot several scenes from the music video for their single Mint at the ryokan. The video won the Best New Artist Video-Japan at the MTV VMAJ 2016.
- Chihayafuru (2018) – The film is about Chihaya Ayase, a teenage girl who is inspired by her new classmate to take up competitive Hyakunin isshu Karuta. The hall and lounge are used as the Tokyo University Karuta club room.
- Love Roaming (2018) – A Hong Kong film directed by Charlie Choi. Sasa Tao comes to Tokyo after ending her 13-year relationship with her boyfriend. She stays at an old inn with four strange tenants, with Chigasakikan used as the film location for the inn.
- Cherry Blossoms and Demons (2019) – German film directed by Doris Dörrie. Kirin Kiki plays the landlady of Chigasakikan, in the final film of her 57-year acting career.

== Sources ==
- 1/2 Sankei newspaper (2018/1/7) Chigasakikan, "Ozu's writing lodge"
- 3 Chigasaki City homepage. "Registration tangible cultural property – Chigasaki hall"
- Ozu Yasujiro and Chigasakikan(Shozo Ishizaka published in 1996)
- Aruku yo na haysa de (Hirokazu Kore'eda published in 2013)
- X about film 2. (Miwa Nishikawa published in 2017)
