= Takashi Nagai =

Japanese physician and Catholic author (1908–1951)

Servant of God Takashi Nagai
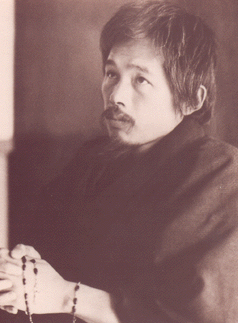
- In mourning for his wife (1946)
- Born: 3 February 1908; Matsue City, Shimane Prefecture, Empire of Japan
- Died: 1 May 1951 (aged 43); Nagasaki, Occupied Japan

Takashi Nagai (永井 隆; 3 February 1908 – 1 May 1951) was a Japanese Catholic physician, author, and survivor of the atomic bombing of Nagasaki. His subsequent life of prayer and service earned him the affectionate title "saint of Urakami". His cause for canonization was opened in 2021 and he has been titled a Servant of God.

== Biography ==
=== Early years ===
Takashi (meaning "nobility") Nagai had a difficult birth that endangered his and his mother's life. His family was highly educated. His father, Noboru Nagai, was trained in Western medicine; his paternal grandfather, Fumitaka Nagai, was a practitioner of traditional herbal medicine; and his mother, Tsune, was the descendant of an old family of samurai.

Nagai was born in Matsue and grew up in the rural area of Mitoya, raised according to the teachings of Confucius and the Shinto religion. In 1920, he commenced his secondary studies at Matsue High School boarding at his cousins' home close by. He became increasingly interested with the surrounding atheism but was curious about Christianity.

=== Life in Nagasaki ===
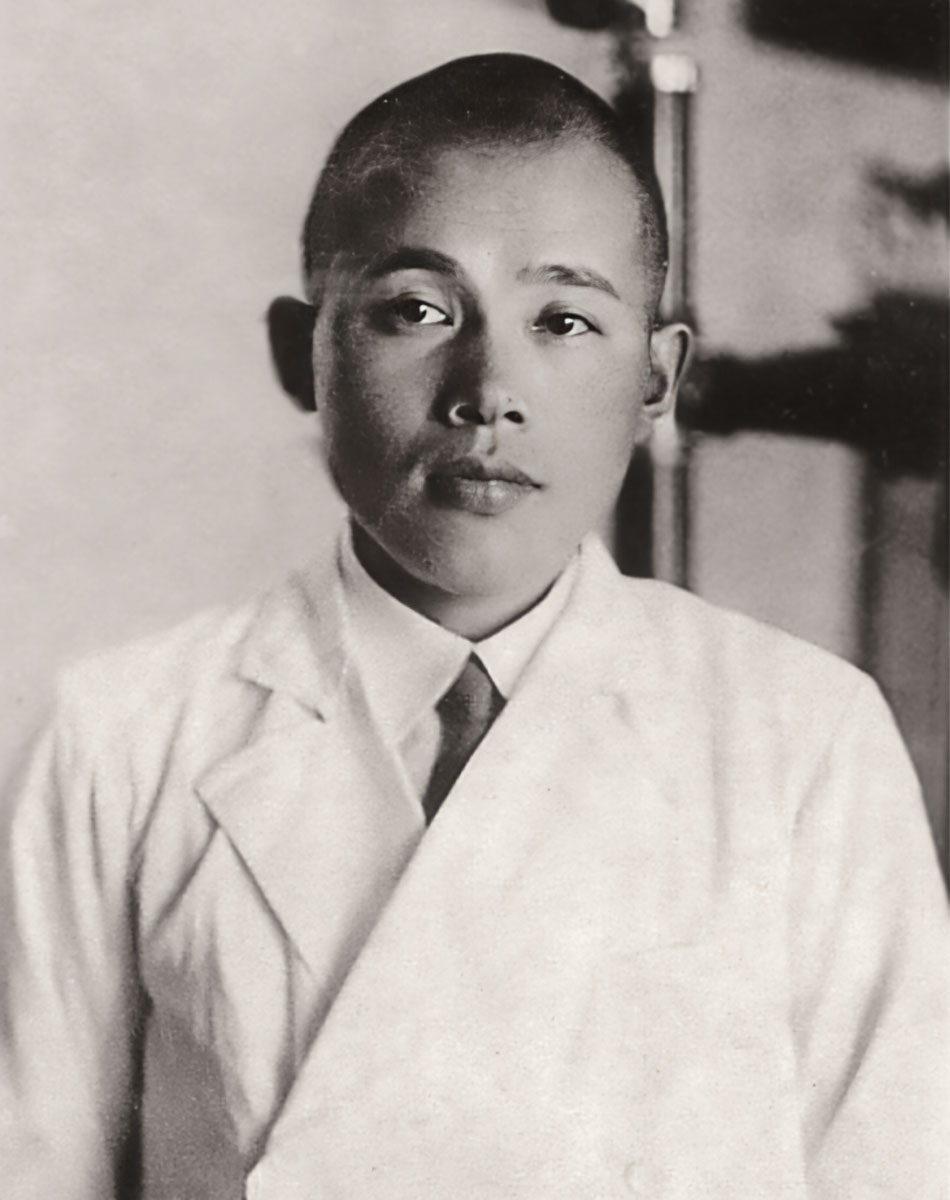
Nagai at a laboratory in Nagasaki Medical College.

In April 1928, he joined the Nagasaki Medical College where he joined the Araragi, a poetry group founded by Mokichi Saito and the university basketball team (he measured 1.71 m and weighed 70 kg).

In 1930 his mother died from a brain hemorrhage, which led him to ponder the works of philosopher and scientist Blaise Pascal. He began to read the Pensées, which influenced his later conversion to Catholicism, and boarded with the Moriyama family, who for seven generations had been the hereditary leaders of a group of Kakure Kirishitans in Urakami. Takashi learned that the construction of the nearby Immaculate Conception Cathedral in Nagasaki was financed by poor Christian farmers and fishermen.

He graduated in 1932 and was supposed to deliver an address at the ceremony. However, five days before the event, he became intoxicated at a farewell party and returned home completely soaked with water from the rain. He slept without drying himself and found the next morning that he had contracted a disease of the right ear (signs of meningitis), which made him depressed and partially deaf. He could not practice medicine and agreed to turn to radiology research.

On 24 December, Sadakichi Moriyama invited Nagai to participate in a midnight Mass. In the cathedral, Takashi was impressed by the people in prayer, their singing, their faith and the sermon. He would later say: "I felt somebody close to me whom I did not still know."

The next night, Sadakichi's daughter Midori was struck down by acute appendicitis. Nagai made a quick diagnosis, telephoned the surgeon at the hospital and carried Midori there on his back through the snow. The operation was successful and Midori survived.

In January 1933, Takashi began his military service with the 11th Infantry Regiment of Hiroshima. In Manchuria, Nagai cared for the wounded and served in the sanitary service as a medic. He was strongly shaken in his faith in Japanese culture and in the value of science and progress when he saw for himself the exactions of the Japanese soldiers and their brutality towards the Chinese civilian population. While serving in Manchuria, Nagai had received a Catholic Catechism as a gift from his to-be wife Midori. The book immediately raised concerns with his commanding sergeant, who had it examined for "subversive ideas." Though his sergeant found the Catechism to make no sense to him, he determined that it was not "particularly socialist," returning the book to Nagai.

Upon his return from Manchuria, he continued his reading of the Catholic catechism, the Bible, and the Pensées. He met with a priest, Fr Matsusaburo Moriyama, whose father had been deported to Tsuwano (Shimane Prefecture) for his faith, along with many other Christian villagers in Urakami, by the Government of Meiji Japan from the 1860s to the 1870s (Urakami Yoban Kuzure). Eventually, Nagai's spiritual progress took a decisive turn when he thought about Pascal's words:

"There is enough light for those who only desire to see, and enough obscurity for those who have a contrary disposition."

=== Conversion to Catholicism ===
On 12 June 1934, Nagai received baptism in the Catholic faith. He chose the Christian first name Paul and in August of the same year he married Midori Marina Moriyama. Midori was president of the association of the women of the Urakami district. Takashi became a member of the Society of Saint Vincent de Paul (SSVDP), discovered its founder, Frédéric Ozanam, and his writings, and visited his patients and the poor, to whom he brought assistance, comfort and food. From 1931 to 1936, Father Maximilian Kolbe lived in a suburb of Nagasaki, where he started a monastery. Takashi met Kolbe through involvement with his parish St. Vincent de Paul Society in Nagasaki. In April 1935 the first son of Takashi and Midori Nagai, Makoto, was born.

=== Military service ===
On 7 July 1937, after the breakout of the Second Sino-Japanese War he was mobilized as a surgeon in the service in the Medical Corps of the 5th Division. He was affected by the harsh winter in China, and the distress of the civilians and soldiers, both Chinese and Japanese. During his stay in China, their second child, Ikuko, was born (October 1937) and died (July 1938). On 4 February 1939, he received news of the death of his father and that of his daughter Ikuko. He remained in China until 1940. Upon his return, he continued his work and research at the college.

=== World War II ===
After the Japanese declaration of war on the United States on 8 December 1941, Nagai had a somber presentiment: His city could be destroyed during this war. In August of the same year and in 1943, their third and fourth children, respectively Kayano and Sasano, were born. In 1944 Sasano died.

He obtained his doctorate in 1944. On 26 April 1945, an air raid on Nagasaki left numerous victims. The hospital was overwhelmed. Takashi spent his days and nights serving the wounded in his radiology department. In June 1945, he was diagnosed with leukemia and given a life expectancy of three years. This disease was due to his exposure to X-rays during radiological examinations which he performed by direct observation, since films were not available during the war period. He spoke to Midori about his disease, and she only said to Nagai, "Whether you live or die, it is for God's glory."

In the evening of 6 August, Nagai learned that a massive bomb had been dropped by the Americans on Hiroshima but they were not aware yet that it was an atomic bomb. With Midori, he decided to take their children Makoto and Kayano away to Matsuyama, 6 km away in the countryside, accompanied by Midori's mother.

=== Relief activities ===
On 9 August 1945, at 11:02 am, the second atomic bomb struck Nagasaki. At the time of the atomic bombing, Dr. Nagai was working in the radiology department of Nagasaki Medical College Hospital. He received a serious injury that severed his right temporal artery but joined the rest of the surviving medical staff in dedicating themselves to treating the atomic bomb victims. He wrote a 100-page medical report about his observations detailing the "concentric circles of death" around the epicentre of the blast.

On 11 August, he found his house destroyed and his wife dead. Months later, Nagai was found to be seriously affected by his head wound. He was confined to bed for a month, with death for a time seeming close as he began suffering from Cheyne–Stokes respiration. According to Nagai, when he drank water taken from Lourdes in Honkawachi, where Fr. Kolbe had founded a monastery, he heard a voice urge him to ask an intercession from the priest.

=== Postwar years ===
He returned to the district of Urakami (the epicenter of the bomb) on 15 October 1945 and built a small hut (about six tatami) from pieces of his old house. He remained there with his children (Makoto and Kayano), his mother-in-law, and two other relatives.

In 1947, the local Society of Saint Vincent de Paul (SSVDP) built a simple two-tatami teahouse-like structure for him. Nagai named it "Nyokodo" (如己堂, Nyoko-dō to, literally "As-Yourself Hall", after Jesus' words, "Love your neighbor as yourself." He styled it as a hermitage and spent his remaining years in prayer and contemplation.

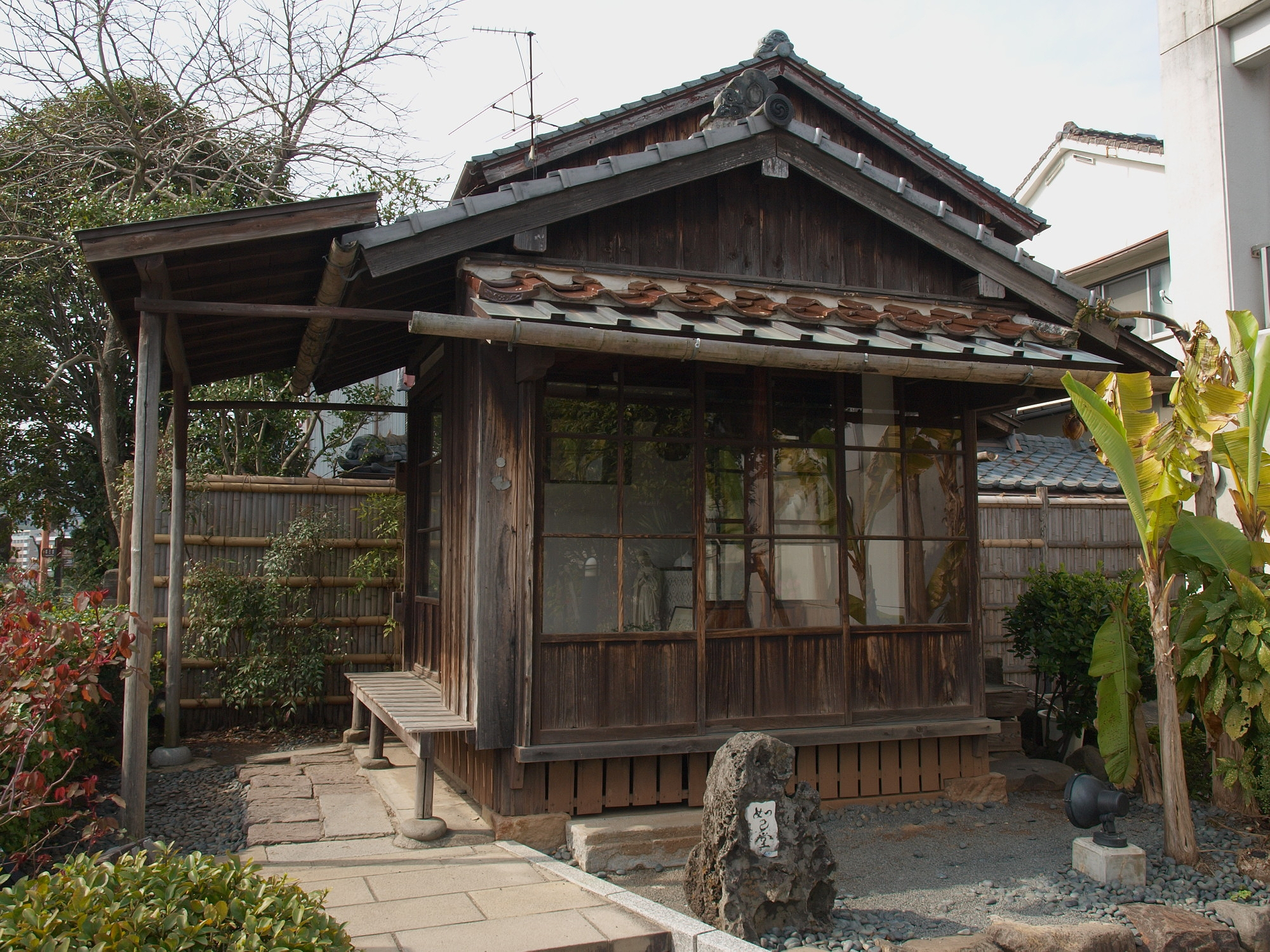
Nyoko-do Hermitage, Nagasaki

For six months, he observed mourning for Midori and let his beard and hair grow. On 23 November 1945, a mass was celebrated, in front of the ruins of the cathedral, for the victims of the bomb. Takashi gave a speech filled with faith, comparing the victims to a sacred offering to obtain peace.

In the following years, Nagai resumed teaching and began to write books. The first of these, The Bells of Nagasaki, was completed by the first anniversary of the bombing. Although he failed to find a publisher at first, eventually it became a best seller and the basis for a top box-office movie in Japan. In July 1946, he collapsed on a station platform. Now disabled, he was henceforth confined to bed.

In 1948, he used 50,000 yen paid by the Kyushu Times to plant 1,000 three-year-old sakura (cherry) trees in the district of Urakami to transform this devastated land into a "Hill of Flowers". Although some have been replaced, these cherry trees are still called "Nagai Senbonzakura" ("1,000 cherry trees of Nagai"); their flowers decorate the houses of Urakami in spring. By 2010, the numbers of these cherry trees were reduced to only about 20 due to aging and other causes.

On 3 December 1949, he was made freeman of the city of Nagasaki. He received a visit from Helen Keller in October 1948. He was visited, in 1949, by Emperor Hirohito and by Cardinal Norman Gilroy of Australia, a papal emissary.

Nagai became increasingly famous in Nagasaki for his testimony of faith and hope, to the extent that hundreds of people daily started visiting him at Nyokodo. He was already address to as "the saint of Urakami".

=== Death ===
On 1 May 1951, he asked to be transported to the college hospital in Nagasaki so that the medical students could observe the last moments of a man preparing to die from leukemia. He prolonged the day of hospitalization to wait for the statue of Our Lady, a gift from the Italian Catholic Medical Association.

Until the evening, his condition seemed stable. Around 9:40 pm, however, Nagai complained of dizziness and became unconscious. After two injections of cardiotonics, he regained his consciousness and prayed: "Jesus, Mary, Joseph, into your hands, I entrust my soul."

Then he took the cross from the hand of his son Makoto, who rushed into the room, and shortly after he shouted the words "Please pray!" Nagai died at 9:50 pm at the age of 43. On the following day, his body underwent an autopsy at the hospital according to his will. His spleen had swollen to 3,410g (normal weight: 94g), and his liver weighed 5,035g (normal weight: 1,400g).

On May 3, his funeral Mass was celebrated by Bishop Paul Aijirō Yamaguchi in front of the cathedral. On May 14, an official ceremony took place in memory of Nagai. An estimated 20,000 people attended. The city of Nagasaki observed one minute of silence while the bells of all the religious buildings and the sirens of factories rang. His remains were interred in the Sakamoto International Cemetery.

== Personal life ==
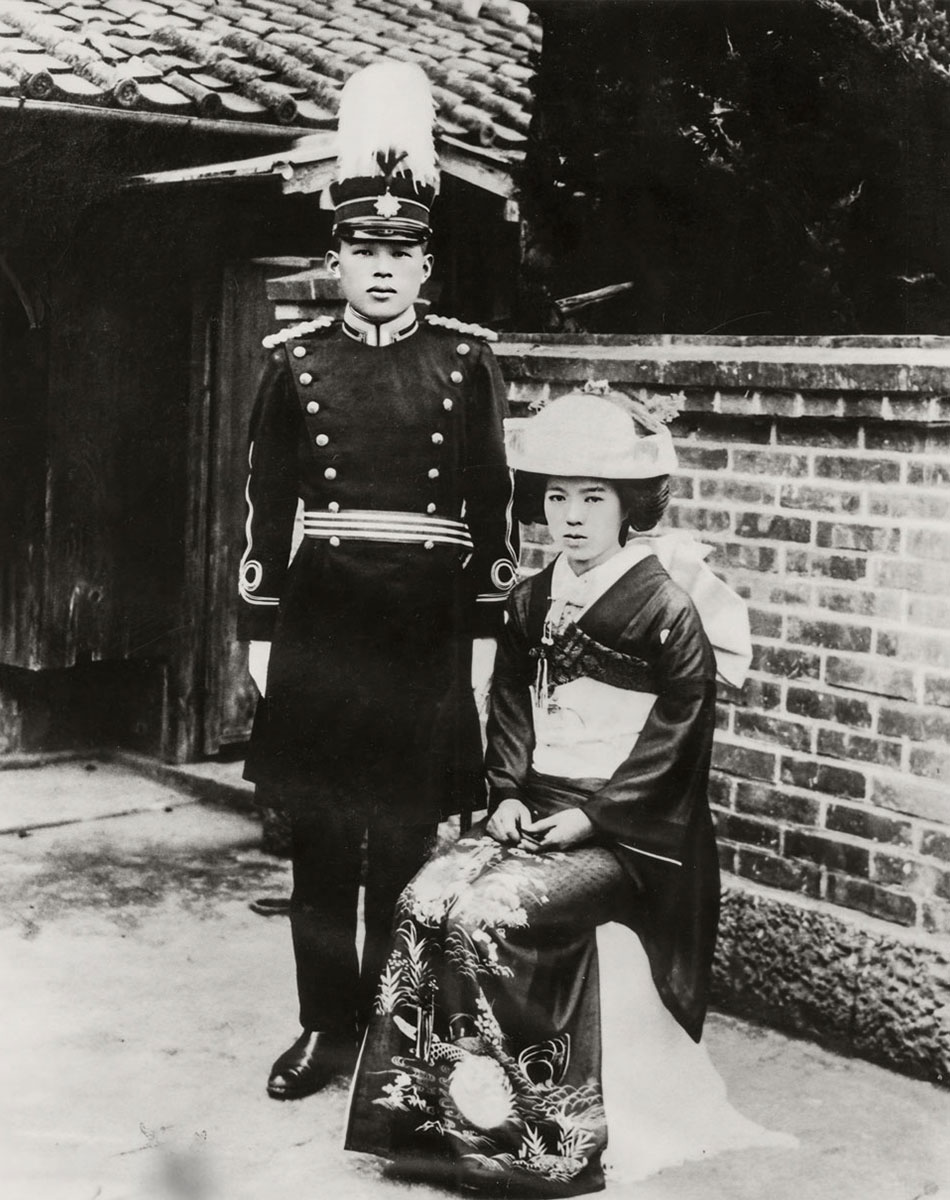
Marriage portrait of Takashi and Midori Nagai, August 1934.

In 1934, Nagai proposed to Midori Moriyama. They married in August and had four children: a boy, Makoto (誠, born 3 April 1935 – 4 April 2001), and three daughters, Ikuko (郁子, born 7 July 1937 – 1939), Sasano who died shortly after her birth, and Kayano (佳也乃, born 18 August 1941 – 2 February 2008).

== Legacy ==
His "Nyokodo", with the addition of a library, became a museum in 1952: the Nagasaki City Nagai Takashi Memorial Museum. After undergoing restoration in 2000, it is managed today by Tokusaburo Nagai, the grandson of Takashi Nagai and son of Makoto Nagai.

The Dr. Takashi Nagai Memorial Museum is in Unnan, Shimane Prefecture, where he spent his childhood.

His name was added to the Monument to the X-ray and Radium Martyrs of All Nations erected in Hamburg, Germany.

In 1991 in Nagasaki, the Takashi Nagai Peace Award was founded, with the purpose of annually awarding individuals and/or organizations, both domestic and overseas, for their contributions to world peace through the improvements and developments of medicare for hibakusha and related social welfare.

On April 1, 2003, for the succession of Nagai's spirit and a center to offer medical care for domestic and overseas hibakusha, the Nagai Takashi Memorial International Hibakusha Medical Center was founded at Nagasaki University Hospital.

Shunichi Yamashita, the director of the center, who was appointed as an adviser to Fukushima Prefecture on radiation exposure after the Fukushima nuclear accident, wrote:

"I myself [am] just a younger alumnus of the same university, I found Nagai Takashi Memorial International Hibakusha Medical Center at Nagasaki University Hospital. Furthermore, by founding the Takashi Nagai Memorial Nagasaki Peace Award as an international activity of Nagasaki Association for Hibakushas' Medical Care, I am making an effort in order to honor the doctor for a long time succeeding the last wishes of those who [know] the doctor like the late Soshino Hisamatsu, the director of [the] nursing service department."

In Korea in 2004, the Most Rev. Paul Ri Moun-hi, then Archbishop of Daegu, founded the Korean Association of "Love Your Neighbor as Yourself".

=== Beatification ===
Nagai's cause for canonization was opened after his death, together with his wife Midori, granting them the title Servant of God. An organisation in Rome called Amici di Takashi e Midori Nagai was established to promote their cause.

== Thought ==
=== Use of nuclear power ===
Although Nagai opposed the use of nuclear weapons, he hoped atomic energy might be used for peaceful purposes. At the end of the Atomic Bomb Rescue and Relief Report, he writes:

"We should utilize the principle of the atomic bomb. Go forward in the research of atomic energy contributing to the progress of civilization. A misfortune will then be transformed to good fortune. The world civilization will change with the utilization of atomic energy. If a new and fortunate world can be made, the souls of so many victims will rest in peace."

== Works ==
Nagai left behind a voluminous output of essays, memoirs, drawings, and calligraphy on themes including God, war, death, medicine, and orphanhood. These enjoyed a large readership during the American occupation of Japan (1945–52) as spiritual chronicles of the atomic bomb experience. His books have been translated into various languages, including Chinese, Korean, French, and German. Four of his literary works are currently available in English: We of Nagasaki, a compilation of atomic-bomb victim testimonies edited by Nagai; The Bells of Nagasaki (trans. William Johnston); Leaving My Beloved Children Behind (trans. Maurice M. Tatsuoka and Tsuneyoshi Takai); and Thoughts from Nykodo (trans. Gabriele di Comite). His works were republished in new Japanese editions by Paulist Press.

Much of Nagai's writing is spiritual, consisting of Christian reflections on the experience (or, just as often, imagined future experience) of himself and the people around him, especially his children, in the aftermath of the war. His intensely personal meditations are often addressed to his children or to God, and he works out his own spiritual issues on the page as he writes in a visceral and uncensored prose. Nagai's more technical writings, in the Atomic Bomb Rescue and Relief Report (Nagasaki Idai Genshi Bakudan Kyuugo Houkoku), were discovered in 1970.

== Bibliography ==
=== Writing ===
- The Bells of Nagasaki (長崎の鐘 Nagasaki no Kane), August 1946.
- Records of the Atomic Wasteland (原子野録音 Genshiya Rokuon), a series in the Japanese journal "The Knights of the Immaculata" (聖母の騎士 Seibo no Kishi), 1947–1951.
- For That Which Passeth Not Away (亡びぬものを Horobinu Mono O), 1948.
- The Rosary Chain (ロザリオの鎖 Rozario no Kazari), 1948.
- Leaving These Children Behind (この子を残して Kono Ko o Nokoshite), 1948.
- The River of Life - The Stories of Radiation Disease (生命の河-原子病の話 Seimei no Kawa- Genshibyō no Hanashi), 1948.
- The Flower-Blooming Hill (花咲く丘 Hana Saku Oka), 1949.
- My Precious Child (いとし子よ Itoshi Ko Yo), 1949.
- The Otome Pass (乙女峠, Otometōge), 1951.
- Nyokodō Essays (如己堂随筆 Nyokodō Zuihitsu), 1957.
- Village Doctor (村医 Son-i), 1978.
- Tower of Peace (平和塔 Heiwa no Tō), 1979.
- Flowers of Nagasaki (長崎の花 Nagasaki no Hana), Daily Tokyo Times series, 1950.

NOTE: Dates of publication do not reflect the order in which the works were written; some were published posthumously, and all have been subsequently re-compiled for the Paulist editions.

- The New Morning (新しき朝 Atarashiki Asa), 1999.
- Atomic Bomb Rescue and Relief Report (長崎医大原子爆弾救護報告Nagasaki Idai Genshi Bakudan Kyuugo Houkoku) Nagasaki Association for Hibakusha's Medical Care (NASHIM)

=== Translation ===
- (世界と肉体とスミス神父 Sekai to Nikutai to Sumisu Shinpu) Original Title: The World, the Flesh, and Father Smith by Bruce Marshall
- (野鼠―フアンタジイ Nonezumi - Fantaji)

=== Editing and Writing ===
- Living Beneath the Atomic Cloud: The Testimony of the Children of Nagasaki. (原子雲の下に生きて Genshigumo no Shita ni Ikite)
- We of Nagasaki; The story of survivors in an atomic wasteland (私達は長崎にいた: 原爆生存者の叫び Watashitachi wa Nagasaki ni Ita: Genbaku Seizonsha no Sakebi)

=== Unpublished Writing ===
A Bright Port (輝やく港 Kagayaku Minato)

- An Introduction of Takashi Nagai's Kagayaku Minato（A Bright Port） from the Original Manuscript (Part1)
- An Introduction of Takashi Nagai's Kagayaku Minato （A Bright Port） from the Original Manuscript (Part 2)

== Media ==
In July 1949 a song titled "Nagasaki no Kane" ("The Bells of Nagasaki") was released by Columbia Records. It was sung by Ichiro Fujiyama with lyrics by Hachiro Sato. Yuji Koseki was the composer for the song.

Nagai's "The Bells of Nagasaki" was used as the basis for a film of the same name produced by Shochiku movie studios and directed by Hideo Ōba. It was released on 23 September 1950. Leaving These Children Behind was filmed by Keisuke Kinoshita in 1983.

The British film production company Pixel Revolution Films released the film All That Remains based on the life of Nagai in 2016. The film is directed by Ian and Dominic Higgins and stars Leo Ashizawa as Dr. Nagai and Yuna Shin as his wife, Midori.

== See also ==
- Congregation for the Causes of Saints

== Sources ==
- Glynn, Paul (1988). A Song for Nagasaki. The Catholic Book Club.
- Kataoka, Yakichi(片岡 弥吉). The life of Nagai Takashi(永井隆の生涯). San Paolo, 1961; ISBN 4-8056-6400-2
- Makoto, Nagai(永井 誠一）). Nagai Takashi – The Radiologist Directly Hit by the A-bomb in Nagasaki(永井隆-原爆に直撃された放射線専門医師). Tokyo: San Paolo, 2000. ISBN 978-4-8056-6407-0
