= The Bells of Nagasaki (film) =

Nagasaki no Kane
- The Bells of Nagasaki
- Directed by: Hideo Ōba
- Written by: Takashi Nagai
- Starring: Masao Wakahara; Yumeji Tsukioka; Keiko Tsushima; Osamu Takizawa; Kōji Mitsui
- Cinematography: Toshio Ubukata
- Edited by: Kaneto Shindō; Sekiro Mitsuhata; Sugako Hashida
- Music by: Yuji Koseki
- Distributed by: Shochiku
- Release date: September 23, 1950
- Running time: 94 minutes
- Country: Japan
- Language: Japanese

The Bells of Nagasaki is a 1950 film adaptation of the 1949 book of the same name by Takashi Nagai. It was directed by Hideo Ōba and was released September 23, 1950.

== Plot ==
The film portrays the experiences of Takashi Nagai as a survivor of the atomic bombing of Nagasaki.

== Cast ==
- Masao Wakahara as Takashi Nagai
- Yumeji Tsukioka as Midori Nagai
- Keiko Tsushima as Sachiko Yamada
- Osamu Takizawa as Professor Asakura
- Kōji Mitsui as Yamashita

== Production ==
The film was heavily censored.

== Theme song ==
The theme song "The Bells of Nagasaki" by Yuji Koseki proved immensely popular.
