= Kōji Mitsui =

Japanese actor (1910–1979)

- Kōji Mitsui in The Bad Sleep Well
- Born: Hikohide Mitsui (三井日子秀); 6 March 1910; Yokohama, Japan
- Died: 20 April 1979 (aged 69); Kamakura, Japan
- Other names: Hideo Mitsui (三井秀男); 慈秀院法弘日正居士 (posthumous name)
- Occupation: Actor
- Years active: 1925–1978
- Spouses: Fusako Maki, actress (divorced); Shinobu Omori, former Takarazuka Revue member under stage name Yae Haruyo (m. 1945)
- Children: 1

Kōji Mitsui (三井弘次, Mitsui Kōji; 6 March 1910 – 20 April 1979) was a Japanese actor. He appeared in more than 150 films from 1925 to 1975, including 29 of Kinema Junpo’s annual Top-10 winners and three of its 10 best Japanese films of all time. In 2000 the magazine named him one of the 60 most important Japanese actors of the 20th century.

== Career ==
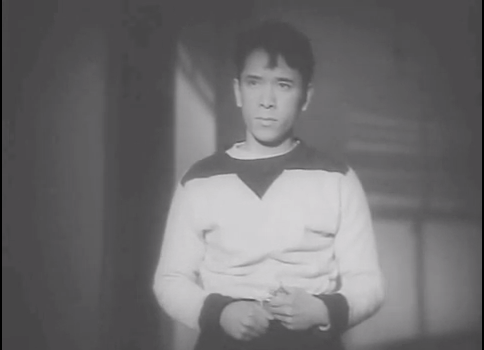
Kōji Mitsui (as Hideo Mitsui) in Dragnet Girl.

Mitsui was born Hikohide Mitsui in Yokohama, where his father managed a Shochiku movie theater. He joined the studio in 1924 while a student at the Keio School of Commerce and Industry, making his film debut in 1925 under the stage name Hideo Mitsui (三井秀男). His short stature, soft features, and expressive face and voice suited him for rebellious “younger brother” roles, and he appeared as a youth lead in many silent and early sound films, notably in several Yasujirō Ozu classics and the “Yota” series, about the antics of a trio of young idlers that also included Akio Isono and Shōzaburō Abe.

Mitsui left Shochiku in 1935 to help found the independent studio Tokyo Hassei (Sound), which was largely staffed by talent who had left Shochiku to bring prestige to the new talkie phenomenon. After the studio folded into Toho in 1941, Mitsui returned to Shochiku, where he spent the remaining war years making films and traveling with other studio stars to stage morale-boosting performances, the final of which, in Ōmihachiman, starred Mitsui, his then-wife Fusako Maki, Shin Saburi, Chishū Ryū, and Reikichi Kawamura, all of whom heard of Japan's surrender on the radio before the play began. In 1948 he changed his stage name to Kōji Mitsui (三井弘次) and transitioned into the character roles that would define his primary legacy. He joined other Shochiku performers in 1954 to create the Madoka (Picture-Perfect) Group, a film production company intended to provide stability to the lives of actors. In 1964 he was associated with the Ningen Production Company established by actor Hiroyuki Nagato.

Like many popular character actors of post-war Japan, Mitsui occasionally headlined minor films but most often shone in key supporting parts. In 1957, Akira Kurosawa borrowed Mitsui from Shochiku to play the pivotal role of Yoshisaburo the gambler in The Lower Depths, whose final line in the film—annoyed that the suicide of one of the characters has ruined their party—is “always shocking, always devastating when viewed,” and Mitsui's delivery, which breaks the fourth wall, is “absolutely on target: ironic, cruel, funny, horrible.” Kurosawa subsequently borrowed Mitsui (who had appeared in a small part in the director's 1950 Shochiku film Scandal) for five more of his Toho films.

Mitsui often played showy drunken scenes, notably in Kurosawa's Red Beard (1965). Life sometimes imitated art; confronted by director Kaneto Shindo over smelling of alcohol during a scene in which he was supposed to act drunk, Mitsui said, "What's the difference between doing what you say and really doing it?" (Shindo recalled that Mitsui would continue to taunt him with the question whenever they met, including the last time he saw the actor, at a 1975 remembrance for Yasujirō Ozu.) At the voting for the 1956 Blue Ribbon Awards, Mitsui lost a tie-breaking vote for Best Supporting Actor to his I Will Buy You costar Jun Tatara because of concerns among voters about his on-set behavior. Mitsui was reportedly chastened by the experience and resolved not to drink anymore while performing; he won the award the following year and began the most fruitful and highest-profile period of his career.

Nonetheless, as recounted in books by Shindo and critic Seiichi Yano, his drinking continued. Notoriously, Mitsui was the actor (unnamed in Stuart Galbraith IV’s The Emperor and the Wolf) who drunkenly called Kurosawa a “coward” at his home for not wanting to make any more movies following the failure of 1970's Dodes'ka-den (in which Mitsui had a cameo). That night, following the visit which also included fellow Kurosawa friend and regular Kamatari Fujiwara and their wives, the director tried to commit suicide; upon learning the news the next day while appearing on a live television program, a horrified and visibly-shaken Mitsui rushed to Kurosawa's side. While some accounts claim that a guilt-ridden Mitsui blamed himself and had to be reassured by Fujiwara that Kurosawa had been more broadly depressed about Japan's film industry, a stricken Mitsui told the Tokyo Shimbun in its reporting on the incident that the remark wasn't spoken insultingly but rather as a plea of encouragement, and that Kurosawa had reacted cheerfully and was "burning with enthusiasm" for an upcoming project.

Apart from his informal wartime performances, Mitsui did not appear onstage professionally until 1964, when he was asked to co-star in two prestige productions at the Toho Geijutsuza (Art Theater), which was located in the studio's Tokyo office building. His other artistic endeavors included creating brushed ink sketches of popular co-stars such as Hideko Takamine that were published in entertainment magazines.

In 1971, Mitsui underwent gastric ulcer surgery, further affecting a film career that had slowed by the late 1960s. In poor health throughout the 1970's, he primarily appeared on television programs, notably starring as the family patriarch in the 1969-70 season of the popular Fuji TV drama Oyome-san (Bride). Dispirited by the diminishing effect that television had on film production at Shochiku, which at one time had been nicknamed "House of Mitsui" due to his commitment and influence (and as a joking reference to the famous Japanese family to which he bore no relation), he sold his longtime home near the Ōfuna studio and moved his second wife, former Takarazuka Revue actress Shinobu Omori, and the daughter they had adopted to another part of Kamakura.

Mitsui had performed on more than 100 television shows by the time he played his final role in 1978, on the TV Asahi adaptation of the manga series Haguregumo. When he died of heart failure in 1979, among the survivors were his younger brothers Naomaro Mitsui, a noted artist and associate of the poet Makoto Tsuji, and Tadao Mitsui, a renowned anatomist who had studied as a Fulbright scholar at the University of Washington and served as the president of the Japanese Association of Anatomists from 1975 to 1982.

== Honors ==
In 1957 Mitsui won the Mainichi Film Award for Best Supporting Actor for The Lower Depths as well as his performances in two films directed by Minoru Shibuya, Kichigai buraku (The Unbalanced Wheel) and Seigiha (Righteousness).

That year he also won the Blue Ribbon Award for Best Supporting Actor for The Lower Depths and Kichigai buraku. With these two awards for The Lower Depths, Mitsui was able to distinguish himself among the top performers in Japanese cinema, whom Kurosawa had selected and dress-rehearsed on-set for 60 days to create the ultimate acting ensemble.

On May 24, 1960, Mitsui was the subject of the Asahi Shimbun Interview, an honor reserved for notable members of the arts, sports, political, and business communities.

A 1962 English-language feature article on Mitsui in the Honolulu Star-Bulletin called him "[o]ne of Japan's top 'villains' in motion pictures." He acknowledged 1957 as "a great year in my 37 years as a movie actor."

In 1993, Mitsui was named one of the 50 all-time greatest Japanese actors in a film-industry survey conducted and published by Bungei Shunjū magazine.

In 2000, Kinema Junpo designated Mitsui as one of the top 60 Japanese male stars of the 20th century as determined by a committee of 74 critics, writers, and journalists.

Mitsui was one of the actors commemorated in Seven Supporting Characters, a 2008 film festival held at the now-defunct Cinema Artone in Tokyo's Shimokitazawa entertainment district.

== Distinctions ==
Mitsui was a voice actor in Japan's first sound cartoon, Chikara to Onna no Yo no Naka (1933; now lost), and appeared in both Japan's first color film, Carmen Comes Home (1951), and first color television series, Ashita Koso (Tomorrow) (1968–69).

A star of Ozu's 1934 original silent version of A Story of Floating Weeds, he was stunt-cast in the director's own widely acclaimed 1959 color remake, Floating Weeds, which Roger Ebert named as one of the ten greatest films of all time.

Mitsui was featured as a seppuku second in footage pulled from pre-war jidaigeki films that was edited into Frank Capra's World War II propaganda film Know Your Enemy: Japan (1945).

In addition to his many performances for prominent directors such as Kurosawa, Ozu, Kobayashi, and Kinoshita, Mitsui is best known to Western audiences as the duplicitous village elder in Hiroshi Teshigahara's Oscar-nominated Woman in the Dunes (1964), for which he received above-the-title billing on the original film poster along with stars Eiji Okada and Kyōko Kishida.

== Legacy ==
The "always effectively weaselly Kōji Mitsui" received an onscreen credit in the trailer for the first film in Kobayashi's The Human Condition trilogy.

Mitsui's portrayal of the lazy nihilist in The Lower Depths is remembered as a showcase for his improvisational talents and his “oboe-like,” “beautiful voice with its unique charm and sense of rhythm.” The film's final act becomes a tour de force for Mitsui, who mockingly impersonates Bokuzen Hidari (whose character's humanistic influence has been defeated by the gambler's cynicism), leads the remaining denizens in song, and ends the film with his brutal remark. According to frequent co-star Kyōko Kagawa, he was “fabulous” in the film and “great in any role.” Contemporary film reviewers continue to discover Mitsui as “an incredible actor with no sense of fear [whose gambler] is a visceral treat. He is real and relaxed, with no sense of pride or regret.”

Mitsui's largest part for Kurosawa after The Lower Depths was the lead journalist who comments on the wedding reception that opens The Bad Sleep Well (1960); his role as a sarcastic observer was noted by Kurosawa scholar Donald Richie to parallel traits of Yoshisaburo the gambler in the prior film, and Mitsui's “particularly enthralling” performance helped to associate his legacy with sardonic characters as well as boozy ones.

In her 1976 memoir My Professional Diary, Hideko Takamine recalled working with the 23-year-old Mitsui as a child actress on a 1933 "Yota" film, remembering him as "petite, sharp-eyed, and rather quirky. [He] left an impression on me, [and] since then, for more than 40 years, I have been watching [him] obsessively." She referred to him as "Ibushi Gin," a term of respect for distinguished elder actors likening them to rich, oxidized silver.

Kaneto Shindo's 1980 book People I Met includes a chapter remembering Mitsui and the skillful acting style he had developed since childhood. According to Shindo, Mitsui was able to emanate an aura of personality even when motionless, both onscreen and off.

A portrait of Mitsui was featured in Postwar Focus 293: The Brightness of Dreams [Dream Shine], a 1983 retrospective of works by the noted photojournalist Jun Yoshida.

A 1995 issue of the Bungeishunjū monthly No Side commemorating Japan's great postwar actors included a full-page essay by the writer Midori Nakano celebrating the familiar clear-eyed urban attitude of the characters Mitsui played for Kurosawa, particularly his role in The Lower Depths. In 2005 she reiterated the point, writing in the publisher's Bungei Shunjū magazine, "I don't know about foreigners, but if you're Japanese, you surely recognize his type."

In 2000, the rakugo star and film critic Shiraku Tatekawa named Mitsui one the top three Japanese actors of the 20th century, calling him "addictive," "haunting," and "unforgettable."

At a 2017 event, the actor Tatsuya Nakadai stated that during the filming of Kurosawa's 1963 High and Low, he felt added pressure having to deliver a 10-minute monologue because Mitsui was in the scene. The two also appeared onscreen together in Kobayashi's The Human Condition (1959) and The Inheritance (1962), as well as Okamoto's Battle of Okinawa (1971); in 1975, Nakadai appeared in a stage production of Gorky's The Lower Depths as the gambler character who was closely associated in Japan with Mitsui's portrayal in Kurosawa's 1957 film version.

In media coverage of the 2017-2018 TV Tokyo reality series “The Supporting Actors,“ which featured six popular character actors living together, the stars repeatedly cited Kōji Mitsui as a major influence and an example of a distinctive and superlative member of their profession.

The November 15, 2022 installment of the cat-oriented manga Mon-chan and Me, published in Fusosha's popular webzine Joshi Spa! (Women's Spa!), featured several panels with a guest character designed as a caricature of Mitsui. The January 24, 2023 installment featured him again, as robbery suspect "Shūji Mitsui," derived from blending the kanji characters from the actor's two professional first names, Hideo (秀男) and Kōji (弘次), to create "秀次," literally "Hidetsugu" but more popularly a representation of "Shūji."

In his February 19, 2024 "Cigarette Burn“ column posted in the webzine Kemur, author Daisuke Kodama called Kōji Mitsui the quintessential "Shōwa smoker" due to his deftness with match-lighting and blowing of smoke rings in the film Floating Weeds.

The actor Hirotarō Honda spoke of his admiration for Mitsui during an event hosted by director Tatsuoki Hosono in February 2026.

== Partial filmography ==
Film
Year	Title	Director	Role	Notes
1932	No Blood Relation	Mikio Naruse	Sake delivery cyclist	Silent; as Hideo Mitsui (uncredited)
1933	Chikara to Onna no Yo no Naka	Kenzō Masaoka	Voice	First Japanese sound cartoon (lost); as Hideo Mitsui
1933	Dragnet Girl	Yasujirō Ozu	Hiroshi	Silent; as Hideo Mitsui
1934	Street Without End	Mikio Naruse	Café patron	Silent; as Hideo Mitsui
1934	A Story of Floating Weeds	Yasujirō Ozu	Shinkichi	Silent; as Hideo Mitsui
1934	A Mother Should Be Loved	Yasujirō Ozu	Kosaku	Silent; as Hideo Mitsui
1935	A Hero Of Tokyo	Hiroshi Shimizu	Hideo Nemoto	as Hideo Mitsui
1938	Children of the Sun	Yutaka Abe	Okubo	as Hideo Mitsui
1940	Urban Torrent	Kōjirō Sasaki	Kirō	as Hideo Mitsui
1946	The Elegant Vagabond	Masahiro Makino	Gentarō	as Hideo Mitsui
1950	The Bells of Nagasaki	Hideo Ōba	Yamashita	
1951	Carmen Comes Home	Keisuke Kinoshita	Oka	First Japanese color film
1952	General Pork Chop	Yuzo Kawashima	Gintsuki	
1955	The Vassal's Neck	Daisuke Itō	Izari	
1956	I Will Buy You	Masaki Kobayashi	Tamekichi Kurita	
1956	Early Spring	Yasujirō Ozu	Hirayama	
1957	The Lower Depths	Akira Kurosawa	Yoshisaburo (the gambler)	Mainichi, Blue Ribbon awards (best supporting actor)
1957	The Unbalanced Wheel	Minoru Shibuya	Sukeo Aoki	Mainichi, Blue Ribbon awards (best supporting actor)
1957	Righteousness	Minoru Shibuya	Aoki	Mainichi award (best supporting actor)
1957	Times of Joy and Sorrow	Keisuke Kinoshita	Mr. Kanemaki	
1958	The Hidden Fortress	Akira Kurosawa	Pit guard	Cameo appearance
1958	Ragpicker's Angel/Maria of the Ant Village	Heinosuke Gosho	Iwa-san	
1958	Spring and Autumn in a Shabby House	Noboru Nakamura	Tabito Noro	
1959	Floating Weeds	Yasujirō Ozu	Kichinosuke	Mitsui played the youth lead in the 1934 original
1959	The Human Condition	Masaki Kobayashi	Furuya	First film in trilogy (No Greater Love)
1959	Kiku and Isamu	Tadashi Imai	Yasube	
1959	Lucky Dragon No. 5	Kaneto Shindo	Yaizu policeman	Cameo appearance
1960	The Bad Sleep Well	Akira Kurosawa	Lead journalist	
1960	Only She Knows	Osamu Takahashi	Chief Kanzaki	
1961	My Face Red in the Sunset/Killers on Parade	Masahiro Shinoda	Knife assassin	
1962	Gang vs. Gang	Teruo Ishii	Yanagisawa	
1963	High and Low	Akira Kurosawa	Journalist	Cameo appearance
1963	Legends of Showa Yakuza	Teruo Ishii	Ikegami	
1963	The Secret Sword	Hiroshi Inagaki	Senjūrō Yabe	
1964	Woman in the Dunes	Hiroshi Teshigahara	Village elder	
1965	A Fugitive from the Past	Tomu Uchida	Motojima	
1965	Red Beard	Akira Kurosawa	Heikichi	
1967	Japan's Longest Day	Kihachi Okamoto	Weeping reporter	Cameo appearance
1971	Battle of Okinawa	Kihachi Okamoto	Old man	Cameo appearance
1975	The Great Jailbreak	Teruo Ishii	Ryota	Final film role

English-language reference works frequently cite Mitsui as a performer in the film Nanami: The Inferno of First Love, but the role is played by a different actor whose name's Kanji characters (満井幸治) also translate to "Kōji Mitsui," and whose only film credit is that role.
