= List of cemeteries in Japan =

This is a list of cemeteries in Japan.

- Aoyama Cemetery, Tokyo
- Hattori Reien
- Kobe Municipal Foreign Cemetery
- Okunoin Cemetery (Mount Kōya)
- Sakamoto International Cemetery
- Tama Reien
- Yanaka Cemetery
- Yokohama Foreign General Cemetery
- Zōshigaya Cemetery

== See also ==
- Foreign cemeteries in Japan
