= The Only Son (1936 film) =

- DVD cover
- Directed by: Yasujirō Ozu
- Screenplay by: Tadao Ikeda; Masao Arata
- Story by: Yasujirō Ozu (as James Maki)
- Starring: Iida Chōko; Shinichi Himori; Masao Hayama; Yoshiko Tsubouchi
- Cinematography: Shōjirō Sugimoto
- Music by: Senji Itō
- Distributed by: Shōchiku
- Release date: 1936
- Running time: 82 minutes
- Country: Japan
- Language: Japanese

The Only Son (一人息子, Hitori musuko) is a 1936 Japanese film directed by Yasujirō Ozu, starring Chōko Iida and Shin'ichi Himori. The film was Ozu's first sound film feature.

== Plot ==
The film starts in the rural town of Shinshū in 1923. A widow, Tsune (O-Tsune) Nonomiya (Chōko Iida), works hard at a silk production factory to provide for her only son, Ryōsuke. When Ryōsuke's teacher Ōkubo (Chishū Ryū) persuades her to let her son continue to middle school, she decides to support her son's education despite her poverty. Her son promises to become a great man.

Thirteen years later, in 1936, O-Tsune visits Ryōsuke (Shin'ichi Himori) in Tokyo. She learns that her son, now a night school teacher, has married and has a son. Her daughter-in-law, Sugiko, is nice and obliging, but Ryōsuke's job does not pay much. Ryosuke and O-Tsune visit Ōkubo, who is now a father of four and running a tonkatsu restaurant.

The couple keeps the mother entertained but their money is running out. On a trip to an industrial district one day, Ryōsuke confides in his mother that he wishes he had never come to Tokyo because it is difficult to succeed there and he feels like a disappointment to his mother. O-Tsune chides her son for giving up, telling him she has given up everything to see him succeed.

Sugiko sells her kimono and raises enough money for the whole family to go out to enjoy themselves. However, Tomibo (Tomio Aoki), a neighbor's son, gets injured by a horse and Ryōsuke rushes him to the hospital. He gives their money to Tomibo's mother to pay the hospital bill. O-Tsune later praises Ryōsuke for his selfless act.

O-Tsune eventually returns to Shinshu, but leaves some money for her grandson. Ryōsuke tells his wife that he will obtain a teaching certificate. Back at Shinshū, O-Tsune tells a friend at the factory that her son has become a "great man", but she privately laments her situation.

== Cast ==
- Choko Iida as Tsune Nonomiya
- Himori Shin'ichi as her son, Ryosuke
- Masao Hayama as young Ryosuke
- Yoshiko Tsubouchi as Sugiko
- Chishū Ryū as Okubo-sensei, Ryosuke's teacher
- Tomoko Naniwa as Okubo's wife
- Bakudan Kozo (Jun Yokoyama) as their son
- Mitsuko Yoshikawa as Otaka, Ryosuke's neighbour
- Tokkan Kozo (Tomio Aoki) as her son, Tomibo
- Eiko Takamatsu as Oshige

== Reception ==
Roger Ebert inducted The Only Son into his Great Movies section, writing of its direction, "I really do feel as if Ozu is looking at his films along with me. He isn't throwing them up on the screen for me to see by myself. Together we look at people trying to please, and often failing, and sometimes redeeming." Richard Brody of The New Yorker argued, "Ozu watches with his own stifled fury, as modernity uproots both the best and the worst aspects of tradition."

== Home media ==
In 2010, the BFI released a Region 2 DVD of the film as a bonus feature on its Dual Format Edition (Blu-ray + DVD) of Late Spring.

A Region 1 DVD featuring The Only Son along with Ozu's There Was a Father was released by The Criterion Collection on July 13, 2010. The release included video interviews with film Scholars Tadao Sato, David Bordwell, and Kristin Thompson. Also included was a booklet featuring the essay The Only Son: Japan, 1936 by Tony Rayns.
