= Shunichi Yamashita =

Japanese medical scientist

Shun'ichi Yamashita
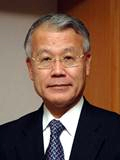
- in Tokyo on January 13, 2012
- Born: 1952 (age 73–74); Nagasaki City, Nagasaki, Japan
- Occupation: medical doctor

Shun'ichi Yamashita (山下 俊一, Yamashita Shun'ichi; born 1952) is a Japanese medical scientist serving as dean and professor at the Graduate School of Biomedical Sciences at Nagasaki University.

== Personal background ==
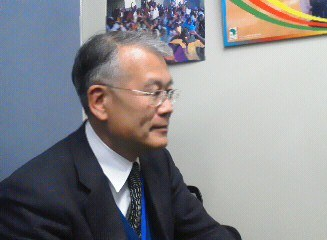
in Tokyo on January 13, 2012

Shin'ichi Yamashita was born in Nagasaki City, Nagasaki Prefecture, in 1952. His mother was a hibakusha who survived the atomic bomb dropped in Nagasaki on August 9, 1945. He is a descendant of Kakure Kirishitans in Urakami (present Nagasaki City) who kept their faith clandestinely more than 200 years under severe persecution from the Tokugawa Shogunate. Yamashita himself is Catholic and belongs to Shiroyama Catholic Church in the Archdiocese of Nagasaki. He is a member of the Japan Catholic Doctor Association and serves as president of its branch in Nagasaki.

From his childhood, Yamashita respected Albert Schweitzer and Dr. Takashi Nagai. His mottos are "Reverence for life" and "Love thy neighbor as thyself". According to an interview by the Asahi Shimbun, his respect for Dr. Takashi Nagai (the author of The Bell of Nagasaki) encouraged him to become a medical doctor. At first, Yamashita was attracted to tropical medicine because he respected Hideyo Noguchi. He received his education at St. Mary's Elementary and Junior High School run by the Augustinian order from the attached kindergarten to junior high school. Yamashita later studied at Nagasaki Prefectural Nagasaki Kita High School.

Yamashita graduated from the faculty of medicine at Nagasaki University in 1978. He finished a doctoral course at the graduate school of the same university in 1984. With the support of Dr. Shigenobu Nagataki, he studied at Cedars-Sinai Medical Center at UCLA in the United States from 1984 to 1987. After going back to Japan, Yamashita worked under Dr. Nagataki. He earned a doctoral degree in medicine in 1989 and was installed as a professor of the faculty of medicine at Nagasaki University in the following year. Later, he was installed as a president of the Nagai Takashi Memorial International Hibakusha Medical Center.

== Awards ==
- 1985 The U.S. Los Angeles Research Fellowship Award
- 1986 Investigator Award from American College of Physicians
- 1986 Research Fund from American College of Diabetics
- 1990 The Third Nordisk Growth Hormone Investigator Award
- 1991 Investigator Award by Kudo Academic Foundation
- 2011 The Asahi Cancer Award

== Scientific papers ==
- Glucose Stimulation of Protooncogene Expression and Deoxyribonucleic Acid Synthesis in Rat Islet Cell Line

== Medical research in Chernobyl ==
From 1991 onward, Yamashita participated in a health research project supported by the Nippon Foundation. He visited the affected Chernobyl area 100 times. According to Yamashita, the communication with the children whose age was the same as his own, and their mothers, made him feel as if the area was next to Nagasaki. He eventually concluded the effects of radiation in the area as follows: "Apart from the dramatic increase in thyroid cancer incidence among those exposed to radiation at a young age, there is no clearly demonstrated increase in the incidence of solid cancers or leukemia due to radiation in the most affected populations".

== Efforts to reduce radiation exposure in medical treatment ==
Before the nuclear crisis in Fukushima, Yamashita showed his concern about the radiation dosage to which young people were exposed. In The Journal of Japan Physicians Association, he writes: "Mainly for the people less than twenty-years-old, if they are exposed to excessive radiation between 10 and 100mSV, the risk of carcinogenesis is undeniable".

The other report written with other scientists points out, "the lowest doses of X-rays for which reasonably reliable evidence of increased cancer risk exists range from 10 to 50mGy".

== Relationship with the Catholic church ==
Being Catholic, Yamashita has been involved with activities held in the Catholic Church. For example, when the first general assembly of the Conference of Japan Catholic Medical Care Associations was held in Nagasaki from October 23 to October 24, 2009, Yamashita said, "As Hiroshima and Nagasaki are the only cities in the world that were afflicted with A-bombings, both can claim the moral high ground on A-bomb elimination. No one can deny their claims and international diplomatic endeavors on behalf of peace free of nuclear weapons. U.N. General Assembly President Miguel d'Escoto referred to this right when he visited Japan last summer."

Even after his appointment to risk management advisor to Fukushima Prefecture, the Church's attitude toward the professor remains unchanged. In Saitama Diocese, the diocesan Committee for Justice and Peace led by Sadato Yabuki, a diocesan deacon and professor emeritus at Gunma University, invited Yamashita to lecture on radiation at the cathedral on May 7, 2011. Later, In the name of Bishop Marcelious Daiji Tani, leaflets based on the lecture were printed in six languages and distributed in the diocese and shelters.

When he was installed as a vice-president of Fukushima Medical University, the diocesan newsletter called Yoki Otozure (Good Visit) in the Nagasaki Archdiocese reported this event. In November, a symposium, "Radiation Exposure" Which Causes New Damages was held at the Diocesan Catholic Center, he participated as one of the symposiasts.

== Relationship with Soka Gakkai ==
From August 8 to August 10, 2010, Soka University Peace Research Institute had a research study in Nagasaki, and Yamashita lectured the participants. On May 24, 2011, Yamashita was invited by the Komeito Party's election campaign office of Koriyama City, Fukuhsima Prefecture and lectured there.

== Activities after Fukushima Daiichi nuclear disaster ==
After the Fukushima I nuclear accidents, Yamashita and Prof. Noboru Takamura were asked by Fukushima Prefecture governor Yuhei Sato, on March 19, 2011, to serve as radiation risk management advisers to the prefecture. The letter of appointment as special professor to the president at Fukushima Medical University was given on April 1 of the same year.

As a radiation risk management adviser, Yamashita lectured on radiation mainly in Fukushima Prefecture. He claims that radiation exposure of 100 mSv/yr is safe.

In an interview with the Fukushima Minyu Shimbun, a local newspaper of the prefecture, Yamashita said, "When people are exposed to radiation doses of 100mSV or more at a time, the possibility of getting cancer increases one out of every ten-thousand people" and said of the radiation dose that "It is equivalent to the radiation dose of receiving 10 times of CT scan one time. But CT scan is necessary for medication, so CT scan itself is not bad".

On March 19, 2011, Yamashita visited the prefectural government's disaster headquarters and said, "Information about radiation risks has not been correctly communicated. Under the current levels, administering iodine pills is unnecessary."

Meanwhile, as the president of the Japan Thyroid Association, Yamashita wrote a letter dated March 24, 2011 to its members that thyroid blockage was not necessary, citing the opinion of the Japanese Society of Nuclear Medicine. However, in the affected areas like Iitate, Soma and Minami-Soma, high radiation doses required people to take iodine pills for thyroid blockage by the standard of Japan (100mSV) and WTO (10mSV) was widely detected according to the SPEEDI map released to the public on March 24, 2011.

In April, Yamashita become a member of the committee for disputes of nuclear liability by Ministry of Education, Culture, Sports, Science and Technology.

In reaction to the lectures by Yamashita, the citizen group collected signatures for his dismissal from the position of advisor.

Due to his optimistic statements on radiation exposure in a series of lectures, Yamashita earned nicknames such as "Mr. 100mSV" and "Damashita" (who tricked). Some even compare him with Josef Mengele.

Receiving criticism and repellence from people in Fukushima, he stated "leaving or staying Fukushima needs determination." He explained the meaning of determination as "I do not deny over-protection, but parents shall let their children face difficulties: to judge properly by themselves in times of stress. It is to tell the risk and profit in a gray area with no answer of 〇 and X. Sailing to the ocean without any chart is the meaning of determination". He concluded the situation as "It is an endurance contest between me and people in Fukushima".

Takashi Hirose, writer and anti-nuke activist with Shojiro Akashi, made accusations of criminal negligence against executives of TEPCO and affiliated people including Yamashita in July 2011.

From September 11 to September 12, 2011, by the support of the Nippon Foundation, an International Expert Symposium in Fukushima —Radiation and Health Risks – was held and Yamashita was one of the participants.

Yamashita's words have gotten attention from overseas. In August, Der Spiegel interviewed the professor and asked questions about his statements. In October 2011, at the German TV-channel ZDF, one of the public channels, Yamashita's comments on radiation were broadcast.

On March 11, 2012, the one-year anniversary of the 2011 Tōhoku earthquake and tsunami, Yamashita spoke to the students, faculty and staff at Khalifa University, UAE.

On June 12, more than 1,300 people in Fukushima filed complaints and accused 33 people, including Yamashita.

In February 2013, Yamashita informed Nature by email that he would quit his post as the head of Fukushima prefecture's massive survey at the end of March. Yamashita was chosen to be the tenth Warren K. Sinclair Keynote Speaker at the 49th Annual Meeting of the NCRP to be held March 11 and 12, 2013.

== See also ==
- Atomic bombings of Hiroshima and Nagasaki
- Takashi Nagai
- Nippon Foundation
- Chernobyl disaster
- Thyroid neoplasm
