= Sumiko Mizukubo =

Japanese actress (born 1916)

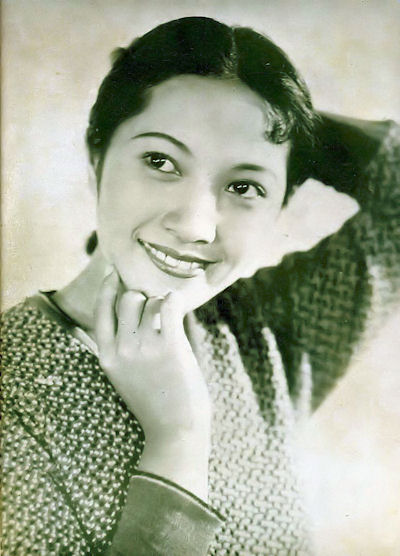
- Born: Tatsuko Ogino; October 10, 1916; Meguro Village, Ebara County, Tokyo Prefecture, Japan (now Meguro-ku, Tokyo, Japan)
- Other name: Mimi
- Occupations: Film actress; stage actress; dancer
- Years active: 1932–1935
- Known for: opera - drama -contemporary drama - period drama - silent film- talkie

Sumiko Mizukubo (水久保 澄子, Mizukubo Sumiko; born Tatsuko Ogino (荻野 辰子, Ogino Tatsuko) October 10, 1916, date of death unknown) was a Japanese actress and dancer known for her roles in theatrical revue and in the Japanese cinema, primarily during the era of silent film of the early 1930s, where at the height of her fame she was billed as the Japanese Sylvia Sidney.

== Life and career ==
Mizukubo was born in Meguro Village, Ebara County, Tokyo Prefecture (present day Meguro-ku, Tokyo, Japan). Her sister Kiyoko Tagawa (田川 清子) was a dancer.

She attended the Senzoku High School for Girls |ja|洗足学園第一高等学校, before training at the revue and musical theatre company of Shochiku alongside other future film actors such as Yumeko Aizome and Kimiyo Otsuka. Mizukubo acted at the Shochiku Kamata Studio and the Nikkatsu Tamagawa studios,

Mizukubo made her film debut in 1932 appeared in 39 movies as a young star, including films directed by Naruse Mikio and Ozu Yasujiro. She quit film-acting in 1935, but continued to dance and appear in stage roles with the Yoshimoto Kogyo.

== Filmography ==
Year	Title
1932	Mushiabamera hara (Eroding Spring) - as Kasumi, third daughter
1932	Chocolate Doll as Mieko
1932	Koi no Tokyo''
1932	Riku no Wikodo
1932	Sei Naru Chibusa
1932	Tsubakihime
1932	Arashi no naka no shojo
1932	Kagayake nippon josei
1933	Hanayome no negoto' as waitress
1933	Apart from You as Shokiku
1933	Dragnet Girl as Kakuko
1933	'Juku no haru
1933	Yotamono to Kyakusenbi
1933	Kunisada Chuji: Ruro ruten no maki
1933	Koi no Shohai
1933	Iro wa nioedo
1933	A Man with a Married Woman's Hairdo as Toshiko Kajihara
1933	Tokyo ondo as Sumiko Shimura
1933	Daigaku no waadanna - younger sister Miyako
1933	Jogakusei to yotamono as Kazuko Kitajima
1933	Rappa to musume
1933	Namida no Wataridori
1933	Hatsukoi no haru
1933	Aru haha no sugata
1934	Genkan-ban to ojosan
1934	Sakura ondo
1934	Wakafufu shiken bekkyo
1934	Shingetsu katsuragawa
1934	Geisha sandaiki showahen
1934	Onna to umare ta kara nya
1934	Tsukigata hanpeita
1934	Musume san nin kangeki jidai
1934	Gantō no shojo
1934	Guren tai no uta
1935	Watashi ga oyome ni itta nara (wife in "Salaryman nomaki")
1935	Mittsu no shinju as Syako Kuzuryu
1935	Nichizo getsuzō kyōdō eiga
1935	Kaikoku dai Nippon Nikkatsu
