= The Lower Depths (1957 film) =

1957 Japanese drama film

- Theatrical release poster
- Directed by: Akira Kurosawa
- Screenplay by: Hideo Oguni; Akira Kurosawa
- Based on: The Lower Depths by Maxim Gorky
- Produced by: Akira Kurosawa
- Starring: Toshiro Mifune; Isuzu Yamada; Kyōko Kagawa; Ganjiro Nakamura
- Cinematography: Ichio Yamazaki
- Edited by: Akira Kurosawa (uncredited)
- Music by: Masaru Sato
- Production company: Toho
- Distributed by: Toho
- Release date: 17 September 1957 (Japan)
- Running time: 124 minutes
- Country: Japan
- Language: Japanese

The Lower Depths (どん底, Donzoko) is a 1957 Japanese film directed, produced, and edited by Akira Kurosawa, who co-wrote the screenplay with Hideo Oguni based on the 1902 play The Lower Depths by Maxim Gorky. The setting was changed for the film from late 19th-century Russia to Edo period Japan.

== Plot ==
In a run-down Edo tenement, an elderly man and his bitter wife rent out rooms and beds to the poor. The tenants are gamblers, prostitutes, petty thieves and drunk layabouts, all struggling to survive. The landlady’s younger sister who helps the landlords with maintenance, brings in an old man and rents him a bed. Kahei, who dresses as a Buddhist pilgrim, quickly assumes the role of a mediator and grandfatherly figure, though there is an air of mystery about him, and some of the tenants suspect his past is not unblemished.

Sutekichi, thief and self-appointed tenement leader, is having an affair with Osugi the landlady, though he is gradually shifting his attention to her sweet-tempered sister. Okayo thinks little of him, however, which frustrates Sutekichi and sours his relationship with Osugi. Jealous and vengeful, Osugi seeks to persuade Sutekichi to murder her husband so she can turn him over to the authorities. Sutekichi sees through her plot and refuses to take any part in the murder. The husband discovers the affair, gets into a fight with Sutekichi, and is saved only through Kahei’s intervention.

Slowly, Okayo begins to see the good in Sutekichi and warms to his advances. Rokubei and Osugi beat Okayo, prompting the tenants to break into their house to save her. Sutekichi is enraged to learn how Okayo was treated and, in the ensuing chaos, accidentally kills Rokubei, and is then blamed by Osugi for her husband's death. Rather than defend himself, the enraged Sutekichi claims that she had goaded him into doing it. Okayo now believes that they have used her to provide an excuse for the killing. She will now have nothing to do with Sutekichi. Kahei, whose testimony could potentially have cleared him, runs away to avoid having to testify, adding substance to the suspicions that he had something to hide. Sutekichi and Osugi are arrested.

Other subplots, some of a comic nature, involve the occupants of the tenement: a nihilistic gambler who rejects the pilgrim's hopeful entreaties to the other denizens; an aging actor who has lost his ability to memorize lines; a craftsman who appears indifferent to the impending death of his ailing wife, yet becomes a broken man when she finally dies; a destitute who claims to be descended from a samurai family, only to have this claim refuted; and a group of partying drunks who seem to rejoice in the face of misfortune.

== Cast ==
Actor	Role
Toshiro Mifune	Sutekichi (the thief)
Isuzu Yamada	Osugi (the landlady)
Kyōko Kagawa	Okayo (Osugi's sister)
Nakamura Ganjirō II	Rokubei (Osugi's husband)
Kōji Mitsui	Yoshisaburo (the gambler)
Kamatari Fujiwara	Danjuro (the actor)
Bokuzen Hidari	Kahei (the pilgrim)
Minoru Chiaki	Tonosama (the ex-samurai)
Eijirō Tōno	Tomekichi (the tinker)
Akemi Negishi	Osen (the prostitute)
Haruo Tanaka	Tatsu (the cooper)
Atsushi Watanabe	Kuna (the wrestler's associate)
Yū Fujiki	Unokichi (the cobbler)
Kichijirō Ueda	Shimazo (the police agent)
Eiko Miyoshi	Asa (Tomekichi's wife)
Nijiko Kiyokawa	Otaki (the candy seller)
Fujitayama	Tsugaru (the wrestler)
Takeshi Katō	guardhouse official (uncredited)

== Production ==
Kurosawa assembled his cast from among the top performers in Japanese cinema, dress-rehearsing them on-set for 60 days and shooting extended takes with multiple cameras to create a theatrical effect. Although the set was purposefully filthy, Kurosawa walked on it only in his indoor shoes, to the surprise of cast and crew; he explained that dirty though it was, it was still "home" to his characters.

== Themes ==
The film explores the Nietzschean theme that Buddhism (and religiousness in general) verges on nihilism by presenting two archetypal characters, the pilgrim and the gambler, who share a contentment that contrasts with the self-conscious existentialism of the other characters. The pilgrim’s grace derives from believing that nothing on Earth matters because rewards are found in the afterlife; the gambler also believes nothing matters, but rather because he rejects religion and morality, seeking pleasure from life rather than purpose. Because both belief systems reject earthly matters and result in contentment, philosophers sometimes link Buddhism with nihilism; in Kurosawa’s plot arc, the nihilistic gambler succeeds in outlasting the pilgrim, whose promises are unfulfilled and result in a character’s suicide, which the gambler mocks. This fatalistic tone contrasts with Kurosawa’s more humanistic approach in other films, and is regarded as a reason for the film's mixed response upon its release in Japan. In addition, such overt representation of downtrodden, hopeless characters (albeit from a different era) was rare in early post-occupation Japan's popular media, which attempted to downplay allusions to an underclass struggling with societal changes wrought by the war and its aftermath.

== Release ==
The Lower Depths received a roadshow theatrical release on September 17, 1957 by Toho. It received general release in Japan on 1 October 1957.

The film was released by Brandon Films with English subtitles in the United States on 9 February 1962.

== Awards ==
Isuzu Yamada won Kinema Junpo's award for Best Actress of the Year (for this film, Downtown, and Throne of Blood).

Toshiro Mifune won the Mainichi Film Concours Best Actor award (also for Downtown).

Kōji Mitsui won both the Blue Ribbon Award and Mainichi Film Concours awards for Best Supporting Actor (also for The Unbalanced Wheel).

== Reception ==
In 2009 the film was voted at No. 36 on the list of The Greatest Japanese Films of All Time by Japanese film magazine Kinema Junpo.

The Lower Depths has an 83% rating on Rotten Tomatoes, based on six critics' opinions.

== See also ==
- The Lower Depths, Jean Renoir's 1936 French film, also based on the play.
- Souls on the Road, a 1921 Japanese film directed by Minoru Murata based on the same play.
