= Yumeko Aizome =

Japanese actress (born 1915)

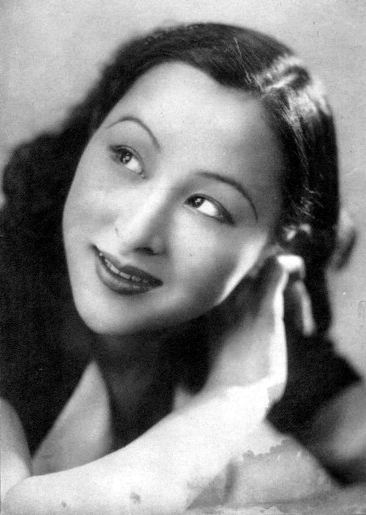
- Born: Yachiyo Yokoyama; December 25, 1915; Inawashiro, Fukushima, Empire of Japan
- Occupations: Japanese cinema actress; stage performer
- Years active: 1930–1955, 1965
- Spouse: Masanori Yusa (m. 1942–1975)
- Children: 1

Yumeko Aizome (逢初 夢子, Aizome Yumeko; born December 25, 1915, date of death unknown) was a Japanese film and stage actress. She was active from 1930 until 1965 and appeared in more than 115 films.

== Early life ==
Aizome was born as Yachiyo Yokoyama (横山 八千代, Yokoyama Yachiyo) in Inawashiro, Fukushima. Aizome's father died when she was 6 months old, and her mother died when she was 10 years old. After losing both parents, Aizome gave her possessions to her uncle and went to Tokyo with her older brother, where she went to elementary school.

== Career ==
In July 1930, Aizome dropped out of high school to join the Shochiku Kagekidan musical theatre revue. Her first role was that of a pirate in a play titled merry-go-round. She appeared on stage until she was transferred to the Shochiku Kamata film division and made her screen debut in Mikio Naruse's 1932 film Moth-eaten Spring, now considered lost. In early 1933, Aizome appeared in Yasujirō Ozu's Dragnet Girl. She then played Masumi, a prostitute and friend of the main character in Hiroshi Shimizu's Japanese Girls at the Harbor.

In 1934, she appeared in her second and final Ozu film, A Mother Should be Loved. Aizome's breakthrough came that same year, when she starred as the title character in Yasujirō Shimazu's film Our Neighbor, Miss Yae. She had taken over the lead role from the film's intended star, Sumiko Mizukubo, who had unexpectedly departed the project during pre-production. Released on June 28, 1934, the film was a major success and established Aizome as a leading star. Bolstered by this success, Aizome and several other actors left Shochiku in September 1934 to form their own production company, Kyōdō Eiga, with distribution handled by Nikkatsu. This move prompted Shochiku to file a lawsuit against her. After Kyōdō Eiga proved unsustainable and dissolved in mid-1935, Aizome joined the Tokyo Hassei studio, where she appeared in films sporadically over the next three years.

Her film career regained momentum when she joined Shinkō Kinema in early 1938 and resumed making films at a prolific pace. However, in February 1939, Shinkō Kinema fired Aizome and three other actors for embarking on an unauthorized month-long promotional tour of Manchuria and Korea that resulted in missed work commitments. Following a lawsuit by the studio, a judge ordered Aizome to pay 10,000 yen in damages. Despite the dispute, Shinkō Kinema reinstated her by the end of the year, and in 1940 alone she appeared in 14 films. In 1947, she played the sister of Setsuko Hara's character in A Ball at the Anjo House. She retired from acting in 1955, but in 1965 made one more film appearance in Yoji Yamada's Kiri no Hata.

In 1985, Aizome was interviewed along with her Our Neighbor, Miss Yae co-star Sanae Takasugi. She was last heard from in 2002, when she provided source material for a book on Japanese modernist film.

== Personal life ==
Aizome began a relationship with professional swimmer Masanori Yusa after they were first introduced by her cousin, a schoolmate of Yusa's, at the Japan-USA swimming match in Tokyo on August 19, 1935. Yusa proposed in early 1936, but Aizome initially declined, concerned that his family would disapprove of her profession as an actress. She accepted after Yusa assured her he would seek his mother's blessing, which newspapers reported he had obtained in May 1936.

In the weeks leading up to the 1936 Berlin Olympics, Aizome was quoted in newspapers as saying that they were planning on getting married in the foreseeable future. By the time of the Olympics however, Yusa's mother now opposed the marriage, stating "I cannot welcome an actress into the proper lineage of the Yusa family". Upon returning to Japan, Yusa reportedly skipped his own welcome-home banquet to travel to his hometown in an unsuccessful attempt to change his mother's mind. Consequently, Yusa ended the engagement, stating the marriage could not proceed without his family's approval. Following the breakup, in late October Aizome went into a period of seclusion for over two months, sending a postcard to her film studio citing illness. She resurfaced in January 1937, apologizing to her studio and continuing her career. Several years later, Aizome and Yusa reconciled and married in 1942. Her married name is Yachiyo Yusa (遊佐 八千代). Together the couple had a daughter, Makoto Yusa (born February 28, 1942), who became an actress under the name Naoko Yusa (遊佐 ナオ子).

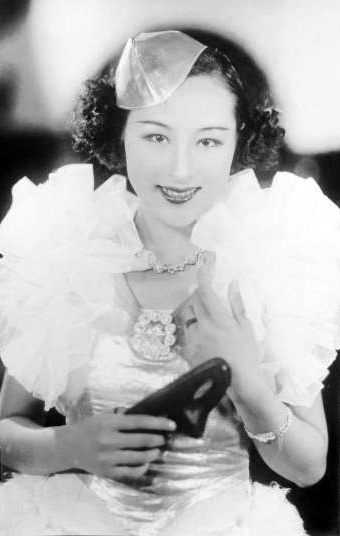

== Selected filmography ==
- Dragnet Girl (1933) - Misako
- Japanese Girls at the Harbor (1933) – Masumi
- A Mother Should Be Loved (1934) – Mitsuko
- Our Neighbor, Miss Yae (1934) – Yaeko
- A Ball at the Anjo House (1947) – Akiko Anjō
- Kiri no Hata (1965) – Yoshiko Ōtsuka
