= There Was a Father =

- Film poster
- Directed by: Yasujirō Ozu
- Written by: Tadao Ikeda; Takao Yanai; Yasujirō Ozu
- Starring: Mitsuko Mito; Chishū Ryū; Haruhiko Tsuda; Shin Saburi
- Cinematography: Yūharu Atsuta
- Edited by: Yoshiyasu Hamamura
- Music by: Kyoichi Saiki
- Distributed by: Shochiku
- Release date: April 1, 1942
- Running time: 94 minutes
- Country: Japan
- Language: Japanese

There Was a Father (Japanese: 父ありき, Hepburn: Chichi Ariki) is a 1942 Japanese film directed by Yasujirō Ozu.

== Plot summary ==
Shuhei Horikawa (Chishū Ryū) works as a mathematics school-teacher in a middle school. A widower, he has a ten-year-old son named Ryohei (Haruhiko Tsuda), who studies in the same school. While taking his class out for an excursion one day, one of his pupils drowns after running off with a classmate on a secret boat trip. Shuhei blames himself for the accident, and quits his teaching job out of remorse.

Shuhei enrolls his son to a junior high school in Ueda, where Ryohei studies as a boarder, and goes to work in Tokyo to finance his son's education.

Years pass. The twenty-five-year-old Ryohei (Shūji Sano) has finished college and has himself become a school-teacher in Akita. Shuhei now works as a clerk in a Tokyo textile factory and the two meet occasionally. Ryohei has thoughts of quitting his teaching job to join his father at Tokyo, but Shuhei rebukes him for not doing what his duty decrees. Ryohei takes a ten-day vacation to join his father in Tokyo. Together with retired headmaster Makoto Hirata (Takeshi Sakamoto), Shuhei attends a get-together with his former pupils and the group reminisce about their school days. When Shuhei returns home, he suffers a heart attack and is admitted to the hospital. Asking Hirata's daughter Fumiko (Mitsuko Mito) to take care of his son, he dies soon after. The final scene shows Ryohei and his new wife Fumiko returning to Akita, with the urn containing his father's ashes resting on the luggage rack; the two have agreed to live together with Hirata and Fumiko's younger brother.

== Cast ==
- Chishū Ryū as Shuhei
- Shūji Sano as Ryohei (as an adult)
- Haruhiko Tsuda as Ryohei (as a child)
- Shin Saburi as Yasutaro Kurokawa
- Takeshi Sakamoto as Makoto Hirata
- Mitsuko Mito as Fumi
- Shinichi Himori as Minoru Uchida
- Kōji Mitsui as alumnus

== Production ==
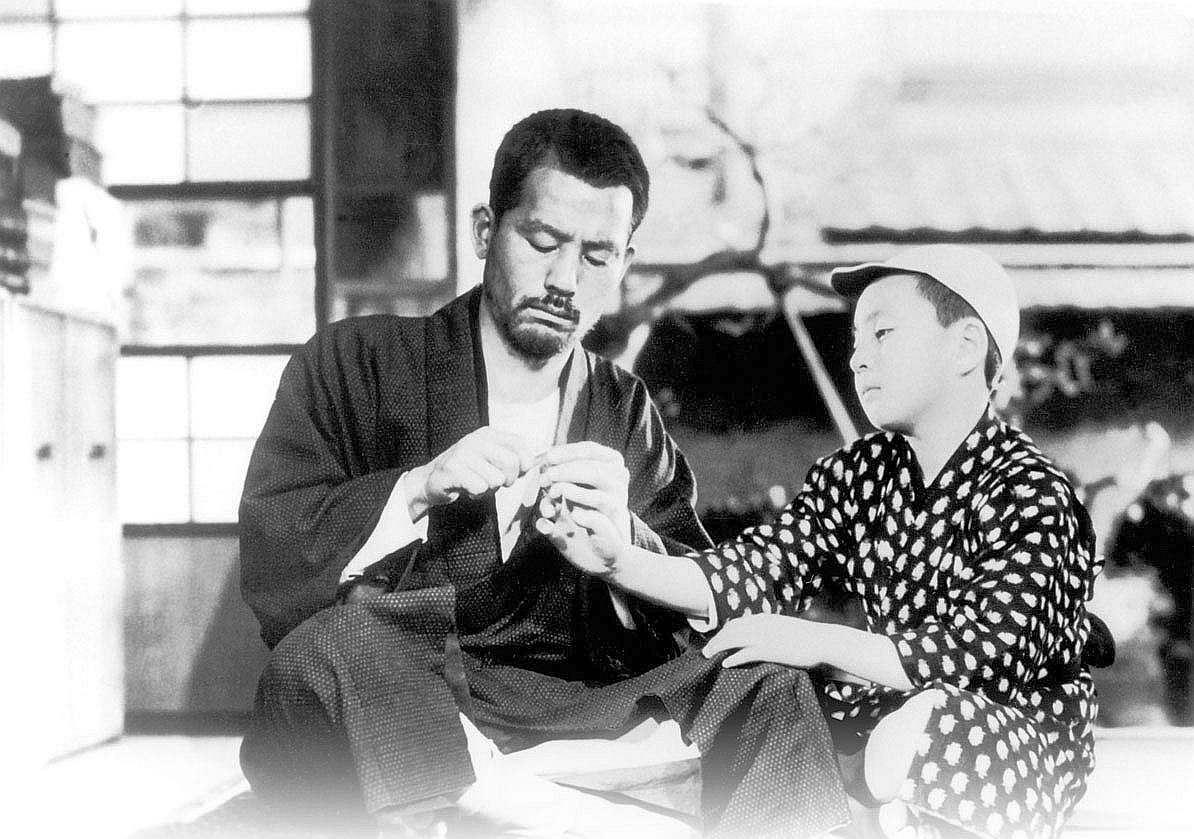
Chishū Ryū and Haruhiko Tsuda as father and son

Yasujirō Ozu wrote the first draft of There Was a Father before he went to China in 1937. On returning to Japan, he rewrote it, feeling that "it could still be improved".

== Release ==
There Was a Father was released on April 1, 1942. In 2023, scenes depicting patriotic poetry and music that had been cut from its only existing prints by occupation censors were restored for presentation of the film at the Venice Film Festival.

== Reception ==
There Was a Father placed second in the Kinema Junpo's annual critics' poll of Japan's Best Ten films. It currently has a 100% rating on Rotten Tomatoes. Trevor Johnston of Time Out praised Ryu's performance, arguing that the actor's "stoic underplaying offers a heartbreaking performance for the ages." Richard Brody of The New Yorker wrote, "In such chilling nuances as Shuhei’s silent grief, his rigid deference to authority, his joyful anticipation of Ryohei’s military service, and Ryohei’s serene lessons on the destructive power of TNT, Ozu reveals a society heading blindly toward the abyss and destroying its future in the name of the past."

== Home media ==
There Was a Father was released on DVD along with Ozu's The Only Son by The Criterion Collection on July 13, 2010.

In 2011, the BFI released a Region 2 Blu-ray and DVD of the film as a bonus feature on its Dual Format Edition (Blu-ray + DVD) of Equinox Flower.

In April 2024, the BFI released a Region 2 Blu-ray of the film in a package titled “Two Films by Yasujirō Ozu”. This single disc package also contains I Was Born, But....
