= Tadao Ikeda =

Japanese screenwriter and director

Tadao Ikeda 池田忠雄
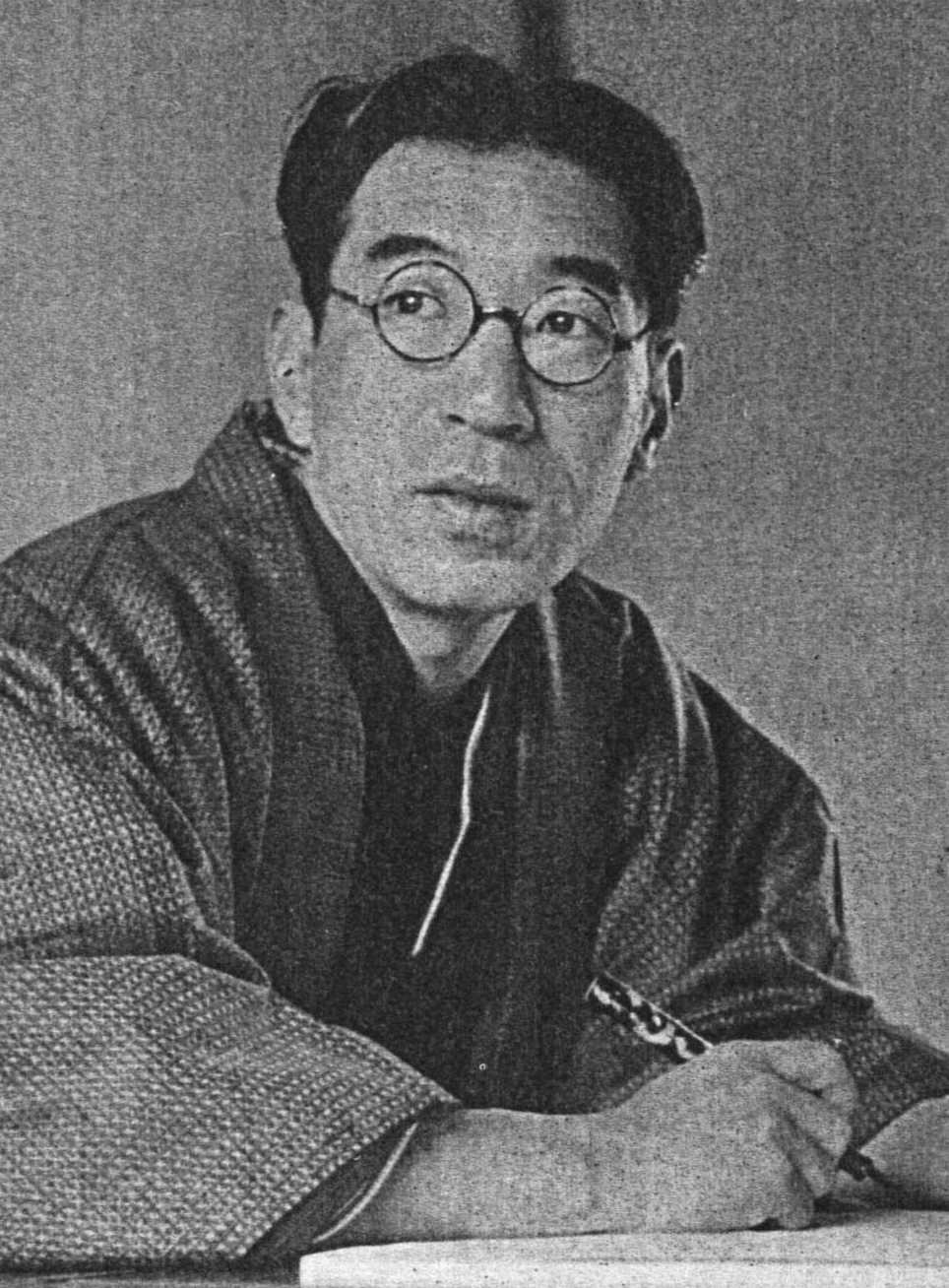
- Tadao Ikeda in 1941
- Born: 5 February 1905; Tokyo
- Died: 12 May 1964 (aged 59)
- Occupations: Screenwriter, director

Tadao Ikeda (池田忠雄, Ikeda Tadao) (5 February 1905 – 5 May 1964) was a Japanese screenwriter and film director. After graduating from Waseda University, he joined the Shochiku studio and came to prominence writing screenplays for such directors as Yasujirō Ozu, Mikio Naruse, Kōzaburō Yoshimura, and Yasujirō Shimazu. He also directed a few films.

== Selected filmography (as screenwriter) ==
Year	Japanese Title	Rōmaji	English Title	Director
1929	突貫小僧	Tokkan kozo	A Straightforward Boy	Yasujirō Ozu
1930	朗かに歩め	Hogaraka ni ayume	Walk Cheerfully	Yasujirō Ozu
1931	美人と哀愁	Bijin aishu	Beauty's Sorrows	Yasujirō Ozu
1932	春は御婦人から	Harn wa gofujin kara	Spring Comes from the Ladies	Yasujirō Ozu
1933	東京の女	Tokyo no onna	Woman of Tokyo	Yasujirō Ozu
1933	非常線の女	Hijosen no onna	Dragnet Girl	Yasujirō Ozu
1933	出来ごころ	Degigokoro	Passing Fancy	Yasujirō Ozu
1933	力と女の世の中	Chikara to Onna no Yo no Naka	The World of Power and Women	Kenzō Masaoka
1934	母を恋はずや	Haha o kowazuya	A Mother Should Be Loved	Yasujirō Ozu
1934	浮草物語	Ukigusa monogatari	A Story of Floating Weeds	Yasujirō Ozu
1935	箱入娘	Hakoiri musume	An Innocent Maid	Yasujirō Ozu
1935	東京の宿	Tokyo no yado	An Inn in Tokyo	Yasujirō Ozu
1935	子宝騒動	Kodakara sōdō	Kid Commotion	Torajiro Saito
1936	ひとり息子	Hitori musuko	The Only Son	Yasujirō Ozu
1941	戸田家の兄妹	Todake no kyodai	Brothers and Sisters of the Toda Family	Yasujirō Ozu
1942	父ありき	Chichi ariki	There Was a Father	Yasujirō Ozu
1944	陸軍	Rikugun	Army	Keisuke Kinoshita
1947	長屋紳士録	Nagaya Shinshiroku	Record of a Tenement Gentleman	Yasujirō Ozu
