= Shinichi Himori =

Japanese actor (1907–1959)

- Born: Kazuo Moriyama; 10 January 1907; Tokyo, Japan
- Died: 12 September 1959 (aged 52)
- Occupation: Actor
- Years active: 1925-1959

Shinichi Himori (日守新一, Himori Shin'ichi; 10 January 1907 – 12 September 1959), born Kazuo Moriyama (守山一雄, Moriyama Kazuo), was a Japanese film actor. He appeared in more than seventy films from 1925 to 1959.

== Career ==
Born in Tokyo, Himori entered the Shochiku studios in 1924 and, after starting out in side roles, became a leading player, particularly specializing in realistic films after the coming of sound. With his starring role in Yasujirō Ozu's The Only Son as the best example, he was often featured in films by famous directors for his earnest acting that smelled of reality. He became a by player after the war, but died of a heart attack in 1959. Shochiku honored him with a company funeral.

== Selected filmography ==
Film
Year	Title	Role	Notes
1954	Izu no odoriko		
1952	Ikiru	Kimura	
1950	Scandal		
1942	There Was a Father		
1938	The Masseurs and a Woman		
1936	The Only Son		
1931	The Neighbor's Wife and Mine		
1929	Days of Youth		
