= Dragnet Girl =

1933 film

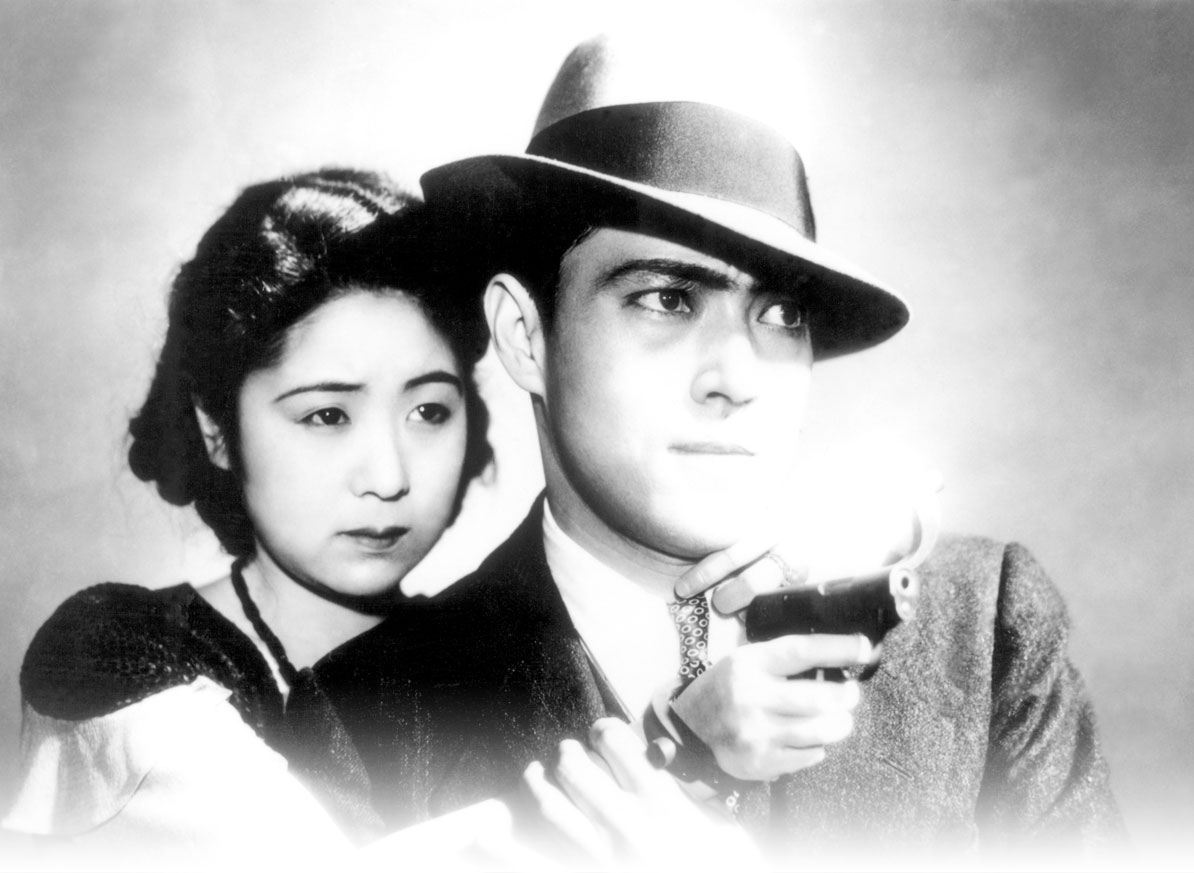
- Kinuyo Tanaka and Joji Oka in Dragnet Girl

Japanese name
- Kanji: 非常線の女
Transcriptions
- Revised Hepburn: Hijōsen no Onna
- Directed by: Yasujirō Ozu
- Screenplay by: Tadao Ikeda
- Story by: James Maki (Yasujirō Ozu)
- Starring: Kinuyo Tanaka; Joji Oka; Sumiko Mizukubo
- Cinematography: Hideo Mohara
- Edited by: Kazuo Ishikawa; Minoru Kuribayashi
- Production company: Shochiku
- Release date: 27 April 1933
- Running time: 100 minutes
- Country: Japan
- Language: Silent

Dragnet Girl (1933) by Yasujirō Ozu

Dragnet Girl (非常線の女, Hijōsen no Onna) is a 1933 Japanese silent gangster film directed by Yasujirō Ozu. Written by Tadao Ikeda, the film tells the story of a gangster and his girlfriend finding redemption through the actions of an innocent girl and her not-so-innocent brother.

== Plot ==
Tokiko (Kinuyo Tanaka) is a typist and the girlfriend of a small-time gangster, Joji (Joji Oka). A student, Hiroshi (Kōji Mitsui), joins the gang. When Joji begins to fall for Hiroshi's sister, Kazuko (Sumiko Mizukubo), Tokiko decides to scare her rival away. However, Tokiko takes a liking to Kazuko and decides to reform. Joji throws Tokiko out, but she soon returns and convinces him to give up his life of crime.

Meanwhile, Hiroshi has stolen money from the shop where his sister works. Joji and Tokiko rob Tokiko's boss and give the money to Hiroshi so that he can pay back the money he stole.

Pursued by the police, Tokiko entreats Joji to surrender. When he refuses, she shoots him. She continues to ask for his forgiveness, running to him and grabbing him into a hug as the two cry. Police officers close in as the couple embrace.

== Cast ==
- Kinuyo Tanaka as Tokiko
- Joji Oka as Joji
- Sumiko Mizukubo as Kazuko
- Kōji Mitsui as Hiroshi (credited as Hideo Mitsui)
- Yumeko Aizome as Misako
- Yoshio Takayama as Senko
- Koji Kaga as Misawa
- Yasuo Nanjo as Okazaki, the president's son
- Chishū Ryū as a policeman

== Home media ==
On 18 March 2013, the British Film Institute released the film on Region 2 DVD as part of The Gangster Films collection, along with Walk Cheerfully (1930), That Night's Wife (1930), and the surviving fragment of A Straightforward Boy (1929).

The Criterion Collection released the film for Region 1 on 21 April 2015, along with Ozu's Walk Cheerfully and That Night's Wife, as part of a DVD boxset through its Eclipse series.

== Cinematic release ==
The film was shown in a number of venues across Scotland in 2014, as part of the Hippodrome Festival of Silent Cinema, with live musical accompaniment by Jane Gardner (piano), Roddy Long (violin) and Hazel Morrison (percussion). This new score was also composed by Jane Gardner.
