= The Bells of Nagasaki =

1949 Japanese-language book by Takashi Nagai

- Cover of the 1976 Japanese edition
- Author: Takashi Nagai
- Original title: Nagasaki no Kane
- Translator: William Johnston
- Language: Japanese, English
- Genre: Non-fiction Essay
- Publisher: Kodansha International
- Publication date: January 1949
- Publication place: Japan, United States
- English publication date: 1984
- Media type: Book, Music, Film
- Pages: 118
- ISBN: 978-4-7700-1845-8

The Bells of Nagasaki (長崎の鐘, Nagasaki no Kane) is a 1949 book by Takashi Nagai. It vividly describes his experiences as a survivor of the atomic bombing of Nagasaki. It was translated into English by William Johnston. The title refers to the bells of Urakami Cathedral, of which Nagai writes:

These are the bells that did not ring for weeks or months after the disaster. May there never be a time when they do not ring! May they ring out this message of peace until the morning of the day on which the world ends.

Initially, the book was refused publication by the American forces occupying Japan, until an appendix was added describing Japanese atrocities in the Philippines. This appendix was later removed.

== Records and CDs ==
- July 1, 1949, performed by Ichiro Fujiyama, Mariko Ike, written by Hachiro Sato, composed by Yuji Koseki
- September 1949, performed by Yoshie Fujiwara, written and composed by Kazuo Uemoto
- 1996, performed by Yumi Aikawa, composed by Yuji Koseki

== Film ==
A film adaptation directed by Hideo Ōba was released September 23, 1950.

=== Modern retelling ===
In 2011, UK film Production Company Pixel Revolution Films announced plans to produce a film on the life of Dr. Nagai. Directors Ian and Dominic Higgins cited The Bells of Nagasaki (the book) as one of the main inspirations for making the film. The film is titled All That Remains and was released in 2016. It is the first Western film to deal directly with the atomic bombing of Nagasaki.

== See also ==
- Hiroshima (book)
- Hiroshima rages, Nagasaki prays
