= Midori Nakano =

Japanese columnist and essayist

Midori Nakano (中野 翠, Nakano Midori; b. Urawa, Saitama, 21 July 1946) is a Japanese columnist and essayist who has written extensively in Sunday Mainichi magazine. She is a graduate of Waseda University.

== Biography ==
Her father was a reporter for the Yomiuri Shimbun. He has had a serial essay column in the weekly magazine Sunday Mainichi since 1985, and as a film critic, he wrote a serial score sheet for Cinema Chart in Weekly Bunshun ( Bungeishunju ), alongside Shibayama Mikio and Mori Naoto (previously Shinada Yukichi and Osugi)

Midori Nakano after graduating from Saitama Prefectural Urawa First Girls' High School, she graduated from the School of Political Science and Economics at Waseda University.

She worked part-time at the Yomiuri Shimbun Publishing Bureau's Book Editorial Department, then worked at Shufu no Tomosha, and then worked as an editor for Seiyu's PR magazine Necchu Nandemo (later Seishun Hyōban), edited by Michio Akiyama, where she met Mariko Hayashi, who would become her close colleague.

She also worked as an assistant to Kikuko Miyake. Her first solo work was Utena-san, a Congratulatory Telegraph, published in 1984. In the preface to the 1990 paperback edition of Utena-san published by Shincho Bunko.
