= Yūji Koseki =

Japanese composer (1909–1989)

Yūji Koseki 古関裕而
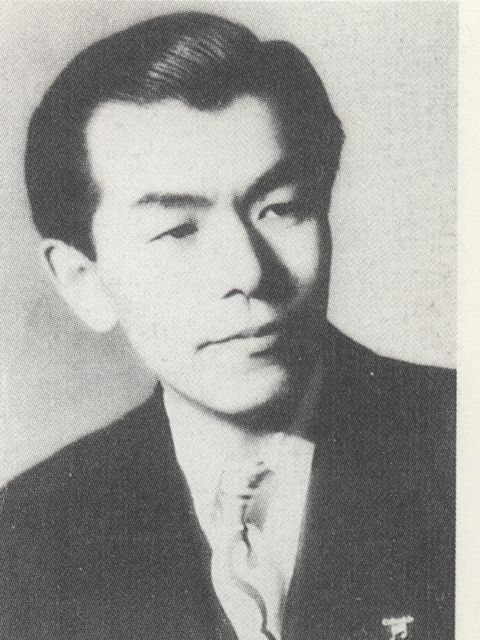

Background information
- Born: Yūji Koseki; August 11, 1909
- Origin: Fukushima City, Fukushima Prefecture, Japan
- Died: August 18, 1989 (aged 80)
- Genres: Ryūkōka, gunka, march, fight song, film score
- Occupation: Composer
- Years active: 1930–1989

Yūji Koseki (古関 裕而, Koseki Yūji; August 11, 1909 – August 18, 1989) was a Japanese ryūkōka, gunka, march, fight song and film score composer. His real name was also Yūji Koseki, but its kanji was 古關 勇治. For his contributions in music to baseball, he was inducted into the Japanese Baseball Hall of Fame in 2024.

== Career ==
Koseki entered Nippon Columbia in 1930. He composed Hanshin Tigers' song "Rokko Oroshi" in 1936 (for this, i His famous military song titled "Roei no Uta" (露営の歌, lit. "The Song of The Camp") was released in 1937. Famous songs composed by him included "The Bells of Nagasaki" and "Mothra's song". Ichiro Fujiyama sang "The Bells of Nagasaki" in 1949. "Mothra's song", sung by The Peanuts, was used in the 1961 movie Mothra. "Olympic March" in 1964. He also arranged "Olympic Hymn" for Orchestra.

== Filmography ==
Music for films:

- Momotaro's Divine Sea Warriors (1945)
- Kane no naru oka: Dai san hen, kuro no maki (1949)
- Odoroki ikka (おどろき一家) (1949)
- The Bells of Nagasaki (1950)
- A Mother's Love (1950)
- Mothra (1961)

== See also ==
- Yell (TV series), the main character is inspired by him.
