= Anatomical Science International =

- Discipline: Anatomy and morphology
- Language: English
- Edited by: Sen Takeda

Publication details
- Former name: Kaibogaku Zasshi
- History: 2002-present
- Publisher: Springer (Singapore)
- Frequency: 4/year
- Impact factor: 1.741 (2020)

Standard abbreviations
- ISO 4: Anat. Sci. Int.

Indexing
- CODEN: ASINC5
- ISSN: 1447-6959 (print); 1447-073X (web)
- LCCN: 2002243466

Links
- Journal homepage

Anatomical Science International is a peer-reviewed medical journal that covers gross, histologic, cellular, molecular, biochemical, physiological and behavioral studies of humans and experimental animals. It is the official publication of the Japanese Association of Anatomists (formerly known as Kaibogaku Zasshi).

According to the Journal Citation Reports, the journal has a 2020 impact factor of 1.741.
