= I Was Born, But... =

1932 film by Yasujirō Ozu

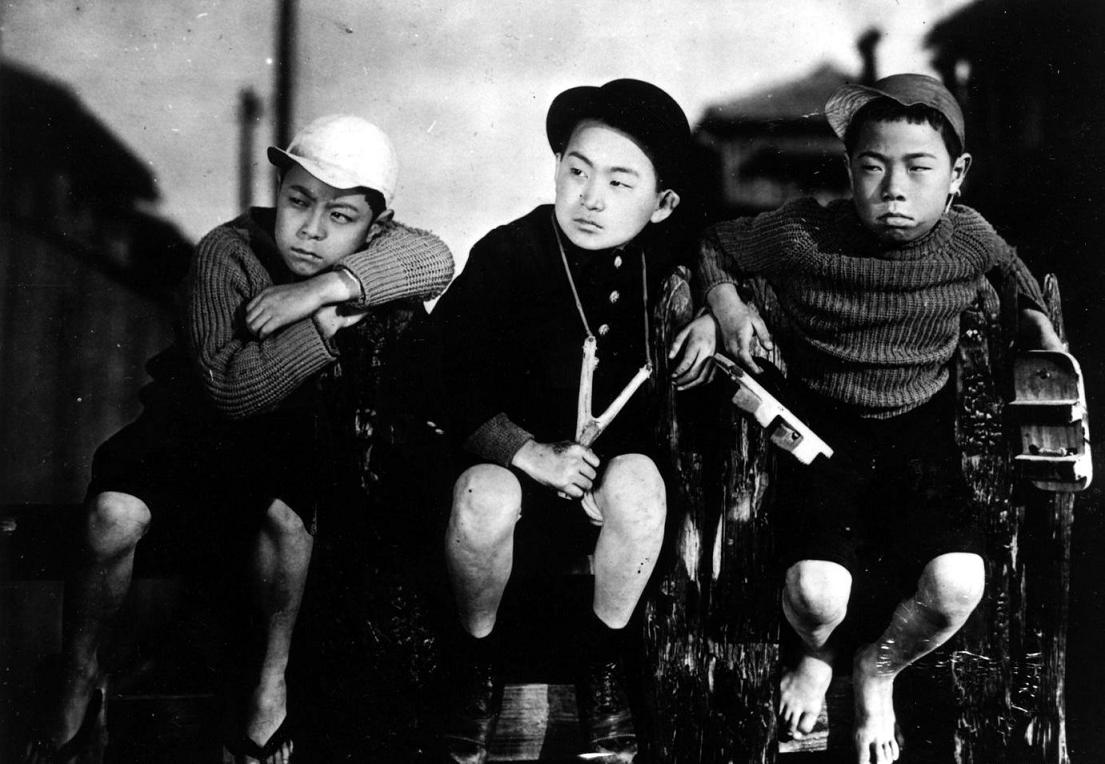
- Directed by: Yasujirō Ozu
- Screenplay by: Akira Fushimi; Geibei Ibushiya
- Story by: Yasujirō Ozu
- Starring: Tatsuo Saitō; Tomio Aoki; Mitsuko Yoshikawa; Hideo Sugawara
- Cinematography: Hideo Shigehara
- Edited by: Hideo Shigehara
- Production company: Shochiku
- Release date: 3 June 1932 (Japan)
- Running time: 90 minutes
- Country: Japan
- Languages: Silent film Japanese intertitles
- Box office: 60,219 tickets (France)

I Was Born, But... (大人の見る絵本 生れてはみたけれど, Otona no miru ehon - Umarete wa mita keredo; lit. "An Adult's Picture Book View — I Was Born, But...") is a 1932 black-and-white Japanese silent comedy film directed by Yasujirō Ozu. It was the first of six Ozu films to win the Kinema Junpo Award for Best Film of the Year. In 1959, Ozu loosely remade the film as Good Morning.

The film's story centers on two young brothers whose faith in their father, an office worker, is shaken by what they perceive as his kowtowing to the boss.

== Plot ==
The Yoshi family has just moved to the Tokyo suburbs, close to where the father Kennosuke's direct boss, Iwasaki, is staying. Kennosuke's two young sons Keiji and Ryoichi are supposed to be going to school, but owing to the threats of a group of neighborhood and school bullies, they decide to play truant. After the teacher speaks to their father, Keiji and Ryoichi have no choice but to go to school. They attempt to eat sparrow's eggs to get stronger so that they can get back at the boys, but an older delivery boy Kozou decides to help them out to threaten the bullies, and they emerge as the top dogs amongst the gang.

One of the neighborhood kids is Taro, whose father is Iwasaki himself. The boys argue amongst themselves who has the most powerful father. Not long after, they visit Taro's home, where the office workers have gathered under Iwasaki, who screens some home movies for the amusement of the gathering. The two brothers witness on film how their father, who to them is stern and whom they look up to, plays the buffoon before his colleagues and boss.

Humiliated, they go home and decide that their father isn't such an important person after all. They throw a massive tantrum, and confront their father asking him why he has to grovel under Taro's father. Kennosuke answers that Taro's father is richer and holds a higher position than he does. Dissatisfied with this answer, the two decide to hold a hunger strike. Ryoichi gets a spanking from his father, but after the children have gone to bed, the father confides in the wife that he does not enjoy doing what he does. Both wish for a better future for their children.

The next day, the children attempt a hunger strike during breakfast, but succumb to a dish of onigiri. Kennosuke manages a reconciliation with them. The children say they would like to be a lieutenant general and a general respectively. On their way to school, they see Taro's father in a car, and they urge their father to go up and greet him. As Kennosuke takes a convenient car ride to work, the brothers walk to school with Taro and the rest of the gang.

== Cast ==
- Tatsuo Saitō as Chichi
- Tomio Aoki as Keiji (Younger Son)
- Mitsuko Yoshikawa as Haha (Yoshi's Wife)
- Hideo Sugawara as Ryoichi (Older Son)
- Takeshi Sakamoto as Juuyaku (Iwasaki, Executive)
- Teruyo Hayami as Fujin (Iwasaki's Wife)
- Seiichi Kato as Kodomo (Taro)
- Shoichi Kofujita as Kozou (Delivery Boy)
- Seiji Nishimura as Sensei (Teacher)
- Zentaro Iijima, Shotaro Fujimatsu, Michio Sato, Kuniyasu Hayashi, Akio Nomura and Teruaki Ishiwatari as Asobi nakama (Friend)

== Reception ==
I Was Born, But... has a 100% rating on Rotten Tomatoes, based on 25 reviews, with a weighted average of 8.0/10. It also has a score of 91 out of 100 on Metacritic. A.O. Scott wrote: "Everything in this film is utterly believable, so much so that at times it seems almost anecdotal, a sweet little anthology of kids doing the darnedest things. That it is more — a small masterpiece, perfect in design and execution — almost goes without saying, but the film’s profundity and its charm go hand in hand." In 2009, the film was ranked at No. 59 on the list of the Greatest Japanese Films of All Time by Japanese film magazine Kinema Junpo. It ranked 183rd in the 2012 Sight & Sound critics' poll of the greatest films ever made.

Film critic Stephen Amos stated: "There is an underlining darkness in the film, one that reflects the difficulty of the time and the inevitability of disappointment – a theme which laces much of Ozu’s work." Leonard Maltin gave it three of four stars: "Amusing satire of cultural mores has a serious underside about the personal sacrifices one must make to get ahead in business and the power of peer group pressure."

== Home media ==
In 2011, the BFI released a Region 2 DVD of the film as a bonus feature on its Dual Format Edition (Blu-ray + DVD) of Good Morning.

The film is also available as part of The Criterion Collection's Eclipse series DVD box set "Silent Ozu: Three Family Comedies".

In 2017, The Criterion Collection's DVD and Blu-ray reissues of Good Morning included a remastered edition of the film, complete with new musical score.

In April 2024, the BFI released a Region 2 Blu-ray of the film in a package titled “Two Films by Yasujirō Ozu”. This single disc package also contains There Was a Father.
