= Sakamoto International Cemetery =

Cemetery in Nagasaki, Japan

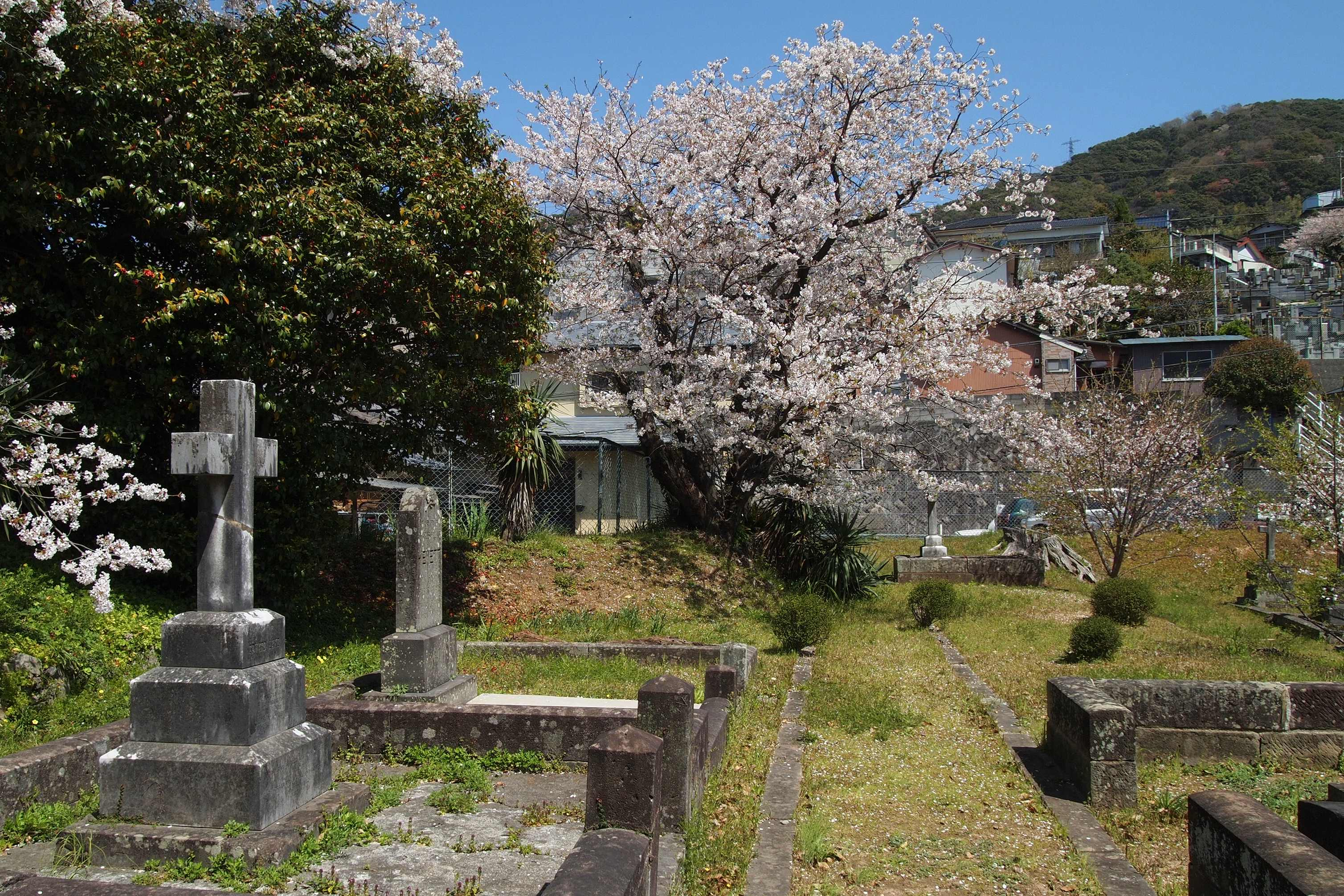
- Cherry blossoms inside the cemetery
- Interactive map of Sakamoto International Cemetery

Details
- Established: 1888
- Location: Nagasaki
- Country: Japan
- Coordinates: 32.7650°N 129.8679°E
- Type: Expatriate; Japanese Christian
- Owned by: City of Nagasaki
- Find a Grave: Sakamoto International Cemetery

The Sakamoto International Cemetery (坂本国際墓地, Sakamoto Kokusai Bochi) is located in Sakamoto in the Urakami area of the city of Nagasaki, Japan. The cemetery for foreigners was established following the 1888 closure of an earlier burial ground near the international quarter of the city. It is administered by the city government.

The original cemetery dates from 1888. A newer quarter, Shin Sakamoto (added in 1903), lies across the street. A Jewish cemetery is in Sakamoto, along with the graves of French soldiers and Vietnamese laborers who died during the Boxer Rebellion.

== Notable interments ==
- Thomas Blake Glover, 19th century trader; along with son Tomisaburo Kuraba and Tomisaburo's wife Waka.
- Sigmund D. Lessner, merchant and founder of Japan's first synagogue. A bust of Lessner marks his grave.
- Takashi Nagai, survivor of the nuclear bombing of the city, and his wife, Midori Moriyama.
