= Tomio Aoki =

Japanese actor (1923–2004)

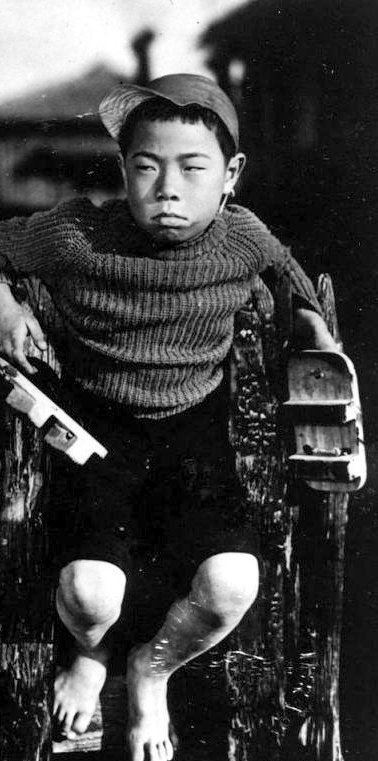
- Tomio Aoki in I Was Born, But.... in 1932
- Born: October 7, 1923; Yokohama, Japan
- Died: January 24, 2004 (aged 80); Setagaya, Tokyo, Japan
- Other name: Tokkan Kozo
- Years active: 1929–2004
- Awards: Three Continents Festival Best Actor (shared), for Not Forgotten (2000)

Tomio Aoki (青木 富夫, Aoki Tomio; October 7, 1923 – January 24, 2004) aka Tokkan Kozō (突貫小僧) was a Japanese film actor.

Aoki became famous as a child actor after debuting at the age of six in silent films directed by Yasujirō Ozu. His leading role in Ozu's 1929 short comedy Tokkan kozo gave Aoki his nickname. I Was Born, But... (1932), Passing Fancy (1933) and An Inn in Tokyo (1935) were three other Ozu films in which Aoki had notable roles. Aoki disappeared from Japanese cinema in 1940, at the age of 16, but returned to film acting in Kon Ichikawa's The Burmese Harp (1956). During the 1960s he appeared in films for directors Seijun Suzuki and Teruo Ishii before retiring again in 1972. He again returned to the screen in 1995 in Makoto Shinozaki's Okaeri, and appeared in Suzuki's Pistol Opera (2001). He continued appearing in films, and in short comedies by Shinozaki until his death in 2004. He shared the Best Actor award at the French Three Continents Festival with two of his co-stars for Shinozaki's Not Forgotten (2000). By the time of his death, at the age of 80, Aoki had performed in over 300 films.

== Selected filmography ==
- I Was Born, But... (1932)
- Passing Fancy (1933)
- An Inn in Tokyo (1935)
- The Burmese Harp (1956)
- Sun in the Last Days of the Shogunate (幕末太陽伝 Bakumatsu taiyōden) (1957)
- The Wandering Guitarist (1959)
- Okaeri (1995)
- Not Forgotten (2000)
- Pistol Opera (2001)
