= Hideo Ōba =

Japanese film director (1910–1997)

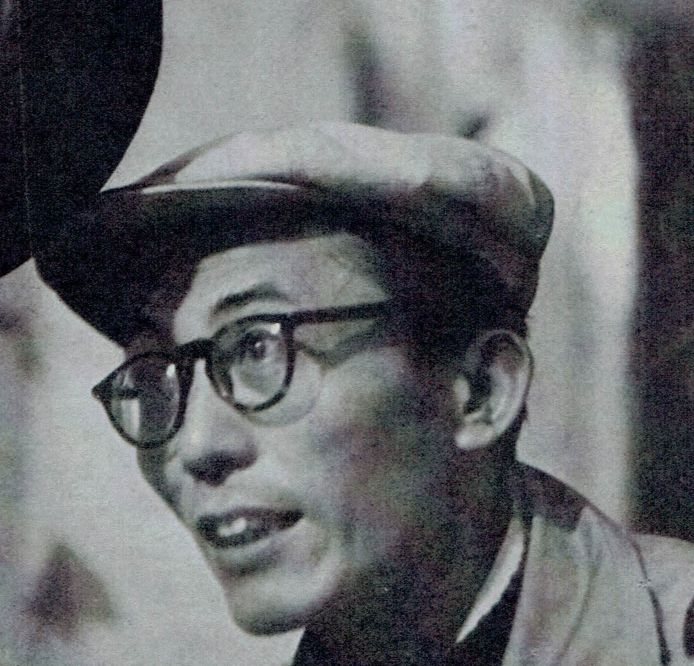
- Hideo Ōba in 1953 on Asahi Camera
- Born: 28 February 1910; Aoyama, Akasaka-ku, Tokyo
- Died: 10 March 1997 (aged 87)
- Occupation: Film director
- Years active: 1935–1969

Hideo Ōba (大庭 秀雄, Ōba Hideo, 28 February 1910 – 10 March 1997) was a Japanese film director and screenwriter.

== Life ==
Ōba was born on 28 February 1910, in Aoyama, Akasaka-ku, Tokyo.

After graduating from Keio University's Department of Japanese Studies, Ōba started working at Shochiku. There he became an assistant director to film director Yasushi Sasaki, and made his debut as a director in 1939 with the film Otto no kachi. A year before his directorial debut, he wrote Ai yori Ai he as a screenwriter.

In 1953, Ōba made Kazuo Kikuta's radio drama Kimi no na ha aired on NHK into a movie, which became a major hit. Kimi no na ha continued as a movie trilogy until 1954.

In his later years, he taught at the Japan Institute of the Moving Image.

Ōba died on 10 March 1997, at the age of 87.

== Selected filmography ==
- Otto no kachi (1939)
- Hana ha itsuwarazu (1941)
- Musume (1943)
- Kikyo (1950)
- Nagasaki no kane (1950)
- Kimi no na ha trilogy (1953-1954)
- Anata to tomoni (1955)
- Ejima ikushima (1955)
- Me no kabe (1958)
- Aru rakujitsu (1959)
- Zangiku monogatari (1963)
- Yukiguni (1965)
- Yokoborigawa (1966)
- Haru biyori (1967)
