= List of Japanese films of the 1920s =

An incomplete list of films produced in Japan ordered by year in the 1920s. For an A-Z of films see Category:Japanese films. Also see cinema of Japan.

== 1920–1921 ==
Title	Director	Cast	Genre	Notes
1920
Saraba seishun	Iyokichi Kondo; Norimasa Kaeriyama	Sugisaku Aoyama; Minoru Murata		Released 28 July. Studio: Eiga Geijutsu Kyōkai.
Utsukushiki Nippon	Thomas Kurihara			
Nichiren shōnin: Tatsunokuchi hōnan	Jirō Yoshida	Ichikawa Enjūrō		Released 1 October. Studio: Kokusai Katsuei. One 22-minute and one 34-minute print extant.
Tenjiku Tarō	Shiro Nakagawa	Ritoku Arashi		Released 13 November. Studio: Teikoku Kinema.
Amachua kurabu	Thomas Kurihara	Michiko Hayama; Tomu Uchida		Released 19 November. Studio: Taishō Katsuei.
Seikatsu antei no maki	Toyojirō Takamatsu; Tatsumi Iwaoka			Studio: Katsudō Shashin Shiryō Kenkyūkai. Print in National Film Center.
1921
Gōketsu Jiraiya	Shōzō Makino	Matsunosuke Onoe		Released 1 February. Studio: Nikkatsu. 21-minute print in National Film Center.
Hinamatsuri no yoru	Kisaburo Kurihara	Hayama Michiko		Released 30 March. Studio: Taishō Katsuei.
Rojo no Reikon	Minoru Murata	Kaoru Osanai; Zeya Togo		Released 8 April. Studio: Shochiku. Print in National Film Center.
Kantsubaki	Ryoha Hatanaka	Masao Inoue; Yaeko Mizutani		Released 24 April. Studio: Kokusai Katsuei. Print in National Film Center.
Gubijinsō	Henry Kotani	Sumiko Kurishima		Released 29 April. Studio: Shochiku.
Yama kururu	Kiyohiko Ushihara	Komei Minami; Haruko Sawamura		Released 1 July. Studio: Shochiku.
Kimi yo shirazu ya	Minoru Murata	Eliana Pavlova; Komei Minami		Released 16 July. Studio: Shochiku.
Ono ga tsumi	Zanmu Kako	Goro Okamoto; Sumiko Kurishima		Released 8 September. Studio: Shochiku.
Yaji Kita Zenkōji mairi no maki	Kichirō Tsuji; Yaroku Kobayashi	Matsunosuke Onoe; Sentarō Nakamura		Released 30 September. Studio: Nikkatsu. Print in National Film Center.

== 1922 ==
Title	Director	Cast	Genre	Notes
1922
Konjiki yasha	Zanmu Kako	Tsuzuya Moroguchi; Yoshiko Kawada	Romance	Released 1 February. Studio: Shochiku
Hototogisu	Yoshinobu Ikeda	Yūkichi Iwata; Sumiko Kurishima		Released 9 March. Studio: Shochiku. 19-minute print in National Film Center.
Futari Shizuka	Gengo Ōbora	Utako Nakayama		Released 25 April. Studio: Nikkatsu. Print extant.
Shibukawa Bangorō	Kōkichi Tsukiyama	Matsunosuke Onoe		Released 5 May. Studio: Nikkatsu. Print extant.
Chirinishi hana	Yasujirō Shimazu	Yuriko Hanabusa; Goro Okamoto		Released 21 June. Studio: Shochiku
Aa, Ono kundō	Zanmu Kako	Yuriko Hanabusa; Yoko Umemura		Released 23 July. Studio: Shochiku
Kagayaki no michi e	Yasujirō Shimazu	Goro Okamoto; Akio Isono		Released 10 August. Studio: Shochiku
Ai no kusabi	Yasujirō Shimazu	Yotaro Katsumi; Nobuko Satsuki		Released 20 September. Studio: Shochiku
Aa, Konishi junsa	Teinosuke Kinugasa; Tomu Uchida [debut]	Teinosuke Kinugasa		Released 28 November (some sources say 29 October). Studio: Makino Kyōiku Eiga
Kyōya erimise	Eizo Tanaka	Hideo Fujino		Released 30 December. Studio: Nikkatsu.

== 1923 ==
Title	Director	Cast	Genre	Notes
1923
Sendō kouta	Yoshinobu Ikeda	Yukichi Iwata; Sumiko Kurishima		Released 8 January. Studio: Shochiku.
Kohitsuji	Zanmu Kako	Tsuzuya Moroguchi; Yuriko Hanabusa		Released 1 February. Studio: Shochiku. Print in National Film Center.
Ai ni yomigaeru hi	Kenji Mizoguchi	Kaichi Yamamoto		Released 4 February. Studio: Nikkatsu.
Kokyo	Kenji Mizoguchi	Kaichi Yamamoto		Released 25 February. Studio: Nikkatsu.
Aa mujō - Dai ippen: Hōrō no maki	Kiyohiko Ushihara	Masao Inoue; Sumiko Kurishima	Drama	Released 1 April. Studio: Shochiku. 9-minute print in National Film Center.
Joen no chimata	Kenji Mizoguchi	Komei Minami		Released 20 April. Studio: Nikkatsu.
Aa mujō - Dai nihen: Shichō no maki	Yoshinobu Ikeda	Masao Inoue; Yukichi Iwata	Drama	Released 30 April. Studio: Shochiku.
Haizan no uta wa kanashi	Kenji Mizoguchi	Haruko Sawamura		Released 13 May. Studio: Nikkatsu.
Jinniku no ichi	Yasujirō Shimazu	Nobuko Satsuki		Released 15 June. Studio: Shochiku
Kiri no minato	Kenji Mizoguchi	Haruko Sawamura		Released 29 July. Studio: Nikkatsu.
Mizumo no hana	Yoshinobu Ikeda	Yukichi Iwata; Sumiko Kurishima		
Mori kundo tetsuro no tsuyu	Zanmu Kako	Taisuke Matsumoto		
Seishun no yumeji	Kenji Mizoguchi	Tetsuya Yoshimura; Yoneko Sakai		
Ono ga tsumi		Unpei Yokoyama		
Touge no uta	Kenji Mizoguchi	Kaichi Yamamoto; Haruko Sawamura		
Yama no senroban	Yasujirō Shimazu	Mitsuko Takao		
Zoku Amateur Club	Thomas Kurihara	Henry Kotani; Michiko Hayama		
Haikyo no naka	Kenji Mizoguchi	Haruko Sawamura		Released 30 September. Studio: Nikkatsu.
Chi to rei	Kenji Mizoguchi	Chiyoko Eguchi; Yoneko Sakai		Released 9 November. Studio: Nikkatsu.
Kosuzume Tōge	Kōroku Numata	Hataya Ichikawa; Tsumasaburo Bando		Released 30 November. Studio: Makino Film Productions. Print in National Film Center.
Ryōbensugi	Shirō Nakamura	Ritoku Arashi		Studio: Teikoku Kinema. Print in National Film Center.
Shigeki Wake no Kiyomaru kō	Toyojirō Takamatsu	Reizō Inoue		Studio: Katsudō Shashin Shiryō Kenkyūkai. Print in National Film Center.

== 1924 ==
Title	Director	Cast	Genre	Notes
1924
Sarutobi no ninjutsu	Jiro Yoshino	Shirogoro Sawamura		
Chairo no onna				
Kanashiki hakuchi	Kenji Mizoguchi	Yoneko Sakai		
Akatsuki no shi	Kenji Mizoguchi	Haruko Sawamura		
Koi no misshi	Henry Kotani			
Mouken no himitsu	Minoru Murata	Haruko Sawamura; Ryotaro Mizushima		
Rutsubo wa nieru	Kensaku Suzuki	Kaichi Yamamoto; Yoneko Sakai		
Gendai no jo-ou	Kenji Mizoguchi	Yoneko Sakai; Komei Minami		
Josei wa tsuyoshi	Kenji Mizoguchi	Yutaka Mimasu; Yoneko Sakai		
Hanasaka jijii	Teinosuke Kinugasa	Misao Seki		
Koi to bushido	Goro Hirose	Ritoku Arashi		
Shichimencho no yukue	Kenji Mizoguchi	Jun'ichi Kitamura; Yoshiko Tokugawa		
Chichi yo izuku	Norimasa Kaeriyama	Tappatsu Sekine; Teruko Azuma		Released 31 August. Studio: Teikoku Kinema. Other sources give title as Chichi yo izuko e and the year 1923.
Itō junsa no shi	Kensaku Suzuki; Kenji Mizoguchi; Gengo Ohora; Iyokichi Kondo	Enji Sato		
Samidare zoshi	Kenji Mizoguchi	Utako Suzuki; Hiroshi Inagaki		
Kanraku no zei	Kouroku Numata	Kashichi Shimada; Shizuko Mori		
Shiota Mondo	Goro Hirose			
Sohtoh	Bansho Kanamori	Misao Seki; Shizuko Mori		
Ningyo no sei	Shiro Nakagawa	Ritoku Arashi		
Shimizu Jirochō: Dai-ippen	Goro Hirose	Ritoku Arashi; Momonosuke Ichikawa		
Robin Hood no yume				
Shōjo no nayami		Mitsuko Takao		
Kōmori-yasu	Goro Hirose	Rikaku Arashi		
Kanraku no onna	Kenji Mizoguchi	kaichi Yamamoto; Yoneko Sakai		
Nukiuchi Gonpachi	Goro Hirose	Momonosuke Ichikawa		
Nageki no kujaku	Yoshinobu Ikeda	Sumiko Kurishima; Shinyo Nara		
Shinshutsu kibotsu	Goro Hirose	Momonosuke Ichikawa		
Kyokubadan no jo-o	Kenji Mizoguchi	Kumeko Urabe; Denmei Suzuki		
Mura no bokujo	Hiroshi Shimizu	Kinuyo Tanaka		
Kunisada Chūji	Shōzō Makino	Shōjirō Sawada		Released 31 December. Studio: Tōa Kinema. 33 min. print in National Film Center.
Sutotonbushi	Yoshinobu Ikeda	Jun Arai; Chōko Iida		Studio: Shochiku. Print in National Film Center. Also titled Koutashū dainihen sutoton.

== 1925 ==
Title	Director	Cast	Genre	Notes
1925
Uchen-Puchan	Kenji Mizoguchi	Kaichi Yamamoto; Kumeko Urabe		
Giketsu	Tomu Uchida	Kashichi Shimada		
Edo kaizoku-den: Kagebōshi - Zempen	Buntaro Futagawa	Tsumasaburo Bando; Shinpei Takagi		
Edo kaizoku-den: Kagebōshi	Buntaro Futagawa	Tsumasaburo Bando; Shinpei Takagi		
Hō wo shitau onna	Minoru Murata; Genjiro Saegusa	Kumeko Urabe		
Takasugi Shinsaku	Goro Hirose	Michisaburo Segawa		
Aiyoku no kiro				
Nantoh no haru	Yasujirō Shimazu	Tokuji Kobayashi; Chieko Matsui		
Gakuso o idete	Kenji Mizoguchi	Komei Minami; Iyokichi Kondo		
Daichi wa Hohoemu: Zenpen (1925 Shochiku film)	Kiyohiko Ushihara; Yasujirō Shimazu	Masao Inoue; Yuriko Hanabusa		
Daichi wa Hohoemu: Chuhen	Kiyohiko Ushihara; Yasujirō Shimazu	Masao Inoue; Hideo Fujino		
Daichi wa Hohoemu: Kōhen (1925 Shochiku film)	Kiyohiko Ushihara; Yasujirō Shimazu	Masao Inoue; Sumiko Kurishima		
Daichi wa Hohoemu: Dai ippen	Kenji Mizoguchi	Eiji Takagi; Eiji Nakano		
Daichi wa Hohoemu: Dai nihen	Osamu Wakayama	Eiji Nakano; Yoshiko Okada		
Daichi wa Hohoemi: Dai sanpen	Kensaku Suzuki	Eiji Nakano; Yoko Umemura		
Komoriuta	Eiichi Matsumoto	Yaeko Utagawa; Kokuten Takado		
Ah tokumukan kanto	Osamu Wakayama; Kensaku Suzuki; Kenji Mizoguchi	Komei Minami; Kaichi Yamamoto		
Rakka no Mai: Zenpen (1925 Nikkatsu film)	Tomiyasu Ikeda			
Rakka no Mai: Chuhen	Tomiyasu Ikeda	Haruko Sawamura		
Rakka no Mai: Shuhen	Tomiyasu Ikeda	Yoneko Sakai		
Yotsuya kaidan		Nobuko Satsuki		
Shirayuri wa nageku	Kenji Mizoguchi	Yoshiko Okada		
Daikon wa hohoemu	Takuji Furumi			
Nagaruru sake	Eiichi Matsumoto	Taisuke Matsumoto		
Akai yuhi ni terasarete	Kenji Mizoguchi; Genjiro Saegusa	Eiji Nakano; Komei Minami		
Horaijima	Takuji Furumi	Rintaro Fujima; Ranko Sawa		
Seinan sensō hishi: Kōjo Shiragiku				
Kanashiki koi no gensō	Yoshinobu Ikeda	Sumiko Kurishima; Shinyo Nara		
Meiken jakku		Taisuke Matsumoto		
Ijin musume to bushi	Shōzō Makino	Tsumasaburo Bando; Shizuko Mori		
Yōsei chi ni otsureba	Yasujirō Shimazu	Denmei Suzuki; Yuriko Hanabusa		
Murasaki no nisou	Eiichi Matsumoto	Taisuke Matsumoto; Ranko Sawa		
Toyo no Carmen	Frank Tokunaga	Kaichi Yamamoto; Komamo Sunada		
Araki Mataemon	Tomiyasu Ikeda	Matsunosuke Onoe; Goro Kawabe		
Eien no nazo	Masaru Omori	Taisuke Matsumoto; Ranko Sawa		
Orochi	Buntaro Futagawa	Tsumasaburo Bando; Utako Tamaki		
Machi no Suketchi	Kenji Mizoguchi	Yasunaga Higashibojo; Yoshiko Okada		
Ningen: Zenkohen	Kenji Mizoguchi	Eiji Nakano; Yoshiko Okada		
Furusato no uta	Kenji Mizoguchi	Masujiro Takagi		
Gokurakutō no jo-ou	Meiho Ogasawara	Aiko Takashima; Thomas Kurihara		
Maboroshi				
Nogi taisho to Kumasan	Kenji Mizoguchi	kaichi Yamamoto		

== 1926–1929 ==
Title	Director	Cast	Genre	Notes
1926
Kurutta Ippeji (A Page of Madness)	Kinugasa Teinosuke	Masao Inoue		24 September
Storm of Passion	Seiichi Kamei	Teruko Asahi, Momoko Ashiya		
1927
Blood of Penitence	Yasujirō Ozu			
1928
Edo Sangokushi (The Three Patriots of Edo)	Seika Shiba			
Jujiro (Crossways)	Kinugasa Teinosuke			11 May
Kurama Tengu: Kyōfu Jidai	Teppei Yamaguchi	Kanjuro Arashi, Reizaburo Yamamoto, Takasaburo Nakamura, Tokusho Arashi		
Kurama Tengu	Teppei Yamaguchi	Kanjuro Arashi, Takesaburo Nakamura, Reizaburo Yamamoto, Tokusho Arashi		
Wakodo no yume	Yasujirō Ozu	Tatsuo Saitō, Nobuko Wakaba	Comedy	
1929
Daigaku wa detakeredo	Yasujirō Ozu	Minoru Takada, Kinuyo Tanaka	Comedy	
Days of Youth	Yasujirō Ozu	Ichiro Yuki, Tatsuo Saitō	Comedy	
Monkey Sun				
