= Gyakuryu =

1924 film

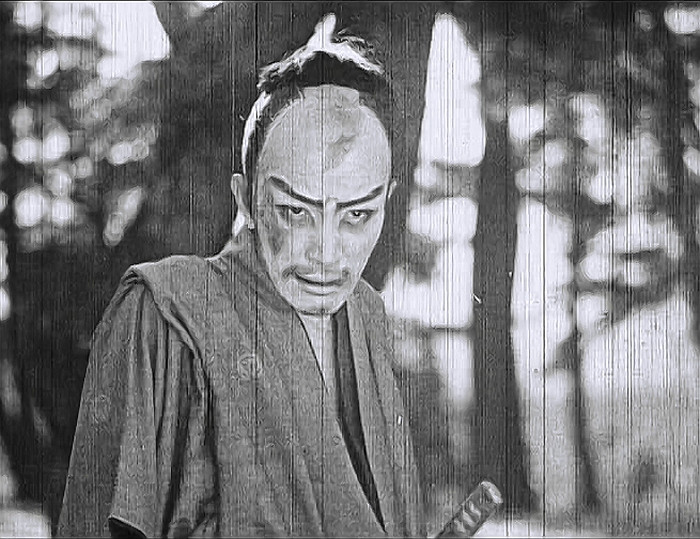
- Gyakuryu
- Directed by: Buntaro Futagawa
- Starring: Tsumasaburo Bando; Benisaburo Kataoka; Kanzaburo Arashi; Teruko Makino
- Narrated by: Midori Sawato
- Cinematography: Saichiro Hashimoto
- Distributed by: Digital Meme
- Release date: 1924 (Japan)
- Running time: 28 minutes
- Country: Japan
- Language: Silent (Japanese intertitles)

Gyakuryu (逆流, Backward Flow) is a 1924 black and white Japanese silent film with benshi accompaniment directed by Buntaro Futagawa. Often acclaimed as the predecessor to Orochi, it tells the tale of a nihilistic samurai, played by Tsumasaburo Bando whose mother is killed, whose sister is used and deceived and who loses the only love of his life.
