= Koina no Ginpei, Yuki no Wataridori =

1931 film

Koina no Ginpei, Yuki no Watadori
- Directed by: Tomikazu Miyata
- Written by: Shin Hasegawa
- Starring: Tsumasaburo Bando; Kikuya Okada; Saburo Kojima; Reiko Mochizuki
- Narrated by: Shunsui Matsuda; Midori Sawato
- Cinematography: Masatsugu Nagai
- Distributed by: Digital Meme
- Release date: 1931 (Japan)
- Running time: 60 minutes
- Country: Japan
- Language: Japanese

Koina no Ginpei, Yuki no Wataridori (鯉名の銀平 雪の渡り鳥) is a 1931 black and white Japanese silent film with benshi accompaniment directed by Tomikazu Miyata. It is based on the original story of a wandering gambler written by the popular author Shin Hasegawa. This is the first film adaptation of his story, which later inspired many filmmakers to create further adaptations of his work. The film was remade in 1957.

The first half of the movie depicts a man's jealousy of his best friend and the woman he loves. The second part depicts a hero who is ready to put the past behind him and risk his life for his friend.
