= Bromide (Japanese culture) =

Type of Japanese portrait photography

In Japanese culture, bromide (ブロマイド, buromaido) is a category of commercial photographic portraits of celebrities including geisha, singers, actors and actresses of both stage and film, and sports stars. The use of the term "bromide" or "promide" occurs regardless of whether bromide paper was actually used for the photograph.

Bromide prints are made of paper infused with silver bromide, making them sensitive to light and therefore able to be used for enlargement. Their use began in the 1880s, and because they had a range of finishes, they became the primary paper for black and white photography in the 1900s.

== Etymology ==
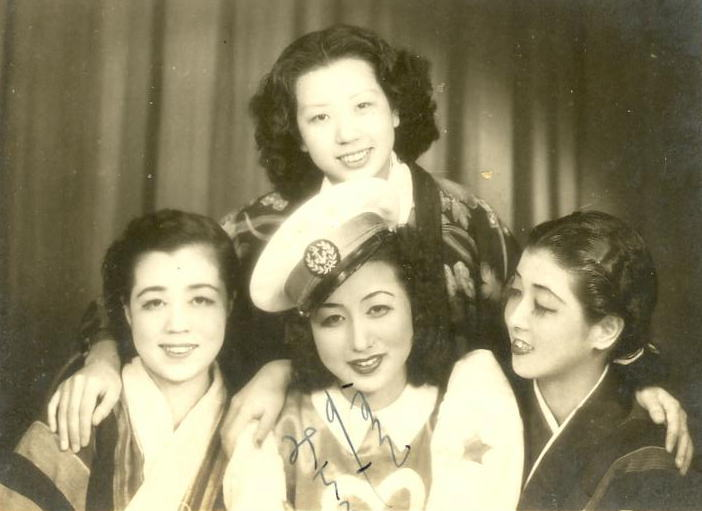
Bromide of Michiru Suminoe, 1942

In 1921 the Marubell Company began marketing photographs of celebrities under the name promide (プロマイド, puromaido). The first of these was a portrait of the film actress Sumiko Kurishima. Marubell sold the photographic paper as "bromide", and its finished photographs as "Promide". The two words eventually became synonymous and between the mid-1940s and the late-1980s sales of "bromides" were used to measure the popularity of Japanese idols.

The use of the term "bromide" to refer to a celebrity photograph remains a part of Japanese popular consciousness, and reference books such as the Kōjien Dictionary and NHK's Broadcasting Glossary recognize the term as such. "Promide" is used solely to refer to Marubell Company's bromides.

== Sales records ==
Sales records were released on a monthly basis for the following categories: "Male Singers", "Female Singers", "Actors", and "Actresses". Bromides remain a popular product in the idol industry to this day.

== History ==
=== History of bromides in Japan ===
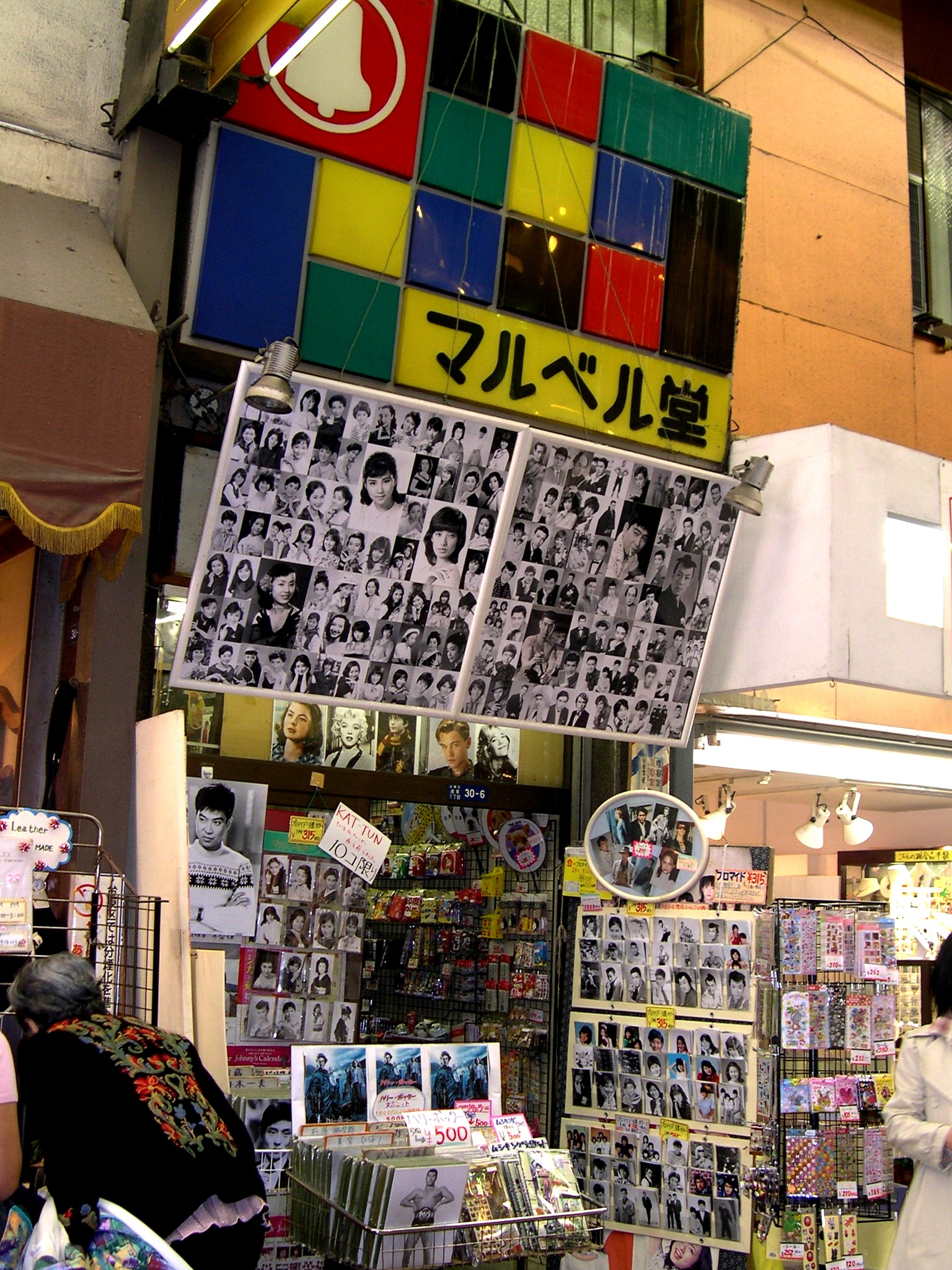
Marubell Storefront, Asakusa, Tokyo

Throughout the Edo period, ukiyo-e (woodblock prints and painting) were made of popularized Kabuki actors (referred to as yakusha-e) and sumo wrestlers (referred to as sumo-e). After the Meiji period, this was replaced by imported photographic portraits, although they were not yet referred to as "bromides" at the time.

Along the time that Shochiku Cinema established Shochiku Kamata Studios in 1921, the town's photoshops began mass-producing photographs of popular actresses at the time such as Sumiko Kurishima and Yoshiko Kawada.

Before the war, it seemed that many bromide collectors were of the mindset of becoming "that person's only one." It was noted that if the bromides of Japanese actor Kazuo Hasegawa were dirtied, they were gently wiped with handkerchiefs to prevent them from being scratched. Marubell described bromides as "photographs for the fans." The company used photos where actors' eyes were facing forward, and also retouched the images to give them more youthful looks. Bromides of American and European actors such as Jack Mulhall were also sold.

=== Global history of bromide printing ===
During the late 1890s in Germany, photography which had originally been an inaccessible hobby for many due to its cost, was becoming accessible due to technological developments in the field. The NPG (Neue Photographische Gesellschaft lit. 'New Photographic Society'), a photographic bromide-printing company, was founded by Arthur Schwarz during July of 1894 in Schöneberg, Germany. Because of a variety of NPG patents that were registered across different countries from 1895 to 1897, NPG was able to partner with many other companies in London, New York, and Paris, amongst others.

Wilhelm II personally thanked the NPG for printing copies of his portrait for every public building in the country.

== Contemporary forms of bromide ==
=== In Japan ===
Bromides can still be found in the modern day, and also see representation in newer forms of Japanese media. Bromides are no longer restricted to celebrities and nowadays bromides of media such as anime and video games are produced, such as in Pokémon, with its photocards of different trainers and their iconic Pokémon partners. Pokémon bromides are not sold individually, but instead included in chewing gum packs, often resulting in them having higher resell prices.

Even in Sega's Japanese steampunk media franchise Sakura Wars, future game installments of the series feature collectible bromide postcards items showing characters in their original form from the first game, accompanied by a brief description.

In the RPG series Lunar, bromides appear as collectibles, each featuring an artwork piece displayed in a vertically-panning view accompanied by music.

Deltarune's Chapter 5 parodies the use of bromides as collectibles in the Lunar series, featuring two such collectibles of the chapter's primary antagonist Flowery.

=== In Korea ===
The term is actively used in Korean culture, where it is the name of a K-pop magazine. Based on usage of the term by, for example, sellers of K-pop goods on eBay, "bromide" denotes an oversized photo or mini-poster of a celebrity on card stock with a laminated cover or glossy finish.
