= Akeyuku Sora =

1929 film

- Directed by: Torajiro Saito
- Written by: Ayame Mizushima
- Starring: Mitsuko Takao; Reikichi Kawamura; Yoshiko Kawata; Shoichi Kotoda
- Narrated by: Midori Sawato
- Cinematography: Yoshio Taketomi
- Production company: Shochiku Kamata
- Distributed by: Digital Meme (DVD)
- Release date: 26 May 1929
- Running time: 71 minutes
- Country: Japan
- Language: Japanese

Akeyuku Sora (明け行く空, The Dawning Sky) is a 1929 black and white Japanese silent film with benshi accompaniment directed by Torajiro Saito. Written by Ayame Mizushima, is a melodrama about an orphan and her mother who are separated and lose contact, but are later reunited.

== Cast ==
- Mitsuko Takao (高尾光子)
- Reikichi Kawamura (河村黎吉)
- Yoshiko Kawada (川田芳子)
- Shoichi Kotoda (小藤田正一)
- Shin Kuragata 久良形真
