= Shinpei Takagi =

Shinpei Takagi may refer to:

- Shinpei Takagi (actor, born 1985) (高木心平), Japanese actor
- Shinpei Takagi (actor, born 1902) (高木新平), Japanese actor
