= Marine Kong =

- Title card
- Genre: Tokusatsu; Kaiju; Science fiction; Action; Adventure
- Created by: Nisan Productions
- Starring: Hayashi Hiroshi; Ota Hiroyuki
- Country of origin: Japan
- Original language: Japanese
- No. of episodes: 26

Production
- Running time: 24 minutes

Original release
- Network: Fuji Television
- Release: April 3 – September 25, 1960

Marine Kong (Japanese: 怪獣マリンコング, Hepburn: Kaijū Marin Kongu; lit. 'Monster Marine Kong') is a 26-episode 1960 Japanese television series (told in two thirteen episode chapters) produced by Nisan Productions. It aired on the Fuji Television network every Sunday from April 3 to September 25. The series is about a giant mechanical dinosaur created by a criminal organization known as the Z-Gang to seize control of Japan. This show is the first Japanese television series about a kaiju.

== Overview ==
The series was broken into 2 episode arcs that ran 13 half hour episodes each and aired every Sunday morning from 9:30 AM to 10:00 AM. The first arc was titled Monster Marine Kong (かいじゅうマリンコング) while the second arc was titled Marine Kong Strikes Back (「マリンコングの大逆襲」). In the series, "Marine Kong", a giant dinosaur standing 40 m tall, rises out of the Ocean and attacks Hiratsuka. When Dr. Yada, a renowned scientist, discovers the creature is giving off radio waves, he deduces that Marine Kong is artificial rather than biological. Marine Kong was constructed by a terrorist organization known as the Z-Gang to help them reach their goal of overthrowing the Japanese government, and it is controlled remotely via a wireless transmitter device. Eventually, the Z-Gang's plans are thwarted by a jamming radio wave invented by Dr. Yada, causing Marine Kong to self-destruct. In the second arc, the Z-Gang rebuilds the destroyed Marine Kong into an even more powerful weapon, but Dr. Yada manages to take over the control waves of the creature and reconfigure it. He then reprograms it to follow the commands of his son, Kazuo. Under Kazuo's command, Marine Kong is sent to attack the Z-Gang and thwart their plans once and for all.

== Production ==
In 1959, Nisan Productions planned on producing a series called "Great Seabeast Gebora"(大海獣ゲボラ). The series would feature a large starfish monster as the main character. This series was planned for the TBS network. An outline for this series was published in the September 1959 issue of Boy Pictorial Magazine. Shin-Toho were hired to produce the special effects and six episodes were scripted before it was ultimately canceled. The following year in 1960, Nisan decided on producing another show featuring a marine-based kaiju this time for Fuji TV, which would become Marine Kong.

Shots of the second Marine Kong rampaging through Japanese cities

This new series took influence from kaiju films, King Kong, Moonlight Mask and Tetsujin 28-go. King Kong was the inspiration for the name. When Gebora the "Marine Mammal" became the kaiju "Marine Kong", publicity materials stated "King Kong comes from the setting of a jungle, Marine Kong comes from the setting of the sea". The Kaiju influence and the monster being Dinosaurian in appearance came from the Kaiju films from Toho. In 1954 Toho studios produced the first Kaiju movie in Japan called Godzilla. In 1955, they produced a sequel, while in 1956 and 1958 they produced both Rodan and Varan respectively. These early Kaiju films were very popular and convinced Nisan Productions that the idea of a Kaiju starring in a serialized television series could be successful. While this was not the first time a Kaiju appeared on Japanese television (in 1958 a huge ape called Mammoth Kong appeared in the popular superhero show Moonlight Mask), it was the first series to star a Kaiju as the main character. This show set the foundation for many latter Kaiju-themed shows that populated Japanese airwaves in the latter 1960's such as Ambassador Magma and Ultraman, as it combined the "Kaiju" genre with the medium of episodic television. The second arc of the series drew direct inspiration from Tetsujin 28-go and Moonlight Mask.

Tetsujin 28-go debuted as a manga in 1956 and became immensely popular. The series featured a boy who could control a gigantic robot and this was reflected in the series as Kazuo could control the reprogrammed Marine Kong and used it to battle the Z-Gang. Some of the latter episodes of Marine Kong featured a female scientist named Takamiya Hisako who could transform into the "Red Angel' a masked superheroine in the same vain as Moonlight Mask. Red Angel was the first transformation-based superheroine on Japanese TV.

Shots of the two distinct faces of Marine Kong

Initially the budget for the show was small (¥20,000), and the costume for the monster was built with soft rubber. The suit was built by the Pook Puppet Theater Company (人形劇団プーク), a puppet company that debuted in 1929. Despite its budget, the costume featured illuminated eyes. During some destruction scenes the monster is seen walking superimposed over shots of buildings being destroyed in order to save money on expensive special effects shots. When Fuji TV broadcast the show the ratings were very strong featuring a 27% audience share. The broadcast was then expanded nationwide to 26 stations. Because of this success, Nisan was able to increase the budget for the series' second arc which included building a more detailed costume with a wire operated mouth for the actor to manipulate, the construction of life-sized hands and feet and more detailed miniature work. The first Marine Kong suit was said to have scared its young audience with its large eyes. When the second suit was built it was given a slightly different face to appear more appealing to young audiences. The series was directed by Toshio Shimura and Toshiro Lizuka.

The series was popular and various manga comics featuring the character was released such as "Monster Marine Kong" from Shōnen Gahōsha " where it was serialized from June to September 1960. Various toys and merchandise were also released.

== Episodes ==
Part 1 Monster Marine Kong

- Episode 1 April 3 The Mystery of the Monster
- Episode 2 April 10 Danger! Kazuo
- Episode 3 April 17 The Boatman
- Episode 4 April 24 The Secret of the X Radio Waves
- Episode 5 May 1 Tracking the Signal
- Episode 6 May 8 Friend or Foe?
- Episode 7 May 15 Debunking the Monster
- Episode 8 May 22 Discovery of the Enemy Base
- Episode 9 May 29 Using Strategy Against the Enemy
- Episode 10 June 5 You Will Not Escape!
- Episode 11 June 12 The Approaching Crisis
- Episode 12 June 19 Homebase Infiltration
- Episode 13 June 26 The Great Explosion

Part 2 Marine Kong Strikes Back

- Episode 14 July 3 Take Control of the Monster
- Episode 15 July 10 The crisis! Kazuo
- Episode 16 July 17 The Secret Laboratory of Crisis
- Episode 17 July 24 Red Angel! Ally of Justice
- Episode 18 July 31 Duel on the Plateau
- Episode 19 August 7 Save Kazuo!
- Episode 20 August 14 The Threatening Phone Call
- Episode 21 August 21 In the Looming Clutches
- Episode 22 August 28 In Desperate Pursuit
- Episode 23 September 4 Stratagem
- Episode 24 September 11 Time Bomb
- Episode 25 September 18 The Approaching Battle!
- Episode 26 September 25 The Z-Gang

== Cast ==
- Dr. Yada: Hayashi Hiroshi

Radio waves Institute director, the authority of physics.

- Kazuo Yada: Ota Hiroyuki

Son of Dr. Yada. Controls Marine Kong in second arc.

- Maru: Mihara Yuko

Photographer following the Marine Kong incident

- Iwata reporter : Koji Oda

Newspaper reporter who follows the Marine Kong incident.

- Yada Hitomi : Kikuchi Yoko

Leader of the Z-Gang

- Takamiya Hisako / Red Angel : Hisako Tsukuba

Female scientist who is also the masked heroine Red Angel who battles against the Z-Gang.

- Marine Kong: Takagi Shinpei

Giant robot monster built by the Z-Gang for global domination that runs on radio waves. Two different versions were built described as Unit 1 and Unit 2.

== Home Video ==
In 1984, Global Video released a handful of episodes on VHS tape in Japan.
