= The Geisha (1914 film) =

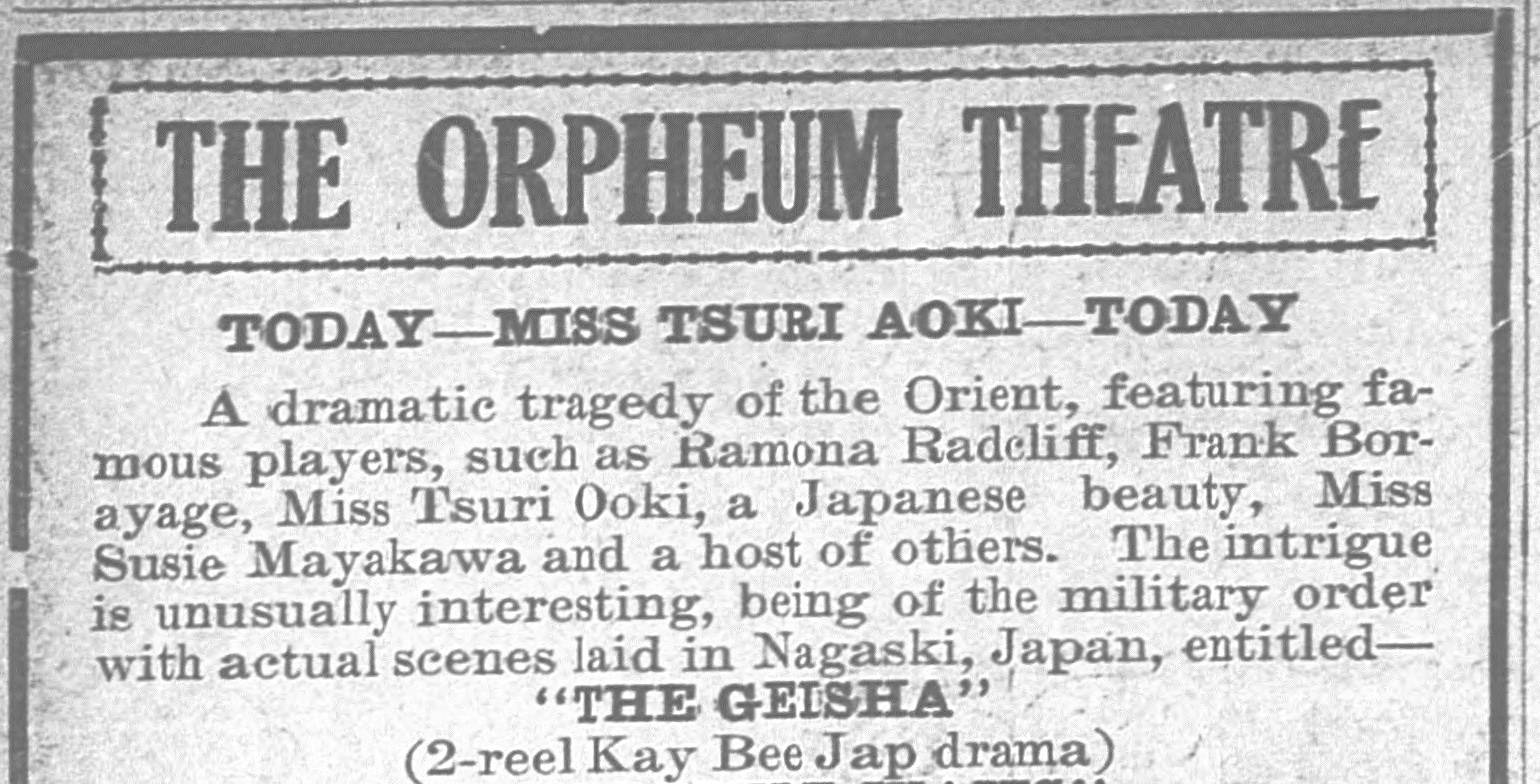
- Contemporary advertisement
- Directed by: Raymond B. West
- Written by: J.G. Hawks
- Starring: Sessue Hayakawa; Tsuru Aoki
- Music by: Sidney Jones
- Production company: Kay-Bee Pictures
- Distributed by: Mutual Film
- Release date: May 10, 1914 (USA)
- Running time: 20 mins.
- Language: English

The Geisha is a 1914 American silent drama short film, directed by Raymond West and using music by Sidney Jones from the stage musical The Geisha. The film features Sessue Hayakawa and Tsuru Aoki, It also stars Frank Borzage, Ramona Radcliffe and Henry Kotani in important roles.

== Plot ==
According to a film magazine, "Ordered to foreign waters. Ensign Carver bids his fiancee goodbye and sails for Japan. Carver, his chum, Blake, and two or three other officers, take shore leave at Nagasaki, sight seeking. They visit a Japanese garden and meet Myo, a beautiful Geisha girl. Carver falls in love with the girl. So infatuated is he that he refuses to return to his ship. Blake, in order to save Carver from himself, attempts to arrest him, but Carver makes bis escape. Blake, to save Carver from disgrace in the service, tells the captain that Carver has fallen and broken bis thigh and will be compelled to remain in the hospital for some time. Carver marries Myo and remains in Japan and writes to Cecelia, breaking the engagement.

Two years later Senator Ridgway, father of Cecelia, is ordered to Japan on diplomatic service. They meet Carver in the Japanese Tea Garden. He is now a derelict, spending most of his time drinking. Carver learns that Senator Ridgway is desirous of procuring certain papers from the Japanese government and in order to regain his lost favor in Cecelia's eyes attempts to steal the papers from Baron Yoshido. He is watched by Takura, the deposed lover of Myo, and followed to Senator Ridgeway's apartments, where Carver commits suicide sooner than be captured by the Japanese soldiers. The picture closes with Myo sobbing at her shrine in the garden."

== Cast ==
- Sessue Hayakawa - Takura
- Tsuru Aoki - Myo
- Frank Borzage - Ensign John Carver
- Ramona Radcliffe - Cecilia Ridgeway
- Herbert Standing - Senator Ridgeway
- Chester Withey - Lt. Blake
- Gladys Brockwell
- Henry Kotani
