= Mrs. Temple's Telegram =

1920 film directed by James Cruze

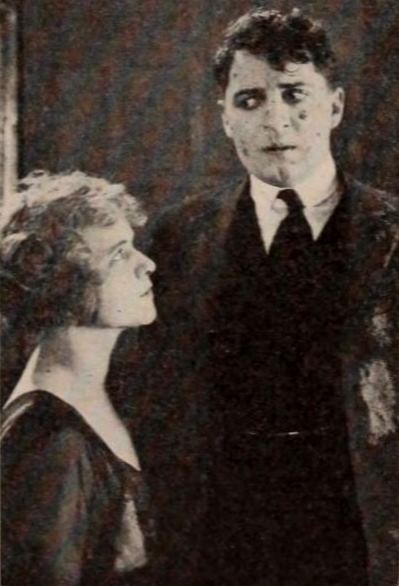
- Still of Hawley and Washburn with the caption "Slept all night on a department store roof, eh? That's a tall one."
- Directed by: James Cruze
- Written by: Elmer Harris (scenario)
- Based on: Mrs. Temple's Telegram by Frank Wyatt
- Produced by: Adolph Zukor; Jesse L. Lasky
- Starring: Bryant Washburn
- Cinematography: Henry Kotani
- Distributed by: Paramount Pictures
- Release date: May 9, 1920
- Running time: 5 reels
- Country: United States
- Language: Silent (English intertitles)

Mrs. Temple's Telegram is a 1920 American silent comedy film directed by James Cruze and starring Bryant Washburn and Wanda Hawley. It is based on the 1905 Broadway play Mrs. Temple's Telegram by Frank Wyatt. It was produced by Famous Players–Lasky and released through Paramount Pictures.

This film survives and is preserved at the Library of Congress and at Gosfilmofond, Moscow.

== Plot ==
As described in a film magazine, Jack Temple adores his wife, but Mrs. Clara Temple is extremely jealous, and accuses him of flirting with a pretty woman in a department store tea room. After his wife's departure, the woman in question follows Jack around the store and even onto the roof of the building, where he was trying to hide. They are locked in there by the night watchman and have to remain on the roof all night. Jack realizes his wife will never believe this story, so he invents a yarn about visiting his friend John Brown in a distant town. Clara suspects that he is not telling the truth and sends a telegram to Brown, while Jack convinces a friend to impersonate Brown and come to his house. Receiving the telegram, Brown goes to the Temple home. Things become complicated with the arrival of Mrs. Brown, the pretty young woman who caused all the trouble, but, after she introduces herself as one of Clara's cousins, all ends happily.

== Cast ==
- Bryant Washburn as Jack Temple
- Wanda Hawley as Mrs. Clara Temple
- Carmen Phillips as Pauline
- Walter Hiers as Frank Fuller
- Sylvia Ashton as Mrs. Fuller
- Leo White as John Brown
- Anne Schaefer as Mrs. Brown
- Edward Jobson as Wigson

== See also ==
- The Six Best Cellars
- The Gypsy Trail
- Too Much Wife
