= Older Brother, Younger Sister =

1953 Japanese film

- Japanese film poster

Japanese name
- Kanji: あにいもうと
- Directed by: Mikio Naruse
- Written by: Yōko Mizuki; Saisei Murō (short story)
- Produced by: Nobuo Miura
- Starring: Machiko Kyō; Masayuki Mori; Yoshiko Kuga
- Cinematography: Shigeyoshi Mine
- Edited by: Toyo Suzuki
- Music by: Ichirō Saitō
- Production company: Daiei Film
- Distributed by: Daiei Film
- Release date: 19 August 1953 (Japan)
- Running time: 87 minutes
- Country: Japan
- Language: Japanese

Older Brother, Younger Sister (Japanese: あにいもうと, Hepburn: Ani imōto) is a 1953 Japanese drama film directed by Mikio Naruse. The film is based on the short story Ani imōto by Saisei Murō.

== Plot ==
Mon, the elder daughter of a rural family, returns home from Tokyo pregnant after an affair with college student Kobata. Her parents fear a scandal that might threaten the marriage prospects of the younger sister San. Also, Mon, as the film suggests, supports San's education by prostitution, as the father's business had to close down and the mother hardly manages to finance the family by running a small store. The ill-tempered eldest brother Inokichi decides to take on the role of a disciplinarian, first beating up Kobata when he visits the family to apologise, and later Mon. Still, Mon forgives him and returns to the capital.

== Cast ==
- Machiko Kyō as Mon
- Masayuki Mori as Inokichi
- Yoshiko Kuga as San
- Eiji Funakoshi as Kobata
- Kumeko Urabe as Riki, the mother
- Reizaburō Yamamoto as Akaza, the father

== Reception ==
Six years after the film's premiere, film historian Donald Richie objected that by "attempting to move from realism to naturalism, Naruse is occasionally at fault in manipulating his characters a bit too obviously". In 2008, film scholar Alexander Jacoby called Older Brother, Younger Sister an "uncharacteristically brutal film in which the emotional tensions […] explode into physical violence". Keith Uhlich of Slant Magazine gave the film 3.5 of 4 stars for showing Naruse's "considerable skill at portraying household dynamics".

== Literary source ==
First published in 1934, Saisei Murō's short story Ani imōto had won the Bungei Konwakai Award. It had been adapted for the screen the first time in 1936 by Sotoji Kimura and again in 1976 by Tadashi Imai. The story has been translated into English by Edward Seidensticker and is available in the anthology Modern Japanese Stories.

== Legacy ==
Older Brother, Younger Sister was screened at the Museum of Modern Art in 1985 as part of its retrospective on Mikio Naruse, and at the Cinémathèque Française in 2016 and 2017.
