= Kumeko Urabe =

Japanese actress (1902–1989)

- 浦辺粂子
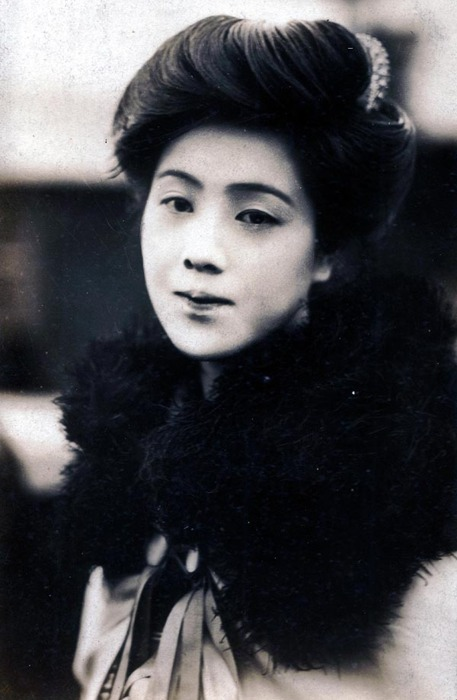
- Urabe in 1925
- Born: Kume Kimura; October 5, 1902; Kamo District, Shizuoka, Japan
- Died: October 26, 1989 (aged 87); Shinjuku, Tokyo, Japan
- Other names: Kumeko Ichijo; Toyama Midori; Chidori Shizuura; Chidori Toyama
- Occupation: Actress
- Years active: 1924–1987
- Spouse: Koichi Ueno (m. 1928; div. 1930)

Kumeko Urabe (Japanese: 浦辺 粂子, romanized: Urabe Kumeko), born Kimura Kume (木村 くめ, Kimura Kume), (October 5, 1902 – October 26, 1989) was a Japanese movie actress, one of the first in the country. She worked on stage and in film and television. Urabe was born in a rural part of Shizuoka Prefecture. She lived in several homes while growing up, as she relocated with her father, a Buddhist priest, among the temples to which he was assigned. Urabe completed her education in Numazu, and left school in 1919 to join a theatre company, touring under various stage names as an actor and dancer.

In 1923, Urabe auditioned at the film studio Nikkatsu, and adopted the name Kumeko Urabe, by which she was known for the rest of her life. She appeared in her first film the following year, and continued to act until 1987. She worked with such directors as Kenji Mizoguchi and Mikio Naruse, and performed in over 320 films, including Ikiru, Older Brother, Younger Sister, Portrait of Madame Yuki, She Was Like a Wild Chrysanthemum, and Street of Shame. She also starred in television dramas, including thirteen episodes of Toshiba Sunday Theatre between 1958 and 1980. In the following decade, she carved a niche as a Grandma idol, until her death in 1989.

== Biography ==
=== Early life ===
Kimura Kume (木村 くめ) was born on October 5, 1902, the daughter of Keichu Kume, a Rinzai priest at Kenchō-ji, and Hana Kume. She grew up in the rural district of Kamo as an only child, her one sibling, an older brother, having died when he was young. In 1909, the family moved to Kawazu, also in Shizuoka Prefecture, where Kume attended the primary school. In 1915, the family moved again, this time to Numazu, where her father served at the Myōshin-ji temple. Kume finished her formal schooling two years later, attending Numazu Girls' School. During this time, her interest in acting had been formed by seeing Rensageki, a form that mixed silent film and stage play. In 1919, she left school and joined Yasuyoshi Suzuki's troupe, adopting the stage name Kumeko Ichijo.

Over the next four years, Kume joined travelling theatres and opera companies, perfecting her singing and dance routines, as well as learning to act in many roles. She also adopted a number of stage names, including Toyama Midori, Chidori Shizuura, and Chidori Toyama. It was also during this time that she met Chieko Saga: the pair became known as "Sagachi" and "Tochi".

=== Movie career ===
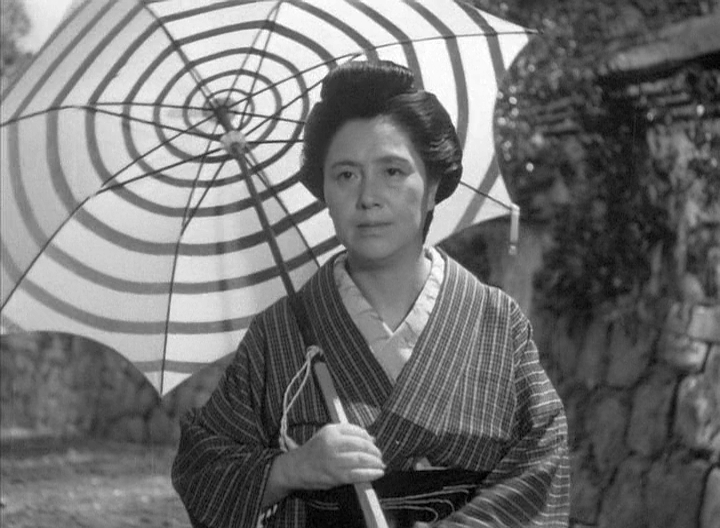
Kumeko Urabe in Wild Geese (雁) directed by Shirō Toyoda, 1953

In August 1923, Yasumasa Hatano recommended that she audition at the film studio Nikkatsu. Urabe was successful, and adopted the stage name Kumeko Urabe, which she retained for the rest of her career with pride. In fact, decades later, she objected to her birth name on the Medal of Honour with Purple Ribbon, saying that the award was for the work of Kumeko Urabe. She appeared in her first film in 1924, playing the heroine in the film Seisaku's wife (清作の妻). She was one of the first female actors in Japanese cinema. Her skills attracted the attention of the director Kenji Mizoguchi, who cast her alongside Denmei Suzuki in the film The Dusty World (塵境), released in the same year.

After this, Urabe became one of the most popular members of the studio, after Yoneko Sakai and Haruko Sawamura. She worked with Mizoguchi on many of his films which were released in the next four years, including The Ax That Cuts Love (恋を断つ斧), Queen of the Circus (曲馬団の女王) and No Money, No Fight (無銭不戦). She developed a close relationship with the director, even being by his side when he was attacked by Yuriko Ichiro, the scar from which became what Tokuzo Tanaka calls Mizoguchi's badge of honour. After a brief break from acting between 1928 and 1930, she appeared in Mizoguchi's next film Tojin Okichi (唐唐人お吉). He also cast her in other films over the next decade, including Gion Festival (祇園祭) and The Water Magician (瀧の白糸) in 1933. Up to this point she had almost exclusively starred in silent films. In July 1933, she left the studio to join Shinkō Kinema, which in 1942 became Daiei Film. It was during this time that she first appeared in talking pictures.

Urabe continued to appear in films after the Second World War. The 1947 film Koisuru Tsuma (恋する妻) was her first with director Ryo Hagiwara. In 1952, she played the role of Watanabe Kanji's wife Tatsu in Akira Kurosawa's film Ikiru (生きる). In the same year, she appeared in Mikio Naruse's Lightning (稲妻). She subsequently worked with Naruse in Older Brother, Younger Sister (あにいもうと) released the following year and became one of his stable group of actors. She also rejoined Mizoguchi for his final film, Street of Shame (赤線地帯, Akasen Chitai), released in 1956. Her movies also reached an increasingly international audience. For example, in 1955, she appeared in Hiromichi Horikawa's Hiba Arborvitae Story (あすなろ物語), which was released with English subtitles as Tomorrow I'll be a Fire Tree.

During the 1960s, Urabe continued to be cast in films, often in the role of a grandma, as in Keisuke Kinoshita's Lovely Flute and Drum (なつかしき笛や太鼓, Natsukashiki fue ya taiko), which was released in English in 1967 as Eyes, the Sea and a Ball. She later appeared in Kōkotsu no hito (恍惚の人), which explored the issue of dementia and was released with English subtitles in 1994 as Twilight Years.

By the end of her career, Urabe had appeared in over 320 films and worked with some of the most well-known directors in Japanese cinema. During her life, she received a number of accolades, including the Medal of Honour with Purple Ribbon in 1966 and the individual merit award at the inaugural Fumiko Yamaji Film Awards in 1977.

=== Other work ===
In addition to her movie career, Urabe expanded her repertoire by appearing in television drama, firstly in episodes of There Are People Here which were aired in 1957 and 1959. She subsequently went on to play many roles, increasingly of grandmothers, in other shows, including Sharp Tuesday Theatre and Toshiba Sunday Theatre. In the latter case, she appeared in a total of thirteen episodes in the period between 1958 and 1980, her last in the 1228th episode, titled Song of Thoughts (想思樹の歌). After 1980, Urabe increasingly found work as a Grandma Idol. She released two singles in November 1984, titled I Became a Singer (わたし歌手になりましたよ) and Octopus Song (タコの唄). She was at the time the oldest debut singer in history.

=== Private life ===
On October 23, 1928, Urabe married Koichi Ueno, the son of a wealthy man from Kyoto. The couple gambled heavily, and the marriage ended in divorce in April 1930. Urabe never remarried. In her free time, she enjoyed mahjong and gambled on bicycle and boat races. On October 25, 1989, the stove in her Tokyo apartment set alight her clothing and she was severely burned. Taken to Tokyo Medical University Hospital in Nishi-Shinjuku, she died of her injuries the next day.

== Filmography ==
=== Film ===
Urabe appeared in over 320 films including:

- 1924, Seisaku's wife (清作の妻), Come.
- 1924, The Dusty World (塵境), Omatsu.
- 1924, The Ax that Cuts of Love (恋を断つ斧), Pearlko, Senami Chinami.
- 1924, Queen of the Circus (曲馬団の女王), Supein no hato.
- 1925, A Women who Longs for the Law (法を慕ふ女), Yuriko.
- 1925, Special Mission Ship Kanto (噫特務艦関東), Village daughter.
- 1925, No Money, No Fight (無銭不戦), Tsubame Musume.
- 1925, Human Front and Back (人間 前後篇), Yukie.
- 1925, General Nogi and Mr. Kuma (乃木将軍と熊さん), Kuma's wife, Yu
- 1927, Dolls House (人形の家), Miyako Hayashida.
- 1930, Tojin Okichi (唐唐人お吉), Omatsu.
- 1931, And They Go (しかも彼等は行く), Atsuko's mother.
- 1933, The Water Magician (瀧の白糸), Ogin.
- 1934, Messenger from the Moon (月よりの使者), Jailer.
- 1936, The Lieutenant's daughter (大尉の娘), Yutaka.
- 1937, Straits of Love (愛怨峡), Midwife Murai Ume.
- 1938, Ah, My Home (あゝ故郷), Shinkichi's second wife.
- 1942, Kindness (新雪), Kinbe's wife.
- 1943, Genghis Khan (成吉思汗), Weruenke.
- 1948, Women of the Night, Aunt of pimp.
- 1949, Hills of a Foreign Country (異国の丘), Iku.
- 1949, Ginza Kankan Musume (銀座カンカン娘), Odai.
- 1950, Mrs Pearl (真珠夫人) Aunt Karasawa and Otami.
- 1950, A Mother's Love
- 1950, Portrait of Madame Yuki (雪夫人絵図) San.
- 1951, Marriage March (結婚行進曲), Auntie.
- 1951, Ikiru (生きる), Watanabe wife, Tatsu.
- 1951, Repast (めし), Shige Taniguchi.
- 1952, Lightning (稲妻), Osamu.
- 1953, Where Chimneys Are Seen (煙突の見える場所), Kayo Nojima.
- 1953, Older Brother, Younger Sister (あにいもうと), Riki.
- 1953, The Wild Geese (1953 film) (雁, Gan), Otsune.
- 1954, Twenty-Four Eyes (二十四の瞳), Teacher's wife.
- 1954, Somewhere Beneath the Wide Sky (この広い空のどこかに), Shige.
- 1955, Hiba Arborvitae Story (あすなろ物語), Minko's grandmother.
- 1955, She Was Like a Wild Chrysanthemum (野菊の如き君なりき), Minko's grandmother.
- 1955, The Magistrate (次男坊判官), Shige.
- 1956, Street of Shame (赤線地帯), Otane.
- 1956, Typhoon Over Nagasaki (忘れえぬ慕情), Fujita.
- 1958, I Knew the Cat (猫は知っていた), Chie Kuwata.
- 1958, The Eternal Rainbow (この天の虹), Osamu's mother.
- 1960, Irohanihoheto (いろはにほへと), Mine Matsumoto.
- 1962, Japanese Grandma: A Comedy (喜劇 にっぽんのお婆あちゃん), Zamameba Asan Waka.
- 1962, Being Two Isn't Easy (私は二歳), Ino.
- 1962, Crazy Movie: Irresponsible Japanese Guy (クレージー映画 ニッポン無責任野郎), Ume Nakagome.
- 1964, Yearning (乱れる), Bar madam at Ginzang hot-spring.
- 1964, Jakoman and Tetsu (ジャコ萬と鉄), Taka.
- 1966, Hit and Run (ひき逃げ), Hisako Kanematsu.
- 1967, Happiness to you, Sentimental boy (君に幸福を センチメンタル・ボーイ), Kura Ninotani.
- 1967, Scattered Clouds (乱れ雲). Mishima Nui.
- 1968, A Woman and Miso Soup (おんなとみそしる), Old guest.
- 1968, Sun on a Solitary Island (孤島の太陽), Oume.
- 1968, Crazy Movie: Mexican Free for All (クレージー映画 クレージーメキシコ大作戦), Ume Suzuki.
- 1973, Man of Ecstasy (恍惚の人), Grandma Kadoya.
- 1973, Shinano River (しなの川), Mother.
- 1977, The Life of Chikuzan (竹山ひとり旅), Daikoku of the Temple.
- 1980, Before Spring (海潮音), Ushima Zuyo.
- 1985, Lonely Heart (さびしんぼう), Fuki Inoue.
- 1987, Hachiko Monogatari (ハチ公物語), Mrs Uchigi.

=== TV ===
Urabe has appeared in over 100 TV episodes, including:

- NHK – There Are People Here (ここに人あり)

- 1957, Episodes 26 & 27 House of Others (他人の家)
- 1959, Episode 77 Interrupting the Wall (壁さえぎるとも).

- KRT/TBS – Toshiba Sunday Theatre (東芝日曜劇場). 13 episodes including:

- 1958, 91 Oki Letter (置手紙)
- 1964, 416 Father and Son (父と子たち)
- 1973 890 Spring Wife (妻の春)
- 1980 1228 Song of Thoughts (想思樹の歌).

- 1961, CX – Sharp Tuesday Theatre (シャープ火曜劇場) "Like Nogiku" (野菊の如く).
- 1966, TBS – Keisuke Kinoshita Hour (木下恵介アワー) "Memorial Tree" (記念樹).
- 1971, NTV – Anxious Wife (気になる嫁さん).
- 1981–1982, TBS – When Hamanasu flowers bloom (はまなすの花が咲いたら).
- 1988, NTV – Female Lawyer Ayuko Takabayashi: 4 Shinshu Iida Line Tenryukyo Gorge (女弁護士・高林鮎子4 信州飯田線殺意の天竜峡).

== Writing ==
Urabe authored a number of books including:

- Urabe, Kumeko Half-life of a movie actress (映画女優の半生, Eiga joyū no hansei) Tokyo: Tokyo Engei Tsūshinsha, 1925 OCLC 672573354
- Urabe, Kumeko I am the actress Kumeko Urabe (浦辺粂子のあたしゃ女優ですよ, Urabe kumeko no atasha joyū desuyo) Tokyo: Shikai Shobō, 1985 ISBN 978-4-91562-901-3
- Urabe, Kumeko Crazy about the Movie: The Autobiography of Actress Kumeko Urabe (映画道中無我夢中 : 浦辺粂子の女優一代記, Eiga dōchū muga muchū : Urabe Kumeko no joyū ichidaiki) Tokyo: Kawade Shobō Shinsha, 1985 ISBN 978-4-30900-412-9
- Urabe, Kumeko; Sugai, Ichiro and Kawazu, Seizaburo Movie Troublemakers (映画わずらい, Eiga wazurai) Tokyo: Rikugei Shobo, 1966 OCLC 673055020
