= Kosuzume Toge =

1923 film

Kosuzume Tōge
- Directed by: Koroku Numata
- Written by: Rokuhei Susukita
- Starring: Banya Ichikawa; Shinpei Takagi; Tamataro Ichikawa; Kaoru Akiyoshi; Tsumasaburo Bando
- Cinematography: Saichiro Hashimoto
- Production company: Makino Film Productions
- Release date: 1923 (Japan)
- Running time: 39 minutes (Digital Meme DVD); 48 minutes (Disk Plan DVD)
- Country: Japan
- Language: Japanese (intertitles)

Kosuzume Tōge (小雀峠, Kosuzume Pass) is a 1923 Japanese black-and-white silent film directed by Koroku Numata. The film is notable as the oldest preserved film featuring jidaigeki star Tsumasaburo Bando, appearing in a minor role, and one of the very few extant works featuring the period-drama star Banya Ichikawa in the lead.
