= Ayame Mizushima =

Japanese novelist and screenwriter (1903–1990)

- Born: Chitose Takano; June 17, 1903; Muika, Niigata, Japan
- Died: December 31, 1990 (aged 87); Paris, France
- Occupations: novelist and screenwriter

Ayame Mizushima (水島 あやめ, Mizushima Ayame; 17 June 1903 – 31 December 1990) was a Japanese novelist and screenwriter, commonly referred to as the first woman to have received on screen credit in Japan.

== Biography ==
=== Early life ===
Mizushima was born into a wealthy family; her mother's family had a bookstore where she would consult novels. In 1960 (at the age of 13), she was introduced to Nobuko Yoshiya, a commercially successful novelist who specialized in serialized romance novels for teenage girls and is known to be the pioneer of Japanese lesbian literature. These serials are what made Mizushima want to become a novelist. At the age of 14, she contributes to the local newspaper and a magazine. At the age of 18, she enters the Japanese Women College in home economics. On September 1, 1923, the Great Kanto earthquake strikes and Mizushima is affected in her region.

=== Career ===
Mizushima was born by the name of Chitose Takano. Her pen name was created upon the release of The Song of the Fallen Leaves (Ogasawara, 1924), a film for which she wrote the script, in order to avoid expulsion from Japan Women's University, where viewing films (and therefore partaking in any production) was prohibited. She received on screen credit for this film, making her the first Japanese woman to have been recognized as a screenwriter. She worked at the Shochiku Kamata Studios until 1935, when it moved to Ōfuna. She is known for writing melodramas and comedies and has credit for 29 screenplays. In 1928, she wrote the screenplay for Sora No Kanata (Beyond the Sky), based on the novel by Nobuko Yoshiya. Her last film, Kagayate Shonen Nihon (Shine On! Boy Japan), was her first and only talkie. Therefore, the advent of sound in film coincides with the end of her career as a screenwriter. She then retired to become a children's writer until 1955.

== Published works ==
- 友情の小径 (1940, writer)
- 櫻咲く日 (1941, writer)
- 美しき道 (1943, writer)
- 白菊散りぬ (1948, writer)
- 久遠の夢 (1948, writer)
- 秋風の曲 (1948, writer)
- 乙女椿 (1949, writer)

== Film credits ==
- Ochiba no uta (1924, story)
- Gokurakutô no joō (1925, writer)
- Kyokuba-dan no shimai (1926, screenplay/story)
- Utsukushiki hōbaitachi (1928, writer)
- The Dawning Sky (1929, writer)
- Oya (1929, writer)
- Akeyuku Sora (1929)
- Junjō (1930, original story/ screenplay)
- Modern okusama (1930, screenplay/story)
- Crying to the Blue Sky (1932, screenplay)
- Seppun jūjiro (1935, writer)
- Kagayate Shonen Nihon (Shine On! Boy Japan) (1935, writer)
