= Portrait of Madame Yuki =

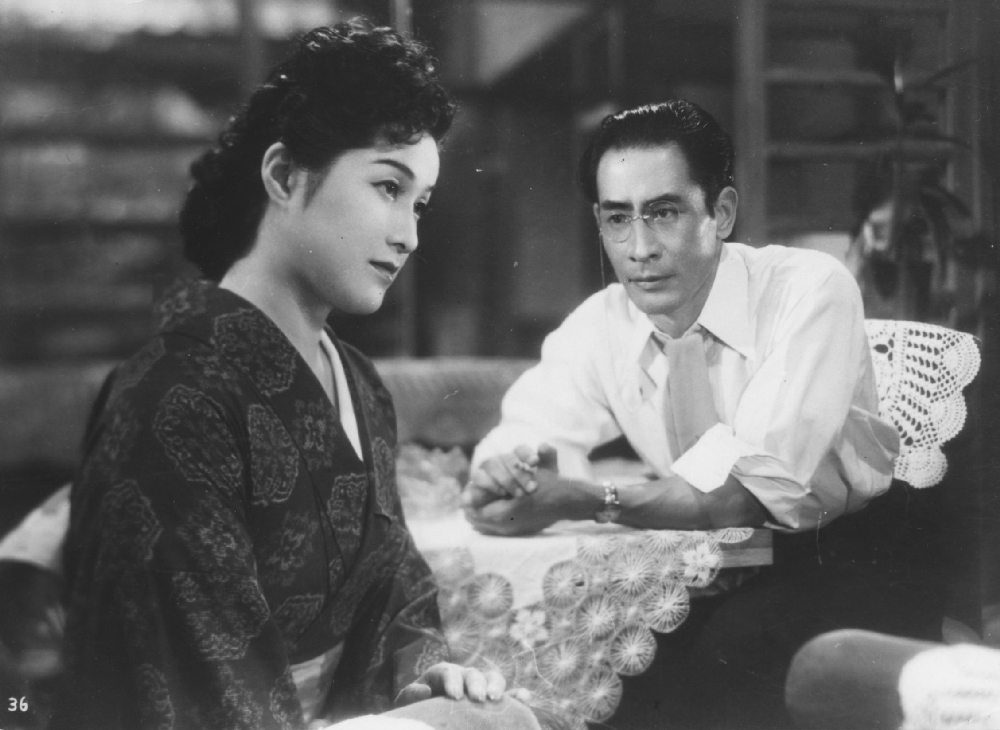
- Michiyo Kogure and Sō Yamamura
- Directed by: Kenji Mizoguchi
- Screenplay by: Kazuo Funahashi; Yoshikata Yoda
- Based on: Yuki fujin ezu; by Seiichi Funabashi
- Produced by: Kazuo Takimura
- Starring: Michiyo Kogure; Yoshiko Kuga; Ken Uehara
- Cinematography: Jōji Ohara
- Edited by: Toshio Goto
- Music by: Fumio Hayasaka
- Production companies: Takimura Productions; Shintoho
- Distributed by: Shintoho
- Release date: 21 October 1950
- Running time: 88 minutes
- Country: Japan
- Language: Japanese

Portrait of Madame Yuki (雪夫人絵図, Yuki fujin ezu), also titled A Picture of Madame Yuki, is a 1950 Japanese drama film directed by Kenji Mizoguchi.

== Plot ==
The story is seen through the eyes of a star struck new maid. Yuki Shinano, a descendant of the once powerful Shinano family, is living in an unhappy marriage with her husband Naoyuki. Although he treats her disdainfully and has an open affair with his mistress Ayako, whom he even brings to Yuki's residence in Atami, she is tied to him through sexual dependency. Yuki and koto teacher Masaya have a mutual affection since childhood, but are too weak-willed to change the situation.

In an attempt to gain autonomy, Yuki opens an inn in her residence, but Naoyuki makes Ayako the head of the business, only to find out later that he himself has been bought out by Ayako and his lawyer Tateoka. Yuki, pregnant from her husband but suspected of adultery through a scheme contrived by Tateoka, drowns herself in the lake.

== Cast ==
- Michiyo Kogure as Yuki Shinano
- Yoshiko Kuga as Hamako Abe
- Ken Uehara as Masaya Kikunaka
- Eijirō Yanagi as Naoyuki Shinano
- Sō Yamamura as Tateoka
- Yuriko Hamada as Ayako
- Kumeko Urabe as housekeeper
- Haruya Kato as Seitaro
