= Shunsui Matsuda =

Japanese benshi actor (1925–1987)

Shunsui Matsuda (松田 春翠, Matsuda Shunsui) was the last Japanese benshi of the silent film era. He dedicated his life to finding and preserving valuable classic films from the golden era.

== Biography ==
Born in 1925 in Tokyo, Shunsui Matsuda performed as child benshi. It was only after the Pacific War, when the post-war shortages created a demand in films that Matsuda really began his vocation as a Benshi.

In 1948, he officially took up his name as the second Matsuda Shunsui and in the same year he was awarded the top prize in the national Film Narrator's Competition.

In 1952, he founded the Matsuda Film Company and was appointed President of the Friends of Silent Films Association, both which are still being thriving under the guidance of his second son, Yutaka Matsuda. Matsuda Film Company, based on Matsuda private collection, contains over 1,000 films on 6,000 reels, the largest collection of Japanese silent films.

In 1984, Matsuda received an invitation from the Frankfurt Museum of Cinema and he gave his first Benshi performance in Europe. A year later, he received the first Tokyo Metropolitan Culture Prize.

Shunsui Matsuda died of cancer on 8 August 1987.

== Filmography ==
- 1979: Jigoku no Mushi (Maggots of Hell) – director
- 1980: Bantsuma – Bando Tsumasaburo no Shogai (Bantsuma – The Life and Times of Bando Tsumasaburo) – producer
- 32 works of "Katsuben Talkie Version" (music and narration all written by himself) – producer

== Awards ==
- 1948: Awarded top prize in the national Film Narrator's Competition
- 1963: Awarded Million Pearl Prize
- 1985: Awarded the first Tokyo Metropolitan Culture Prize

== Trivia ==
- One of his students is benshi Midori Sawato.
- He appeared in Yume miru yoni nemuritai alongside Midori Sawato.
- The films that Matsuda managed to collect from around the country constitute around 1000 films, the bulk of which are silent films, amounting to about 6000 rolls of film.

== See also ==
- Silent Film
- Tsumasaburo Bando
- Midori Sawato
- Benshi
