= Yoshiko Kawada =

Japanese actress (1895–1970)

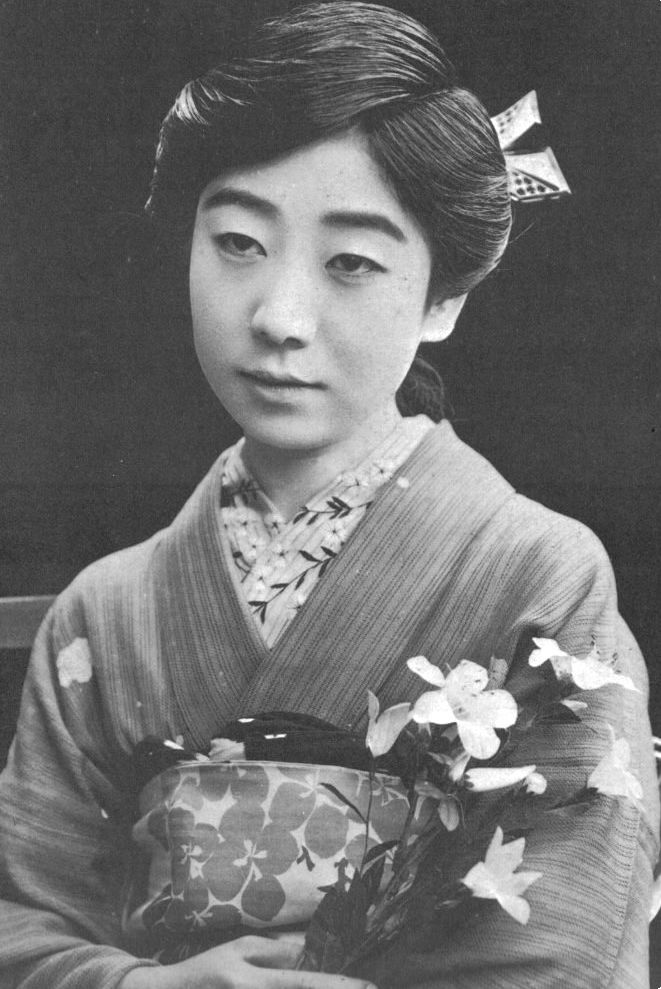
- Yoshiko Kawada in the 1920s
- Born: 17 October 1895; Furumachi, Niigata City
- Died: 23 March 1970 (aged 74); Sōka, Saitama Prefecture
- Other name: Yoko Kawakami (stage name)
- Occupations: Geisha,Actress

Yoshiko Kawada (17 October 1895 – 23 March 1970) (川田芳子 in Japanese, or かわだ よしこ in kana) was a Japanese actress on stage, and in silent and sound films.

== Early life ==
Kawada was born in Furumachi, Niigata City. She trained as a geisha in Tokyo, then joined the theatre troupe of Sada Yacco.

== Career ==
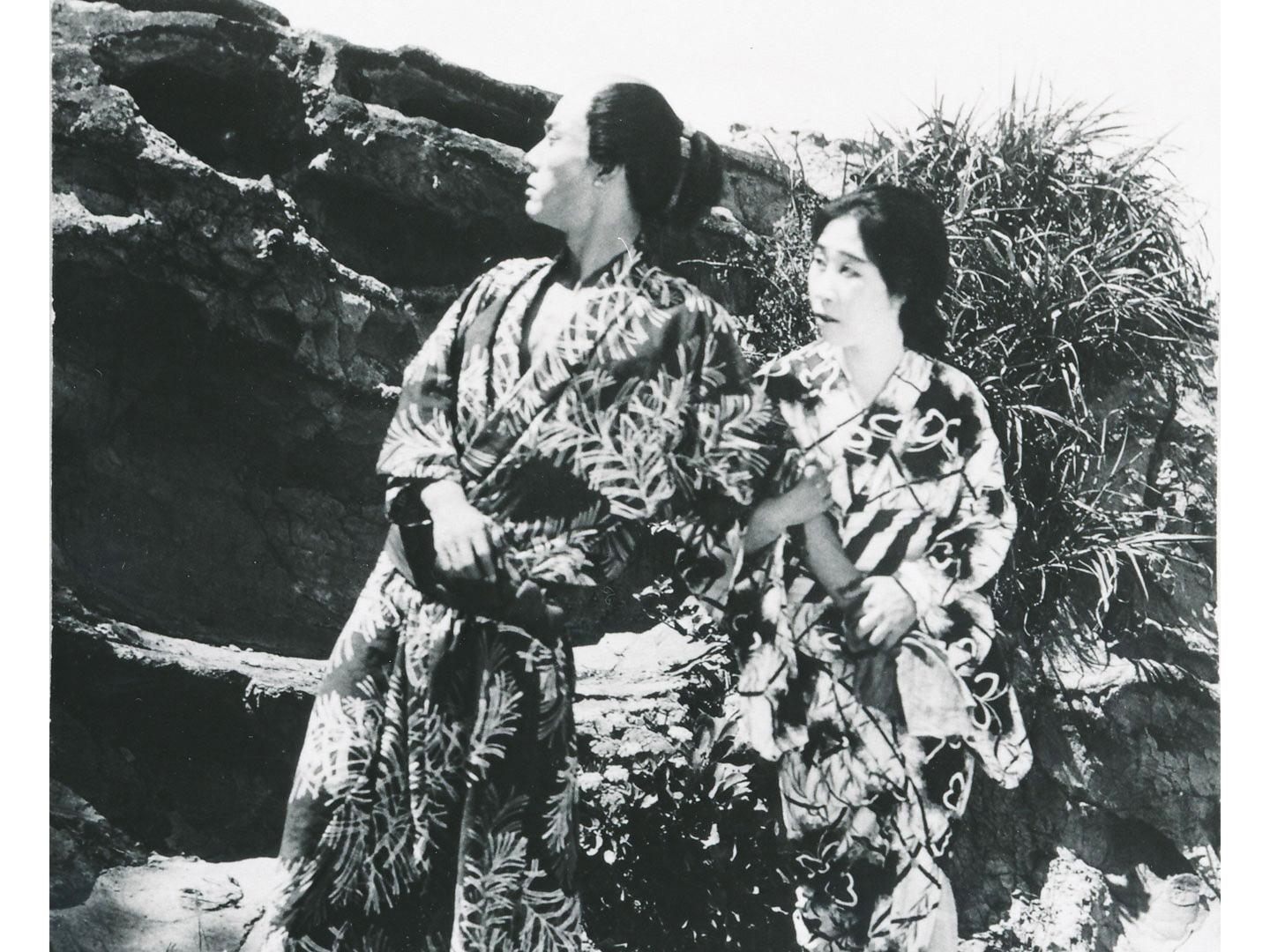
A still from Shima no onna (1920), featuring Yoshiko Kawada

Kawada made her stage debut at Tokyo's Imperial Theatre, under the stage name Yoko Kawakami ("Kawakami" was the family name of Sada Yacco's late husband, Kawakami Otojirō). She was popular in Japanese silent films in the 1920s and in early sound films in the 1930s, with over a hundred screen credits. She was one of the highest-paid actresses in Japan, according to a 1925 report.

Kawada's first film role was in Shima no onna (Island Woman, 1920), directed by Henry Kotani for the Shochiku studio; her last was in Kane no naru oka - Dai sanhen: Kuro no maki (1949). She often played mothers, including in Akeyuku Sora (The Dawning Sky, 1929), directed by Torajirō Saitō, in which she played a poor widowed mother separated from her only child; they reunite years later, after the mother finds a new life in churchwork. She initially retired from screen acting in 1935, after her starring role in Haha no ai (Mother's Love); but she had roles in two films after World War II.

== Personal life ==
Kawada adopted a daughter; she was also known to be kind to Hachiko, a famous dog in Tokyo. Kawada died in 1970, at the age of 74, in Sōka.
