= Yoshinobu Ikeda =

Japanese film director (1892–1973)

- 池田義信
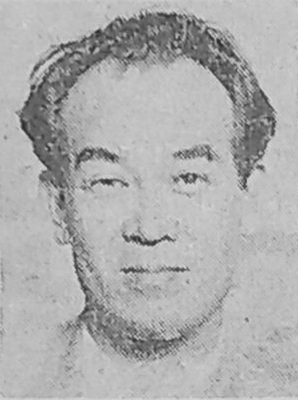
- Born: 10 March 1892; Nagano, Nagano, Japan
- Died: 1 September 1973 (aged 81)
- Occupation: Film director

Yoshinobu Ikeda (池田 義信, Ikeda Yoshinobu; 10 March 1892 – 1 September 1973) was a Japanese film director and film industry executive.

== Career ==
Born in Nagano Prefecture, Ikeda first worked at the post office before heading to Tokyo in 1920 to join the theater world. He entered the Shochiku studio in 1921 and debuted as a film director the same year with Nasanu naka. He became one of the top directors of Shochiku's Kamata studio in Tokyo, scoring a major hit with Sendō kouta in 1923. He eventually quit directing films in 1936 and became a film producer. After World War II, he became the secretary general of first the Motion Picture Producers Association of Japan and then Eirin.

His wife was Sumiko Kurishima, one of Japan's first female film stars and the star of Sendō kouta.

== Selected filmography ==
- Nasanu naka (生さぬ仲) (1921)
- Sendō kouta (船頭小唄) (1923)
