= Sumiko Kurishima =

Japanese actress (1902-1987)

- 栗島すみ子
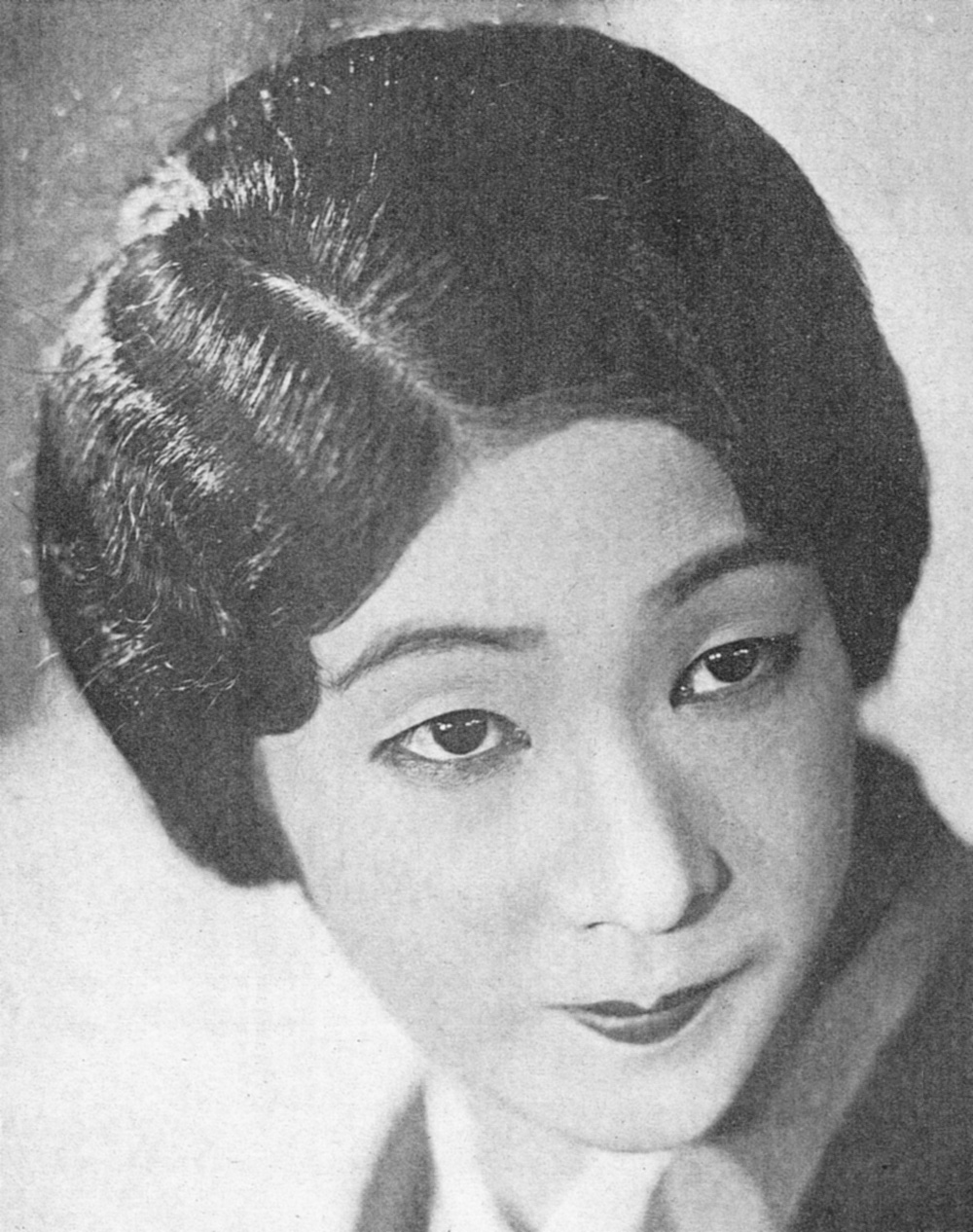
- Sumiko Kurishima in 1931
- Born: 15 March 1902; Tokyo, Japan
- Died: August 16, 1987 (aged 85)
- Other names: Kōsen Mizuki, Kakō Mizuki
- Occupations: Actress, dancer
- Spouse: Yoshinobu Ikeda

Sumiko Kurishima (栗島すみ子, Kurishima Sumiko) (15 March, 1902 – 16 August, 1987) was a Japanese actress and master of traditional Japanese dance. She is often considered Japan's first female movie star.

== Career ==
On her father's side, Kurishima was the daughter of Sagoromo Kurishima, an actor and newspaper reporter, and the granddaughter of Ayasegawa Sanzaemon, a professional sumo wrestler who reached the rank of ōzeki. Her aunt on her mother's side, Fumiko Katsuragi, was also an actress. She learned traditional Japanese dance from an early age and used the name Kakō Mizuki when performing. Also appearing on stage, she entered the Shōchiku studio in 1921 and debuted in Henry Kotani's adaptation of Natsume Sōseki's The Poppy. Often appearing as the tragic heroine of films directed by her future husband, Yoshinobu Ikeda, she is considered Japan's first popular female movie star, especially considering that male onnagata played female roles in the movies up until the early 1920s. She retired from the screen in 1938 and concentrated on teaching dance, becoming the leader of her own school. She did return to the screen in 1956, however, to appear in Mikio Naruse's Flowing.

== Selected filmography ==
- The Poppy (虞美人草, Gubijinsō) (1921)
- Denkô to sono tsuma (1921)
- Toranku (1921)
- Omoi tsuma (1921)
- Ho no namida (1921)
- Yuku kumo (1921)
- Ono ga tsumi (1921)
- Nasanu naka (1921)
- Yama e kaeru (1921)
- Kenbu no musume (1921) - Yûko
- Shakko (1921)
- Kure yuku ekiji (1921)
- Tokuri (1921)
- Kyokukô nami o terasu (1921)
- Konjiki yasha (1922)
- Umi no kiwami made (1922)
- Hototogisu (1922)
- Chikyôdai (1922)
- Chizôme no gûnki (1922)
- Haha no kokoro (1922)
- Gion yawa (1922)
- Sôfuren (1922)
- Hikareyuku hi (1922) - Ryohei's daughter Sawako
- Yôjo no mai (1922) - Mizushima Kaneko
- Kokawa-dera (1922)
- Eien no nazo (1922)
- Zanko (1922) - Naoya's daughter Toshie
- Yuki no yawa (1922)
- Kessakushûsui konjiki yasha (1922)
- Sendō kouta (船頭小唄) (1923) - Okimi
- My Friend (1923) - Elder sister (segment 2)
- Shiniyuku tsuma (1923) - Wife Kimie
- Futatsu no michi (1923)
- Gendai no josei (1923) - Younger daughter Taeko
- Yami Wo Yuku (1923) - Sachie / Sachie's daughter Midori
- Nasuna koi (1923) - Baishi - daughter of Monsei
- Jikatsu suru onna (1923) - Hayase Kyoko
- Haha (1923) - Sadao's wife Shizue
- Daitokyo no ushimitsudoki daiippen higekihen (1923) - Tsuyuka
- Mizumo no hana (水藻の花) (1923) - Ohana
- Kosome to kinya (1923) - Kosome
- Oyako no tabiji (1923)
- Tsumi no tobira (1923) - Akizuki Masako
- Ohimegusa (1923) - Otsuyu, Mother
- Yuhoshu Ono ga tsumi (1923)
- Kanojo no unmei (1924)
- Eien no Haha (1924) - Misao
- Sweet Home (1924) - Factory woman Ofusa
- Hatachi no Koro #3 (1924) - Daughter
- Nageki no kujaku (嘆きの孔雀) (1924) - Murata Miyako
- Hototogisu namiko (1924)
- Koi no Hikyoku (1925) - Tsuyuko
- Aru Onna no Hanashi (1925) - Proprietress Ochika
- Daichi wa hohoemu (大地は微笑む) (1925, part 1-3) - Daughter Shuren
- Mahjong (1925)
- Umi no himitsu (1925)
- Kanashiki koi no gensō (悲しき恋の幻想) (1925) - Forest maiden Hiname
- Hakushaku Reijo (1925)
- Koizuma (1925) - Haruko
- Hojoka (1925) - Wife Sonoko, Choran
- Sabishiki Michi (1925) - Daughter Okiku
- Shô-chan no Kamata hômon (1925)
- Kowareta Ningyo (1926) - Maiko Haruyu
- Sayoko (1926) - Nagasa Sayoko
- Shi no Komoriuta (1926) - Takayama Kiyo
- Chinpira Tantei (1926) - Hideko
- Utsukushiki Inori (1926) - Blind woman Michie
- Nageki no bara (1926) - Kikue's friend
- Junanbana (1926) - Kikukawa Sumiko
- Yôfu gonin onna - Dai gohen: Reijô Osumi (1926)
- Koi no Wakare Michi (1927)
- Hisako no hanashi (1927) - Hisako, daughter of Shincho
- Shinju fujin (1927)
- Kindai Nyobo Kaizo (1927)
- Tama wo Nageutsu (1927)
- Seishun no Komichi (1928)
- Tengoku no Hito (1928)
- Onna no isshô (1928) - Hanako Andô
- Fûfu (1928)
- Tôge no Rakuen (1928)
- Ai no Yukusue (1928)
- Kângeki no harû (1929)
- Aîjin tokie no mâki (1929)
- Tasogare no yuwaku (1929)
- Ukiyo komichi (1929)
- Kibô (1929)
- Oyaji to sono ko (1929)
- Kotoshidake (1929)
- Kekkongaku nyûmon (1930) - Toshiko, his wife
- Reijin (1930) - Tomoko Mizuhara
- Kânôjo wa dôkoê iku (1930)
- Onnâgokorô wa mîdasumâji (1930)
- Ojôsan (1930) - Young Lady
- Machî no runpên (1931)
- Shimai zenpen (1931)
- Shimai kohen (1931)
- Ômoîde oki onna (1931)
- Depâto no himegimi (1932)
- Sôshiju (1932)
- Sei naru chibusa (1932)
- Tsubakihime (1932)
- Kujakubune (1933)
- Seidon (1933) - Sachiko
- Every-Night Dreams (1933) - Omitsu
- Îro wa nioedô (1933)
- Kanraku no yo wa fukete (1934)
- Yumê no sasayâki (1934)
- Nihon josei no uta (1934)
- Daigaku no wakadanna - Nihonbare (1934)
- Haha no ai (1935)
- Kajuen no onna (1935)
- Eikyû no ai ramûru ekuruneru zenpen (1935)
- Eikyû no ai ramûru ekuruneru kohen (1935)
- What Did the Lady Forget? (淑女は何を忘れたか, Shukujo wa nani o wasureta ka) (1937) - Tokiko, madam in Kojimachi
- Nakimushi kozo (1938) - Sadako, Keikichi's mother
- Flowing (流れる, Nagareru) (1956) - Ohama (final film role)
