= Edo Sangokushi =

1928 film

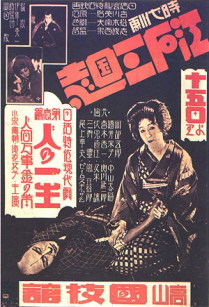
- Japanese movie poster
- Directed by: Seika Shiba
- Produced by: Nikkatsu
- Distributed by: Nikkatsu
- Release dates: 1 March 1928 (part I); 5 May 1928 (part II); 3 August 1928 (part III)
- Country: Japan
- Language: silent

Edo Sangokushi (江戸三国志, Edo Sangokushi) a.k.a. The Three Patriots of Edo is a 1928 black-and-white silent Japanese film directed by Seika Shiba.
