= Taishō Katsuei =

Japanese film studio

Taishō Katsuei (大正活映) was a Japanese film studio active in the early 1920s. Founded in April 1920 by Ryōzō Asano, the son of Asano zaibatsu head Sōichirō Asano, it was mostly known as Taikatsu for short.

== History ==
The studio’s origins can be traced back to Tōyō Film (also known as the "Sunrise Film Manufacturing Company"), a venture started in 1918 by Benjamin Brodsky and Thomas Kurihara, that Asano ended up supporting.

The Taikatsu studio was located in Yokohama, below the Bluff and the Foreigner's Cemetery (a memorial tablet currently marks the site).

Taikatsu did not last long, since it did not have enough theaters to recoup the costs of production and of importing American films. Its production division was taken over by Shōchiku in 1922, even though the company lasted a few more years as an exhibition business.

== Ethos ==
With Kurihara as the main director and Jun'ichirō Tanizaki as the literary consultant, Taikatsu was one of two studios founded in 1920 (the other being Shōchiku Kinema) that publicly announced their intention to make "pure films" in line with the Pure Film Movement.

== Influence ==
The studio established an actors school and began production with Amateur Club, a film directed by Kurihara and scripted by Tanizaki that was strongly influenced by American cinema. Other important works include A Serpent's Lust, another Kurihara-Tanizaki collaboration based on the same story as Ugetsu by Kenji Mizoguchi.

A number of important film figures emerged from Taikatsu, including the directors Tomu Uchida and Buntarō Futagawa and the actors Tokihiko Okada, Ureo Egawa and Atsushi Watanabe. Otohiko Matsukata, who served as a director, later became the president of Nikkatsu.
