= Tsumasaburō Bandō =

Japanese actor (1901–1953)

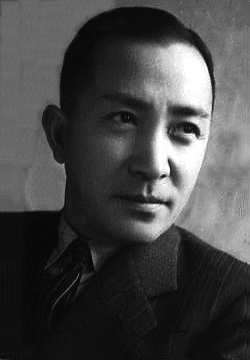
- Born: Denkichi Tamura; December 14, 1901; Kodenmacho Nihonbashi, Tokyo, Japan
- Died: July 7, 1953 (aged 51); Japan
- Occupation: film actor
- Years active: 1923–1953
- Children: Takahiro Tamura; Masakazu Tamura; Ryo Tamura

Tsumasaburō "Bantsuma" Bandō (阪東 妻三郎, Bandō Tsumasaburō; December 14, 1901 – July 7, 1953) was one of the most prominent Japanese actors of the twentieth century. Famous for his rebellious, sword fighting roles in many jidaigeki silent films, he rose to fame after joining the Tōjiin Studio of Makino Film Productions in Kyoto in 1923.

== Life ==
=== Early life ===
Bantsuma, birth name Denkichi Tamura, was born in Kodenmachō, Nihonbashi, Tokyo. Bantsuma's father, a cotton wholesaler named Chōgorō, lived till the age of 71 but his mother, older brother, and sister died when he was young. He attended Jisshi Elementary School (which stands next to the former site of Denma-chō Prison where many the loyal supporters of the Emperor, whom he frequently played in his films, were deeply involved). At school, he was often the leader of the pack and was actively involved in plays. While performing in a school play, Bantsuma froze on stage, unable to recite his lines. Embarrassed, he ran off and stayed in his room, weeping for 10 days. It is said that during this time, he vowed to become someone who would be admired by all.

After the death of his mother, his father's business soon went bankrupt and Bantsuma was unable to continue his education. After finishing elementary school, he became an apprentice and pupil to Kataoka Nizaemon, a famous kabuki actor. However, in the world of kabuki, lineage was extremely important and Bantsuma struggled to gain fame. He soon changed his artistic direction by joining small theaters and taking small roles at Kokkatsu production firm. In 1922, with Kichimatsu Nakamura, he formed the “Bando Tsumasaburo Troupe,” but it was disbanded very quickly. In 1923, Bantsuma and Kichimatsu were scouted into the film industry by Makino Film Studio.

=== Early film career ===
Once he joined Makino Film Productions, he began to build a celebrated career as an actor. It was during this period that he became best friends with Rokuhei Susukita, a script writer who wrote almost a hundred scripts for the Makino studio. He introduced complex plot lines, exhilarating action sequences, and unruly anarchy to jidaigeki films, very much in the style of American films. Rokuhei subsequently selected Bantsuma to debut in his film Gyakuryu in 1924, a story about a poor, low-rank samurai whose life is turned upside down by his enemy. In 1925, Bantsuma starred in Kageboshi, another screenplay written by Rokuhei, this time depicting the life of the ‘jovial thief’, Kageboshi.

=== Bantsuma: The Producer ===
At the height of his fame, Bantsuma established his own agency in the summer of 1925. It was the first independent production company to be headed by a film star in the history of Japanese cinema. Bantsuma owned most of the rights and would go through the specific scenes and details with the directors. He is said to have been very demanding but his colleagues have explained that this was merely a reflection of his eager and enthusiastic approach to making films. During this time, Bantsuma practically lived in Gion being entertained by geisha. It is also well known that he liked to flaunt his cash and he often treated his co-workers to a night in Gion with sometimes up to 20 geisha in one room. In 1926 Bantsuma built a studio outside Kyoto where the Toei Kyoto studio now stands.

By far the most controversial film made under Bantsuma Productions was its second production, Orochi (1925). The story revolves around the protagonist, Heizaburo Kuritomi, an honorable but low-class samurai who is given an emotional depth, previously unseen in jidaigeki films, as he battles with inner conflict and the injustices of society. This is especially evident in the closing sequence of the film where the protagonist is dragged away by his enemies after his tremendous effort to protect his love. In the essay, "Bantsuma's 'New Breeze'", Midori Sawato cites the ending of Orochi as one of the most 'heroic and heart-crushing' images she has seen. In the past, the heroes of the films were proud samurai of the upper classes who always triumphed over their evil opponents, upholding what was truly right in the world. However, Orochi was created in response to the national and military fanaticism that was prevailing at the time.

With its now-famous opening lines:

‘Not all those who wear the name of villain, are truly evil men. Not all those who are respected as noble men, are worthy of the name. Many are those who wear a false mask of benevolence to hide their treachery and the wickedness of their true selves,’

the film evoked provocative ideologies and rebellious ideas during a time when liberal performers and writers were being repressed throughout Japan. Consequently, the film was severely censored with over 20% of its content being completely cut out and several scenes having to be re-shot. When the film was finally released, the hype around its creation resulted in crowds flocking to theaters all around the country. Bantsuma's exhilarating new sword fighting style he displayed in the film may have attracted audiences but it cannot be denied that there were many who were also deeply touched by the profound message of the film.

Bantsuma went on to produce many films under his production company, but Orochi was the only one he personally kept the negative for. His agency hit a low point during the period 1931–1935. During this time, his production company was very much a ‘one-man agency’, where the directors were only acting to please Bantsuma. His acting skills gradually became old and outdated so his films did not do very well. In 1935, Bantsuma worked with the renowned director Hiroshi Inagaki in his first talkie film, Niino Tsuruchiyo (1935), but his rather feeble voice was unpopular with the audience. It seemed that Bantsuma's luck was running out and in 1936 he closed the doors of his agency once and for all, and joined Nikkatsu Production Company in 1937.

=== Bantsuma: The Swordsman ===
Bantsuma's films, particularly his earlier works, would not be complete without the fast-paced sword fighting scenes that always guaranteed to raise the heart rate of his audience. Fighting styles had always been set, especially in Kabuki performances and actors were limited to doing standard moves such as the 'Yamagata', 'Yanagi', or the 'Chijihataka'. However, with the emergence of Bantsuma this changed and he introduced a completely new style which was unique to him alone. Ryu Kuze, a sword fighting coach analyzed Bantsuma's technique and put his uniqueness down to the fact that he does not look at his victims when he slays them. Instead, he is already focused on his next victim. Ryu Kuze also pointed out that Bantsuma would stand straight with his ankles lined up which was his signature pose that signaled death for his opponent. His colleagues often spoke of their admiration for Bantsuma's enthusiasm and quick ability to pick up new moves and sequences. Bantsuma's spectacular sword skills soon earned him the title, ‘The King of Swordfights.’

=== Bantsuma: The Writer ===
Bantsuma's first son, Takahiro Tamura, described his father as ‘sensitive’ and affected by everything occurring around him. He wrote several articles for magazines such as Bantsuma Cinema News and displayed his sensitivity, as well as giving the audience an insight into his mentality.

In the November 1929 issue of Bantsuma Cinema News, he wrote, ‘The life of an artist is to die for art. Only when art is one’s life can one produce real art. As I have a long way to go, I will continue down this path while with such belief.’

His determination and dedication in what he did is evident in the statement he made in the February 1930 issue of the same magazine. He wrote,

‘When creating such a film, I am not an actor, but actually am in the shoes of the character in the film, feeling what he feels, and I suffer the same agony as that character. I must play numerous characters and their diverse personalities one after another. I am no God. Sometimes I feel myself screaming inside…you cannot claim with confidence that you are speaking the mind of the character with only a half-developed understanding of that character. Being able to fully depict the character comes only after bleeding and suffering in agony in the process.’

=== Family life ===
Bantsuma and his wife Shizuko Tamura had four sons together — Takahiro Tamura, Masakazu Tamura, Ryō Tamura, and Toshima Tamura. Three followed in their father's footsteps, launching careers in the movie industry. Toshima became a businessperson.

His first son, Takahiro Tamura (who died on 16 May 2006 from a cerebral infarction), often spoke fondly about his father in interviews and gave valuable insights.

The family often spent their summers at the beach in Amanohashidate and, as Takahiro recalled, Bantsuma would splash around in the water, even more excited than his brothers. He also spoke of the memory of his father's reaction to the results of his junior high school examination. Too nervous to go to the school and check, the good news was delivered by the teacher. Takahiro distinctly remembered his father bounding down the stairs and bowing in front of the teacher till his forehead touched the floor, almost as if shooting a scene from one of his jidaigeki films.

Many people think that Bantsuma's true nature can be seen in Yabure Daiko (1949), where he plays the role of a tyrannical man feared by his family. He was the complete opposite, always putting his family first. The role he played in Abare Jishi of a father who would do anything for his children is a more accurate representation of Bantsuma, who was an affectionate and well-rounded family man. However, Bantsuma's dedication to his work was also strong, and he returned to the set, ready to work, the day after his wedding.

=== Later film career ===
It seems that Bantsuma's sensitivity was beginning to make its way into the work he was producing. A year after entering Nikkatsu, Bantsuma co-starred with Kataoka Chiezo in the all-star film, Chushingura (1938). Playing the role of Kuranosuke Oishi, Bantsuma displayed his perfected acting skills with his powerful performance. Then in 1943 he starred in the film Muho matsu no Issho, playing a poor rickshaw man. It was a role that would not normally have been taken on by such a great star but director Hiroshi Inagaki, whom Bantsuma had previously worked with, was determined to get him on board. After initially turning down the role, Bantsuma finally agreed and went on to play a role with a profound humanistic approach that lent great depth to both the character and the movie. In preparation for the role of the poor rickshaw man, Bantsuma stayed in character even whilst at home. His first son, Takahiro Tamura described watching his father eat dried fish and drink sake in the style of the character of the film.

During this period of his career, Japan soon lost the war and the US army began to restrict Jidaigeki as a ‘hotbed of feudalism.’ Thus, the stars of Jidaigeki formed troupes and traveled around the country. During this time, Bantsuma perfected his skills further and in 1948 he peaked once again with his performance in the film Ōshō. Director Daisuke Itō spoke of Bantsuma's wide range and depth, his convincing and humanistic portrayal of the protagonist, and stated that despite his big status in the film industry, Bantsuma was the obvious choice for the part of Sankichi, a man of the lowest social ranks.

On 7 July 1953, Bantsuma died at the age of 51 of cerebral hemorrhage while filming Abare-Jishi. A grave has been built in his memory in Nisonin, Kyoto and Bantsuma lives on through the continued popularity of his films and the impact he made to the history of Japanese cinema.

== Filmography ==
- Kosuzume Toge (1923, Director: Numata Koroku)
- Gyakuryu (1924, Director: Buntaro Futagawa)
- Kageboshi (1925, Director: Buntaro Futagawa)
- Orochi (1925, Director: Buntaro Futagawa)
- Ranto no Chimata (1926, Director: Yasuda Kempo)
- Chizome no Jujika (1927, Director: Norikuni Yasuda)
- Sakamoto Ryoma (1928, Director: Edamasa Yoshiro)
- Karasu-gumi (1930, Director: Minoru Inuzuka)
- Koina no Ginpei, Yuki no Wataridori (1931, Director: Tomikazu Miyata)
- Sunae Shibari-Morio Jushiro (1935, Director: Minoru Inuzuka)
- Niino Tsuruchiyo (1935, Director: Ito Daisuke)
- Chikemuri Takadanobaba (1937, Director: Hiroshi Inagaki)
- Chushingura (1938, Director: Makino Masahiro, Ikeda Tomiyasu)
- Mazo (1938, Director: Hiroshi Inagaki)
- Zoku Mazo-Ibara Ukon (1939, Hiroshi Inagaki)
- Tsubanari Ronin (1939, Director: Ryohei Arai)
- Zoku Tsubanari Ronin (1940, Director: Ryohei Arai)
- Muhomatsu no issho (1943, Director: Inagaki Hiroshi)
- Noroshi wa Shanghai ni agaru (1944, Director: Hiroshi Inagaki, Feng Yuek)
- Tokai Suikoden (1945, Director: Hiroshi Inagaki, Daisuke Itō)
- Suronin Makaritoru (1947, Director: Daisuke Itō)
- Tsukinode no Ketto (1947, Director: Santaro Marune)
- Oushou (1948, Director: Daisuke Itō)
- Yabure-daiko (1949, Director: Keisuke Kinoshita)
- Oboro Kago (1951, Director: Daisuke Itō)
- Oedo Go-nin Otoko (1951, Director: Daisuke Itō)
- Inazuma Soshi (1951, Director: Hiroshi Inagaki)
- Abare-jishi (1953, Director: Osone Tatsuo)

== See also ==
- Jidaigeki
- Benshi
- Cinema of Japan
