= Buntarō Futagawa =

Japanese film director and writer

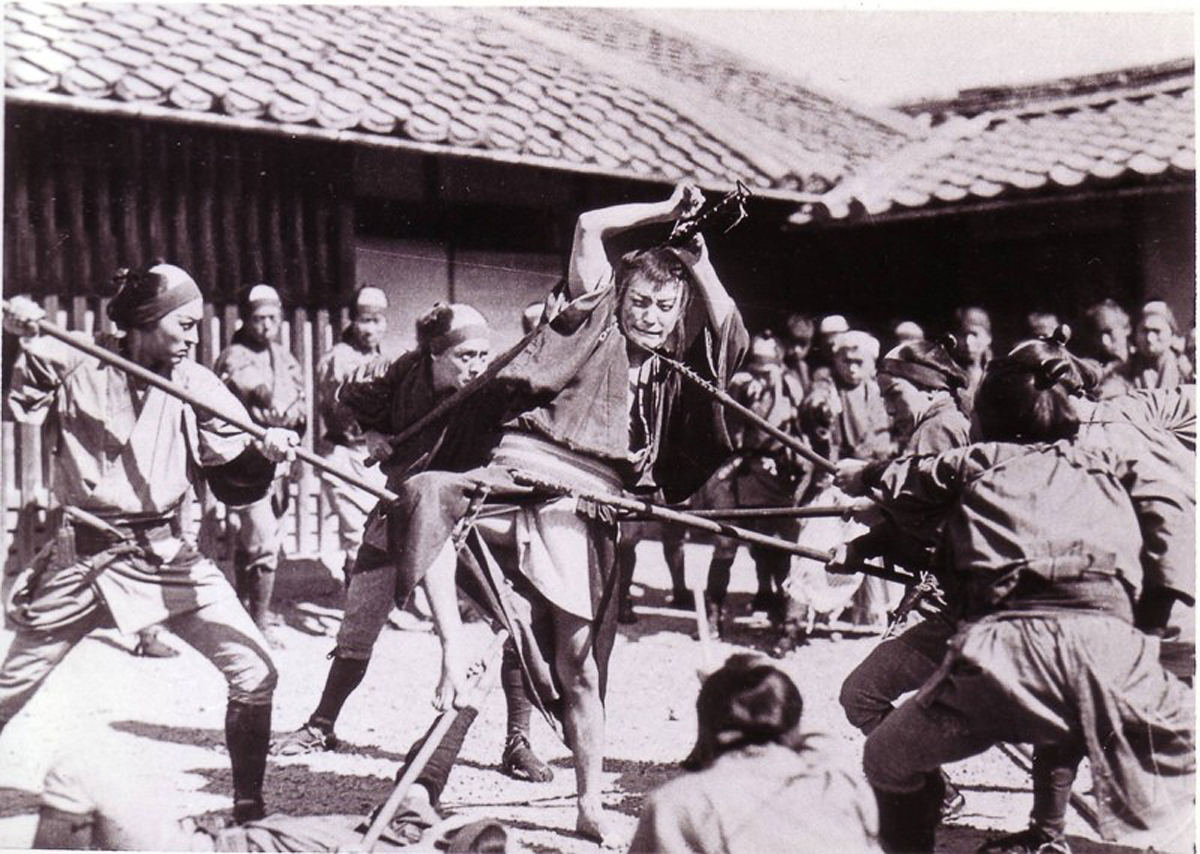
Futagawa directed Orochi when he was 26 years old.

Buntarō Futagawa (二川 文太郎, Futagawa Buntarō, 18 June 1899 – 28 March 1966) was a pioneering Japanese film director and writer. So far, only two of his works have been released on DVD: Orochi (Japanese: 雄呂血, The Serpent, 1925) and the short film Backward Flow (Japanese: 逆流, Gyakuryū, 1924). As a writer, he used another name: Otsuma Shinozuka (Japanese: 紫之塚 乙馬).

== Life ==
Futagawa was born Kichinosuke Takizawa on 18 June 1899, in Misaki, Shiba, Tokyo (present-day Mita, Minato, Tokyo), to a family of tea merchants. His younger brother by three years was film director Eisuke Takizawa.

He studied business at Chuo University, but dropped out to join Taishō Katsuei in Yokohama in April 1921.

In the silent era, Futagawa worked with actor Tsumasaburō Bandō.
