= Sendō Kouta =

"Sendō Kouta" (船頭小唄; "Boatman's Ballad") is a Japanese kayōkyoku song originally published as sheet music in 1921 under the common name of "Karesusuki" (枯れすすき; "Withered Pampas"), receiving its current title in 1922. The lyrics were written by Ujō Noguchi and the melody was composed by Shinpei Nakayama. It was popular throughout Japan from at least 1921 to 1923.

In 1922 and 1923, several record companies recorded and released "Sendō Kouta". In the latter year, Yoshinobu Ikeda's low-budget film based on the song was released, adding to the song's popularity. After the 1923 Great Kantō earthquake, the song's popularity spread further throughout Japan to the point that the public blamed the song for the disaster. The song was recorded by Victor Records in 1928.
