= Henry Kotani =

Japanese film director and cinematographer (1887–1972)

Henry Kotani 小谷ヘンリー
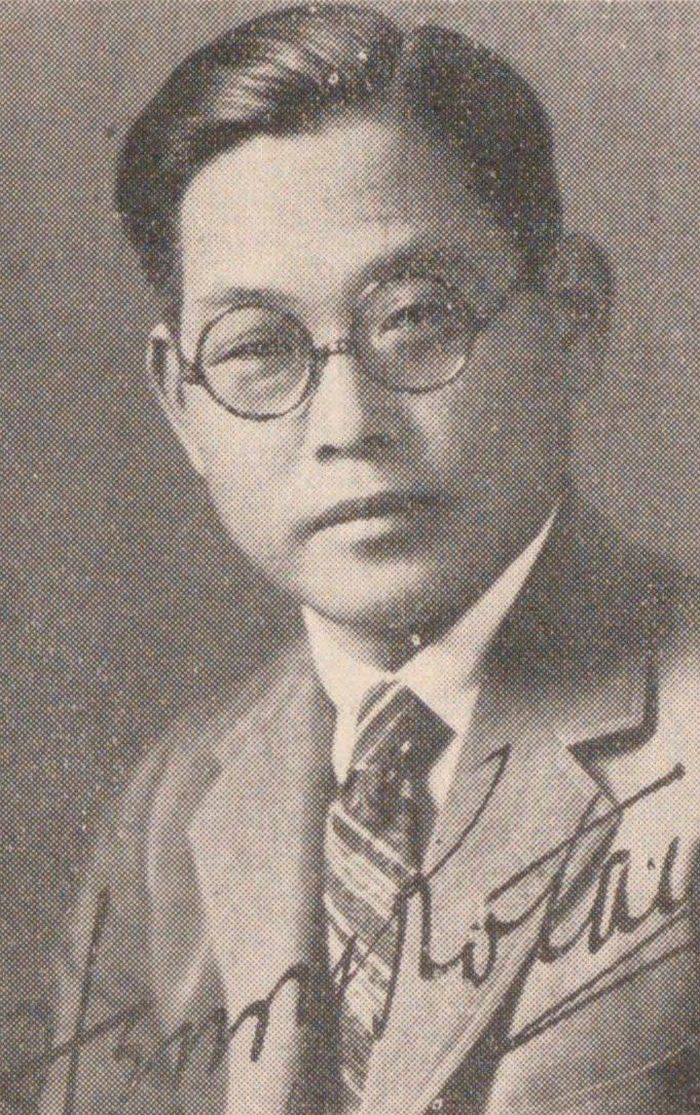
- Born: 25 April 1887; Hiroshima Prefecture
- Died: 8 April 1972 (aged 84)
- Other names: Kuraichi Kotani
- Occupations: film director, cinematographer

Henry Kotani (小谷ヘンリー, Kotani Henrī; 25 April 1887 – 8 April 1972) was a pioneering Japanese film director and cinematographer.

== Career ==
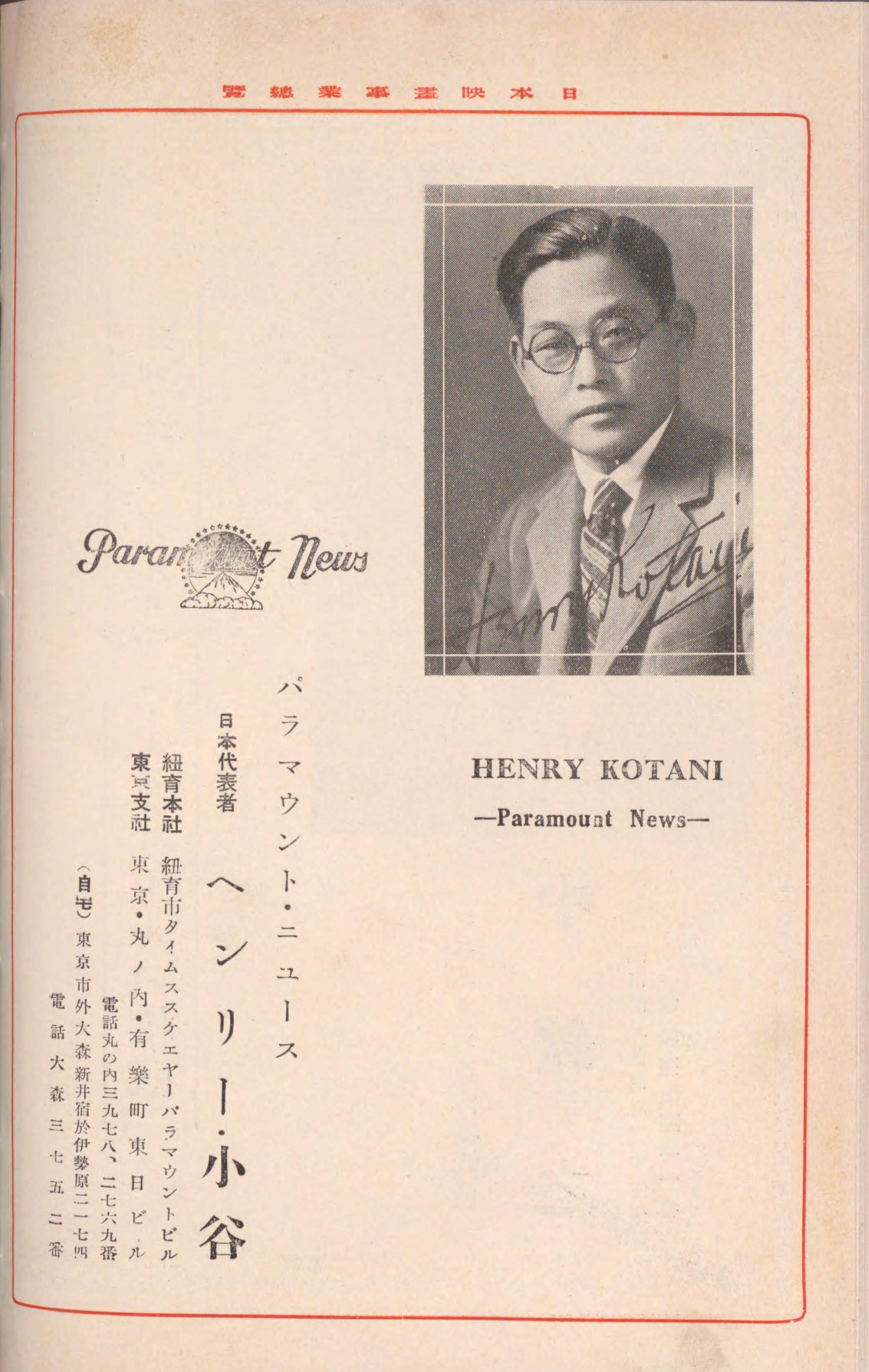
Henry Kotani in a 1930 ad for Paramount News

Born Kuraichi Kotani in Hiroshima Prefecture, Kotani emigrated to the United States with his parents when he was still a boy. Graduating from high school, he began working as an actor and cinematographer under the name Henry Kotani in Hollywood, particularly at Famous Players Lasky. He frequently worked on Donald Crisp's films. In 1920, on the recommendation of Cecil B. DeMille, the newly formed Shōchiku film company hired Kotani and brought him back to Japan. There he directed and photographed Shōchiku's first film, Shima no onna in 1920, and in 1921 wrote, directed and photographed Gubijinsō, the first film of the star actress Sumiko Kurishima. His career at Shōchiku did not last long, but he helped establish the modern visual style of Shōchiku's output and raise cinematographers such as Michio Midorikawa. He later became head of the East Asian bureau of Paramount News. In recognition of his contributions, he was given a lifetime achievement award at the Mainichi Film Awards in 1960.

== Selected filmography ==
=== As cinematographer ===
- Believe Me, Xantippe (1918)
- The Goat (1918)
- Jane Goes A-Wooing (1919)
- Mrs. Temple's Telegram (1920)

=== As director ===
- Shima no onna (島の女) (1920)
- Gubijinsō (虞美人草) (1921)

=== As actor ===
- The Wrath of the Gods (1914)
- The Geisha (1914)
- The Typhoon (1914)
- The Sable Lorcha (1915)
