= Midori Sawato =

Japanese silent film narrator

Midori Sawato (澤登 翠, Sawato Midori) is a Japanese benshi or katsuben (Note: Both words are derived from the Japanese katsudō-benshi (活動弁士), though film scholar J. L. Anderson notes on the difference between these terms: "Most other foreign-language discussions call a katsuben a benshi, which is a vague term meaning speaker or orator. Katsuben clearly denotes the person who performed with motion pictures.") (silent film narrator).

== Life ==
Originally from Tokyo, Midori Sawato graduated from the Department of Philosophy, Hosei University. She first decided she wanted to become a benshi in 1972, when she saw the silent film The Water Magician by Kenji Mizoguchi. She was particularly impressed with the performance as benshi of the man who would become her teacher, Shunsui Matsuda. After studying under Matsuda, Sawato made her debut in 1973. She is an active benshi who has garnered high praise through her wide variety of activities and performances in Japan and overseas. Of the ten benshi working in Japan (as of 2012), Sawato is considered the most famous.

Her repertoire of over 500 films includes genres as varied as contemporary cinema, historical movies and western films, for which she provides well-formed interpretations of the work. She has received many awards, including the Award for Excellence in the field of Dramatic Performance at the Agency for Cultural Affairs Arts Festival, for her contributions toward promoting katsuben as modern entertainment, in addition to being a valuable presence carrying on the tradition of katsuben as a Japanese storytelling art.

As is traditional for benshi, she often gives an introduction before the film to explain the historical and cultural differences of old films and provide background on the actors and directors. She does not use any modern vocabulary for films that have old titles.

Besides katsuben, she is involved in activities such as film critiques and essay writing. She is the author of Katsudo benshi: Sekai o kakeru (transl. "Film benshi across the world").

She was the recipient of the Japan Film Critics Golden Glory Award in 1995. In the same year in October, she received wide acclaim for her katsuben performance for Ito Daisuke's A Diary of Chuji's Travels. In December 1998, a katsuben recital was organized to commemorate the 25th year of her career. In November 2000, she received the Special Award of the Yamaji Fumiko Culture Institute. Films with her narration are regularly aired on CS and NHK.

== Performances ==
=== Performances abroad ===
- 1988 - Invited to the Avignon Art Festival in France and performed as benshi for several films of Bando Tsumasaburo
- 1989 - Invited to the United States by New York Japan Society, American Museum of the Moving Image, etc. and performs katsuben in New York and three other cities
- 1990 - Invited by the Japan Cultural Institute in Rome and Pordenone Silent Film Festival and performs in Italy
- 1990 - Performs at the Antwerp International Film Festival in Belgium
- 1991 - Performs at the Voice Festival in the Netherlands sponsored by the Rotterdam Arts Society
- 1992 - Performs in Los Angeles
- 1994 - Performs at the Oberhausen Short Film Festival in Germany
- February 1995 - Invited to and performs at the Picture Drama Festival in Evreux, France
- September 1995 - Performs The Water Magician at the Museum of Contemporary Art in Sydney, Australia
- December 1995 - Performs in Sao Paulo, Brazil
- October 2001 - Performs Orochi at the Silent Film Festival in Sacile, Italy
- September 2002 - Invited to the Pacific Film Archive at the University of California, Berkeley, where she performed The Water Magician and A Diary of Chuji's Travels
- October 2003 - Performs I Was Born, But... at the 39th Annual Chicago International Film Festival.
- April 2004 - Performs The Water Magician at the 6th Women's Film Festival in Seoul, South Korea
- April 2004 - Performs at four venues in Boston and Portsmouth including Boston University, Tufts University, and Harvard Film Archive
- July 2004 - Performs at the San Francisco Silent Film Festival
- November 2004 - Performs with the Honolulu Symphony Orchestra in Hawaii

=== Other activities ===
- Performs in Kaizo Hayashi's Yume miru yoni nemuritai (To Sleep so as to Dream) and Nijusseiki shonen dokuhon (Circus Boy)
- Many works being shown with Sawato's katsuben on the NHK BS2 channel
- Made regular appearances as an interviewer on the "Movies I Grew Up With" corner of the NHK show "Seikatsu Hot Morning" until March 2005

== Awards ==
- 2002 Received the Award for Excellence in the field of Dramatic Performance at the Agency for Cultural Affairs Arts Festival
- 2000 Received the 21st Special Award of Yamaji Fumiko Culture Institute
- 1995 Received the Japan Film Critics Golden Glory Award
- 1990 Received the Japan Film Pen Club Award
