= Yoneko Sakai =

Japanese actress

- 酒井米子
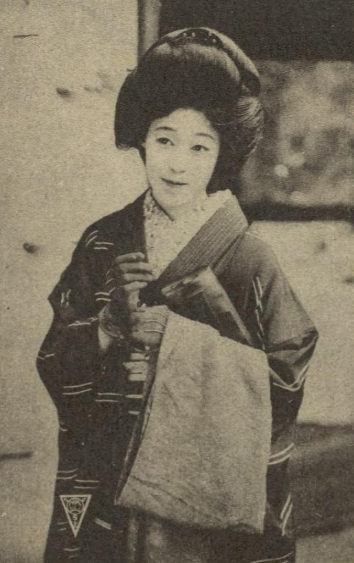
- Yoneko Sakai in 1935
- Born: November 25, 1898; Tokyo, Japan
- Died: October 15, 1958
- Other names: Sakai Yoneko
- Occupation: Actress

Yoneko Sakai (November 25, 1898 – October 15, 1958; in Japanese, 酒井米子; in kana, さかい よねこ) was a Japanese actress on stage and in silent films, known for playing "vamp" roles.

== Career ==
Sakai began her acting career as a girl, appearing in a George Bernard Shaw play at age twelve. She began acting in films in 1920. She appeared in more than 100 silent films, and several more films in the sound era. She joined the Nikkatsu studio, and worked with directors including Eijiro Nagatomi, Tsuji Kichiro, Murata Minoru, Daisuke Itō and Kenji Mizoguchi. Her last film was Kyobyô den (1938).

Sakai was considered a "film star". She was featured in historical period stories, and was known for playing "vamp" roles. She traveled to Korea to meet fans there. She modeled gowns for Japanese department stores.

== Personal life ==
Sakai had a son and a daughter. She died in 1958, at the age of 59.
