= Orochi (film) =

1925 film

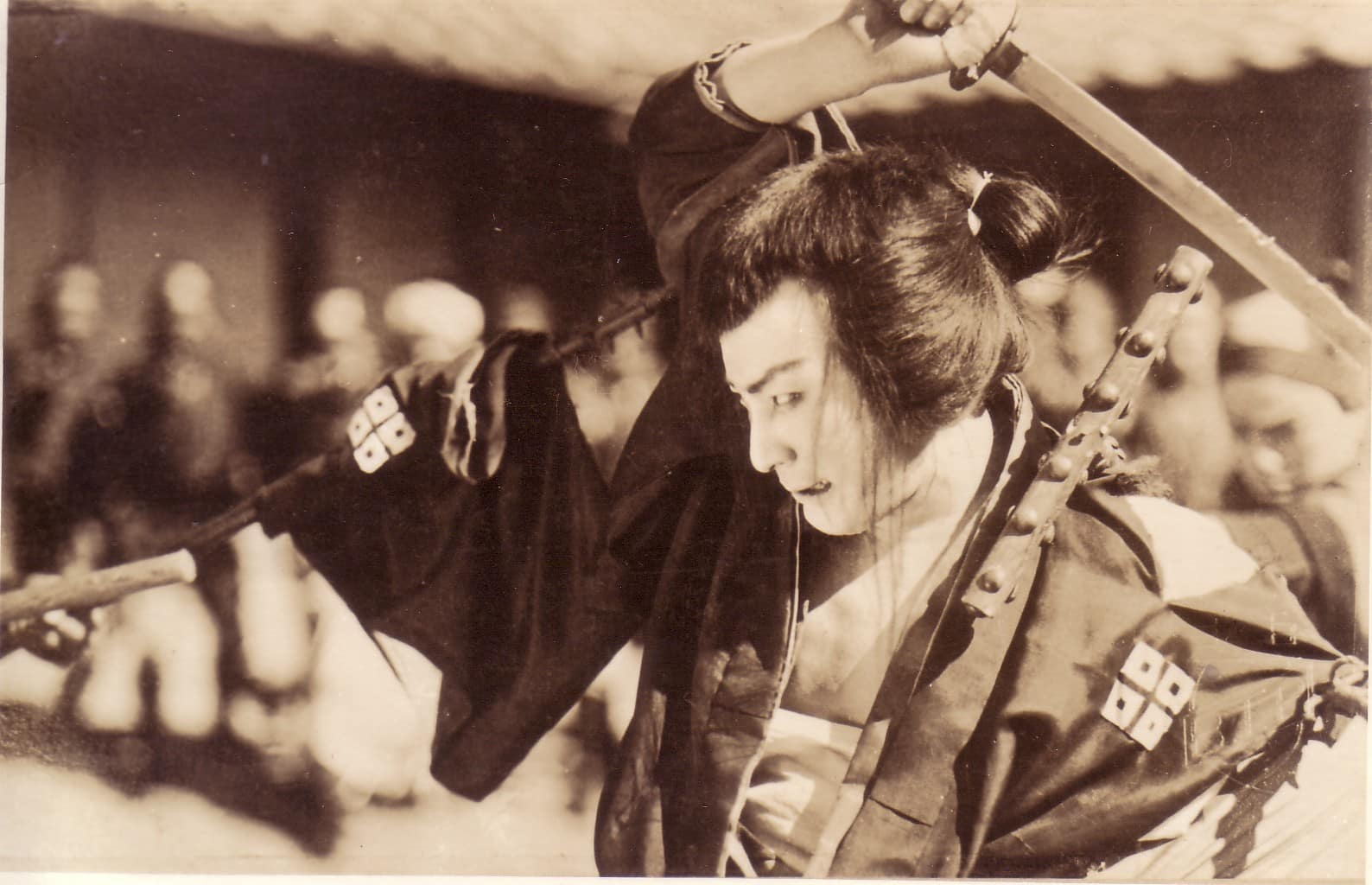
- Scene from Orochi
- Directed by: Buntarō Futagawa
- Starring: Tsumasaburō Bandō; Misao Seki; Utako Tamaki; Kensaku Haruji
- Cinematography: Seizō Ishino
- Distributed by: Digital Meme
- Release date: 1925 (Japan)
- Running time: 74 minutes
- Country: Japan
- Language: Silent film Japanese intertitles

Orochi (雄呂血, Orochi) is a 1925 black and white Japanese silent film with benshi accompaniment directed by Buntarō Futagawa. It is the most popular and beloved film of Tsumasaburō Bandō, featuring the star at the height of his fame.

== Synopsis ==
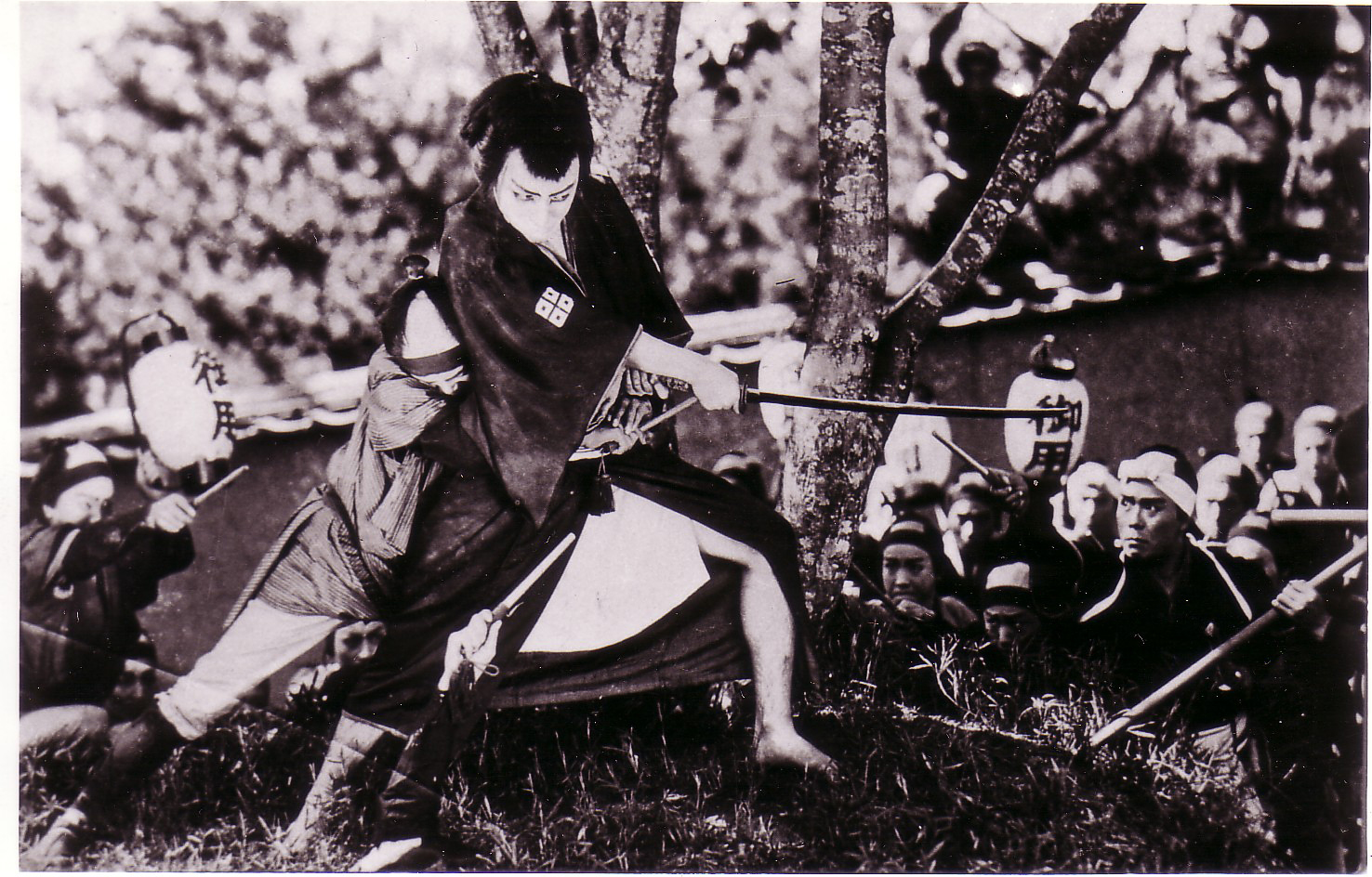
The climax scene.

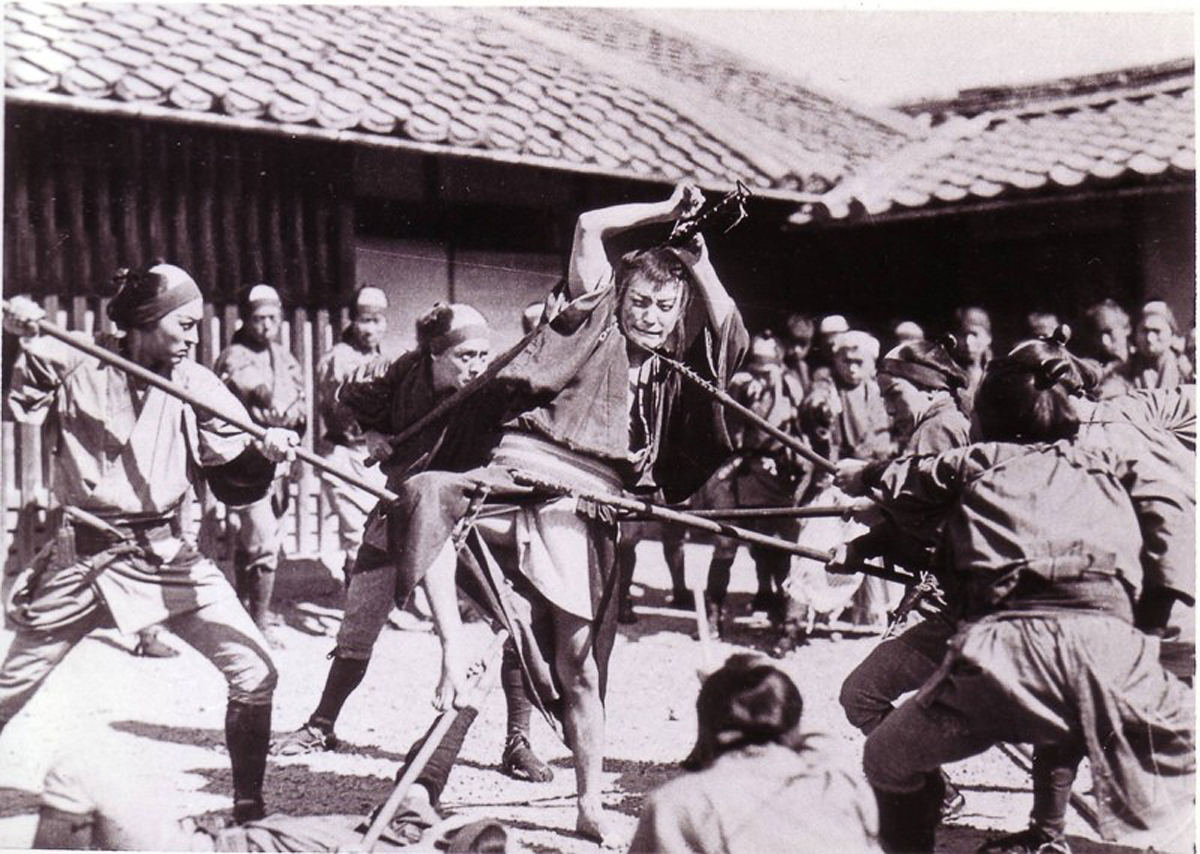
Big turn around set in a town

The film tells the story of a samurai who falls on hard times due to misunderstandings and explains the plots of his enemies. Such explanations superbly depict the absurdity of the samurai's unjust world, making this work pertinent even today.

== Analysis ==
The kinetic sword fighting scenes masterfully performed by Bandō were novel in an age when kabuki-style, leisurely and dignified movies were the norm. This style was passed onto modern chambara films. Additionally, the sword fighting style's aesthetic value is slightly lost in Orochi due to the pace at which the fight scenes were filmed (fast-forward motion). Due to the kabuki style, the makeup on the characters transformed them into almost identical representations of ukiyo-e (woodblock prints), a major Japanese art form.

== Title ==
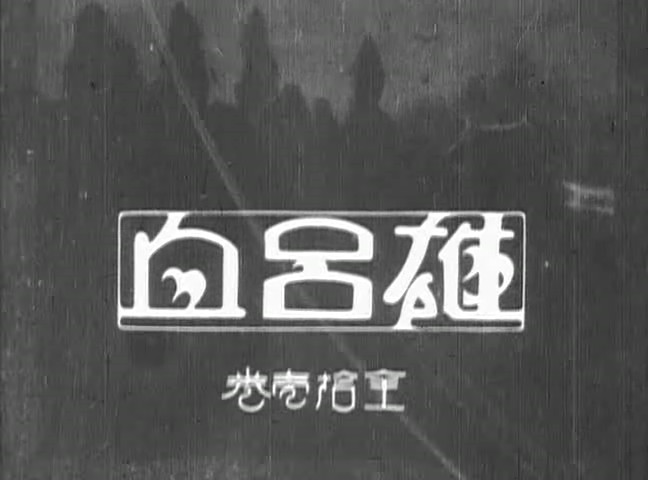
Title screen of Orochi

The original title of the movie was supposed to be "Outlaw," but the Japanese censors and police banned it, because the depiction of an outlaw as a hero was seen as very dangerous. The title was later changed to "Serpent," describing how Bando Tsumasaburo wiggles when he fights back and how, even in death, a serpent looks terrifying. Confused, the censors allowed the title.

== Reception ==
The British Film Institute listed Orochi as the best Japanese film of 1925, praising Tsumasaburō Bandō's "haunting performance" and the "stylishly choreographed action climax".
