= Shinpei Takagi (actor, born 1902) =

Japanese actor (1902–1967)

- 高木 新平
- Born: 3 November 1902; Shimosuwa, Nagano, Japan
- Died: 21 April 1967 (aged 64)
- Occupation: Actor
- Years active: 1923-1961

Shinpei Takagi (高木 新平, Takagi Shinpei; 3 November 1902 – 21 April 1967) was a Japanese film actor. He appeared in more than 100 films from 1923 to 1961.

== Career ==
Takagi joined the acting school at Nikkatsu in 1920 but made his mark first at Makino Film Productions as a samurai film action star known for his speed and ability to do stunts. He started his own company, Takagi Shinpei Productions, in 1927 and directed one of his own films. He later moved from one company to the next before settling down as a supporting actor in the postwar years. He is most known outside Japan for playing the bandit chief in Akira Kurosawa's Seven Samurai.

== Filmography ==
Year	Title	Role	Notes
1922	Sôzen-ji baba		
1923	Shinkinô		
1923	Mêgumarezarû otoko		
1923	Kaiketsu taka		
1923	Aru hi no Ôishi		
1924	Yuri keiji		
1924	Samuari jinshichî torimonochô		
1924	Dûnujîn nihen		
1924	Dokujin sanpen		
1924	Dôkujîn ippen		
1924	Chi ni kuruu mono		
1924	Awâmeshî no takerû ma		
1924	Sakurada kaikyoroku	Sôsuke Inada	
1924	Gekkyûbi no yoru no dekigoto		
1924	Sohto	Sam	
1924	Jinkô - Zempen		
1924	Jinkô - Kôhen		
1924	Robinfuddo no yume	Robin Hood	
1924	Sengoku jidai: Dai ippen		
1925	Sannin shimai: sanpen		
1925	Sannin shimai: ippen		
1925	Sannin shimai: chuhen		
1925	Rantô: zenpen		
1925	Oranda yashikî: zenpen		
1925	Nânimono: zenpen		
1925	Nânimono: kôhen		
1925	Kengeki		
1925	Kaibutsu: zenpen		
1925	Kaibutsu: kôhen		
1925	Izukô e kaeru		
1925	Hakumenki		
1925	Sengoku jidai: Dai nihen		
1925	Saheiji torimonochô: Kaibutsu - Zempen	Hanshirô Takeichi / Ginzaburô / Human Ape	
1925	Sengoku jidai: Dai sanpen		
1925	Saheiji torimonochô: Kaibutsu - Kôhen	Human Ape / Ginzaburô / Hanshirô	
1925	Edo kaizoku-den: Kagebôshi: zenpen	Jûta Nagareboshi	
1925	Edo kaizoku den kagebôshi: kôhen	Jûta Nagareboshi	
1925	Rakka no mai zenpen	Komasa	
1925	Rakka no mai: Kôhen	Komasa	
1925	Nambanji no Kaijin: zenpen		
1926	Ogatâ Hansaburô		
1926	Kaette kita eiyu, zenpen		
1926	Kaette kita eiyu, kôhen		
1926	Nambanji no kaijin: Kôhen		
1928	Hakuryu odoru kaiketsuhen		
1928	Hakuryu odoru daisanpen		
1928	Hakuryu odoru dainihen		
1928	Hakuryu odoru daiipen		
1928	Saheiji torimonochô: Nazo - Kôhen		
1930	Ûra omote koi no kârakurî		
1930	Edojo sozeme		
1933	Kâkakuri dainagon		
1933	Kaiketsu arahoshi keiketsuhen		
1933	Kaiketsu arahoshi: zenpen		
1934	Sora no senkôtei		
1949	Gokumon-jima - Kaimei-hen	Detective Yamada	
1954	Seven Samurai	Bandit Chieftain	
1957	Throne of Blood	Commander	
1957	Mito kômon		
1959	The Manster	Temple Priest	special effects
1961	Marine Kong	Marine Kong	
1961	Yojimbo	Ushitora Follower	(final film role)
