= Shūji Sano =

Japanese actor (1912–1978)

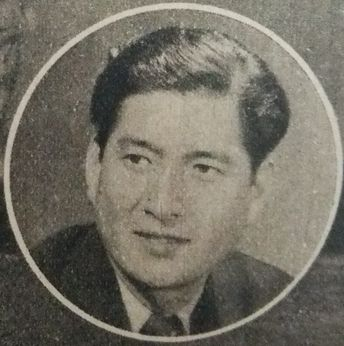
- Shūji Sano ca. 1948
- Born: Sekiguchi Shōsaburō; October 20, 1912
- Died: December 21, 1978 (aged 66)
- Occupation: Actor
- Years active: 1936–1977
- Children: Hiroshi Sekiguchi

Shūji Sano (佐野周二, Sano Shūji; October 10, 1912 – December 21, 1978) was a Japanese actor active from 1936 to 1977. A popular star of the Shōchiku film studios, he is best known for his appearances in the films of Yasujirō Ozu, Keisuke Kinoshita, Heinosuke Gosho and Hiroshi Shimizu.

== Selected filmography ==
- 1936: The New Road (Part one) (新道前篇, Shindo: Zenpen) – dir. Heinosuke Gosho
- 1937: What Did the Lady Forget? (淑女は何を忘れたか, Shukujo wa nani o wasureta ka) – dir. Yasujirō Ozu
- 1937: Konjiki yasha (金色夜叉) – dir. Hiroshi Shimizu
- 1937: Forget Love for Now (恋も忘れて, Koi mo wasurete) – dir. Hiroshi Shimizu
- 1942: There Was a Father (父ありき, Chichi Ariki) – dir. Yasujirō Ozu
- 1944: Army (陸軍, Rikugun) – dir. Keisuke Kinoshita
- 1948: A Hen in the Wind (風の中の牝鶏, Kaze no naka no mendori) – dir. Yasujirō Ozu
- 1949: A Toast to the Young Miss (お嬢さん乾杯, Ojōsan kanpai) – dir. Keisuke Kinoshita
- 1951: Carmen Comes Home (カルメン故郷に帰る, Karumen kokyō ni kaeru) – dir. Keisuke Kinoshita
- 1951: Early Summer (麦秋, Bakushu) – dir. Yasujirō Ozu
- 1953: Mogura Yokochō (もぐら横丁) – dir. Hiroshi Shimizu
- 1954: An Inn at Osaka (大阪の宿, Osaka no yado) – dir. Heinosuke Gosho
- 1954: The Cock Crows Twice (鶏はふたゝび鳴く, Niwatori wa futatabi naku) – dir. Heinosuke Gosho
- 1955: The Moon Has Risen (月は昇りぬ, Tsuki wa noborinu) – dir. Kinuyo Tanaka
- 1955: The Maid's Kid (女中ッ子, Jochūkko) – dir. Tomotaka Tasaka
- 1956: Sudden Rain (驟雨, Shūu) – dir. Mikio Naruse

== Bibliography ==
- 松竹 (Shōchiku), ed. (2002). 小津安二郎 新発見 (Ozu Yasujirō Shinhakken). Tokyo: Kodansha. ISBN 978-4-06-256680-3.
