= Ranko Hanai =

Japanese actress (1918–1961)

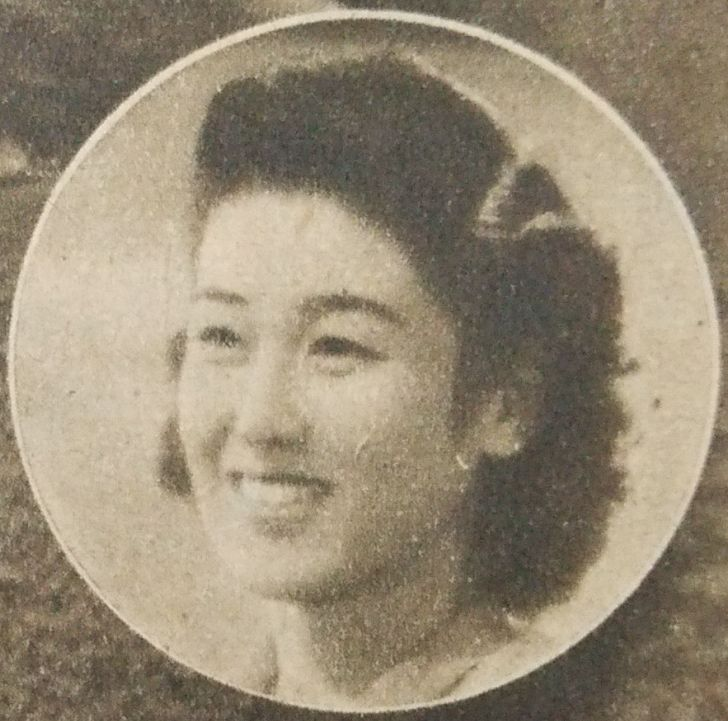
- Ranko Hanai (date unknown)
- Born: Yoshiko Shimizu; 15 July 1918; Osaka, Japan
- Died: 21 May 1961 (aged 42)
- Other name: Reiko Shimizu
- Occupation: Actress
- Years active: 1929-1961

Ranko Hanai (花井蘭子, Hanai Ranko; 15 July 1918 – 21 May 1961) was a Japanese actress who appeared in about 200 films between 1929 and 1961.

== Biography ==
Hanai was born Yoshiko Shimizu in Osaka, Japan. As a child, she acted with the theatre troupes of Takeo Kawai and Rokurō Kitamura, and gave her screen debut under the name of Reiko Shimizu in 1929. She entered the Nikkatsu film studio in 1931 and moved to J. O. Sutajio (later Toho) in 1937. In 1946, in opposition to the union strike at Toho, Yamada sided with the anti-unionist group "Jū hito no hata no kai" ("Society of the Flag of Ten"), which consisted of Setsuko Hara, Hideko Takamine, Isuzu Yamada and others, and joined the Shintoho studio. During the 1950s, she also occasionally worked for Toho and other production companies, appearing in films of Mikio Naruse, Heinosuke Gosho, Kinuyo Tanaka and Kaneto Shindō. She died in 1961 at the age of 42.

== Selected filmography ==
- The Million Ryo Pot (1935, dir. Sadao Yamanaka)
- Fallen Blossoms (1938, dir. Tamizō Ishida)
- Sanshiro Sugata (1943, dir. Akira Kurosawa)
- Ginza Cosmetics (1951, dir. Mikio Naruse)
- Repast (1951, dir. Mikio Naruse)
- Life of a Woman (1953, dir Kaneto Shindō)
- Love Letter (1953, dir. Kinuyo Tanaka)
- Where Chimneys Are Seen (1953, dir. Heinosuke Gosho)
- Onna no Koyomi (1954, dir. Seiji Hisamatsu)
- The Shiinomi School (1955, dir. Hiroshi Shimizu)
- A Wife's Heart (1956, dir. Mikio Naruse)
