= The Dancing Girl of Izu (1933 film) =

1933 Japanese film

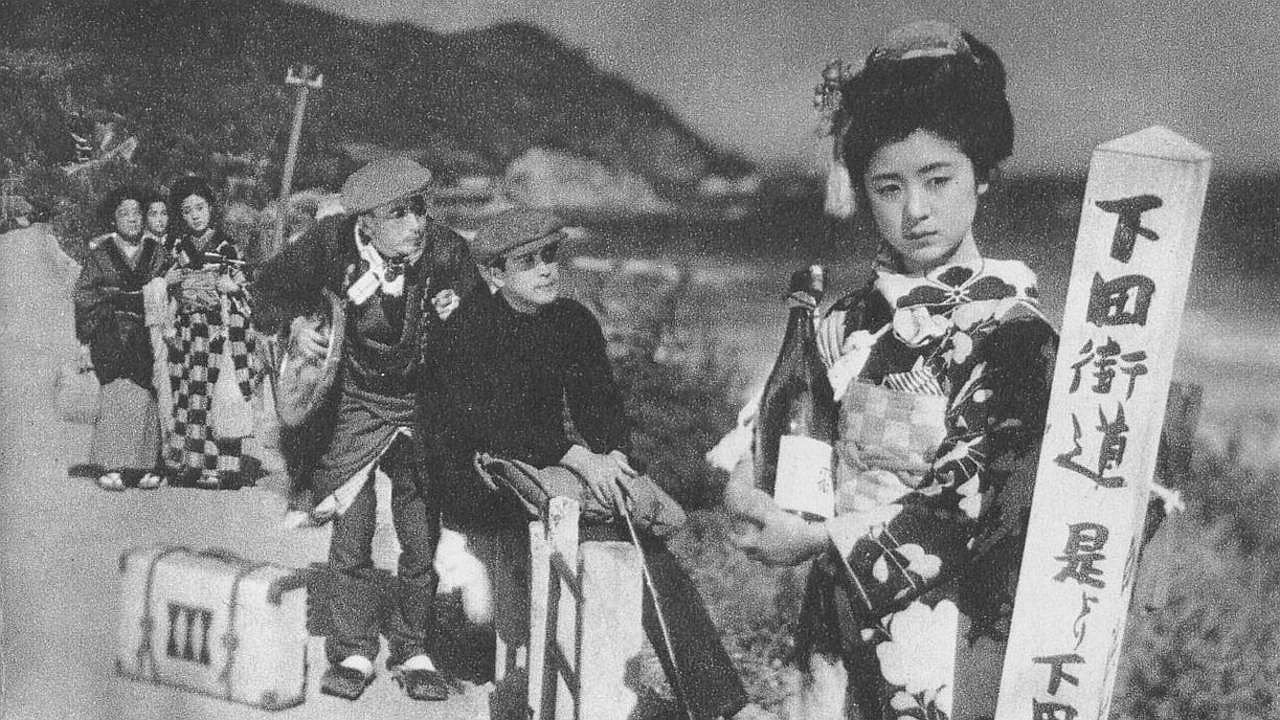

Japanese name
- Kanji: 恋の花咲く 伊豆の踊子
- Directed by: Heinosuke Gosho
- Written by: Akira Fushimi; Yasunari Kawabata (short story)
- Starring: Den Ohinata; Kinuyo Tanaka; Tokuji Kobayashi
- Cinematography: Jōji Ohara
- Production company: Shochiku
- Distributed by: Shochiku
- Release date: 2 February 1933
- Running time: 124 minutes
- Country: Japan
- Language: Japanese (intertitles)

The Dancing Girl of Izu (1933) by Gosho Heinosuke

The Dancing Girl of Izu (Japanese: 恋の花咲く 伊豆の踊子, romanized: Koi no hana saku Izu no odoriko, lit. 'The Blooming Love of a Dancing Girl of Izu') is a 1933 Japanese silent romance film directed by Heinosuke Gosho. It is the first adaptation of the 1926 short story The Dancing Girl of Izu (伊豆の踊子, Izu no odoriko) by Yasunari Kawabata.

== Plot ==
During his vacation tour on the Izu Peninsula, Tokyo student Mizuhara befriends a group of local travelling musicians led by Eikichi. Eikichi lost the family's inheritance, a gold mine, due to his carelessness, which he had to sell for a low price to its new owner Zenbei. While staying in their hometown where they have an engagement, Eikichi's sister Kaoru falls in love with Mizuhara. Instigated by the mine's former engineer Kubota, Eikichi demands what he considers his fair share from Zenbei, but Zenbei replies that he will only give Eikichi money if he sells his sister Kaoru to him. Mizuhara confronts Zenbei, who also happens to be the father of his fellow student Ryūichi, with what he considers an insolent proposal. As it turns out, Zenbei, who was a friend of Eikichi's and Kaoru's father, wants to spare Kaoru the fate of living the life of a travelling musician. Unbeknownst to Kaoru and her brother, Zenbei secretly opened a bank account in her name and hopes to marry her to his son Ryūichi one day. Mizuhara and Kaoru part in tears upon his return to Tokyo, and before entering the boat which will take him home, he advises her to seek happiness in a stable life as Ryūichi's wife.

== Cast ==
- Den Ohinata (credited Den Obinata) as Mizuhara
- Kinuyo Tanaka as Kaoru
- Tokuji Kobayashi as Eikichi
- Eiko Takamatsu as Otatsu, Eikichi's mother
- Kinuko Wakamizu as Chiyoko, Eikichi's wife
- Shizue Hyōdō as Yuriko
- Jun Arai as Zenbei
- Ryōichi Takeuchi as Ryūichi
- Reikichi Kawamura as Kubota
- Ryōtarō Mizushima as Tamura
- Takeshi Sakamoto as Hattori
- Chōko Iida as a geisha
- Kikuko Hanaoka as a geisha
- Shōzaburō Abe as customer
- Kiyoshi Aono as Kisaku

== Legacy ==
The Dancing Girl of Izu is not only the first, but, according to Gosho biographer Arthur Nolletti, also regarded the best of the many adaptations of Kawabata's story, and an important example of films connected to the junbungaku ("pure literature") movement, which favoured "serious" literature in opposition to "popular" literature. Gosho and his screenwriter Fushimi added a subplot and obscured the class differences between the characters, instead aiming at a nostalgic depiction of the country "untainted by modernization" (Mitsuyo Wada-Marciano).
