= Haruo Tanaka =

Japanese actor (1912–1992)

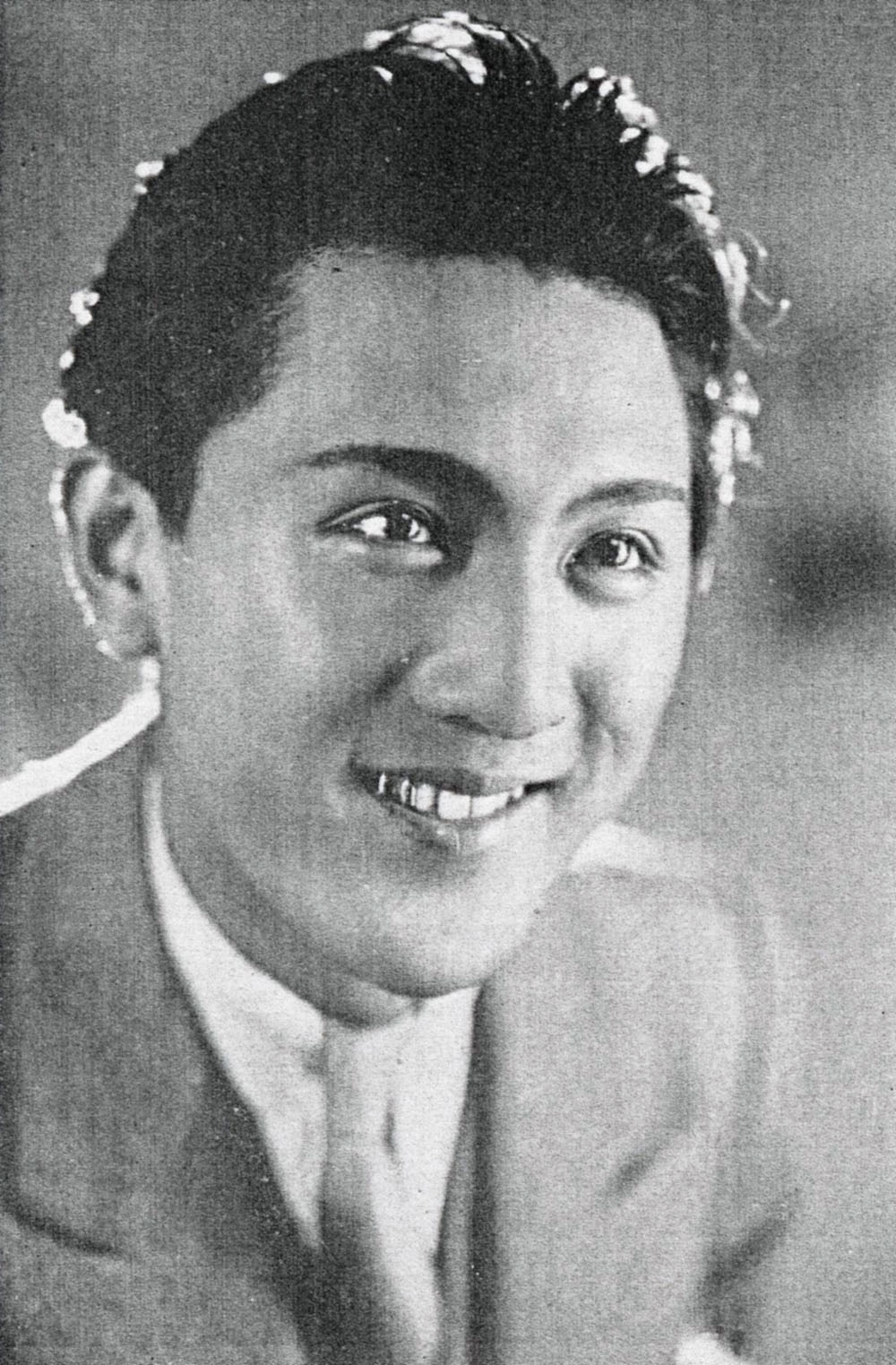
- Haruo Tanaka in 1932
- Born: 25 March 1912; Kyoto, Empire of Japan
- Died: 21 February 1992 (aged 79)
- Occupation: Film actor

Haruo Tanaka (田中 春男, Tanaka Haruo; 25 March 1912 – 21 February 1992) was a Japanese film actor noted for his supporting roles in a career that spanned seven decades.

== Career ==
Tanaka was born in Kyoto and quit school in order to become a film actor, joining the Nikkatsu studio in 1925. He eventually moved up to secondary leads and even into leading roles against actresses such as Ranko Hanai and Haruyo Ichikawa, but he never succeeded as a matinee idol. Following Masaichi Nagata, he moved to Daiichi Eiga and Shinkō Kinema before eventually going freelance. He appeared in over 250 films, both gendaigeki and jidaigeki, by directors such as Yasujirō Ozu, Kenji Mizoguchi, Sadao Yamanaka, Akira Kurosawa, Tomu Uchida, Mikio Naruse, and Masahiro Makino. He was particularly skilled at comic roles. He also appeared in many jidaigeki on television.

== Selected filmography ==
- Kyōren no onna shishō (狂恋の女師匠) (1926)
- The War at Sea from Hawaii to Malaya (ハワイ・マレー沖海戦) (1942)
- Conduct Report on Professor Ishinaka (1952)
- Rikon (離婚) (1952)
- Ikiru (生きる) (1952)
- Where Chimneys Are Seen (煙突の見える場所) (1953)
- Life of a Woman (1953)
- The Crucified Lovers (近松物語 Chikamatsu Monogatari) (1954)
- Yurei Otoko (幽霊男) (1954)
- An Inn at Osaka (大阪の宿) (1954)
- Marital Relations (夫婦善哉 Meoto zenzai) (1955)
- The Legend of the White Serpent (白夫人の妖恋 Byaku fujin no yoren) (1956)
- Yotsuya Kaidan (四谷怪談 Yotsuya Kaidan) (1956)
- Floating Weeds (浮草 Ukikusa) (1959)
- Cruel Female Love Suicide (残酷おんな情死) (1970)
- The Funeral (お葬式) (1984)
