= Yasushi Akutagawa =

Japanese composer and conductor (1925–1989)

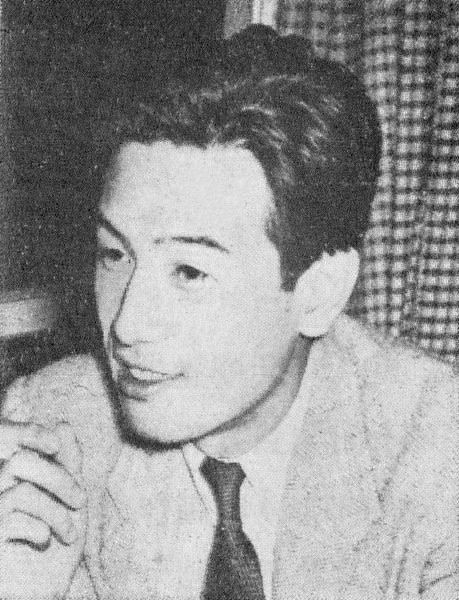
- Akutagawa in 1956
- Born: July 12, 1925; Tokyo, Japan
- Died: January 31, 1989 (aged 63)
- Other name: 芥川 也寸志
- Occupation: Composer
- Spouse: Madokoro Akutagawa Saori (1946-1958)
- Children: 2
- Father: Ryunosuke Akutagawa

Yasushi Akutagawa (芥川 也寸志, Akutagawa Yasushi; July 12, 1925 – January 31, 1989) was a Japanese composer and conductor. His father was Ryūnosuke Akutagawa.

== Biography ==
Akutagawa was born and raised in Tabata, Tokyo, the son of writer Ryūnosuke Akutagawa, who died when he was two years old.

Akutagawa studied composition with Kunihiko Hashimoto, Kan'ichi Shimofusa and Akira Ifukube at the Tokyo Music School. He was one of the members of Sannin no kai (The Three) along with Ikuma Dan and Toshiro Mayuzumi.

In 1954, when Japan did not have diplomatic relations with the Soviet Union yet, Akutagawa entered the Soviet Union illegally, and made friends with Dmitri Shostakovich, Aram Khachaturian and Dmitri Kabalevsky. Akutagawa was the only Japanese composer whose works were officially published in the Soviet Union at that time. His 1950 Music for Symphony Orchestra reflects his love of the music of Shostakovich and Prokofiev.

Akutagawa's compositions were influenced by Stravinsky, Shostakovich, Prokofiev and Akira Ifukube. His film scores include works for directors like Kon Ichikawa, Heinosuke Gosho, Tomu Uchida and Tadashi Imai.

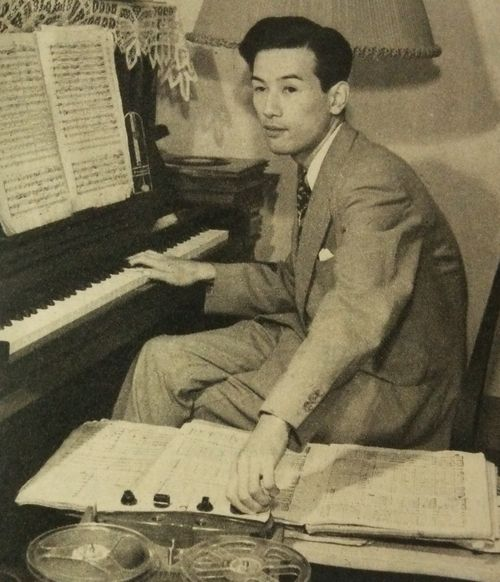
Yasushi Akutagawa in 1952.

He was popular as a master of ceremonies of TV shows. As an educator, he devoted himself to training an amateur orchestra, Shin Kokyo Gakudan ("The New Symphony Orchestra"). Akutagawa and The New Symphony Orchestra received the 1976 Suntory Music Award.

In 1990, the year after Akutagawa died, the Akutagawa Composition Award (now called the Yasushi Akutagawa Suntory Award for Music Composition) was established in his memory.

== Selected list of works ==
=== Opera ===
- Orpheus in Hiroshima (formerly Dark Mirror), text by Kenzaburō Ōe (1960, revised 1967)

=== Orchestral works ===
- Prelude for Symphony Orchestra (1947)
- Trinita Sinfonica (1948)
- Toccata (1949)
- Musica per Orchestra Sinfonica (Music for Symphony Orchestra) (1950)
- Triptyque for string orchestra (1953)
- Prima Sinfonia (Symphony No. 1) (1954, revised 1955)
- Divertimento (1955)
- Symphony for Children "Twin Stars" for children's choir and orchestra, text by Kenji Miyazawa (1957)
- Ellora Symphony (1958)
- Marcia in Do, for wind orchestra (1959)
- Negative Picture for string orchestra (1966)
- Ostinata Sinfonica (1967, revised 1970)
- Concerto Ostinato, for violoncello and orchestra (1969)
- Rapsodia per Orchestra (1971)
- Concerto Ostinato, for GX1 and orchestra (1974)
- Lullaby of Akita for violin and orchestra (1977)
- Poipa no Kawa to Poipa no Ki, for narrator and orchestra, text by Eriko Kishida (1979)
- Allegro Ostinato (1986)
- Sounds for organ and orchestra (1986)
- Ballade on a Theme of Godzilla (1988) - Dedicated to Akira Ifukube
- Inochi, for choir and orchestra (1988)

=== Ballet ===
- Paradise Lost (1950)
- A Dream Under the Lake (1950); lost
- Kappa (1951)
- Flame...star (炎も星も) (1953); lost
- The Spider's Thread (1968)
- The Moon (1981)

=== Ensemble/instrumental works ===
- Piano Trio (1946)
- String Quartet (1948)
- La Danse for piano (1948)
- Shajin-Shu for soprano and piano, text by Haruo Sato (1949)
- Ballade for violin and piano (1951)
- Fantasia for Microphone, tape music (1953)
- Nyambe, for harp, celesta, bass clarinet, 4 violas, 2 cellos, and double bass (1959)
- Music for Strings No. 1, for 4 violins, 2 violas, 2 cellos, and double bass (1962)
- 24 Preludes: The Piano Pieces for Children (1979)

=== Film scores ===
- Nangoku no hada (1952)
- Where Chimneys Are Seen (1953)
- Gate of Hell (1953)
- An Inn at Osaka (1954)
- Takekurabe (1955)
- A Hole of My Own Making (1955)
- Twilight Saloon (1955)
- A Cat, Shozo, and Two Women (1956)
- The Hole (1957)
- Yellow Crow (1957)
- The Rice People (1957)
- Stepbrothers (1957)
- Fires on the Plain (1959)
- Odd Obsession (1959)
- Her Brother (1960)
- Zero Focus (1961)
- Ten Dark Women (1961)
- Being Two Isn't Easy (1962)
- The Outcast (1962)
- Alone Across the Pacific (1963), with Toru Takemitsu
- Portrait of Hell (1969)
- Mt. Hakkoda (1977)
- Village of Eight Gravestones (1977)
- The Demon (1978)
- The Incident (1978)
- Nichiren (1979)
- Suspicion (1982), with Kurōdo Mōri
- Lake Of Illusions (1982)

=== Radio/Television scores ===
- Eriko to Tomoni, radio drama, NHK (1949)
- Akō Rōshi (Forty-seven Ronin), TV drama, NHK (1964)
- Ai no Gakko Cuore Monogatari, TV anime (1981) - Opening and Ending Theme
- Benkei, TV drama, NHK (1986) - Opening Theme

== See also ==
- Madokoro Akutagawa Saori
