= An Inn at Osaka =

1954 Japanese film

- Film poster
- Directed by: Heinosuke Gosho
- Written by: Heinosuke Gosho; Toshio Yasumi; Takitarō Minakami (novel)
- Produced by: Ryosuke Okamoto; Katsuzō Shino
- Starring: Shūji Sano; Toshio Hosokawa; Nobuko Otowa; Mitsuko Mito; Hiroko Kawasaki; Sachiko Hidari
- Cinematography: Jōji Ohara
- Edited by: Shin Nagata
- Music by: Yasushi Akutagawa
- Distributed by: Shintoho
- Release date: 20 April 1954 (Japan)
- Running time: 122 minutes
- Country: Japan
- Language: Japanese

An Inn at Osaka (Japanese: 大阪の宿, Hepburn: Ōsaka no yado) is a 1954 Japanese drama and shōshimin-eiga film directed by Heinosuke Gosho. It is based on the novel of the same name by Takitarō Minakami and was produced by Gosho's own production company Studio Eight. Film historians regard An Inn at Osaka as one of Gosho's major, but also darker works.

== Plot ==
After his reassignment to Osaka due to an argument with his superior, Tokyo businessman Mita is residing in a cheap inn as his salary won't allow for better accommodation. Though rather a reclusive person, he tries to help the housemaidens with their monetary problems (including a solitary mother and the wife of an unemployed worker), while geisha Uwabami tries to awaken his interest, but to no avail. In the end, Mita, who is critical of his new superior's reckless business practices which result in a business partner's suicide, is transferred again. During the goodbye ceremony, Mita reminds the participants, who have all missed their intended goals in one way or another, to "have the dignity to laugh in the face of unhappiness".

== Cast ==
- Shūji Sano as Kyōichi Mita
- Toshio Hosokawa as Tawara
- Nobuko Otowa as Uwabami
- Mitsuko Mito as Orika
- Hiroko Kawasaki as Otsugi
- Sachiko Hidari as Oyone
- Eiko Miyoshi as inn keeper
- Kamatari Fujiwara as Ossan
- Kyōko Anzai as Omitsu
- Haruo Tanaka
- Jun Tatara
- Hisao Toake
- Zekō Nakamura
- Akira Nakamura
- Hyō Kitazawa
- Michiko Megumi
- Toranosuke Ogawa
