= Aiyo =

Aiyo may refer to:

- Aiyo Maru, a Japanese cargo ship sunk during World War II
- Aiyo, Not Bad, an album by Taiwanese singer Jay Chou

== See also ==
- Aiyoku
