= Where Chimneys Are Seen =

1953 Japanese film

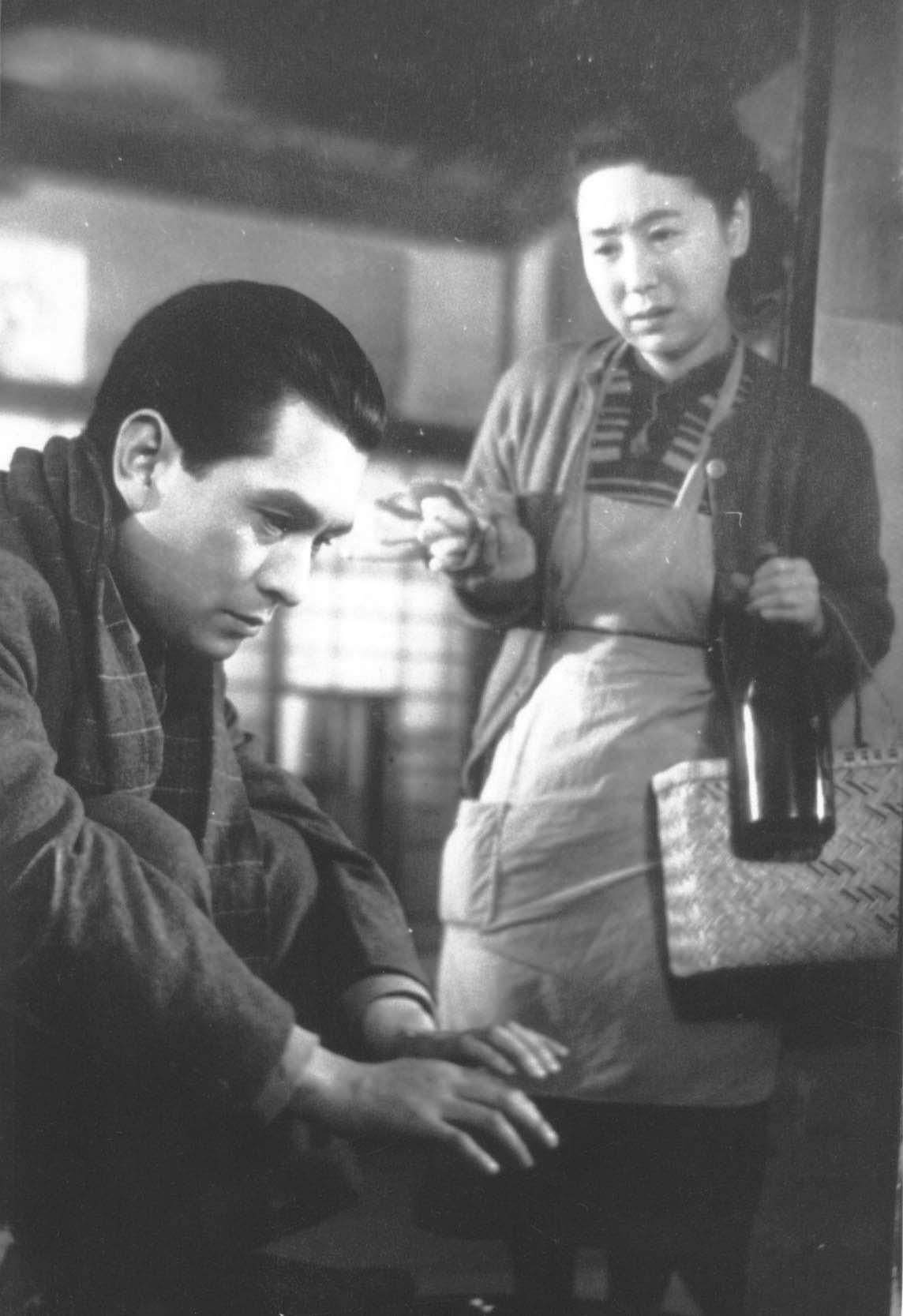
- Directed by: Heinosuke Gosho
- Written by: Hideo Oguni (screenplay); Rinzō Shiina (novel)
- Produced by: Yoshishige Uchiyama
- Starring: Ken Uehara; Kinuyo Tanaka; Hideko Takamine
- Cinematography: Mitsuo Miura
- Edited by: Nobu Nagata
- Music by: Yasushi Akutagawa
- Distributed by: Shintoho
- Release date: 5 March 1953 (Japan)
- Running time: 108 minutes
- Country: Japan
- Language: Japanese

Where Chimneys Are Seen (煙突の見える場所, Entotsu no mieru basho), also titled Four Chimneys, is a 1953 Japanese comedy-drama film directed by Heinosuke Gosho. Based on the novel Mujaki na hitobito by Rinzō Shiina, Where Chimneys Are Seen is regarded as one of Gosho's most important and well-known films and a typical example of the shōshimin-eiga genre.

== Plot ==
Hiroko Ogata and her second husband Ryukichi (her first husband Tsukahara is believed to have died in a bombing in the Second World War) live in the lower-class outskirts of Tokyo. The upper floor of the Ogatas' flat is rented to Kenzō and Senko, a young man and a woman who show interest in each other, but are not a couple. One day, the Ogatas find a baby in the house entrance with a note signed by Tsukahara, stating it was Hiroko's daughter. The marriage is engulfed in a crisis, with Hiroko nearly committing suicide. Kenzō searches the city for Tsukahara and finally finds him and his new wife, the actual mother of the abandoned child, who initially had wanted to abort it. Although the Ogatas have developed an affection for the baby, which fell seriously ill at one point, they agree to return it to Mrs. Tsukahara who, after some hesitation, accepts it as her own.

== Cast ==
- Ken Uehara as Ryukichi Ogata
- Kinuyo Tanaka as Hiroko Ogata
- Hiroshi Akutagawa as Kenzō Kubo
- Hideko Takamine as Senko Azuma
- Chieko Seki as Yukiko Ikeda
- Haruo Tanaka as Chūji Tsukahara
- Ranko Hanai as Katsuko Ishibashi
- Kumeko Urabe as Kayo Nojima
- Takeshi Sakamoto as Tokuji Kawamura
- Eiko Miyoshi as Ranko
- Hikaru Hoshi
- Tadayoshi Nakamura
- Shigeru Ogura
- Eiko Ohara
- Noriko Honma as Ayako Honma

== Production and release ==
Where Chimneys Are Seen was produced by Gosho's own production company Studio Eight (1950–1954) and distributed by Shintoho studios. The film was shown in competition at the 3rd Berlin International Film Festival.

== Reception ==
In his Critical Handbook of Japanese Film Directors, film historian Alexander Jacoby described Where Chimneys Are Seen as "an exemplary depiction of the balance between aspiration and despair in a country recovering from war".

== Awards ==
- Blue Ribbon Award for Best Cinematography (Mitsuo Miura, also for The Wild Geese and Aijō ni tsuite) and Best Music (Yasushi Akutagawa, also for Beyond the Clouds and Yoru no owari)
- Mainichi Film Award for Best Supporting Actor (Hiroshi Akutagawa) and Best Film Score (Yasushi Akutagawa)
