= Eijirō Tōno =

Japanese actor (1907–1994)

- 東野英治郎
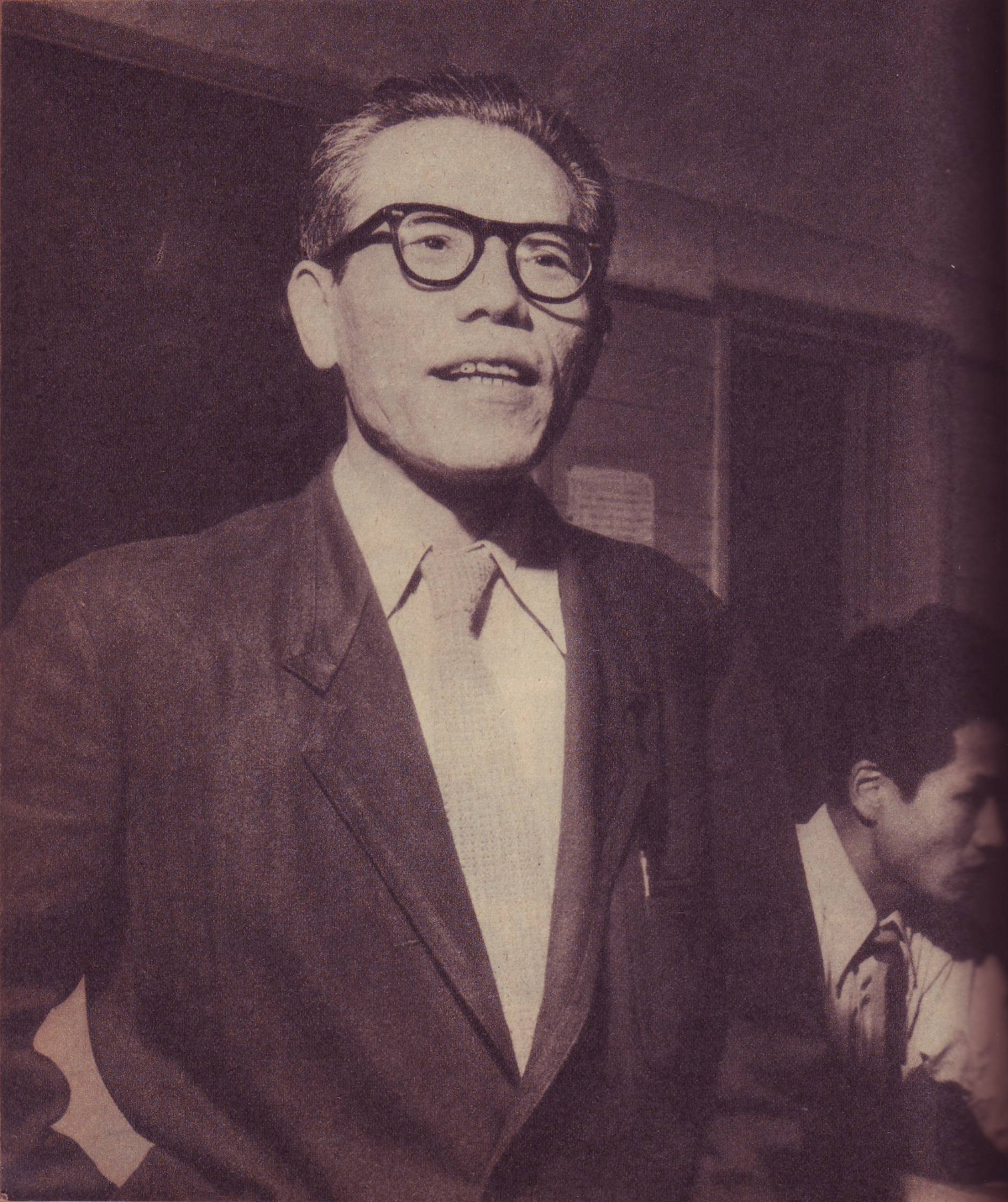
- Tōno in 1954
- Born: 17 September 1907; Tomioka, Gunma, Japan
- Died: 8 September 1994 (aged 86); Setagaya, Tokyo, Japan
- Occupation: Actor
- Years active: 1934–1994
- Children: Eishin Tōno

Eijirō Tōno (東野英治郎, Tōno Eijirō; 17 September 1907 – 8 September 1994) was a Japanese actor who, in a career lasting more than 50 years, appeared in over 400 television shows, nearly 250 films and numerous stage productions. He is best known in the West for his roles in films by Akira Kurosawa, such as Seven Samurai (1954) and Yojimbo (1961), and films by Yasujirō Ozu, such as Tokyo Story (1953) and An Autumn Afternoon (1962). He also appeared in Kill! by Kihachi Okamoto and Tora! Tora! Tora!, a depiction of the Japanese attack on Pearl Harbor. His final film was Juzo Itami's A-ge-man (Tales of a Golden Geisha) in 1990. Tōno also starred as the title character in the long-running television jidaigeki series Mito Kōmon from 1969 to 1983. In the early years of his career he acted under the name of Katsuji Honjo (本庄克二).

== Early life ==
Eijirō Tōno was born on 17 September 1907 in Tomioka City, Gunma Prefecture, Japan. Born to a sake brewery, his father was a Hino merchant (Ōmi merchant), who had moved to Kantō alone from a mountain village in Ōmi Province and worked his way to become a sake brewer from the ground up. Tōno attended Tomioka Middle School. After enrolling as a student in the Commerce Department of Meiji University he joined the left-wing Society for the Study of Social Science (社会科学研究会 : Shakai-kagaku kenkyukai). This was politically dangerous, as the Peace Preservation Law of 1925 made members of any association whose object was the alteration of the kokutai (National Polity), or of the system of private property, liable to imprisonment for up to ten years. In 1931 he became a student on the proletarian drama course run by the Tsukiji Little Theatre (築地小劇場: Tsukiji shogekijo). He made his stage debut in the Tokyo Left-wing Theatre (東京左翼劇場: Tokyo sayoku gekijo) production of The Mount Osore Tunnel (恐山トンネル: Osoreyama tonneru) by Jūrō Miyoshi. Having completed the proletarian drama course, he joined the New Tsukiji Theatre Group and took the stage name Katsuji Honjō (本庄克二).

== Career ==
Through the 1930s, Tōno appeared in almost all of the New Tsukiji Theatre Group's productions, receiving favourable reviews. In particular, his performances as Heizō in Earth (土: Tsuchi), Yugorō in The Composition-writing Classroom (綴方教室: Tsuzurikata kyōshitsu) and the Gravedigger in Hamlet established his reputation as an actor. He also came to play an important part in the management of the troupe. In 1936, he made his film debut in Older Brother, Younger Sister (兄いもうと: Ani imōto). In 1938 he appeared in Teinosuke Kinugasa's Kuroda seichū roku (黒田誠忠録)and subsequently had roles in pictures for the Shōchiku, Nikkatsu and Tōhō studios. Up to this point, he was credited under his stage name, 'Katsuji Honjō'.

In August 1940 the New Tsukiji Theatre Group was forcibly disbanded. From this time on, he was credited as 'Tōno Eijirō'. In 1943 he appeared in Keisuke Kinoshita's debut film Port of Flowers (花咲く港: Hana saku minato). In 1944 Tōno, Eitarō Ozawa, Koreya Senda, Sugisaku Aoyama, Chieko Higashiyama and others formed the Actors' Theatre Haiyuza. During the last year of the Pacific War, he toured Japan under the auspices of the Japan Peripatetic Drama League (日本移動演劇連盟), an officially sponsored body whose remit was to raise morale, and therefore productivity, by bringing drama to factories, mines, farming communities and fishing villages.

After the war ended in August 1945, Tōno returned to the Actors' Theatre as one of its central figures, both actor and administrator. Between the end of the war and 1990 he also played supporting roles in well over 200 films. Notable among them were seven films for Akira Kurosawa, including Seven Samurai and Yojimbo, four for Yasujirō Ozu, including Tokyo Story and An Autumn Afternoon, and nine for Keisuke Kinoshita, including Marriage (結婚: Kekkon) and The Ballad of Narayama.

He also voiced Doc in the 1958 Japanese dub of Snow White and the Seven Dwarfs (1937 film).

The role for which he is perhaps best remembered in Japan, however, is that of the title character in the hugely popular TV jidaigeki Mito Kōmon, in which the historical Tokugawa Mitsukuni, retired daimyō of the Mito Domain, roams the country in the guise of a retired merchant, Mitsuemon, righting wrongs and correcting injustice with the aid of two samurai retainers. Tōno played the role in 381 episodes between 1969 and 1983. (The series continued through 2011, with four further actors playing Mitsuemon.)

Tōno died of heart failure on 8 September 1994, nine days before his 87th birthday.

== Selected filmography ==
- Older Brother, Younger Sister (1936) as A laborer (uncredited)
- Port of Flowers (1943) as Hayashida
- Kaigun (1943)
- Kanko no machi (1944)
- Army (1944) as Sakuragi
- Izu no musumetachi (1945) as Murakami
- Morning for the Osone Family (1946) as Ippei Yamaki
- Kekkon (1947) as Kōhei, Fumie's father
- Tsukinode no ketto (1947)
- Joyū Sumako no koi (1947) as Shoyo Tsubouchi
- Natsukashi no buruusu (1948)
- Jutai (1948)
- Taifuken no onna (1948) as Yoshii
- The Broken Commandment (1948)
- Waga Koi wa Moenu (1949) as State Councillor Ito
- Shin'ya no kokuhaku (1949)
- Mahiru no embukyoku (1949) as Sampei Kuribayashi
- Stray Dog (1949) as Old man of wooden tub shop
- Rinchi (1949)
- Ma no ogon (1950)
- Akagi Kara kita otoko (1950)
- Les Miserables (1950)
- Sasaki Kojiro (1950)
- Zoku Sasaki Kojiro (1951)
- Ginza Cosmetics (1951) as Hyôbei Sugano
- Jiyû gakkô (1951)
- Hopu-san: sararîman no maki (1951)
- Kanketsu Sasaki Kojirô: Ganryû-jima kettô (1951) as Jinnai Ôba
- Sekishun (1952) as Sakichi Arakawa
- Yamabiko gakkô (1952)
- Sengoku burai (1952)
- Children of Hiroshima (1952)
- Bijo to touzoku (1952) as Jurota
- Muntinlupa no yo wa fukete (1952)
- Himitsu (1952) as Jonosuke Tajima
- Fuun senryobune (1952)
- Jûdai no seiten (1953) as Tomekichi, Fusae's father
- Asama no karasu (1953) as Hyakusuke no Onoji
- Hiroba no kodoku (1953) as Soneda
- Hana no naka no musumetachi (1953) as Shôroku Ishii
- The Wild Geese (1953) as Suezô, the moneylender
- Waseda daigaku (1953) as Nomura
- Shishun no izumi (1953) as Nakamura, a policeman
- Tokyo Story (1953) as Sanpei Numata
- Life of a Woman (1953) as Kyuzaemon
- Seven Samurai (1954) as Thief
- The Sound of Waves (1954) as Schoolmaster, a peddler
- Taiyo no nai machi (1954)
- Midori no nakama (1954) as Tamon Tsuburagi
- Nyonin no yakata (1954) as Inokawa
- Horafuki tanji (1954) as Policeman Iketani
- Kuroi ushio (1954)
- Kunsho (1954)
- Keisatsu nikki (1955)
- Koko ni izumi ari (1955)
- Ai no onimotsu (1955)
- Uruwashiki saigetsu (1955) as Imanishi's father
- Tasogare sakaba (1955) as Onizuka
- Wolf (1955)
- Samurai II: Duel at Ichijoji Temple (1955) as Baiken Shishido
- Ukikusa nikki (1955)
- Record of a Living Being (1955) as Old man from Brazil
- Shuzenji Monagatari (1955) as Hōjō Tokimasa
- Samurai III: Duel at Ganryu Island (1956) as Baiken Shishido
- Hanayome no tameiki (1956) as Tahei Kawamura
- Early Spring (1956) as Tokichi Hattori
- Hakusen midare kurokami (1956)
- Kyûketsu-ga (1956) as Tetsuzô Ibuki / Shunsaku Etô
- Farewell to Dream (1956) as Yôichi's father, Genkichi
- Hana no kyodai (1956)
- Byaku fujin no yoren (1956)
- Zenigata Heiji Torimono no Hikae: Hitohada Gumo (1956)
- Nonki fufu (1956)
- Mori wa ikiteiru (1956) as A waiting man
- Hadashi no seishun (1956) as Shiimbei Hayashi
- Anata kaimasu (1956) as Ogushi
- An Actress (1956) as Tadao Inoue
- Tsuyu no atosaki (1956)
- Night River (1956)
- Namida (1956)
- Kome (1957) as Sakuzo
- Ôban (1957) as Chaplin-San
- An Osaka Story (1957) as Ninpei Omiya
- Suzakumon (1957) as Tomofusa Kunokura, Yuhide's father
- Ninjitsu (1957) as Fugetsusai
- Untamed (1957)
- Snow Country (1957) as Keisuke Kiyama
- Hikage no musume (1957)
- Zoku Ôban: Fûun hen (1957) as Chaplin san
- The Lower Depths (1957) as Tomekichi the Tinker
- Jun'ai monogatari (1957) as Garbage man
- Kuroi kawa (1957) as Kurihara
- Dotanba (1957)
- Ninkyo shimisu-minato (1957) as Kansuke
- Boryoku no hatoba (1957)
- Yagyû bugeichô: Sôryû hiken (1958) as Fugetsusai
- Hotarubi (1958)
- Ankoru watto monogatari utsukushiki aishu (1958) as Chamberlain
- Yoru no tsuzumi (1958) as Mataemon Kurokawa
- The Ballad of Narayama (1958) as Messenger
- Kisetsufu no kanatani (1958)
- Oban kanketsu hen (1958)
- Wakai kemono (1958)
- Hitotsubu no mugi (1958)
- Zokuzoku sarariman shussetai kôki (1958)
- Kami no taisho (1958)
- Hadaka no taishô (1958) as Commander
- Jinsei gekijô - Seishun hen (1958)
- Shirasagi (1958)
- Akujo no kisetsu (1958) as Taisuke Yashiro
- Wakai kawa no nagare (1959) as Shôkichi Sone
- The Human Condition (1959)
- Dai san no shikaku (1959) as Kazuta Kubo
- Kiku to Isamu (1959) as Policeman
- Karatachi nikki (1959)
- Ohayo (aka Good Morning) (1959) as Tomizawa
- High Teen (1959) as Tateishi, principal
- Yajû shisubeshi (1959) as Detective Kawashima
- Naniwa no koi no monogatari (1959)
- Mi wa jukushitari (1959) as Saemon, Hikari's father
- Ningen no kabe (1959)
- The Three Treasures (1959) as Ootomo
- Futô no nâwabarî (1959)
- Shin santô jûyaku: Tabi to onna to sake no maki (1960)
- Ôinaru tabiji (1960)
- Chinpindô shujin (1960)
- Kunisada Chûji (1960) as Kansuke
- Ajisai no uta (1960) as Genjûrô Kurata
- Sake to onna to yari (1960) as Hideyoshi Toyotomi
- Shin santo juyaku: teishu kyo iku no maki (1960)
- Kenka Tarô (1960) as Kitaura
- The Twilight Story (1960) as Teacher Yamai
- Ashita hareru ka (1960) as Seisaku Kajiwara
- Sararîman Chûshingura (1960) as Gonosuke Kira
- Ore no kokyô wa western (1960) as Ôkawa
- Tekkaba no kazê (1960)
- Botchan yaro seizoroi (1961)
- Pigs and Battleships (1961) as Kan'ichi
- Zoku sararîman Chûshingura (1961) as Gonosuke Kira
- Eddoko bugyo tenka o kiru otoko (1961)
- Yojimbo (1961) as Gonji - Tavern Keeper
- Tôshi reijô (1961) as Ginroku
- Ai to honoho to (1961) as Kudo
- The Littlest Warrior (1961) as Sanshô Dayû (voice)
- Kako (1961)
- Akai kôya (1961) as Shinzô Okui
- Immortal Love (1961) as Policeman
- Sekai daisensô (1961)
- Dôdôtaru jinsei (1961) as Daisaku Hara
- Buda (1961) as Suratha
- Hadakakko (1961) as Shohei, Akiko's father
- Kanpai! Gokigen yarou (1961)
- Taiheî hara no otoko (1961)
- Salary man Shimizu minato (1962) as Komazô Kuroda
- Zoku sararîman shimizu minato (1962)
- Watakushi-tachi no kekkon (1962)
- Musume to watashi (1962) as Grandfather
- Seinen no isu (1962) as Genjûrô Hatada
- Kyûpora no aru machi (1962) as Tatsugorô Ishiguro (Jun's father)
- Shachô yôkôki (1962)
- Nakayama shichiri (1962)
- Chiisakobe (1962) as Ikichi
- Akitsu Springs (1962) as Priest
- Ao beka monogatari (1962) as Grandpa Yoshi
- Shin no shikôtei (1962) as Li Tang
- An Autumn Afternoon (1962) as Seitarō Sakuma, "The Gourd"
- Kawa no hotori de (1962) as Tôgo Sawada
- Akai kage-bôshi (1962) as Jinzaburô Kamo
- Sen-hime to Hideyori (1962) as Tokugawa Ieyasu
- Hakone-yama (1962)
- Twin Sisters of Kyoto (1963) as Sosuke Otomo
- High and Low (1963) as factory worker
- Shiro to kuro (1963)
- Shitamachi no taiyô (1963) as Gensuke
- Kono kubi ichimangoku (1963) as Tenzen Ôshikôchi
- Bushido, Samurai Saga (1963) as Shibiku-Shosuke Hori
- Jinsei gekijo: zoku hisha kaku (1963)
- Kekkonshiki Kekkonshiki (1963) as Gorô
- Otoko no monshô (1963)
- Zoku shinobi no mono (1963) as Toyotomi Hideyoshi
- Kaigun (1963)
- Eden no umi (1963)
- Kureji sakusen: Kudabare! Musekinin (1963)
- Gobanchô yûgirirô (1963) as Kunigi
- The Elegant Life of Mr. Everyman (1963) as Meiji, his father
- Tange Sazen: zankoku no kawa (1963)
- Shin shinobi no mono (1963)
- Ukyonosuke Junsatsu-ki (1963)
- Hachigatsu umare no Onna (1963)
- Miyamoto Musashi: Ichijôji no kettô (1964) as Haiya
- Pale Flower (1964) as Gang Leader
- Hanayome wa jûgo sai (1964)
- Kizudarake no sanga (1964) as Shinzo Kozuki
- Echigo Tsutsuishi Oyashirazu (1964) as Endô
- Hadaka no jûyaku (1964) as Kosugi, president
- Horafuki taikôki (1964) as Koroku Hachisuka
- Otoko no monshô - fuun futatsu ryu (1964)
- Kûroi daîsu ga ore o yobû (1964)
- Dokonjô monogatari: Zuputo iyatsu (1964)
- Baka ga tanku de yatte kuru (1964)
- Aa, seishun no mune no chi wa (1964) as Sôtarô Shimizu
- Shachô ninpôchô (1965)
- Samurai Assassin (1965) as Masagorô Kisoya
- Red Beard (1965) as Goheiji
- Nippon ichi no goma suri otoko (1965)
- Muhômatsu no isshô (1965) as Jûzô Yûki
- Illusion of Blood (1965) as Priest
- Sword of the Beast (1965) as Minister
- Abashiri bangaichi: Bôkyô hen (1965)
- Akutô (1965) as Commentator
- Uzushio (1965)
- Supai (1965)
- An Innocent Witch (1965) as Mountain shaman
- Iki-ni kanzu (1965)
- Shachô gyôjôki (1966)
- Tobenai chinmoku (1966)
- Yojôhan monogatari: Shôfu Shino (1966) as Uyû
- Izuko e (1966)
- Yoidore hakase (1966) as Marshal
- Lost Sex (1966) as Neighbor / Writer
- The Great White Tower (1966) as Professor Azuma (the first surgery dept)
- Yorû no bara o kesê (1966)
- Zatôichi tekka tabi (1967) as Senzo
- Kitaguni no ryojô (1967) as Kichinosuke Kawara
- Lost Spring (1967) as Soga
- Kureji no Kaitô Jibako (1967)
- Zoku ô-oku maruhi monogatari (1967) as Narrator (voice)
- Moero! Taiyô (1967)
- Waka oyabun senryû-hada (1967)
- Nippon ichi no otoko no naka no otoko (1967) as Gonosuke Okanda
- Kamo to negi (1968) as Shigejiro Ohno
- Teppô denraiki (1968) as Kinbei Yaita
- Kill! (1968) as Hyogo Moriuchi
- The Great Adventure of Horus, Prince of the Sun (1968) as Ganko, the blacksmith (voice)
- Âh himeyuri no tô (1968) as Nakaji, Principal
- Moero! Seishun (1968) as Zenkichi Misawa
- Otoko no chosen (1968)
- Fukushû no uta ga kikoeru (1968)
- Kureji no buchamukure daihakken (1969) as Onikuma
- Shachô enmachô (1969)
- Tirania (1969)
- Zoku shachô enmachô (1969)
- Zoku otoko wa tsurai yo (1969) as Sanpo Sensei
- Shachô gaku ABC (1970)
- Zoku shachô gaku ABC (1970)
- Fuji sanchō (1970)
- Tora! Tora! Tora! (1970) as Vice Admiral Chuichi Nagumo
- Tenkan no abarembo (1970)
- Shokon ichidai tenka no abarenbo (1970)
- Showa hito keta shachô tai futaketa shain (1971)
- Gekido no showashi: Okinawa kessen (1971)
- Zoku Showa hito keta shachō tai futaketa shain: Getsu-getsu kasui moku kinkin (1971)
- Gokumon-to (1977) as Kaemon Kitō - Yosamatsu's Father
- Mito Komon (1978) as Tokugawa Mitsukuni
- Hunter in the Dark (1979) as Shogen
- Eireitachi no oenka: saigo no sōkeisen (1979)
- Izakaya Chōji (1983) as Matukawa
- So What (1988)
- Death of a Tea Master (1989) as Kokei
- Harasu no ita hibi (1989)
- Ageman (1990) as Prime Minister

== Honours ==
- Medal with Purple Ribbon (1975)
- Order of the Rising Sun, 4th Class, Gold Rays with Rosette (1982)
