= An Innocent Witch =

1965 Japanese film

- Film poster

Japanese name
- Kanji: 恐山の女
- Directed by: Heinosuke Gosho
- Written by: Hideo Horie; Hajime Ogawa (novel)
- Produced by: Kiyoshi Shimazu
- Starring: Jitsuko Yoshimura; Keizō Kawasaki; Taiji Tonoyama; Minori Terada; Eijirō Tōno
- Cinematography: Sōzaburō Shinomura
- Edited by: Sadako Ikeda
- Music by: Sei Ikeno
- Distributed by: Shochiku
- Release date: 30 October 1965 (Japan)
- Running time: 98 minutes
- Country: Japan
- Language: Japanese

An Innocent Witch (Japanese: 恐山の女, Hepburn: Osorezan no onna; lit. Woman of Mount Osore) is a 1965 Japanese drama film directed by Heinosuke Gosho. It is based on the novel Reiba no onna by Hajime Ogawa. Called "uncharaceristically harsh" for the director by Gosho biographer Arthur Nolletti, the film, produced by Gosho's own production company, was not a commercial success, but is critically acclaimed by film historians.

== Plot ==
During the annual religious festivities at Mount Osore, widow Kikuno joins a medium to contact the spirit of her deceased daughter Ayako and ask her for forgiveness. The film switches back to 20 years earlier when in 1937, Ayako, a poor fisherman's daughter from Ōma, is sold to a brothel as her ill father can't support the family anymore. She is violently deflowered by rich merchant Yamasan, who becomes her regular customer. One year later, she meets Kanjiro, a young student, who becomes another regular customer and to whom she develops an emotional bond. It turns out that Kanjiro is Yamasan's son, but while Yamasan has no problem sharing her with his son, Kanjiro is reluctant to her meeting his father. After Yamasan dies of a heart attack during a visit to Ayako and Kanjiro commits suicide in the military service, Ayako is stigmatised as bringing bad luck. Kanichi, a new customer, reveals himself as Kanjiro's older brother, who insists that the rumours surrounding Ayako are pure superstition. Ayako and Kanichi become lovers, but before his plan to go to Tokyo together is realised, he is killed by an army truck driver who refuses to stop for him. When the brothel's owners demand her leaving the house because she might be possessed by an evil spirit, Ayako, out of desperation, agrees to have an exorcism performed on her. Severely beaten during the brutal exorcism ritual, Ayako finally dies.

== Cast ==
- Jitsuko Yoshimura as Ayako
- Keizō Kawasaki as Kanichi
- Taiji Tonoyama as Yamasan
- Minori Terada as Kanjiro
- Eijirō Tōno as shaman
- Kin Sugai as Kikuno, Ayako's mother
- Chieko Nakakita as brothel owner
- Misako Tominaga
- Kumeko Urabe

== Reception and legacy ==
An Innocent Witch ranked #7 on Kinema Junpo's annual list of the ten best Japanese films in 1965. It was part of the 1989–1990 retrospective on Heinosuke Gosho held by the Japan Society and the Museum of Modern Art, New York.
