= Non-chan Kumo ni Noru =

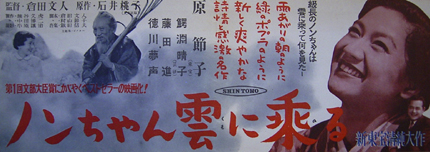
- Japanese movie poster
- Directed by: Fumito Kurata
- Written by: Momoko Ishii (novel)
- Produced by: Shintoho
- Cinematography: Joji Ohara
- Distributed by: Shintoho
- Release date: June 7, 1955
- Running time: 84 minutes
- Country: Japan
- Language: Japanese

Non-chan Kumo ni Noru (ノンちゃん雲に乗る; literally: Nobuko Rides on a Cloud), is a 1955 Japanese film directed by Fumito Kurata. It was based on a best-seller by Momoko Ishii.

== Cast ==
Actor	Role
Setsuko Hara	Nobuko's mother
Haruko Wanibuchi	Nobuko Tashiro
Susumu Fujita	Nobuko's father
Musei Tokugawa	old man
Akira Nagoya	Driver
Akira Ōizumi	
Michiko Ozawa	
