= Burden of Life =

1935 Japanese film

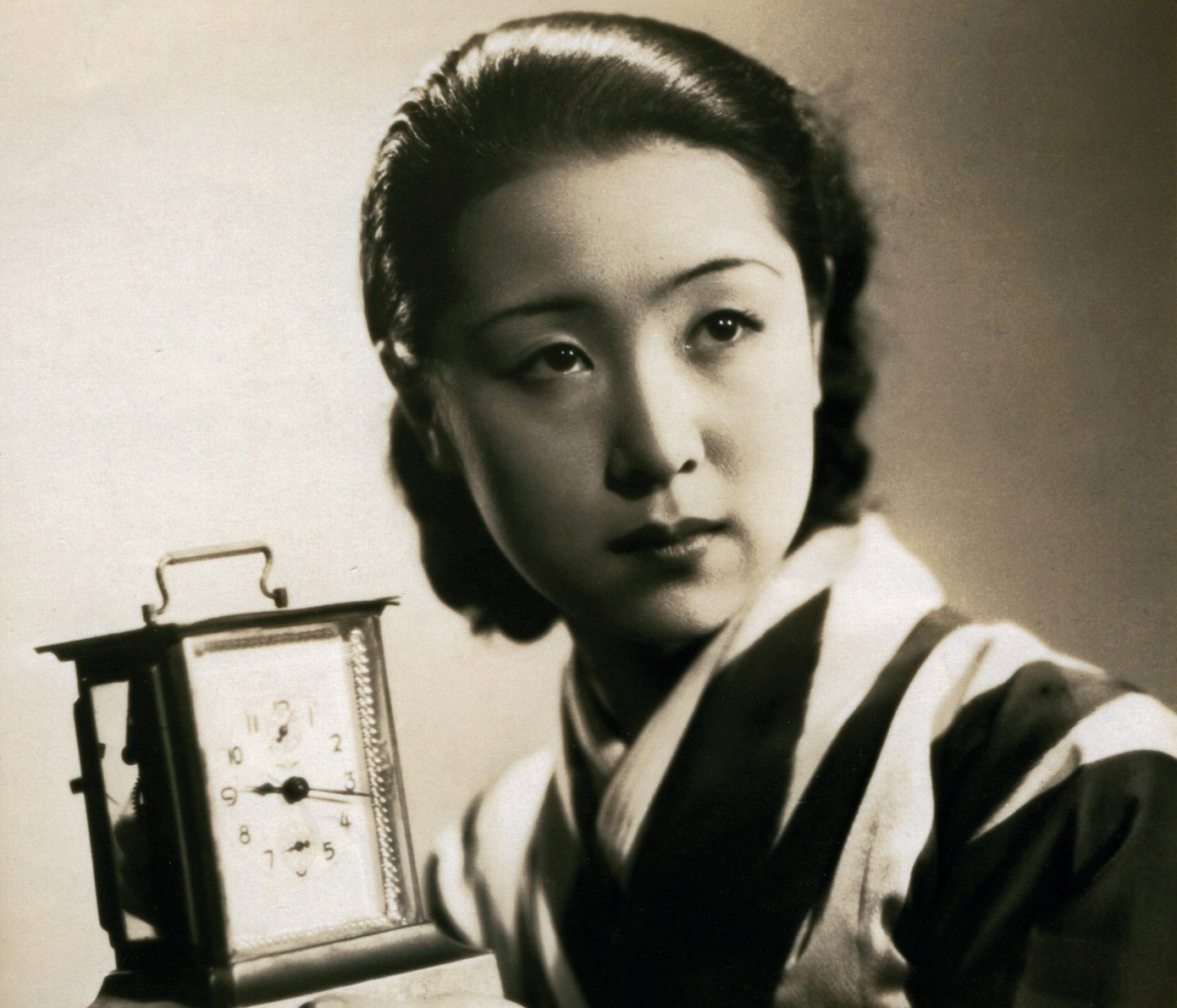
- Kinuyo Tanaka in Burden of Life

Japanese name
- Kanji: 人生のお荷物
- Directed by: Heinosuke Gosho
- Written by: Akira Fushimi
- Starring: Tatsuo Saito; Mitsuko Yoshikawa; Yoshiko Tsubouchi; Kinuyo Tanaka; Shin Saburi; Masao Hayama
- Cinematography: Jōji Ohara
- Edited by: Makoto Shibuya
- Music by: Keizo Horiuchi
- Production company: Shochiku
- Release date: 10 December 1935 (Japan)
- Running time: 66 mins.
- Country: Japan
- Language: Japanese

Burden of Life (1935) by Heinosuke Gosho

Burden of Life (人生のお荷物, Jinsei no onimotsu) is a 1935 Japanese comedy-drama and shōshimin-eiga film directed by Heinosuke Gosho.

== Plot ==
Elderly couple Shōzō and Tamoko have just successfully married away the third and youngest of their daughters, but get into an argument over their son Kanichi, who is still in elementary school. Shōzō argues that he and Tamoko had Kanichi far too late, and instead of paying for his education another twenty years, he should be taken out of school and sent to work. Tamoko protests his proposition, which infuriates Shōzō so much that he demands that she leaves the house.

Tamoko and Kanichi move into the apartment of daughter Itsuko and her husband. Shōzō has increasing doubts about his attitude towards Kanichi, and when his son shows up at his former home, he indulges him and feeds him his favourite food. Tamoko, asked to show more understanding for her husband's perspective by her acquaintances and Itsuko, follows their advice and returns to Shōzō.

== Cast ==
- Tatsuo Saitō as Shōzō Fukushima
- Mitsuko Yoshikawa as Tamoko Fukushima
- Yoshiko Tsubouchi as Takako, the eldest daughter
- Kinuyo Tanaka as Itsuko, the second daughter
- Shin Saburi as Kōsei Hashimoto
- Masao Hayama as Kanichi, the son
- Mitsuyo Mizushima as Machiko, the youngest daughter
- Kenji О̄yama as Tetsuo Komiyama
- Tokuji Kobayashi as Shunkichi Kuriyama

== Release ==
Burden of Life was released in Japan on 10 December 1935 and reached #6 in Kinema Junpo's list of the best films of the year. In 1985, it was screened at the Berkeley Art Museum and Pacific Film Archive.

== Legacy ==
For John Gillett of the British Film Institute, Burden of Life is "imbued with a naturalistic tone and ‘lived in' visual texture quite beyond American and European cinema of the time". David Owens of the Japan Film Center emphasises the film's character development: "Each of the family members is carefully drawn and each grows before us as an individual, surpassing the sort of character typing that was usual for family melodramas."
