= Aiyoku =

Aiyoku may refer to:

- Aiyoku no Eustia, a visual novel
- Aiyoku no ki, a 1930 Japanese film

== See also ==
- Aiyo
