= Takekurabe (1955 film) =

1955 Japanese film

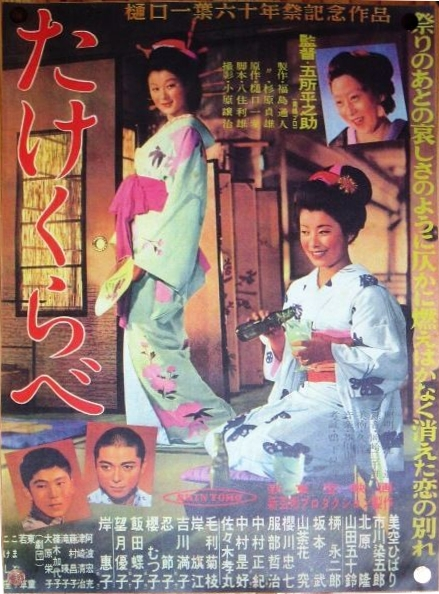
- Japanese movie poster
- Directed by: Heinosuke Gosho
- Written by: Toshio Yasumi (screenplay); Higuchi Ichiyō (novella)
- Produced by: Tsūjin Fukushima; Sadao Sugihara; Ippei Hata
- Starring: Hibari Misora; Takashi Kitahara; Keiko Kishi
- Cinematography: Joji Ohara
- Music by: Yasushi Akutagawa
- Distributed by: Shintoho
- Release date: 28 August 1955 (Japan)
- Running time: 95 minutes
- Country: Japan
- Language: Japanese

Takekurabe (たけくらべ, Takekurabe; lit. "Comparing heights"), English titles Growing Up, Adolescence, or Daughters of Yoshiwara, is a 1955 Japanese drama film directed by Heinosuke Gosho. It is based on Higuchi Ichiyō's 1895-1896 novella Takekurabe.

== Plot ==
Growing up in the Yoshiwara red light district of Meiji era Edo, teenage boy Shinnyo, son of a buddhist priest, helplessly witnesses not only his sister Ohana being sold as a concubine by his money-loving father, but also the fate of Midori, a neighbourhood girl to whom he has an unspoken affection, who is destined to become a courtesan like her older sister Omaki.

== Cast ==
- Hibari Misora as Midori
- Keiko Kishi as Omaki
- Mitsuko Yoshikawa as Orin, Midori's mother
- Zeko Nakamura as Gosuke, Midori's father
- Eijirō Yanagi as owner of the Daikokuya
- Takashi Kitahara as Shinnyo
- Setsuko Shinobu as Shinnyo's mother
- Takamaru Sasaki as Shinnyo's father
- Kurayoshi Nakamura as Sangoro
- Yūko Mochizuki as Sangoro's mother
- Takeshi Sakamoto as Sangoro's father
- Akira Hattori as Chokichi
- Kyū Sazanka as Tatsugoro, Chokichi's father
- Matsumoto Hakuō II (credited Somegorō Ichikawa) as Shōtarō
- Kikue Mōri as Shōtarō's grandmother
- Atsuko Ichinomiya as messenger
- Iida Chōko as Baayaotoki
- Isuzu Yamada as Okichi
- Hatae Kishi
- Kyū Sakamoto (uncredited)

== Production and reception ==
Takekurabe was independently produced by Tsūjin Fukushima's company New Art Productions (新芸術プロダクション, Shin Geijutsu Purodakushon), which resulted in budgetary constraints and compromises in the filming. It received mixed reviews during its initial run for being "overliterary" and the casting of pop star Hibari Misora. Film scholar Donald Richie and Gosho biographer Arthur Nolletti later called Takekurabe an "outstanding example" (Nolletti) of the Meiji-mono (Meiji period film) and "one of the finest due to its excellent sets" (by Kazuo Kubo), "its superb photography and the nearly perfect performances" (Richie).

== Awards ==
- Blue Ribbon Award for Best Supporting Actress Isuzu Yamada in Takekurabe and Ishigassen
