= Ginza Cosmetics =

1951 Japanese film

- DVD cover
- Directed by: Mikio Naruse
- Written by: Matsuo Kishi; Tomoichirō Inoue (novel)
- Produced by: Motohiko Ito
- Starring: Kinuyo Tanaka
- Cinematography: Akira Mimura
- Edited by: Hidetoshi Kasama
- Music by: Seiichi Suzuki
- Distributed by: Shintoho
- Release date: 14 April 1951 (Japan)
- Running time: 87 minutes
- Country: Japan
- Language: Japanese

Ginza Cosmetics (銀座化粧, Ginza keshō) is a 1951 Japanese drama film directed by Mikio Naruse. It is based on a novel by Tomoichirō Inoue.

== Plot ==
Ginza Cosmetics follows the life of hostess Yukiko, single mother of a young boy, in the lively Tokyo quarter of Ginza.

== Cast ==
- Kinuyo Tanaka as Yukiko Tsuji
- Ranko Hanai as Shizue Sayama
- Kyōko Kagawa as Kyōko
- Eijirō Yanagi as Seikichi Kineya
- Eijirō Tōno as Hyōbei Sugano
- Yoshihiro Nishikubo as Haruo
