= The Neighbor's Wife and Mine =

1931 Japanese film

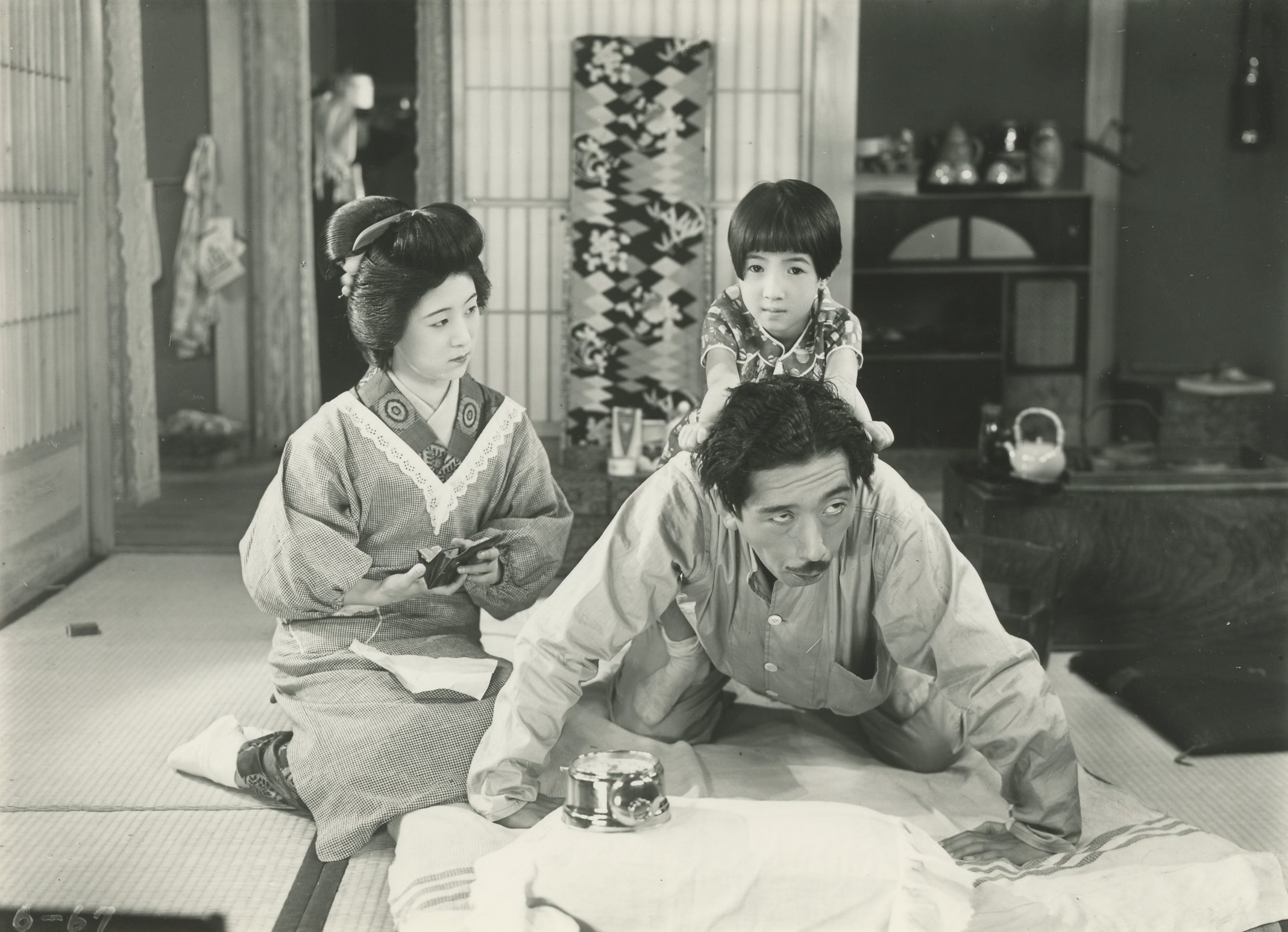
- マダムと女房
- Directed by: Heinosuke Gosho
- Written by: Akira Fushimi; Komatsu Kitamura
- Produced by: Shirō Kido
- Starring: Atsushi Watanabe; Kinuyo Tanaka; Satoko Date; Mitsuko Ichimura
- Cinematography: Monjiro Mizutani
- Music by: Tetsuo Takashina; Haruyoshi Shimada
- Production company: Shochiku
- Distributed by: Shochiku
- Release date: 1 August 1931 (Japan)
- Running time: 56 minutes
- Country: Japan
- Language: Japanese

The Neighbor's Wife and Mine (1931) by Heinosuke Gosho

The Neighbor's Wife and Mine (Japanese: マダムと女房, Hepburn: Madamu to nyōbō) is a 1931 Japanese comedy film directed by Heinosuke Gosho. It was Japan's first feature length film to fully employ sound, as well the earliest surviving Japanese sound film.

== Plot ==
The comedic story depicts a playwright attempting to write a play by a strict deadline and getting distracted by his family and a noisy next-door jazz band.

The film opens with Shibano, a playwright for a Tokyo theater, squabbling with a painter over his work depicting a local house, newly up for rent. The two stumble into the street only to be interrupted when Shibano accidentally falls into the women's section of a nearby bathhouse. The woman who appears to scold them ends up dissolving the situation, and Shibano finally states his desire to move into the house pictured previously.

Soon, Shibano and his family have moved in, but he is late on his deadline for a new script and the family is running low on money. His first attempts do not go well, with distractions from his children and his wife, as well as his own procrastination. The neighbors are also distracting, as they host the rehearsals of a jazz band. When Shibano goes next door to ask them to quiet down, he is invited by the wife of the household to stay and watch the rehearsal. She turns out to be the same woman who previously intervened in Shibano's fight in Tokyo. As the group practices and treats Shibano to drink, he listens to the song lyrics and becomes infected with the new jazz fever of the period. The song about the "Age of Speed" inspires him to go home and finish his script. The movie ends with a more modernized family reflecting on their differences from the local farmers.

== Cast ==
- Atsushi Watanabe as Shinsaku Shibano, the playwright
- Kinuyo Tanaka as Shibano's wife
- Satoko Date as Takiko Yamakawa, the neighbor's wife
- Mitsuko Ichimura as the playwright's daughter
- Shinichi Himori
- Yukiko Inoue
- Tokuji Kobayashi
- Takeshi Sakamoto

== Awards ==
- 1931 Kinema Junpo Award for Best Film

== Legacy ==
The Neighbor's Wife and Mine was screened at the Berkeley Art Museum and Pacific Film Archive in 1990 and at the Museum of Modern Art in 2015 as part of its retrospective on early Japanese sound films. In 2020, it was included in the British Film Institute's The best Japanese film of every year – from 1925 to now list.
