= Mitsuko Mito =

Japanese actress (1919–1981)

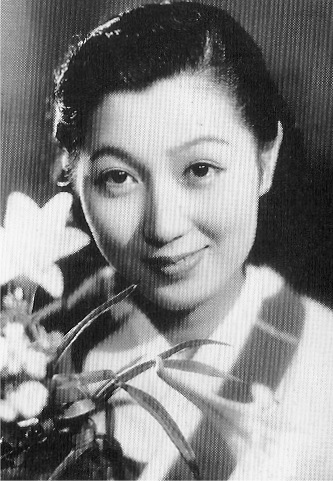
- Born: Mitsuko Sekiba; 23 March 1919; Sakaino, Niitsuru, Fukushima, Japan
- Died: 5 April 1981 (aged 62)
- Occupation: Actress
- Years active: 1935-1973

Mitsuko Mito (水戸光子, Mito Mitsuko; 23 March 1919 – 5 April 1981) was a Japanese actress. She appeared in more than 150 films between 1935 and 1973 under the direction of filmmakers like Kenji Mizoguchi, Yasujirō Ozu and Kaneto Shindō.

== Selected filmography ==
- Wakadanna haru ranman (1935) – Girl student
- Sendō kawaiya (1935)
- Mr. Thank You (1936)
- Hanayome karuta (1937) – Emako
- Kōjō no tsuki (1937) – Keiko
- Okusama ni shirasu bekarazu (1937) – Ohatsu
- Koi mo wasurete (1937) – Woman at hotel
- Suigō jōka – Kojō no reikon (1937) – Machiko
- Hanagata senshu (1937) – Girl at hiking
- Shingun no uta (1937)
- Haha to ko (1938)
- Aizen katsura (1938) – Kimura's Wife / Kimura's child
- Minamikaze (1939) – Keiko Kita
- Imōto no haregi (1939) – Kiyoko Sudō
- Zoku aizen katsura (1939) – Kimura's wife / Kimura's child
- Shin josei mondo (1939)
- Kuwa no mi wa akai (1939)
- Aizen katsura – Kanketsu-hen (1939) – Kimura's wife / Kimura's child
- Danryũ Part 1 and 2 (1939) – Gin Ishiwata
- Aizen tsubaki (1940)
- Kinuyo no hatsukoi (1940) – Onobu
- Hana wa itsuwarazu (1941) – Sumiko
- Sakura no kuni (1941)
- Soshu no yoru (1941)
- There Was a Father (1942) – Fumiko Hirata
- Kanchō imada shisezu (1942)
- Minami no kaze mizue no maki (1942)
- Hana saku minato (1943) – O-haru
- Hiwa Normanton jiken: Kamen no butō (1943) – Chie, Jun'nosuke's sister
- Kaigun (1943)
- Fuchinkan gekichin (1944)
- Suihei-san (1944)
- Kanko no machi (1944)
- Gekiryu (1944)
- Kimi koso tsugi no arawashi da (1944)
- Omitsu no endan (1946) – Omitsu
- Jōen (1947)
- Onnadake no yoru (1947)
- Woman (1948) – Toshiko
- Ōshō (1948) – Koharu
- Korosu ga gotoku (1948)
- Flame of My Love (1949) – Chiyo
- Watashi no na wa jofu (1949)
- Senka no hate (1950)
- Ai to nikushimi no kanata e (1951)
- Joshu Garasu (1951)
- Meigetsu somato (1951)
- Hibari no komoriuta (1951)
- The Tale of Genji (1951) – Aoi no ue
- Avalanche (1952) – Tokie Kijima
- Dedication of the Great Buddha (1952) – Sakuyako Tachibana
- Shino machi o nogarete (1952) – Asako Shimamura
- Ushiwakamaru (1952) – Tokiwa
- Ano te kono te (1952)
- Kaidan Fukagawa jowa(1952)
- Ugetsu (1953) – Ohama
- Yokubo (1953) – Sakie Kajiwara
- Tange Sazen (1953) – Ofuji
- Zoku Tange Sazen (1953) – Ofuji
- Konjiki yasha (1954) – Akagashi
- An Inn at Osaka (1954)
- Samurai I: Musashi Miyamoto (1954) – Oko, Matahachi's wife
- Shiode Kushima Binan Kenpo (1954)
- Shinsengumi Oni Taicho (1954)
- Onikiri wakasama (1955)
- Wataridori itsu kaeru (1955) – Chiyoko
- Samurai II: Duel at Ichijoji Temple (1955) – Oko, Akemi's mother
- Mune yori mune ni (1955) – Yuko Uemura
- Shin shokoku monogatari: Otena no tō – Zempen (1955) – Yũzomeni
- Shin shokoku monogatari: Otena no tō – Kōhen (1956) – Yũzomeni
- Gogo 8 ji 13 pun (1956) – Mitsue Kashimura
- I Will Buy You (1956) - Ryuko
- The Treasure of Gen. Yamashita (1956)
- Akuma no kao (1957) – Hama Kojima
- Morishige no Boku wa biyōshi (1957) – Chiyono
- Kuroi kafun (1958) – Okin
- Sorrow is Only for Women (1958) – Harue
- Ukiyo buro (1958) – O-riku
- Hana no yukyo-den (1958)
- Mayonaka no kao (1958)
- Haru o matsu hitobito (1959)
- Ballad of the Cart (1959) – Natsuno
- Hashi (1959) – Okiku
- Bōfũken (1959) – Shizue Tashiro
- Ningen no kabe (1959)
- The Wandering Princess (1960) – Izumi
- Arashi o yobu gakudan (1960) – Yukie Maki
- Koi ni inochi o (1961) – Teruyo Fuji
- Shin Genji monogatari (1961)
- Tsuma ari ko ari tomo arite (1961) – Takiyo Sugawa
- Senkyaku banrai (1962)
- Onnakeizu (1962) – Mrs. Kono
- Yatchaba no onna (1962)
- Gan (1966) – Osan
- Ohana han Part 1 and 2 (1966) – Teru Asao
- Daraku suru onna (1967) – Makiko
- Gekiryu (1967) – Chito Asuka
- Rikugun chōhō 33 (1968) – Tamiko Yamamoto
- Men and War (1970–73) – Otaki
