= Momoko Ishii =

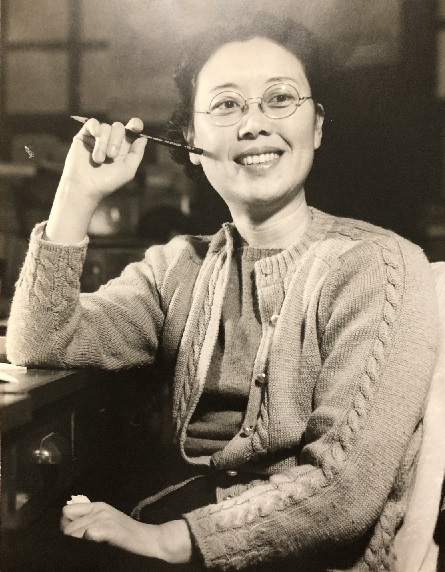
Ishii in 1953

Momoko Ishii (石井 桃子, Ishii Momoko; March 10, 1907 – April 2, 2008) was a Japanese writer and translator of children's books. She was the first member of the Japan Art Academy from the field of children's literature.

== Biography ==
Ishii was born in Urawa, Saitama, and graduated from the Japan Women's University with an English literature degree in 1928. While working as an editor at Iwanami Shoten Publishers, she decided to become a children's writer after reading Winnie-the-Pooh by English author A. A. Milne, which she translated in 1940. Her first book as an author, Non-chan kumo ni noru (Non-chan rides on a cloud) was published in 1947; a best-seller, it was made into a movie in 1955. All told, she published nineteen books of her own and 120 translations for children. In 1958, she started a library for children called "Katsura bunko" in her own house. She was awarded a grant from the Rockefeller Foundation in 1954.

Ishii received many honors in her life, including the Minister of Education Award for Promotion of Art for Non-chan kumo ni noru (1951), the Kikuchi Kan Award for achievement and contribution to the postwar world of children's literature (1953), the Itochu Memorial Foundation Award for Distinguished Service to Children's Bunko (1984), the Japanese Art Academy Award for achievement in the world of children's books (1993), and the 1994 Yomiuri Prize for her two-volume autobiographical novel Maboroshi No Akai Mi (Memoirs of a childhood) in 1995. In 1997, she became a member of the Japanese Art Academy, the first member from the field of children's literature.
