= Jitsuko Yoshimura =

Japanese actress

- 吉村実子
- Born: 18 April 1943 (age 83)
- Occupation: actress
- Years active: 1961–1970, 2004–2005
- Spouse: Tetsuo Ishidate (m. 1968–1999)
- Relatives: Mari Yoshimura (sister, actress)

Jitsuko Yoshimura (吉村実子, Yoshimura Jitsuko; born 18 April 1943) is a Japanese film and television actress. She was discovered by Shōhei Imamura as a newcomer and cast in the film Pigs and Battleships. She went on to appear in films like Imamura's The Insect Woman, Kaneto Shindō's Onibaba, for which she received the Blue Ribbon Award for Best Supporting Actress, and Akira Kurosawa's Dodes'ka-den. She retired from acting in 1970, but returned in 1980 and continues to work to this day.

Yoshimura was married to actor Tetsuo Ishidate from 1968 to 1999. Her sister is actress Mari Yoshimura (1935–).

== Filmography (selected) ==
Year	Title	Type	Role
1961	Pigs and Battleships	Film	Haruko
1963	The Insect Woman	Film	Nobuko
1964	Onibaba	Film	Younger woman
1965	An Innocent Witch	Film	Ayako Oshima
1966	Atout cœur à Tokyo pour OSS 117	Film	Tetsuko
1970	Cleopatra	Film	Mary/Lybia (voice)
1970	Dodes'ka-den	Film	Yoshie Kawaguchi
2004	Blooming Again	Film	Shizue
2005	Aibō season 3, episode 11	TV	Sachiko Sakai
