= Joji Ohara =

Japanese cinematographer (1902–1990)

Jōji Ohara
- 小原譲治
- Born: 27 September 1902; Tokyo
- Died: 24 June 1990 (aged 87); Los Angeles
- Occupation: Cinematographer

Jōji Ohara (小原 譲治, Ohara Jōji; 27 September 1902 – 24 June 1990) was a Japanese cinematographer.

== Career ==
Born in Tokyo, Ohara entered the Kamata section of the Shochiku film studios in 1924 and was promoted to cinematographer in 1927. Ohara helped establish the modern touch of the studio's cinematography at Kamata together with Bunjirō Mizutani and Mitsuo Miura, and is known for the soft tone of his images. He regularly worked for director Heinosuke Gosho on films like The Dancing Girl of Izu, Burden of Life and An Inn at Osaka.

Ohara later worked at Tokyo Hassei Eiga, Toho, Shintoho, and Daiei Film, and shot films for directors such as Akira Kurosawa, Yasujirō Ozu, Kenji Mizoguchi, Kōzaburō Yoshimura, Masahiro Makino and Shōhei Imamura. In 1954, he received the Mainichi Film Award for Best Cinematography for his work on The Valley Between Love and Death and The Cock Crows Twice.

== Selected filmography ==
- The Dancing Girl of Izu (1933)
- Somniloquy of the Bridegroom (Hanamuko no negoto) (1935)
- Burden of Life (Jinsei no onimotsu) (1935)
- Woman of the Mist (Oboroyo no onna) (1936)
- The New Road (Part one) (Shindō zenhen) (1936)
- The New Road (Part two) (Shindō kōhen) (1936)
- Ahen senso (1943)
- The Most Beautiful (1944)
- The Munekata Sisters (1950)
- Portrait of Madame Yuki (1950)
- An Inn at Osaka (Osaka no yado) (1954)
- Non-chan Kumo ni Noru (1955)
- Takekurabe (1955)
- Kisses (1957)
- Endless Desire (1958)
