= The Munekata Sisters =

1950 Japanese film by Yasujirō Ozu

- Theatrical release poster
- Directed by: Yasujirō Ozu
- Screenplay by: Yasujirō Ozu; Kōgo Noda
- Based on: Munekata shimai; by Jirō Osaragi
- Produced by: Hiroshi Higo; Hideo Koi
- Starring: Kinuyo Tanaka; Hideko Takamine; Sō Yamamura; Ken Uehara
- Cinematography: Jōji Ohara
- Edited by: Toshio Goto
- Music by: Ichirō Saitō
- Production company: Shintoho
- Distributed by: Shintoho
- Release date: 8 August 1950 (Japan)
- Running time: 112 minutes
- Country: Japan
- Language: Japanese

The Munekata Sisters (宗方姉妹, Munekata shimai) is a 1950 Japanese drama film directed by Yasujirō Ozu and starring Kinuyo Tanaka and Hideko Takamine. It is based on a novel by Jirō Osaragi.

== Synopsis ==
Setsuko Munekata lives with her much younger unmarried sister, Mariko, in Tokyo. Their widowed father is dying and has moved to the more traditional-Japanese city of Kyoto. Setsuko’s husband, Ryosuke Mimura (referred to as Mimura), is an unemployed engineer who habitually comes home drunk and shows no affection for her. She bears this in a resigned manner without complaint and supports them both by running a bar at which Mariko also works, but which is doing badly financially and is threatened with closure. Mariko criticizes Setsuko’s traditional attitudes and resignation her towards her husband’s behaviour, as opposed to her own ‘modern’ outlook to life.

The situation changes when on a visit to their father Mariko encounters Hiroshi Tashiro, a family acquaintance from before the war when they lived in Manchuria. At that time (about 15 years previously) Setsuko was about twenty-one and Mariko still at school. Setsuko and Hiroshi had been deeply attracted to one another then, but had not declared their love before circumstances took Hiroshi abroad, during which time Setsuko married. Hiroshi now has a flourishing hand-made furniture business in Kobe.

The drama hinges on an entry in a diary that Setsuko kept in which she describes a day she spent with Hiroshi by the sea in Manchuria. The entry is quite uncompromising, but when Mariko illicitly reads the diary she realizes that her sister had been in love with Hiroshi, who had never married. Mariko visits Hiroshi in Kobe, reveals that she has read the diary, and starts manoeuvring to reunite them and to destroy Hiroshi’s friendship with Yoriko Mashita, a widowed career-woman of a similar age to him whom she meets there. (In the course of her scheming on behalf of her sister she makes a pass at Hiroshi himself, although is laughingly rejected.)

Mariko writes to Hiroshi regarding their financial plight. He comes to Tokyo to see Setsuko and, after talking about old times, he offers her money to prevent closure of the bar. However Mimura has also illicitly read the entry in Setsuko’s diary and on learning of the loan suspects quite wrongly that she and Hiroshi are having an affair. He puts moral pressure on Setsuko so that she decides to refuse the loan. Mimura goes to the bar to drink and Mariko upbraids him about his behaviour, saying that he should get a job or otherwise give Setsuko a divorce. He returns home, accuses Setsuko of having wanted to divorce him for some time which, devastated, she denies. He refuses to believe her, implies she has been unfaithful to him and strikes her repeatedly.

When Mariko finds her in the aftermath of this, Setsuko says that she will divorce Mimura. She goes to Kobe to tell Hiroshi of her decision and he offers to inform Mimura, who was a fellow student in Manchuria. Hiroshi arranges a meeting with Mimura where the latter informs him that he has just found employment again and then leaves before Hiroshi can tell him of Setsuko’s decision. The following night in Tokyo Mimura returns to the house extremely drunk and falls dead from a heart attack.

There would now seem to be no obstacle to Setsuko accepting a proposal of marriage from Hiroshi, but she comes to the conclusion that Mimura had somehow killed himself deliberately because he knew she was about to leave him. She tells Hiroshi that she cannot marry him as this would cast a shadow over her and destroy their marriage. This course of action is the only way she can be true to herself. The film ends with an implied reconciliation of the two sisters in which Mariko acknowledges the legitimacy of Setsuko’s outlook on life, even though it differs from her own.

== Cast ==
- Kinuyo Tanaka as Setsuko Munekata
- Hideko Takamine as Mariko Munekata
- Chishū Ryū as Tadachika Munekata
- Sō Yamamura as Ryosuke Mimura
- Ken Uehara as Hiroshi Tashiro
- Sanae Takasugi as Yoriko Masako
- Fujiwara Kamatari

== Production ==
Ozu made this film with the newly-formed Shintoho Studios, the first of only three films he made outside Shochiku. It involved a departure from Ozu’s normal style of working in that the script was based on a novel and the actors were selected by the studio, which also insisted on a romantic interest alien to him. Although Ozu is on record as saying that he found the situation difficult, the film was finished on schedule.

== Reception ==
The film was never on general release in the west, so there are no contemporary reviews in English, but in a poll for the Japanese Kinema Junpo magazine critics voted it the seventh best film of 1950. It has a score of 89% on Rotten Tomatoes and 7.4/10 on IMDb.

== Home Media ==
The film was never distributed on DVD in the west, although it is now available for streaming from the Criterion Channel.
