= Love Letter (1953 film) =

1953 Japanese film

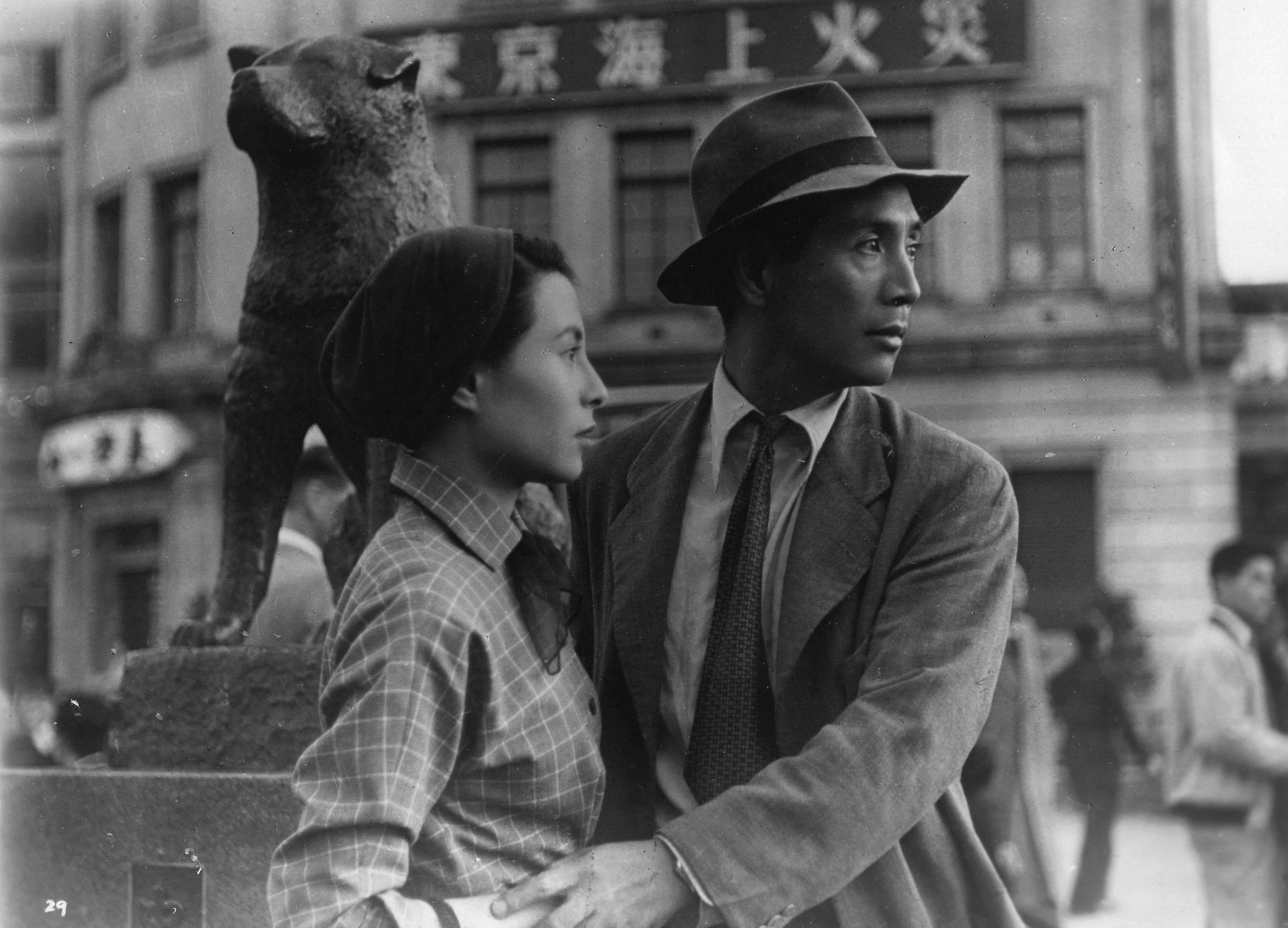
- Yoshiko Kuga and Masayuki Mori in front of Hachikō's statue
- Directed by: Kinuyo Tanaka
- Written by: Keisuke Kinoshita; Fumio Niwa (novel)
- Produced by: Ichirō Nagashima
- Starring: Masayuki Mori; Yoshiko Kuga
- Cinematography: Hiroshi Suzuki
- Music by: Ichirō Saitō
- Production company: Shintoho
- Distributed by: Shintoho
- Release date: 13 December 1953 (Japan)
- Running time: 98 minutes
- Country: Japan
- Language: Japanese

Love Letter (Japanese: 恋文, Hepburn: Koibumi) is a 1953 Japanese drama film and the first film directed by actress Kinuyo Tanaka. With her directing debut, Tanaka became the second female film director in Japan after Tazuko Sakane. The screenplay by Keisuke Kinoshita is based on a novel by Fumio Niwa.

== Cast ==
- Masayuki Mori as Reikichi Mayumi
- Jūzō Dosan as Hiroshi (Reikichi's brother)
- Yoshiko Kuga as Michiko Kubota
- Jūkichi Uno as Naoto Yamaji
- Kyōko Kagawa as Yasuko
- Shizue Natsukawa as Reikichi's mother
- Kinuyo Tanaka as landlady
- Chieko Seki as office lady
- Ranko Hanai as restaurant owner
- Chieko Nakakita as woman at restaurant
- Keisuke Kinoshita as photo studio owner

== Release ==
Love Letter was shown in competition at the 1954 Cannes Film Festival.

== Awards ==
- 1953 Mainichi Film Award for Best Screenplay for Keisuke Kinoshita (for Love Letter, A Japanese Tragedy and Sincere Heart)
- 1953 Blue Ribbon Award for Best Screenplay for Keisuke Kinoshita (for Love Letter, A Japanese Tragedy, Sincere Heart and Ai no sakyū)
