= The Maid's Kid =

1955 Japanese film

- Film poster
- Directed by: Tasaka Tomotaka
- Screenplay by: Tasaka Tomotaka; Susaki Katsuya
- Based on: Jochūkko by Yuki Shigeko
- Produced by: Ashida Shozo
- Starring: Hidari Sachiko; Iba Teruo; Sano Shūji; Todoroki Yukiko
- Cinematography: Isayama Saburo
- Edited by: Tsujii Masanori
- Music by: Ifukube Akira
- Production company: Nikkatsu
- Distributed by: Nikkatsu
- Release date: 26 June 1955 (Japan)
- Running time: 142 minutes
- Country: Japan
- Language: Japanese

- This article uses Eastern name order when mentioning individuals.

The Maid's Kid (女中ッ子, Jochūkko) is a 1955 black-and-white Japanese drama film directed by Tasaka Tomotaka. It is based on the novel of the same title by Yuki Shigeko.

The film reached place 7 in Kinema Junpo's Top Ten list of Japanese Films of 1955.

== Plot ==
In order to pay back Mrs. Kajiki for her good deed in the past, Hatsu moves from her village in Akita to Tokyo to start working as a maid for her family. She grows close to their youngest son Katsumi, experiencing things that will change her view on life.

== Cast ==
- Hidari Sachiko as Orimoto Hatsu
- Iba Teruo as Kajiki Katsumi
- Sano Shūji as Kajiki Kyohei
- Todoroki Yukiko as Kajiki Umeko
- Tanabe Yasuo as Kajiki Yukio
- Higashiyama Chieko as Hatsu's mother
- Takada Toshie as Nomura Hiroko
- Shishido Jō as Wakatsuki
- Hosokawa Chikako as Mrs. Noro
