= Flame of My Love =

Waga koi wa moenu
- Directed by: Kenji Mizoguchi
- Written by: Kaneto Shindō; Yoshikata Yoda; Kōgo Noda (story)
- Produced by: Toshio Itoya
- Starring: Kinuyo Tanaka; Mitsuko Mito; Kuniko Miyake; Ichirō Sugai
- Cinematography: Tomotarō Nashiki; Kōhei Sugiyama
- Edited by: Sakane Tazuko
- Music by: Senji Itō
- Production company: Shōchiku
- Distributed by: Shōchiku
- Release date: February 15, 1949
- Running time: 84 minutes
- Language: Japanese

Flame of My Love (わが恋は燃えぬ, Waga koi wa moenu) a.k.a. My Love Has Been Burning is a 1949 Japanese historical drama film directed by Kenji Mizoguchi. It is loosely based on the life of feminist Hideko Fukuda.

== Plot ==
After meeting with Meiji era feminist and Liberal Party member Toshiko Kishida, the school of young teacher Eiko in Okayama is closed by the prefecture officials. She leaves her oppressive environment for Tokyo, following her boyfriend Hayase, but Hayase acts reserved when she reunites with him. Omoi, a prominent Liberal Party politician, offers her a job at the party's newspaper. When Hayase is caught spying on the party for the government, she breaks ties with him and becomes Omoi's lover.

Eiko and Omoi are arrested during the turmoils of the Chichibu incident and sentenced to several years' imprisonment, where Eiko witnesses the same abuse of the female inmates as before of the women labourers in the textile mills. After the 1889 amnesty of political prisoners, Omoi regroups the party, supported by Eiko. When Eiko is confronted with Omoi's adulterous behaviour, which he blatantly asks her to accept, she realises that he too still nurtures an attitude of male preeminence. She announces to leave him and return to Okayama to establish a school for young women, convinced that only proper education can lead to female liberation.

== Cast ==
- Kinuyo Tanaka as Eiko Hirayama
- Mitsuko Mito as Chiyo
- Kuniko Miyake as Toshiko Kishida
- Ichirō Sugai as Kentarō Omoi
- Shinobu Araki as Eiko's father
- Sadako Sawamura as Governor
- Eitarō Ozawa as Hayase
- Koreya Senda as Inagaki
- Eijirō Tōno as Ito

== Reception ==
In his Critical Handbook of Japanese Film Directors, film scholar Alexander Jacoby rated Flame of My Love as one of "Mizoguchi's most outspoken films" and a "startling trenchant study of female emancipation" whose conclusion "remains unparalleled in Western popular film".
