= Yellow Crow =

1957 Japanese film

- Film poster
- Directed by: Heinosuke Gosho
- Written by: Keiji Hasebe; Kennosuke Tateoka; Shigeko Yuki (dialogue)
- Produced by: Jirō Kaga; Yoshishige Uchiyama
- Starring: Chikage Awashima; Yūnosuke Itō; Kōji Shitara; Yoshiko Kuga; Kinuyo Tanaka
- Cinematography: Yoshio Miyajima
- Edited by: Makoto Nagata
- Music by: Yasushi Akutagawa
- Production company: Kabuki-za
- Distributed by: Shochiku
- Release date: 27 February 1957 (Japan)
- Running time: 103 minutes
- Country: Japan
- Language: Japanese

Yellow Crow (Japanese: 黄色いからす, Hepburn: Kiiroi Karasu) is a 1957 Japanese drama film directed by Heinosuke Gosho.

== Plot ==
Kiyoshi Yoshida is a 9 year old boy who loves to draw. Although he shows some talent, his teacher is worried because he draws only in black and yellow, which can mean according to color psychology that the child has no parents or is unhappy in his family.

== Cast ==
- Chikage Awashima as Machiko Yoshida
- Kinuyo Tanaka as Yukiko Mataumoto
- Koji Shitara as Kiyoshi Yoshida
- Yūnosuke Itō as Ichirō Yoshida
- Yoshiko Kuga as Yasuko Achihara
- Chōko Iida as grandmother
- Yōichi Numata as Murakami

== Awards ==
- Golden Globe Award for Best Foreign Language Film 1958

== Legacy ==
Yellow Crow was screened at the Museum of Modern Art in 2022 as part of its "Beyond Ozu: Hidden Gems of Shochiku Studios" retrospective.
