= Sorrow Is Only for Women =

1958 Japanese film

- Directed by: Kaneto Shindō
- Written by: Kaneto Shindō
- Produced by: Hideo Nagata
- Starring: Kinuyo Tanaka; Machiko Kyō
- Cinematography: Yoshihisa Nakagawa
- Music by: Akira Ifukube
- Production company: Daiei Film
- Distributed by: Daiei Film
- Release date: 26 February 1958 (Japan)
- Running time: 105 minutes
- Country: Japan
- Language: Japanese

Sorrow Is Only for Women (悲しみは女だけに, Kanashimi wa onna dakeni) is a 1958 Japanese drama film written and directed by Kaneto Shindō. and starring Kinuyo Tanaka and Machiko Kyō.

== Cast ==
- Kinuyo Tanaka as Hideyo
- Machiko Kyō as Michiko
- Jūkichi Uno as Kishimoto
- Eiji Funakoshi as Hiroshi
- Reiko Hibiki as Toshi
- Kazuko Ichikawa as Yoshiko
- Naoyasu Itō as clerk
- Toshiko Kagiyama as Yuri
- Natsuko Kaji as Sakie
- Bontarō Miake as Yasuzō
- Mitsuko Mito as Harue
