= Life of a Woman =

1953 Japanese film

- Theatrical release poster
- Directed by: Kaneto Shindō
- Written by: Kaneto Shindō (screenplay); Guy de Maupassant (novel)
- Produced by: Kōzaburō Yoshimura; Katsuzô Shino
- Starring: Nobuko Otowa
- Cinematography: Takeo Itō
- Edited by: Hidetoshi Kasama
- Music by: Akira Ifukube
- Production company: Kindai Eiga Kyōkai
- Distributed by: Shintoho
- Release date: 23 November 1953 (Japan)
- Running time: 136 minutes; 70 minutes
- Country: Japan
- Language: Japanese

Life of a Woman (Japanese: 女の一生, Hepburn: Onna no issho) is a 1953 Japanese drama film directed by Kaneto Shindō and starring Nobuko Otowa and Koreya Senda. It was written by Shindō based on Guy de Maupassant's 1883 novel Une vie.

== Plot ==
Shortly after graduating from high school, Fujiko Shirakawa is married to Shintarō Yamazaki, whose parents run a lucrative restaurant. Fujiko soon finds out that not only her father-in-law has two mistresses, but that Shintarō has an affair with maid Yuki. Pregnant with Shintarō's child, Fujiko gives in to her parents' and parents-in-law's appeal to stay with her husband. When Yuki also turns out to be pregnant and is sent back to her parents, Fujiko manages to talk her parents-in-law into raising Yuki's son Jirō together with her own son Tarō in the Yamazaki household. Some time later, Shintarō dies, and with the outbreak of the Pacific War, Tarō and Jirō are mobilised.

After the end of the war, Fujiko manages the still flourishing restaurant of the Yamazaki family. Her son Tarō, who has returned from the war while Jirō has gone missing, rapes one of the maids and disappears. Fujiko takes in the maid's child to raise it in her household.

== Cast ==
- Nobuko Otowa as Fujiko Shirakawa
- Koreya Senda as Fujiko's father
- Jūkichi Uno as Masao, Fujiko's brother
- Akira Yamauchi as Shintarō Yamazaki
- Eitarō Shindō as Tokubei, Shintarō's father
- Haruko Sugimura as Tamae, Shintarō's mother
- Haruo Tanaka as Yoshihito Mizoguchi
- Tanie Kitabayashi as Tora, Yuki's mother
- Yuriko Hanabusa as Mitsue, Fujiko's mother
- Sumiko Hidaka as Yuki Kawakami
- Ranko Hanai as Harue
- Yukiko Todoroki as Hanayu
- Ichirō Sugai as Kichimatsu, Yuki's father
- Eijirō Tōno as Kyūzaemon
- Eijirō Yanagi as Hamamura
- Taiji Tonoyama as Tomekichi

== Reception ==
Reviewing the film in their 1959 book The Japanese Film – Art & Industry, Donald Richie and Joseph L. Anderson saw a "strong evocation of the past", but faulted Shindō for going too far in the depiction of the story's "unpleasant aspects".
