= Ellora Symphony =

Yasushi Akutagawa's Ellora Symphony was composed in 1958 after a visit to the Ellora Caves in Aurangabad, India. One of several Japanese primitivistic symphonies composed in the 1950s, including Akira Ifukube's Sinfonia Tapkaara and Kan Ishii's Sinfonia Ainu, it is representative of Akutagawa's most adventurous period, when he associated Toru Takemitsu and Toshiro Mayuzumi and embraced avant-garde music.

Instead of the traditional multi-movement layout, which Akutagawa had used in his Shostakovichian Prima Sinfonia three years earlier, the Ellora Symphony is structured in fifteen sequences: eight caressing "feminine" fragments marked Adagio or Andante and seven aggressive "masculine" ones marked Allegro. The later assemble mainly in the last half of the work, translating in an Introduction and Allegro-like form.
