= Yotsuya Kaidan (1956 film) =

Yotsuya Kaidan 四谷怪談
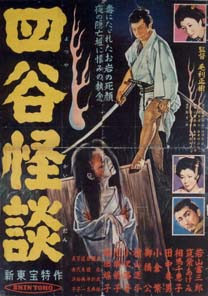
- Japanese movie poster
- Directed by: Masaki Mori
- Written by: Hideo Oguni; Torao Tanabe
- Produced by: Ryosuke Okamoto
- Starring: Tomisaburo Wakayama; Chouko Iida; Shigeru Ogura; Haruo Tanaka
- Cinematography: Hiroshi Suzuki
- Edited by: Toshio Goto
- Music by: Urato Watanabe
- Production company: Shintoho
- Release date: 12 July 1956 (Japan)
- Running time: 86 minutes
- Country: Japan
- Language: Japanese

Yotsuya Kaidan (Japanese: 四谷怪談) is a 1956 black-and-white Japanese film directed by Masaki Mori. It is a Japanese horror film based on the Japanese ghost story (kaidan) about Oiwa and Tamiya Iemon.

== Cast ==
- Tomisaburo Wakayama as Iemon (Tamiya Iemon)
- (相馬千恵子) as Oiwa
- Chouko Iida (飯田蝶子)
- Shigeru Ogura
- Haruo Tanaka

== See also ==
- Film adaptations of the Yotsuya Kaidan story
