= Aiyoku no ki =

1930 Japanese film

- Film poster
- Directed by: Heinosuke Gosho
- Written by: Akira Fushimi
- Starring: Kinuyo Tanaka
- Cinematography: Mitsuo Miura
- Production company: Shochiku
- Distributed by: Shochiku
- Release date: 10 November 1930 (Japan)
- Running time: 8 reels; (80–120 minutes) (Note: Approximately 80–120 minutes, depending on projection speed. Kawin, Bruce F. (1987). How Movies Work. University of California Press. pp. 46–47. ISBN 978-0-52007696-9.)
- Country: Japan
- Language: Japanese (intertitles)

Record of Love and Desire a.k.a. Desire of Night (Japanese: 愛慾の記 (Note: The Japanese Movie Database and Shochiku.co.jp give 愛慾の記 as the original title, while Kinenote spells it 愛欲の記.), Hepburn: Aiyoku no ki; lit. Memories of Love and Desire) is a 1930 Japanese silent film directed by Heinosuke Gosho, starring Kinuyo Tanaka and Ichirō Yuki.

== Cast ==
- Kinuyo Tanaka
- Ichirō Yuki
- Kikuko Hanaoka
- Jun Arai
- Kimiko Hikari
- Hikaru Yamanouchi
