= Shoshimin-eiga =

Japanese film genre

Shōshimin-eiga (小市民 映画), literally "petty bourgeois film" or "lower middle class film", is a genre of Japanese realist films which focus on the everyday lives of ordinary or middle class people. An alternate term for the shōshimin-eiga is the pseudo-Japanese word shomin-geki, literally "common people drama", which had been invented by Western film scholars. The term shōshimin-eiga as a definition of a specifically Japanese film genre presumably first appeared in 1932 in articles by critics Yoshio Ikeda and Ichiro Ueno.

== Themes ==
Film historians Joseph L. Anderson and Donald Richie define the shōshimin-eiga (addressing it as shomin-geki) as "[e]ssentially a film about proletarian or lower-middle-class life, about the sometimes humorous, sometimes bitter relations within the family, about the struggle for existence, [...] the kind of film many Japanese think of as being about 'you and me'."

In her book Nippon Modern: Japanese Cinema of the 1920s and 1930s, Mitsuyo Wada-Marciano sees the shōshimin-eiga depicting a "newly emerging modern subject, the salaried man, and his middle-class family", which "appealed to a broad cross-section of social classes", thereby helping to create "a modern national subject". Through their portrayal of social inequalities and capitalism's extended reach on daily life in the shape of company hierarchy, these films suggested a split between Japan's call for modernisation and the longing for the "mystic cohesion" of a "traditional" past. At the same time, the shōshimin-eiga was criticised for a lack of genuine political content especially from the political left.

== History ==
The beginnings of the shōshimin-eiga are assigned to the Shochiku film studio and its director Yasujirō Shimazu in the 1920s. Yasujirō Ozu, a former assistant of Shimazu, and Mikio Naruse are two prominent directors considered to work primarily in the field of the shōshimin-eiga. Others include Heinosuke Gosho and Keisuke Kinoshita. Kenji Mizoguchi, although having repeatedly turned to modern subjects, the oppression of women under a patriarchical system in particular, is usually not assigned to the genre canon.

Important early (and extant) examples of the shōshimin-eiga are Shimazu's Our Neighbor, Miss Yae (1934), Ozu's Tokyo Chorus (1931) and I Was Born, But... (1932), and Gosho's Burden of Life (1935). Naruse's 1951 film Repast is often cited as having launched a post-occupation revival of the shōshimin-eiga. Gosho biographer Arthur Nolletti, Jr. regards the early 1960s as the end of the genre's golden age, with its themes moving mainly to television. Both he and film historian Catherine Russell see it sustained in works like the Tora-san series.

== See also ==
- Tendency film
