= Kinuyo Tanaka =

Japanese actress and film director (1909–1977)

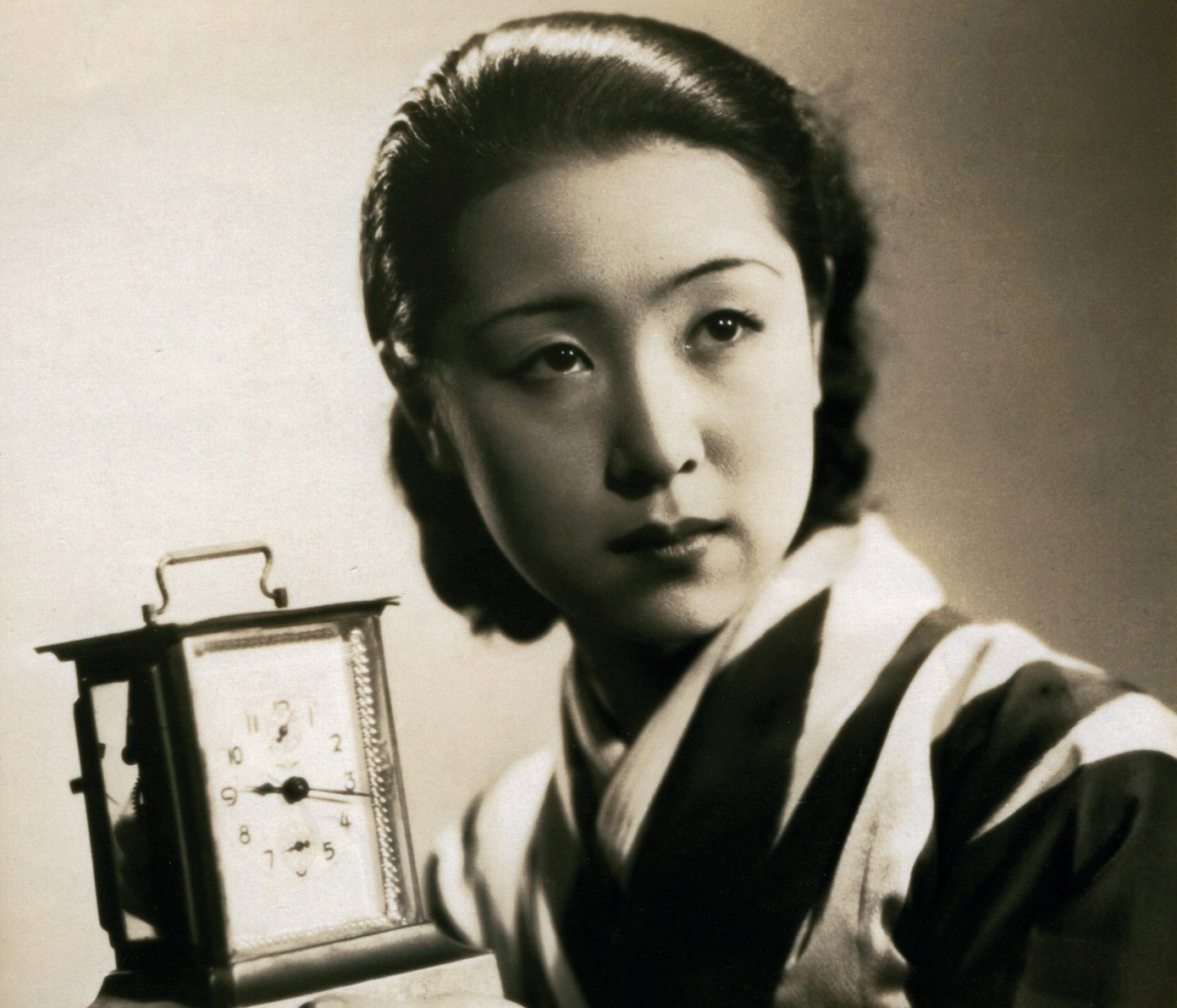
- Tanaka in Burden of Life (1935)
- Born: 29 November 1909; Shimonoseki, Yamaguchi Prefecture, Empire of Japan
- Died: 21 March 1977 (aged 67); Tokyo, Japan
- Occupations: Actress, film director
- Years active: 1924–1976
- Partner: Hiroshi Shimizu (1927–1929)
- Relatives: Masaki Kobayashi (second cousin)
- Awards: Mainichi Film Concours For Best Actress; Mainichi Film Concours For Best Supporting Actress; Kinema Junpo Award for Best Actress; Silver Bear for Best Actress

Kinuyo Tanaka (Japanese: 田中 絹代, Hepburn: Tanaka Kinuyo; 29 November 1909 – 21 March 1977) was a Japanese actress and film director. She had a career lasting over 50 years with more than 250 acting credits, but was best known for her 15 films with director Kenji Mizoguchi, such as The Life of Oharu (1952) and Ugetsu (1953). With her 1953 directorial debut, Love Letter, Tanaka became the second Japanese woman to direct a film, after Tazuko Sakane. Tanaka won the Silver Bear for Best Actress for her performance in the film Sandakan No. 8 (1974).

== Biography ==
=== Early life and career ===
Tanaka was born in Shimonoseki, Yamaguchi Prefecture, the youngest of nine children of Kumekichi and Yasu Tanaka. Her family were kimono merchants. Although her family was originally wealthy, after her father Kumekichi died in 1912, the family began having financial troubles. She learned playing the biwa at an early age and moved to Osaka in 1920, where she joined the Biwa Girls' Operetta Troupe. Tanaka's first credited film appearance was in Genroku Onna (lit. "A Woman of the Genroku era") in 1924, which also marked the start of her affiliation with the Shochiku Studios. She lived with director Hiroshi Shimizu from 1927 to 1929 after appearing in a number of his films; although they separated in 1929, she starred in some of his later films. Tanaka remained unmarried for her entire life and had no children.

She became a leading actress at an early age, appearing in Yasujirō Ozu's I Graduated, But... in 1929. The following year she played the lead in Aiyoku no ki (Record of Love and Desire or Desire of Night), and in 1931 she appeared in Japan's first sound film, The Neighbor's Wife and Mine, directed by Heinosuke Gosho. Gosho also directed her in his adaptation of the famous Yasunari Kawabata story, The Dancing Girl of Izu (1933). In the 1930s, Tanaka became so popular that the titles of many feature films used her name, as in Kinuyo Monogatari ("The Kinuyo Story"), Joi Kinuyo Sensei ("Doctor Kinuyo") and Kinuyo no Hatsukoi ("Kinuyo's First Love"). In 1938, she starred in Hiromasa Nomura's Aizen katsura with Ken Uehara, who was the highest-grossing movie of the prewar period. In 1940, she worked with Kenji Mizoguchi for the first time, starring in Naniwa Onna ("A Woman of Osaka"), which is regarded as a lost film. The following year, she appeared in Ornamental Hairpin, directed by Shimizu, which nowadays ranks, also thanks to Tanaka's performance, as one of the director's most mature achievements. 1944 saw her first collaboration with director Keisuke Kinoshita in the patriotic piece Army. The film became famous for its finale which, a subversion of its militarist message, showed a mother (Tanaka) desperately trying to catch a last glimpse of her son who is marching off to war.

=== Post-war career ===
Screenwriter Yoshikata Yoda, Kinuyo Tanaka and Kenji Mizoguchi visit Paris, 1953

Starting in October 1949, Tanaka made a three-month trip to the United States as one of Japan's first post-war cultural envoys. On her return, Tanaka displayed an inheritance of cultural mannerisms from America which many of her fans found distasteful. She resigned from Shochiku and announced her intention of going freelance, which would give her more scope to choose which directors she wished to work with. She subsequently worked on films with Mikio Naruse, Ozu, Kinoshita, Gosho and others. She had a close working relationship with director Kenji Mizoguchi, having parts in 15 of his films, including leading roles in The Life of Oharu (1952), Ugetsu (1953) and Sansho the Bailiff (1954). A recurrent topic of these films, both contemporary and historic dramas, was the fate of women mistreated by family, lovers and society. Tanaka's and Mizoguchi's involvement was the subject of much speculation, on which the actress commented in the 1975 documentary Kenji Mizoguchi: The Life of a Film Director that she and Mizoguchi were "married in front of the camera, but not behind it". Their working relationship ended when Mizoguchi countered a recommendation from the Directors Guild of Japan for the Nikkatsu studio to hire her as a director.

=== Director and actress ===
Tanaka was the second Japanese woman who worked as a film director, after Tazuko Sakane. Despite Mizoguchi's objection against her application, Tanaka was able to give her directing debut with Love Letter in 1953. Scripted by Kinoshita, it was entered as a contestant in the Cannes Film Festival in 1954. She directed five more films between 1953 and 1962, focusing on the subject of femininity; while her films received less attention from contemporary commentators and Tanaka herself downplayed them, interest in them has been revived in recent years for their unique and pioneering portrayals of Japanese women. The Moon Has Risen (Tsuki wa noborinu) in 1955 was scripted by Yasujirō Ozu, and The Wandering Princess (Ruten no onna) was scripted by Natto Wada and starred Machiko Kyō. One of Tanaka's most acknowledged films, The Eternal Breasts, follows the biography of the late tanka poet Fumiko Nakajo (1922–1954). In addition to her directing jobs, Tanaka continued with her acting career, appearing in Kinoshita's The Ballad Of Narayama (1958), for which she received the Kinema Junpo Award for Best Actress, and in Akira Kurosawa's Red Beard (1965). During the 1960s, she moved increasingly towards television. For her performance as an aged prostitute in Kei Kumai's 1975 Sandakan N° 8 she won the Best Actress Award at the 25th Berlin International Film Festival.

Tanaka died of a brain tumor on 21 March 1977.

== Legacy ==
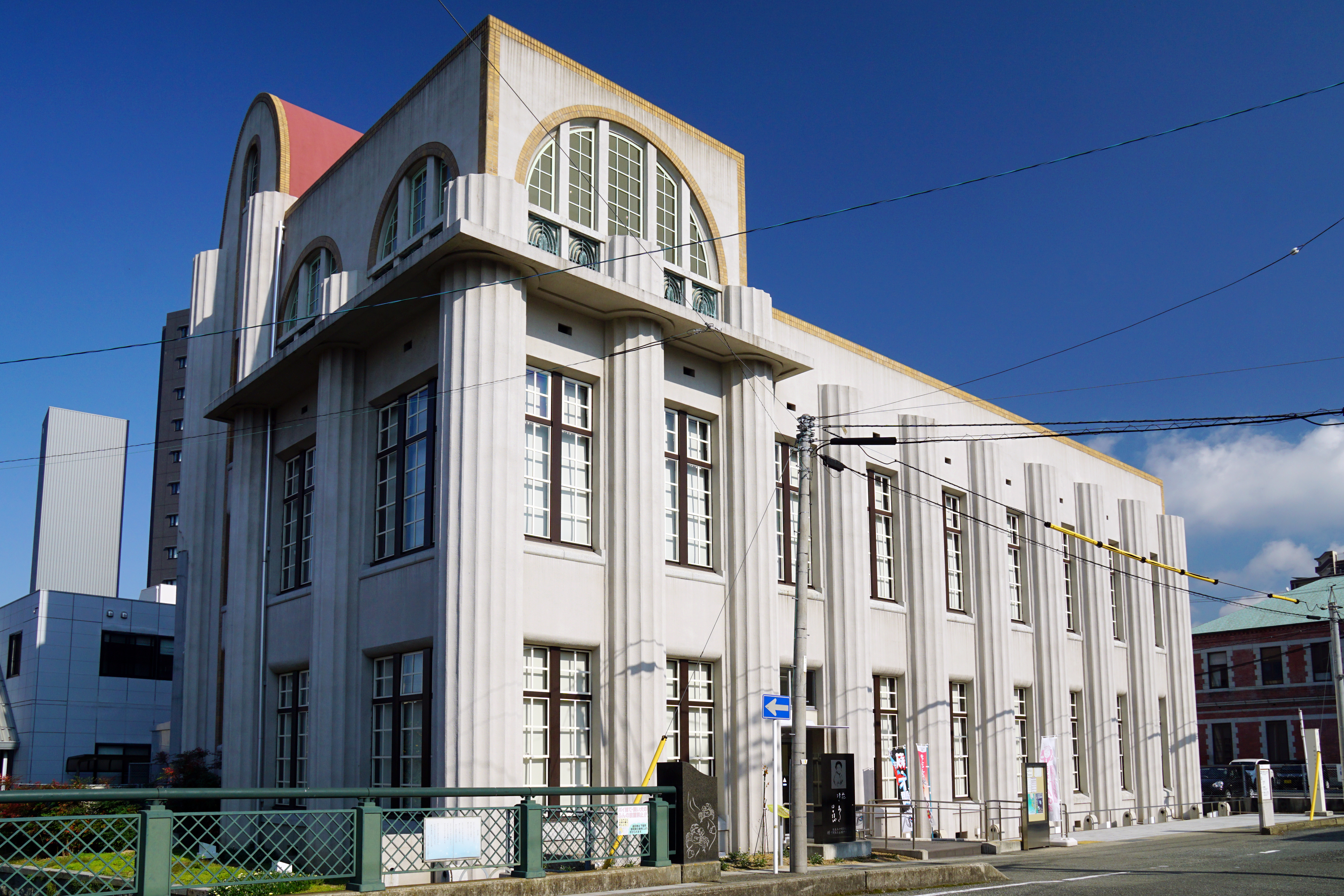
A museum in Tanaka's hometown is nicknamed the "Kinuyo Tanaka Cultural Museum" in her honor.

Director Masaki Kobayashi, to whom she was second cousin, initiated an award bearing her name. Since 1985, the Kinuyo Tanaka Award (田中絹代賞) for an actress' works and career is awarded at the annual Mainichi Film Concours ceremony.

A 22-film retrospective of Tanaka's acting and directorial work, her first U.S. retrospective including U.S. premieres of her directorial efforts, was held from January 15-April 30, 1993 at Japan Society.

A wave of renewed international interest in Tanaka's work started in 2012 with a symposium and retrospective at the University of Leeds. In 2018, Irene Gonzalez-Lopez and Michael Smith published the first English-language collection on Tanaka's work and life, Tanaka Kinuyo: Nation, Stardom and Female Subjectivity. In 2020, artistic director of the Locarno Film Festival Lili Hinstin announced a major retrospective dedicated to Tanaka actress and director, postponed in 2021 due to the Covid Pandemic situation and then cancelled after she left the festival.

In 2021, all six of the films Tanaka directed were screened theatrically in digitally remastered versions at the Cannes Film Festival and the Lyon Film Festival. Three of these films were presented in 4K restorations at the 34th Tokyo International Film Festival.

== Filmography ==
=== Actress (partial) ===
Tanaka appeared in 258 films, not counting TV appearances.

- 1929: I Graduated, But... (大学は出たけれど, Daigaku wa detakeredo) – directed by Yasujirō Ozu
- 1929: The Blacksmith of the Forest (森の鍛冶屋, Mori no kajiya) – directed by Hiroshi Shimizu
- 1930: I Flunked, But... (落第はしたけれど, Rakudai wa shitakeredo) – directed by Yasujirō Ozu
- 1930: The Army Advances (進軍, Shingun) – directed by Kiyohiko Ushihara
- 1931: The Neighbor's Wife and Mine (マダムと女房, Madamu to nyōbō) – directed by Heinosuke Gosho
- 1932: Konjiki Yasha (金色夜叉) – directed by Hōtei Nomura
- 1932: Where Now are the Dreams of Youth (青春の夢いまいづこ, Seishun no yume ima izuko) – directed by Yasujirō Ozu
- 1933: The Dancing Girl of Izu (恋の花咲く 伊豆の踊子, Koi no hana saku Izu no odoriko) – directed by Heinosuke Gosho
- 1933: Woman of Tokyo (東京の女, Tōkyō no onna) – directed by Yasujirō Ozu
- 1933: Dragnet Girl (非常線の女, Hijōsen no onna) – directed by Yasujirō Ozu
- 1934: The Appearance in the love of Osayo (お小夜恋姿, Osayo koi Sugata) – directed by Yasujirô Shimazu
- 1935: Okoto and Sasuke (春琴抄 お琴と佐助, Shunkinshō Okoto to Sasuke) – directed by Yasujirō Shimazu
- 1935: Burden of Life (人生のお荷物, Jinsei no onimotsu) – directed by Heinosuke Gosho
- 1938: Flower in Storm (愛染かつら, Aizen katsura) – directed by Hiromasa Nomura
- 1941: Ornamental Hairpin (簪, Kanzashi) – directed by Hiroshi Shimizu
- 1944: Army (陸軍, Rikugun) – directed by Keisuke Kinoshita
- 1944: The Swordsman (宮本武蔵, Miyamoto Musashi) – directed by Kenji Mizoguchi
- 1945: A Tale of Archery at the Sanjusangendo (三十三間堂通し矢物語, Sanjūsangendō tōshiya monogatari) – directed by Mikio Naruse
- 1946: Utamaro and His Five Women a.k.a. Five Women Around Utamaro (歌麿をめぐる五人の女, Utamaro o meguru gonin no onna) – directed by Kenji Mizoguchi
- 1947: The Love of Sumako the Actress (女優須磨子の恋, Joyū Sumako no koi) – directed by Kenji Mizoguchi
- 1948: Women of the Night (Yoru no onnatachi) – directed by Kenji Mizoguchi
- 1948: A Hen in the Wind (風の中の牝鶏, Kaze no naka no mendori) – directed by Yasujirō Ozu
- 1949: Flame of My Love a.k.a. My Love Has Been Burning (わが恋は燃えぬ, Waga koi wa moenu) – directed by Kenji Mizoguchi
- 1950: Wedding Ring a.k.a. Engagement Ring (婚約指環, Kon'yaku yubiwa) – directed by Keisuke Kinoshita
- 1950: The Munekata Sisters (宗方姉妹, Munekata kyōdai) – directed by Yasujirō Ozu
- 1951: The Inner Palace Conspiracy (おぼろ駕籠, Oboro kago) – directed by Daisuke Itō
- 1951: Ginza Cosmetics (銀座化粧, Ginza keshō) (1951) – directed by Mikio Naruse
- 1951: Miss Oyu (お遊さま, Oyū-sama) – directed by Kenji Mizoguchi
- 1951: The Lady of Musashino a.k.a. Lady Musashino (武蔵野夫人, Musashino fujin) – directed by Kenji Mizoguchi
- 1952: The Life of Oharu (西鶴一代女, Saikaku ichidai onna) – directed by Kenji Mizoguchi
- 1952: Mother (おかあさん, Okaasan) – directed by Mikio Naruse
- 1953: Where Chimneys Are Seen a.k.a. Four Chimneys (煙突の見える場所, Entotsu no mieru basho) – directed by Heinosuke Gosho
- 1953: Ugetsu a.k.a. Tales of Ugetsu (雨月物語, Ugetsu monogatari) – directed by Kenji Mizoguchi
- 1954: Sansho the Bailiff (山椒太夫, Sanshō dayū) – directed by Kenji Mizoguchi
- 1954: Onna no Koyomi (女の暦) – directed by Seiji Hisamatsu
- 1954: The Woman in the Rumor a.k.a. The Crucified Woman (噂の女, Uwasa no onna) – directed by Kenji Mizoguchi
- 1956: Arashi (嵐) – directed by Hiroshi Inagaki
- 1956: Flowing (流れる, Nagareru) – directed by Mikio Naruse
- 1957: Yellow Crow (黄色いからす, Kiiroi karasu) – directed by Heinosuke Gosho
- 1957: Stepbrothers (異母兄弟, Ibo kyōdai) – directed by Miyoji Ieki
- 1958: Equinox Flower (彼岸花, Higanbana) – directed by Yasujirō Ozu
- 1958: The Ballad Of Narayama (楢山節考 Narayamabushi-ko) – directed by Keisuke Kinoshita
- 1958: Sorrow is Only for Women (悲しみは女だけに, Kanashimi wa onna dakeni) – directed by Kaneto Shindō
- 1960: Her Brother (おとうと, Otōto) – directed by Kon Ichikawa
- 1962: A Wanderer's Notebook a.k.a. Her Lonely Lane (放浪記, Hōrōki) – directed by Naruse Mikio
- 1963: Alone Across the Pacific (太平洋ひとりぼっち, Taiheiyō hitori-botchi) – directed by Kon Ichikawa
- 1963: A Legend or Was It? – directed by Keisuke Kinoshita
- 1964: The Scent of Incense (香華, Kōge) – directed by Keisuke Kinoshita
- 1965: Red Beard (赤ひげ, Akahige) – directed by Akira Kurosawa
- 1966: Futari no hoshi (二人の星) – television drama, TBS
- 1967: Momotarō-zamurai (桃太郎侍) – television drama, NTV
- 1970: Momi no ki wa nokotta (樅ノ木は残った) – television drama, NHK
- 1970: Asu no shiawase (明日のしあわせ) – television drama, NET
- 1971: Nyonin Heike (女人平家) – television drama, ABC
- 1973: Singular rebellion (たった一人の反乱 Tatta hitori no hanran) – television drama, NHK
- 1974: Sandakan No. 8 (サンダカン八番娼館 望郷, Sandakan hachiban shōkan: bōkyō) – directed by Kei Kumai
- 1974: Rin rin to (りんりんと) – television drama, HBC
- 1974: Jaane (じゃあね) – television drama, NHK
- 1975: Kenji Mizoguchi: The Life of a Film Director (ある映画監督の生涯 溝口健二の記録, Aru eiga-kantoku no shōgai Mizoguchi Kenji no kiroku) – directed by Kaneto Shindō
- 1975-1977: Zenryaku ofukurosama (前略おふくろ様) – television drama, NTV
- 1976: Kita No misaki (北の岬) – directed by Kei Kumai
- 1976: Maboroshi no machi (幻の町) – television drama, HBC
- 1976: Kumo no jūtan (雲のじゅうたん) – appeared as a narrator, television drama, NHK
- 1976: Sekishun no uta (惜春の歌) – television drama, CBC
- 1976: Lullaby of the Earth (大地の子守歌, Daichi no komoriuta) – directed by Yasuzo Masumura

=== Director (complete) ===
- 1953: Love Letter (Koibumi)
- 1955: The Moon Has Risen (Tsuki wa norinu)
- 1955: The Eternal Breasts (Chibusa yo eien nare)
- 1960: The Wandering Princess (Ruten no ōhi)
- 1961: Girls of the Night (Onna bakari no yoru)
- 1962: Love Under the Crucifix (Ogin sama)

== Honours and awards ==
- Mainichi Film Concours For Best Actress for Marriage, The Love of Sumako the Actress, A Hen in the Wind, Women of the Night and Sandakan No. 8
- Mainichi Film Concours For Best Supporting Actress for Ibo kyoudai, Chijo, Kottaisan yori: Nyotai wa kanashiku and Her Brother
- Kinema Junpo Award for Best Actress for The Ballad Of Narayama and Sandakan No. 8
- Silver Bear for Best Actress for Sandakan No. 8
- Medal with Purple Ribbon (1970)
- Order of the Sacred Treasure, 3rd class, Gold Rays with Neck Ribbon (1977, posthumous)

== See also ==
- Category:Films directed by Kinuyo Tanaka
