= Army (1944 film) =

- Film poster
- Kanji: 陸軍
- Directed by: Keisuke Kinoshita
- Screenplay by: Tadao Ikeda
- Story by: Shohei Hino
- Produced by: Kenichiro Yasuda
- Starring: Chishū Ryū; Kinuyo Tanaka; Kazumasa Hoshino
- Cinematography: Yoshio Taketomi
- Production company: Shochiku
- Release date: 1944
- Running time: 87 minutes
- Country: Japan
- Language: Japanese

Army (Japanese: 陸軍, Hepburn: Rikugun) is a 1944 Japanese film directed by Keisuke Kinoshita and starring Chishū Ryū and Kinuyo Tanaka. It is best known for its final scene, which Japanese World War II censors found troubling.

== Summary ==
Army tells the story of three generations of a Japanese family and their relationship with the army from the Meiji era through the Japanese invasion of Manchuria. Ryu plays the man of the middle generation, Tomohiko, and Tanaka his wife Waka. A large portion of the movie concerns Tomohiko's and Waka's concern that their oldest son Shintaro will be too weak to become a good soldier and their efforts to mold him into one. Other portions of the movie include Tomohiko's own exclusion from fighting during the Russo-Japanese War due to illness, and his later indignation when a friend suggests that Japan could lose a war.

== Ending and reactions ==
In the wordless final scene of the movie, Shintaro marches off with the army for deployment in the invasion of Manchuria. Tanaka's character runs alongside him tearfully and expresses her anxiety over his well-being. Japanese wartime censors were upset by this scene because Japanese mothers in films were supposed be depicted as being proud to send their sons to battle, and not being at all upset about it. According to film critic Donald Richie, the scene was spared being cut because arguably Tanaka's emotions were caused by her internal conflict between her duty to be happy to send her son off to war and her own selfishness by loving and trying to possess him. Criterion Collection essayist Michael Koresky and others attribute the fact that the script escaped censorship of this scene to the fact that the scene is wordless, and so in the script it merely states "The mother sees the son off at the station". Koresky attributes the scene's power to purely cinematic elements, i.e., "expressive cutting, the variations in camera distance, Tanaka’s stunning performance."

As a result of the final scene, which according to Richie was called "deplorable and an unnecessary stain on an otherwise fine film," Kinoshita was subjected to enhanced attention from the censors until the end of the war. Reportedly, an army officer stormed into the Shochiku film studio after the film's premiere on November 22, 1944, accusing Kinoshita of treason. He would not be permitted to release another film until after the war ended.

According to author Alexander Jacoby, Army is superficially conformist but the final scene is an expression of Kinoshita's "antimilitarist sentiments." Kinoshita later stated that "I can’t lie to myself in my dramas. I couldn’t direct something that was like shaking hands and saying, ‘Come die.’”

== Cast ==
- Chishū Ryū as Tomohiko as an adult
- Kinuyo Tanaka as Waka
- Kazumasa Hoshino as Shintaro
