= Isuzu Yamada =

Japanese actress (1917–2012)

Isuzu Yamada Junior Third Rank
- 山田 五十鈴
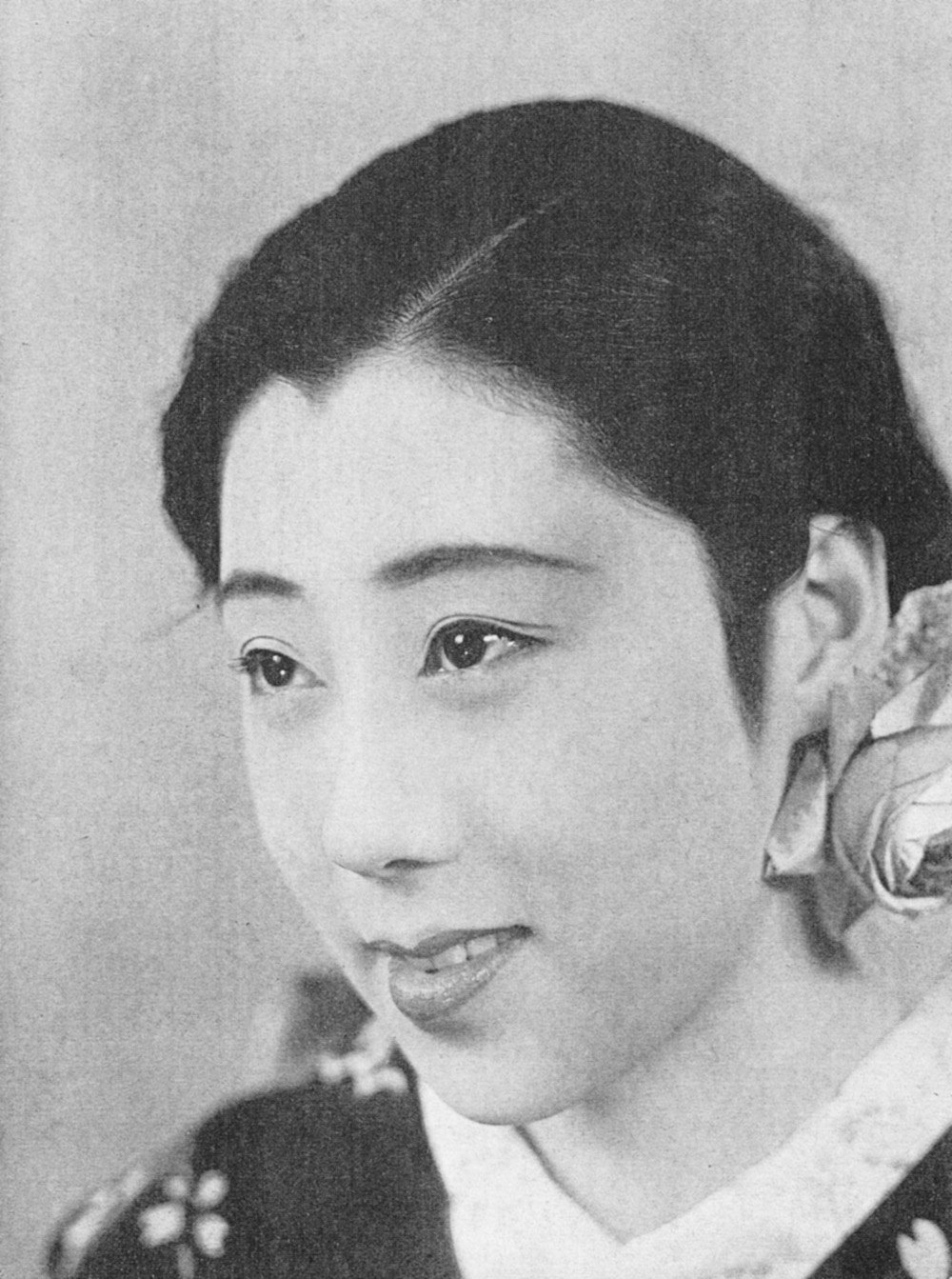
- Isuzu Yamada in 1937
- Born: Mitsu Yamada; 5 February 1917; Osaka, Japan
- Died: 9 July 2012 (aged 95); Tokyo, Japan
- Occupation: Actress
- Years active: 1930–2002

Isuzu Yamada (山田 五十鈴, Yamada Isuzu; 5 February 1917 – 9 July 2012) was a Japanese stage and screen actress whose career spanned seven decades.

== Life and career ==
Yamada was born in Osaka on 5 February 1917, as Mitsu Yamada, the daughter of Kusudu Yamada, a shinpa actor specialising in onnagata roles, and Ritsu, a geisha. Under her mother's influence, she began learning nagauta and Japanese traditional dance from the age of six.

Yamada debuted as a film actress in 1930 at age twelve, appearing in the Nikkatsu film Tsurugi wo koete opposite Denjirō Ōkōchi. She soon became one of Nikkatsu's top actresses, but it was her portrayals of strong-willed modern girls in Kenji Mizoguchi's Osaka Elegy and Sisters of the Gion in 1936 at the new Daiichi Eiga studio that earned her popularity and critical acclaim. Moving to Shinkō Kinema and then to Toho, she became a star with Mikio Naruse's Tsuruhachi and Tsurujiro (1938), appearing at the side of Kazuo Hasegawa. During World War II, she established the theatre group Shin Engi-za together with Hasegawa, and appeared in films such as Naruse's The Song Lantern (1943) and The Way of Drama (Shibaido, 1944).

In 1946, in opposition to the union strike at Toho, Yamada sided with the anti-unionist group "Jū hito no hata no kai" ("Society of the Flag of Ten"), which consisted of Hasegawa, Setsuko Hara, Hideko Takamine and others. She moved from Toho to the Shintoho studios, but later left Shintoho as well to become a freelancer. She married leftist actor Yoshi Katō, her third husband, and in the wake returned to the union, joined the Mingei Theatre Company and co-founded the Gendai Haiyu Kyokai theatre group.

During the second half of the 1950s, Yamada's main attention shifted towards the stage, but she still appeared in a number of distinguished films like Naruse's Flowing (1956), Yasujirō Ozu's Tokyo Twilight (1957) and Akira Kurosawa's The Lower Depths (1957) and Throne of Blood (1957). Other directors she worked with during this decade include Keisuke Kinoshita, Kaneto Shindō and Shirō Toyoda. In addition to her theatre engagements, she appeared on television, including the long-running Hissatsu series. Her last TV appearance was in 2002.

Yamada died from multiple organ failure in Tokyo, on 9 July 2012, at the age of 95. She was married four times, to actor Ichirō Tsukita, to producer Kazuo Takimura, to actor Yoshi Katō, and to actor Tsutomu Shimomoto. Her daughter with Tsukita, Michiko, became known as the actress Michiko Saga (1935–1992).

== Awards (selected) ==
Yamada earned the Blue Ribbon Award and the Mainichi Film Award For Best Actress simultaneously two times: in 1952 for Gendai-jin and Hakone fūunroku, and in 1956 for Boshizō, A Cat, Shozo, and Two Women, and Flowing. She also received the Blue Ribbon Award For Best Supporting Actress in 1955 for Takekurabe and Ishigassen. In 1995, she received a Special Award from the Chairman of the Japan Academy in honour of her lifetime achievements in cinema.

For her work on stage, she has been awarded at the Agency for Cultural Affairs' Arts Festival three times for the plays Tanuki (1974), Aizome Takao (1977), and Daiyu-san (1983).

She was named a Person of Cultural Merit by the Japanese government in 1993 and became the first actress to receive the Order of Culture in 2000.

== Filmography (selected) ==
=== Film ===
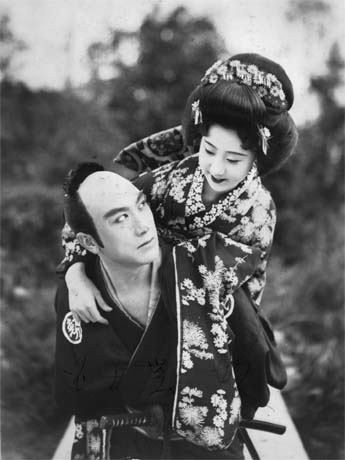
Isuzu with Chiezō Kataoka in 1932

Year	Title	Role	Director
1930	Ken o koete	Okayo	Kunio Watanabe
1934	Aizō Tōge	Utakichi Bando	Kenji Mizoguchi
1935	Orizuru Osen	Osen	Kenji Mizoguchi
1936	Osaka Elegy	Ayako Murai	Kenji Mizoguchi
1936	Sisters of the Gion	Younger sister Omocha	Kenji Mizoguchi
1938	Tsuruhachi and Tsurujiro	Tsuruhachi	Mikio Naruse
1941	Kinō kieta otoko	Kotomi	Masahiro Makino
1943	The Song Lantern	Osode	Mikio Naruse
1946	Aru yo no Tonosama	Omitsu	Teinosuke Kinugasa
1950	A Mother's Love	Mitsuko	Hiroshi Shimizu
1951	Home Sweet Home	Namiko Uemura	Noboru Nakamura
1951	Fireworks over the Sea	Kaoru Uozumi	Keisuke Kinoshita
1952	Gendai-jin	Mrs. Shinako	Minoru Shibuya
1952	Hakone fūunroku	Ritsu	Satsuo Yamamoto
1953	Epitome	Tamiko	Kaneto Shindo
1953	Hiroshima	Mine Oba	Hideo Sekigawa
1954	Tōjin Okichi	Tōjin Okichi	Mitsuo Wakasugi
1955	Takekurabe	Okichi	Heinosuke Gosho
1955	Christ in Bronze	Kimika	Minoru Shibuya
1956	Boshizō	Yukiko Izumi	Kiyoshi Saeki
1956	A Cat, Shozo, and Two Women	Shinako	Shirō Toyoda
1956	Flowing	Tsutaya	Mikio Naruse
1957	Throne of Blood	Lady Asaji Washizu	Akira Kurosawa
1957	Black River	Mikiko	Masaki Kobayashi
1957	Tokyo Twilight	Kikuko	Yasujirō Ozu
1957	The Lower Depths	Osugi	Akira Kurosawa
1961	The Littlest Warrior	Yashio	Taiji Yabushita/Yūgo Serikawa
1961	Yojimbo	Orin	Akira Kurosawa
1961	The Story of Osaka Castle	Yodogimi	Hiroshi Inagaki
1975	Kenji Mizoguchi: The Life of a Film Director	Herself	Kaneto Shindo
1978	Shogun's Samurai	Oeyo	Kinji Fukasaku
1982	Suspicion	Tokie Horiuchi	Yoshitarō Nomura
1984	Hissatsu: Sure Death	Oriku	Masahisa Sadanaga

=== Television ===
Year	Title	Role	Network	Notes
1964	Akō Rōshi	Riku	NHK	Taiga drama
1966	Minamoto no Yoshitsune	Tokiwa Gozen	NHK	Taiga drama
1977–78	Shin Hissatsu Karakurinin	Oen	ABC	Hissatsu series
1978	Hissatsu Karakurinin Fugakuhiyakkei Koroshitabi	Oen	ABC	Hissatsu series
1979–81	Hissatsu Shigotonin	Otowa	ABC	Hissatsu series
1981–82	Shin Hissatsu Shigotonin	Oriku	ABC	Hissatsu series
1982–83	Hissatsu Shigotonin III	Oriku	ABC	Hissatsu series
1983	Ōoku	Yuri (Jōen-in)	CX	
1984	Hissatsu Shigotonin IV	Oriku	ABC	Hissatsu series
1985	Hissatsu Shigotonin V	Oriku	ABC	Hissatsu series
2000	Aoi Tokugawa Sandai	Odai no Kata	NHK	Taiga drama
