= Tōjin Okichi =

Tōjin Okichi may refer to:

- Tōjin Okichi (1930 film), a Japanese silent drama film by Kenji Mizoguchi
- Tōjin Okichi (1954 film), a Japanese drama film by Mitsuo Wakasugi
