= Komako Hara =

Japanese actress (1910–1968)

Komako Hara 原駒子
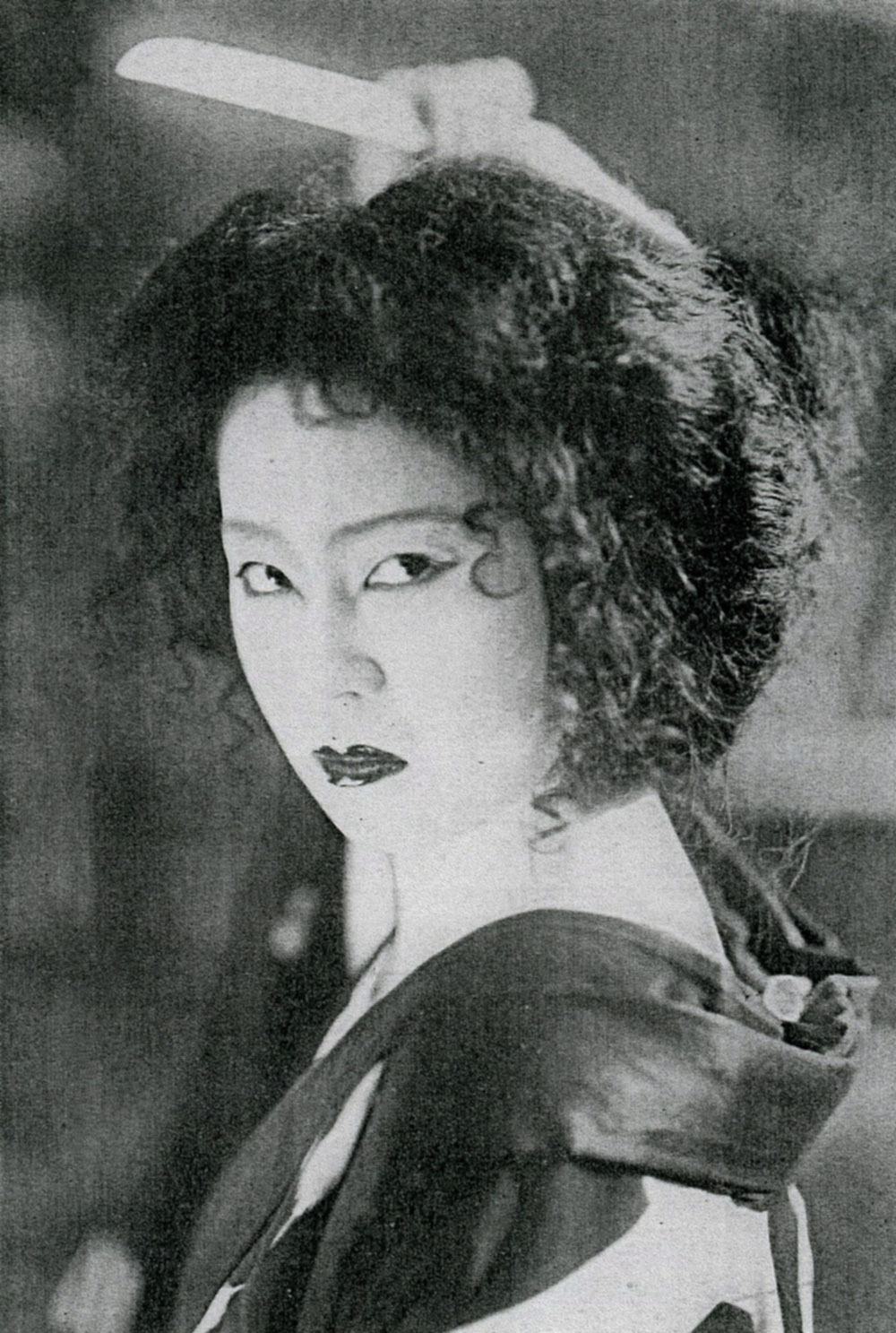
- Komako Hara in Hakuchō himon (1932)
- Born: Komako Kuragata; February 26, 1910; Kanagawa Prefecture
- Died: December 28, 1968 (aged 58)
- Occupation: Film actress

Komako Kuragata (倉形 駒子, Kuragata Komako, 26 February 1910 – 28 December 1968), known professionally as Komako Hara (原 駒子, Hara Komako), was a Japanese film actress who was particularly prominent in the silent era.

== Career ==
Born in Kanagawa Prefecture, Hara made her motion picture debut in 1924 in the film Rakujitsu no yume. At studios such as Tōa Kinema and Makino Talkie, she achieved fame specializing in starring roles playing vamps, dokufu (poison women), and yakuza molls in jidaigeki. In the sound era, she shifted to secondary roles in films by directors such as Kenji Mizoguchi, Masahiro Makino, and Keigo Kimura. She appeared in over 200 films in her career.

== Selected filmography ==
- Rakujitsu no yume (落日の夢) (1924)
- Aishō (愛傷) (1926)
- The Mountain Pass of Love and Hate (愛憎峠 Aizo toge) (1934)
- Maria no Oyuki (マリアのお雪) (1935)
- Onna Sazen (女左膳) (1937)
- Chikemuri Takadanobaba (血煙高田の馬場) (1937)
- The Life of Oharu (西鶴一代女 Saikaku Ichidai Onna) (1952)
