= Kaoru Osanai =

Japanese theater director, playwright, and actor (1881–1928)

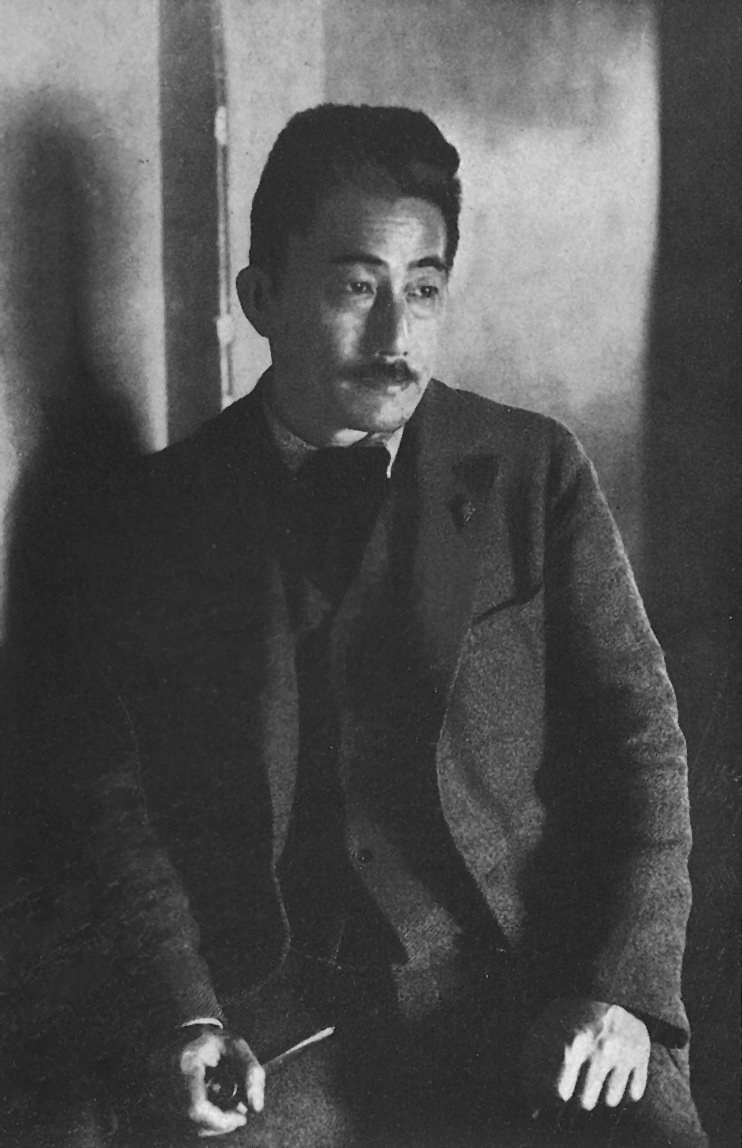
- Kaoru Osanai in 1927
- Born: July 26, 1881; Naka-ku, Hiroshima, Hiroshima, Japan
- Died: December 25, 1928 (aged 47)
- Occupations: Theatre director; playwright; actor

Kaoru Osanai (小山内 薫, Osanai Kaoru; July 26, 1881 – December 25, 1928), was a Japanese theater director, playwright, and actor central in the development of modern Japanese theater.

== Biography ==
Kaoru Osanai was born on July 26, 1881, in Hiroshima, the second son of Director of Hiroshima Army Garrison Hospital, Takeshi Osanai. His father was a former samurai from Hirosaki Domain. When he was five, Takeshi died abruptly at the age of 38, leaving his three children Reiko, Kaoru and Yachiyo to his wife Taka. Osanai subsequently moved to Tokyo where he received his education. The family lived comfortably at Takeshi's mansion where Taka and her female friends practiced music. Osanai studied English literature at Tokyo Imperial University, graduating in 1906.

In 1909, Osanai founded the Free Theater (Jiyū Gekijō) with Ichikawa Sadanji II and staged translations of Ibsen, Chekov, and Gorky, but there he experienced the limits of doing realist theater with kabuki actors. Osanai described these limits as an "existing theatrical poison", for he aimed to extend the boundaries of kabuki as part of the shingeki movement. Osanai was one of the many animators who contributed toward defining the fundamental aspects of shingeki theatre.

His first production with the Free Theater, John Gabriel Borkman, brought Western naturalist and modernist drama which would challenge social conventions. Between December 1912 and August 1913, Osanai traveled throughout Europe to experience modern theater first-hand. He was particularly impressed with the work of the Moscow Art Theatre. After returning to Japan in 1920, he worked as the research director of the Shochiku Cinema before he helped found the Tsukiji Little Theater in 1924 and continued to influence shingeki theater. He also played an important role in film history when he was hired by Shochiku in 1920 to head their actors school. He helped produce and appeared in Souls on the Road, a groundbreaking work in Japanese cinema, and raised such important film talents as Minoru Murata, Kiyohiko Ushihara, Daisuke Itō, Yasujirō Shimazu, and Denmei Suzuki. He also taught at Keio University and helped support such young writers as Jun'ichirō Tanizaki.

The list of plays that were staged in the theatre did not include plays by Kikuchi Kan, Kunio Kishida, and Yūzō Yamamoto.

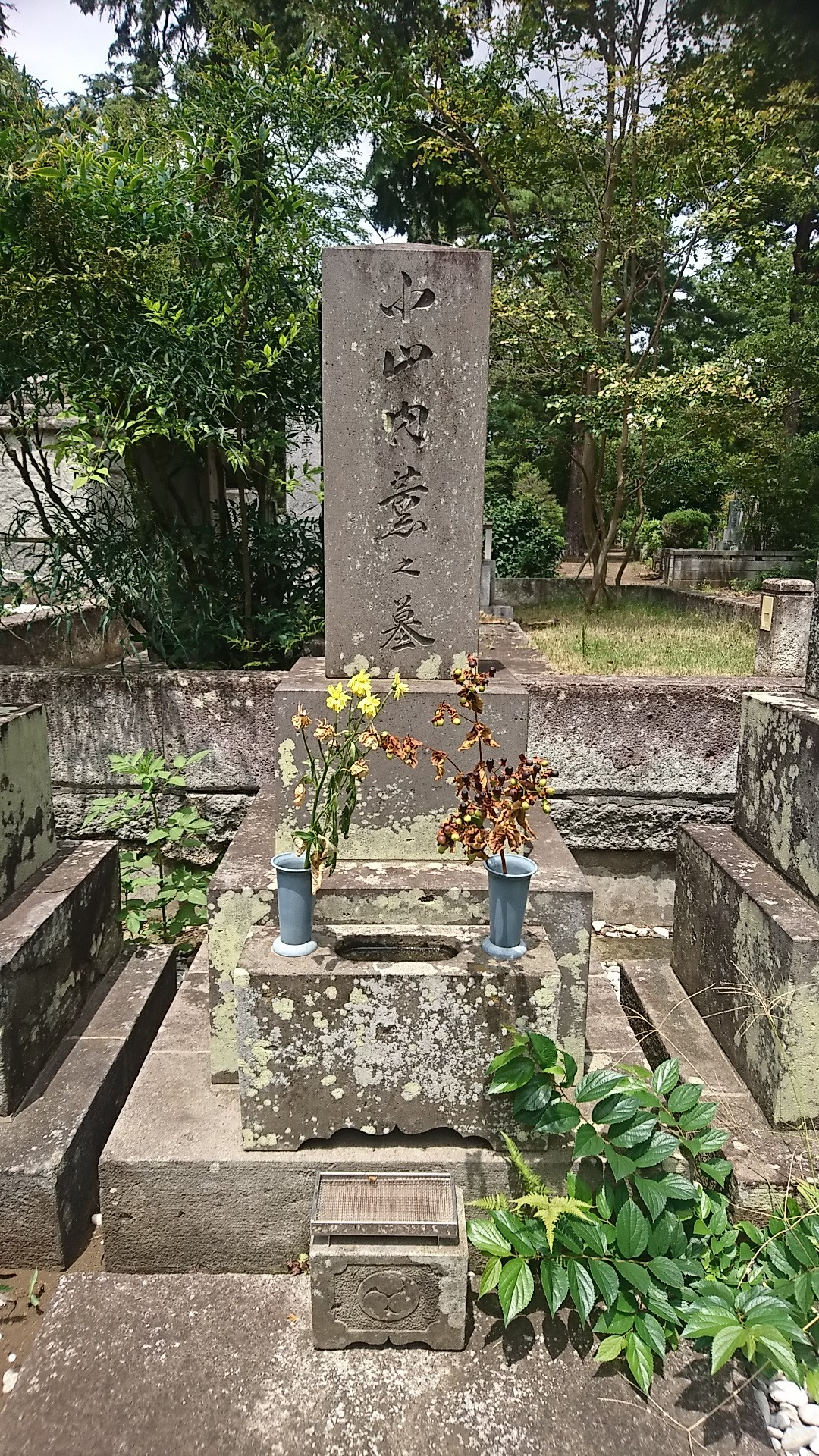
Grave of Kaoru Osanai in Tama Cemetery

On December 25, 1928, Osanai collapsed at a Chinese restaurant in Nihonbashi during a thank-you party held after the performance of Fumiko Enchi's first play Banshun Sōya, and died shortly after returning home. The cause of death was cerebral infarction.
