= Listen to the Voices of the Sea =

1950 Japanese anti-war film

- Film poster
- Directed by: Hideo Sekigawa
- Written by: Kazuo Funahashi
- Produced by: Mitsuo Makino
- Starring: Hajime Izu; Yasumi Hara; Akitake Konō; Kinzō Shin
- Cinematography: Shinkichi Otsuka
- Edited by: Shintaro Miyamoto
- Music by: Akira Ifukube
- Production company: Toyoko Eiga
- Distributed by: Tokyo Film Distribution Company
- Release date: June 15, 1950
- Running time: 109 minutes
- Country: Japan
- Language: Japanese

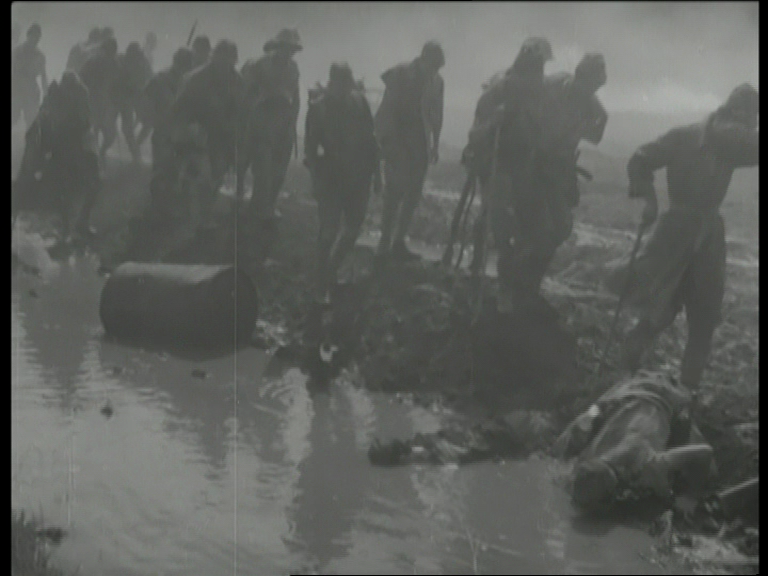
Japanese soldiers in screenshot of Listen to the Voices of the Sea.

Listen to the Voices of the Sea (Japanese: 日本戦歿学生の手記 きけ、わだつみの声, romanized: Nippon senbotsu gakusei no shuki: Kike wadatsumi no koe, lit. 'Notes from Fallen Japanese Student Soldiers: Listen to the Voices from the Sea') is a 1950 Japanese anti-war film directed by Hideo Sekigawa. It is based on the 1949 best-selling book Listen to the Voices from the Sea (Kike wadatsumi no koe), a collection of letters by Japanese student soldiers killed in World War II. The first post-war Japanese film to feature battle scenes, it was a big success with domestic cinema audiences.

== Plot ==
In Burma during the last weeks of World War II, the remnants of a Japanese infantry unit are joined by Private Oki, whose own unit has been destroyed. Oki turns out to be the former University professor of some of the soldiers, many of which are drafted students. He is bullied by the sadistic adjutant of the commander Lieutenant Kishino, himself an uneducated man who dislikes students and academics.

Close to the edge of starvation, a group of soldiers, led by squad leader Aoji, steal and slaughter the Lieutenant's horse. Upon discovery, Aoji is beaten, while the adjutant uses the incident as a pretence to execute Private Kawanishi, who overtly opposes the war.

When the soldiers are sent out to battle against an outnumbering enemy, the wounded are left behind to commit suicide with hand grenades. The rest of the unit is killed in artillery fire. Only Kishino and his adjutant, as the film suggests, manage to escape. The last scene shows the soldiers' souls emerging from their scattered corpses.

== Cast ==
Actor	Role
Hajime Izu	Aoji
Yasumi Hara	Kishino
Akitake Konō	Kawanishi
Kinzō Shin	Oki
Haruko Sugimura	Akiyama's mother
Yuriko Hanabusa	Kawanishi's mother
Yōichi Numata	Maki
Sōji Kamishiro	Shibayama
Kōichi Hayashi	Noomura
Kyōsuke Tsuki	Negishi
Toshio Takahara	combat medic
Kazuo Tokita	Matori
Tokue Hanazawa	Tsuruta
Yoshio Ōmori	Omachi
Shōzō Inagaki	Mita
Tamotsu Kawasaki	Akiyama
Kiichi Sugi	Kimura
Asao Sano	Yamada
Kazuo Masabuchi	Iijima
Shōichi Onjō	Chiba
Tadashi Suganuma	
Jirō Kozaki	
Kieko Sawamura	Yano
Kōichi Fujima	

== Literary background ==
In the flashback sequence showing the last university lecture because of the students' mobilisation, Professor Oki cites extensively from French philosopher and humanist Montaigne's 1580 essay Comme l’ame descharge ses passions sur des objects faux, quand les vrais luy défaillent (How the soul discharges its passions on false objects, when the true ones fail it), describing it as a contemplation on death in times marked by wars. He closes with a quote from Montaigne's essay Que philosopher c'est apprendre à mourir (That to philosophise is to learn to die).

== Home media ==
Listen to the Voices of the Sea was released on DVD in Japan in 2005 and in the Czech Republic in 2009.
