= Kiyohiko Ushihara =

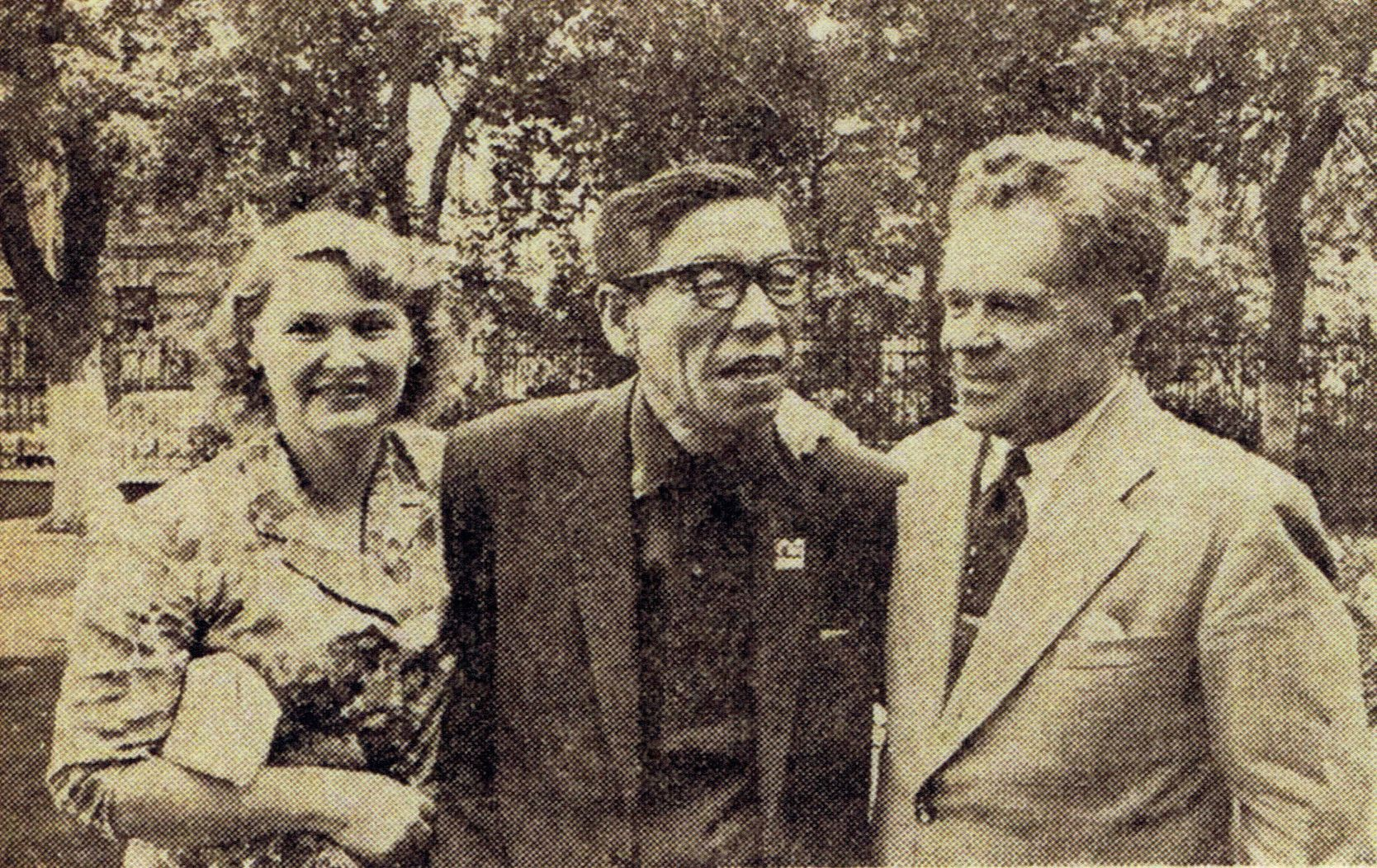
- Mark Semenovich Donskoy (right), Kiyohiko Ushihara (center) and Irina Borisovna Donskaya (left).
- Born: 2 March 1897
- Died: 20 May 1985 (aged 88)
- Occupation: Film director

Kiyohiko Ushihara (牛原 虚彦, Ushihara Kiyohiko; 2 March 1897 – 20 May 1985) was a Japanese film director most famous for his gendaigeki of the silent era.

== Career ==
Born in Kumamoto Prefecture and graduating from Tokyo University, Ushihara joined the Shochiku studio in 1920 on the invitation of Kaoru Osanai. Starting out by helping on the script to Minoru Murata's Gorky-influenced Souls on the Road, he made his directorial debut in 1921 and later directed adaptations of such works as Victor Hugo's Les Misérables under the title Aa mujō. In the mid-1920s he went to America to study Hollywood filmmaking, working under Charlie Chaplin. He returned to film romantic comedies and action films starring Denmei Suzuki and Kinuyo Tanaka such as Shingun. Between 1928 and 1932 he co-edited the journal Eiga kagaku kenkyū (Scientific Studies of Cinema) with Murata. He left Shōchiku in the early 1930s and worked at studios such as Nikkatsu, Shinkō Kinema and Daiei. Quitting directing following the Second World War, he starting to teach filmmaking at institutions such as Nihon University. In 1959, he was a member of the jury at the 1st Moscow International Film Festival. Four years later, he was a member of the jury at the 3rd Moscow International Film Festival. In 1965 he was a member of the jury at the 4th Moscow International Film Festival.

His son, Yōichi Ushihara, is also a film director.

== Selected filmography ==
- Yama kururu (山暮るる The Mountains Grow Dark) (1921)
- Aa mujō (噫無情 Ah, Heartless) (1923)
- Daichi wa hohoemu (大地は微笑む The Smiling Earth) (1925)
- Kare to Tokyo (彼と東京 He and Tokyo) (1928)
- Riku no ōja (陸の王者 A King on Land) (1928)
- Shingun (進軍 Advance) (1930)
- Wakamono yo naze naku ka (若者よなぜ泣くか Why Do You Cry, Youngsters?) (1930)
- The Ghost Cat and the Mysterious Shamisen (妖絃怪猫伝) (1938)
- The Rainbow Man (虹男, 1949)
