= Tsuruhachi and Tsurujiro =

1938 Japanese film

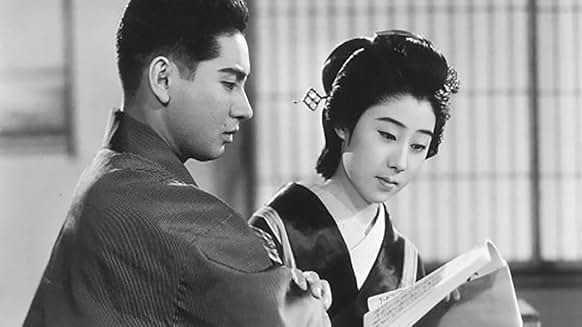

Japanese name
- Kanji: 鶴八鶴次郎
- Directed by: Mikio Naruse
- Written by: Mikio Naruse; Matsutarō Kawaguchi (story)
- Produced by: Nobuyoshi Morita
- Starring: Isuzu Yamada; Kazuo Hasegawa; Kamatari Fujiwara; Heihachiro Okawa; Masao Mishima
- Cinematography: Takeo Itō
- Edited by: Hirokazu Iwashita
- Music by: Nobuo Iida
- Production company: Toho
- Distributed by: Toho
- Release date: 29 September 1938 (Japan)
- Running time: 89 minutes
- Country: Japan
- Language: Japanese

Tsuruhachi and Tsurujiro (鶴八鶴次郎, Tsuruhachi Tsurujirō) is a 1938 Japanese drama film by Mikio Naruse. The film about a duo of traditional music performers is based on a short story (and later shinpa play) by Matsutarō Kawaguchi.

== Plot ==
Tsuruhachi and Tsurujirō, who've known each other since their childhood days, are a successful musical performing duo, with Tsurijirō acting as the tayū (singer), and Tsuruhachi accompanying him on the shamisen. Although both had been taught their art by Tsuruhachi's now deceased mother, he constantly criticises her way of playing, which leads to repeated conflicts that have to be resolved by their manager Shohei and venue owner Takeno.

After Tsuruhachi tells Tsurujirō that she considers marrying wealthy Mr. Matsuzaki, Tsurujirō confesses his love for her, and Tsuruhachi agrees to marry him instead. Tsurujirō hopes to open his own theatre venue one day, so Tsuruhachi offers to help with her inheritance to secure funding. When Tsurujirō learns that the money actually came from Matsuzaki, he accuses Tsuruhachi of being his mistress. Tsuruhachi furiously breaks off the engagement over the false accusation and marries Matsuzaki.

Now appearing solo at small venues across the country, Tsurujirō's career declines, until one day Shohei and Takeno can convince him and his former partner to enter the stage together again. The reunion is a tremendous success, and Tsuruhachi declares that for the opportunity to perform, she would even leave her marriage. On the last evening, Tsurujirō starts criticising Tsuruhachi again, which causes her to break ties with him once and for all. Afterwards, Tsurujirō tells Shohei that he only started the argument with Tsuruhachi so she would return to her marriage, which he thinks is the best thing for her.

== Cast ==
- Isuzu Yamada as Toyo/Tsuruhachi
- Kazuo Hasegawa as Jirō/Tsurujirō
- Kamatari Fujiwara as Shohei
- Heihachiro Okawa as Matsuzaki
- Masao Mishima as Takeno

== Background ==
Tsuruhachi and Tsurujiro was based on Kawaguchi's short story of the same title, which had been awarded the first Naoki Prize in 1935 and was itself said to be an adaptation of the 1934 US film Bolero.

== Release and reception ==
The film premiered in Japan on 29 September 1938. In a critics' discussion in film magazine Kinema Junpo, Tsuruhachi and Tsurujiro was recognised as director Naruse's best film since his 1933 Every-Night Dreams, as was Yamada's performance. At the same time, Naruse was criticised for being vague about the film's historical setting and his inability to put his stamp on the material. Also, the ending was regarded as unsatisfying and unconvincing.

The film was eventually shown in the United States in 1984–85. In a 2006 review for Slant Magazine, critic Keith Uhlich concluded that it was "primarily a vehicle for its very attractive stars", whose visual beauty remained on the surface and whose musical sequences, unlike the director's later The Song Lantern, lacked "the thematic depth of Naruse's best work with the form".

== Legacy ==
Tsuruhachi and Tsurujiro was shown at the Museum of Modern Art in 1985 as part of its retrospective on Mikio Naruse and at the Berlin International Film Festival in 2014 in its "Retrospektive" program.
