= Denmei Suzuki =

Japanese actor

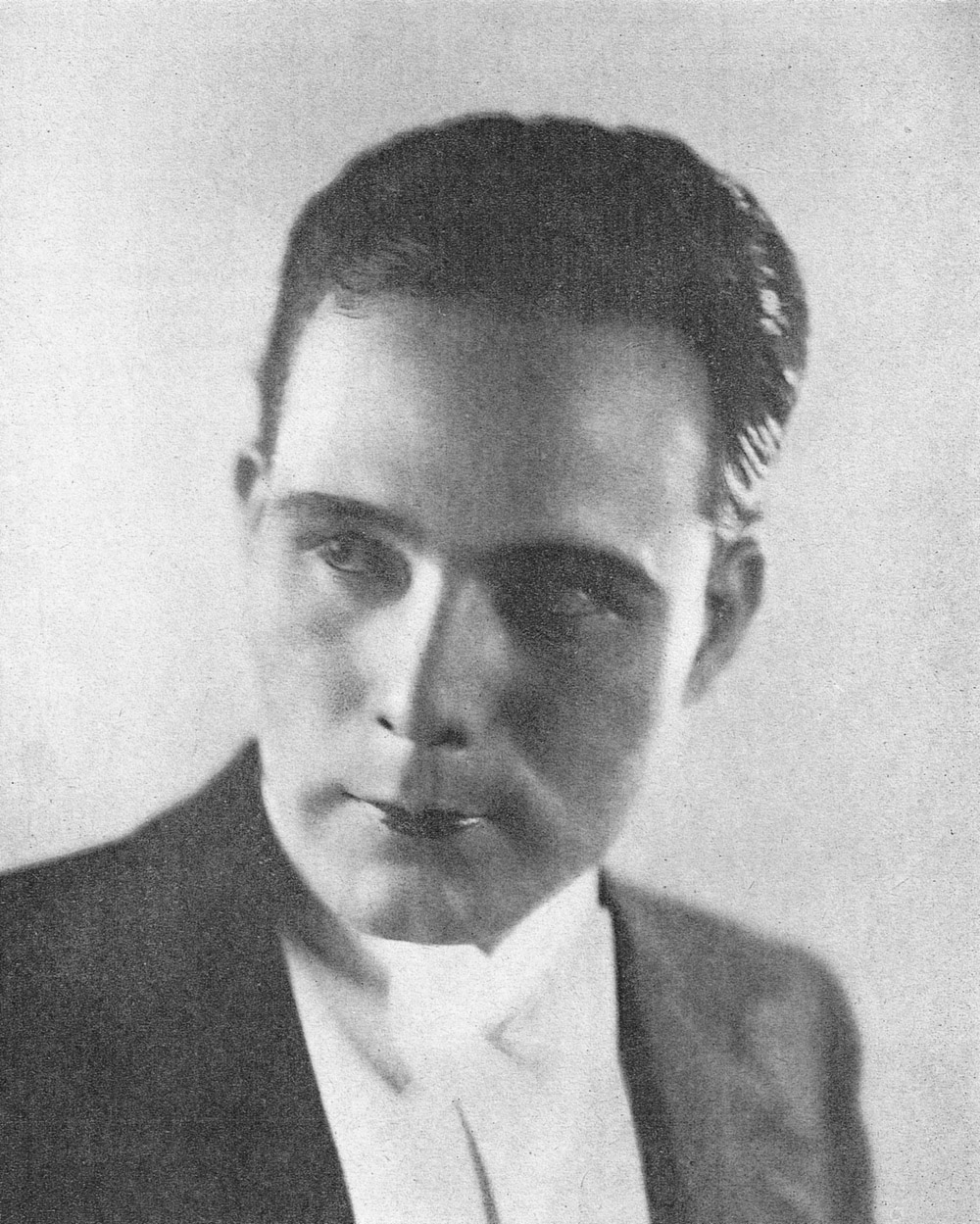
- Denmei Suzuki in 1931
- Born: March 1, 1900; Uenosakuragi, Taitō-ku, Tokyo, Japan
- Died: May 13, 1985 (aged 85)
- Other names: Zeya Tōgō
- Occupation: Film actor

Denmei Suzuki (鈴木 傳明, Suzuki Denmei; 1 March 1900 – 13 May 1985) was a Japanese film actor most famous for starring roles in gendaigeki of the silent era.

== Career ==
Suzuki was born in Tokyo and was a championship swimmer at Meiji University when he first appeared in Souls on the Road in 1921 under the name Zeya Tōgō (東郷是也, a pun on the English "to go there"). After graduating in 1924, he joined the Nikkatsu studio and began acting under his own name. He moved to Shōchiku's Kamata studio the next year and became a major star appearing in youth films often directed by Kiyohiko Ushihara. He also worked with directors such as Kenji Mizoguchi, Minoru Murata, Masahiro Makino, and Yasujirō Shimazu. He appeared in eight films alongside the actress Emiko Yagumo.

He also directed some films and ran for political office, though unsuccessfully.

== Selected filmography ==
- Souls on the Road (路上の霊魂, Rojō no reikon) (1921)
- Marching On (進軍, Shingun) (1930)
- The Mountain Pass of Love and Hate (愛憎峠 Aizo toge) (1934)
- Ahen senso (阿片戦争) (1943)
