= Captive's Island =

1966 Japanese film

- Film Poster
- 処刑の島
- Directed by: Masahiro Shinoda
- Screenplay by: Shintarō Ishihara (screenplay); Taijun Takeda (novel)
- Produced by: Shintarō Ishihara; Akira Yoneyama; Masayuki Nakajima
- Starring: Shima Iwashita; Rentarō Mikuni; Kei Satō; Hosei Komatsu; Taiji Tonoyama
- Cinematography: Tatsuo Suzuki
- Edited by: Masahiro Shinoda
- Music by: Tōru Takemitsu
- Distributed by: Daiei Film
- Release date: 2 July 1966 (Japan)
- Country: Japan
- Language: Japanese

Captive's Island (Japanese: 処刑の島, Hepburn: Shokei no shima; lit. Execution Island), also known as Punishment Island, is a 1966 Japanese drama film directed by Masahiro Shinoda. The screenplay by Shintarō Ishihara was based on the novel Ryujinjima ni nite by Taijun Takeda. The film probes deep into the damaging effects of the Japanese Imperial system on individuals. It concerns the story of a young man who travels to an island to punish the man who had murdered his family and brutalized him twenty years prior, but he develops feelings for the man's daughter which tests his resolve to carry out his revenge. The film makes extensive use of flashbacks, cutting forward and backwards in a free-form multilayered structure, to illustrate how the past casts a shadow over the present.

== Plot ==
A young man in the guise of a salesman travels to an island and asks the ship’s captain, Nomoto, for lodging. This man's name is Saburo, and he was on the island 20 years prior. Saburo's father, Genichiro Nishihara, had been an anarchist, and as a result, Saburo's parents and brother were brutally murdered by Sergeant Otake, a military police officer. The military sent the young Saburo to the island (Shimanagashi) to cover up this atrocity. Saburo didn't know that Otake had also been sent to the same island. Otake, who kept cattle and goats in the island, was given charge of reforming juvenile delinquents and continued to brutalize Saburo. Saburo tried to escape several times, but each time he was beaten to the point of bleeding. His companion Matsui betrayed Saburo, and his teacher Kuroki was a sympathetic but fearful bystander. One day, Saburo is thrown into the sea by Otake and left for dead.

Saburo, who was rescued by a fisherman, has reappeared on the island 20 years later. Matsui is now the president of a construction company. A young woman, Aya, is nearly attacked by three men but Saburo saves her. Aya is Otake's daughter and had met Saburo when she was a little girl. Saburo has feelings for Aya, which complicates his revenge plans.

== Themes & Reception ==
The film explores the effects of violence on both the body and the character’s psyche. Scenes of men beating children and one another are numerous, attacks are carried out with crutches, whips, and live eels, and Shinoda is keen to show this brutality in close ups. Bruised and bloodied bodies contrast sharply with the physical beauty of the island’s greenery and the surrounding ocean. Shinoda also emphasizes violent physicality by muting the soundtrack during some of the most violent moments.

Film scholar Albert Johnson praised the film as one of the best Japanese films of 1966. He praised the evocativeness and beauty of the nature photography and wrote that it was "a dispassionate, moving statement on the nature of evil and the hopelessness of vengeful satisfaction.

== Cast ==
- Akira Nitta as Saburo
- Shima Iwashita as Aya
- Rentarō Mikuni as Otake
- Kei Satō as Matsui
- Hosei Komatsu as Tsuneki
- Taiji Tonoyama as boatman
- Kinzō Shin as Kuroki
