= Souls on the Road =

1921 film

- Directed by: Minoru Murata
- Screenplay by: Kiyohiko Ushihara
- Based on: Children on the Street by Wilhelm Schmidtbonn and on the play The Lower Depths by Maxim Gorky
- Produced by: Kaoru Osanai
- Starring: Kaoru Osanai; Haruko Sawamura; Denmei Suzuki
- Cinematography: Hamataro Oda; Bunjiro Mizutani
- Release date: 8 April 1921 (Japan)
- Running time: 80 minutes
- Country: Japan
- Language: Silent film

Souls on the Road (Japanese: 路上の霊魂, Hepburn: Rojō no Reikon) is a 1921 Japanese silent film directed by Minoru Murata. Film critic Mark Cousins wrote that it was "the first landmark film in Japanese history". The film's plot is adapted from Maxim Gorky's play, The Lower Depths, and Wilhelm Schmidtbonn's drama, Children on the Street.

== Plot ==
Prodigal son Koichiro is introduced midway through his failing career as a violinist in Tokyo. Following a violent incident in which he assaulted a critic, he is expelled from the orchestra and retreats from Tokyo with his wife Yōko and daughter Fumiko. The three determine to return to Koichiro's mountain home to his father.

On the arduous winter journey, two recently liberated convicts Tsurikichi and Kamezo attempt to rob them on the road but when they find out that the family have nothing, they share their bread with the family.

On arriving home, Koichiro is vehemently rejected by his father, despite pleading on behalf of his daughter and the gathering snow storm.

In a nearby villa, Reijo and her guests celebrate Christmas with decorations and Yagibushi dancers. Her butler discovers the escapees trying to break into a store house but takes mercy on them and invites them into the gathering.

Meanwhile, Koichiro and family try to take refuge from the storm in a hay-bale storehouse. Late in the night Koichiro's father comes to remove them from the barn, but discovers his granddaughter has died from the cold. The next day Koichiro is found by Reijo and the woodcutter in the snow, also having frozen to death. The pair wonder whether their lives might have been saved if they had been shown mercy.

The film emphasizes the mercy shown by many characters, including the father Sugino towards the jilted fiancé Mitsuko, the ex-convicts Tsurikichi and Kamezo towards the family, and the butler towards Tsurikichi and Kamezo, in contrast against the stubborn rejection of the father towards his prodigal son.

== Cast ==
- Sugino： Kaoru Osanai
- Sugino's son, Koichiro：Denmei Suzuki
- Koichiro's wife, Yōko：Haruko Sawamura [ja] 澤村春子
- Koichiro's daughter, Fumiko：Mikiko Hisamatsu
- Koichiro's previously betrothed, Mitsuko：Ryuko Date
- Taro, the young woodcutter: Minoru Murata
- Ex-con 1 Tsurikichi：Minami Kōmei
- Ex-con 2 Kamezo: Shigeru Tsutamura
- Reijo of the villa : Yuriko Hanabusa
- Butler of the villa：Kiyohiko Ushihara
- Guard of the villa：Sōtarō Okada [ja] 岡田宗太郎

== Legacy ==
Professor Mitsuyo Wada-Marciano has noted that the performance of Yuriko Hanabusa directly recreates details of Mary Pickford's characters whereas later films such as A Burden of Life depict more subtle referentiality between Hollywood conventions and Japanese daily life.

== See also ==
- Cinema of Japan
