= Roningai =

1928 film

Roningai (Samurai Town: Story 1, Story 2 and Story 3)
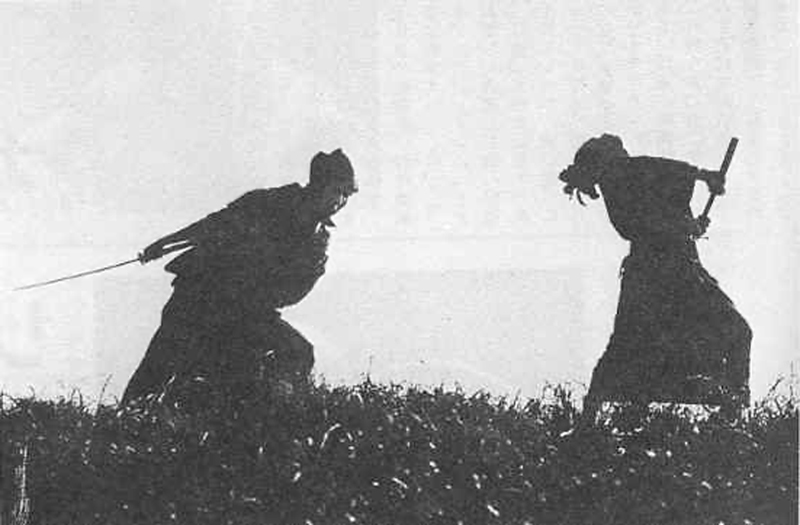
- A dynamic and aesthetic scene of Roningai
- Directed by: Masahiro Makino
- Written by: Itaro Yamagami
- Starring: Komei Minami; Toichiro Negishi; Seizaburo Kawazu; Tsuyako Okajima
- Cinematography: Minoru Miki
- Production company: Makino Film Productions
- Distributed by: Digital Meme (DVD)
- Release dates: 1928 (Story 1); 1929 (Story 2, Story 3)
- Running time: Story 1: 15 reels (original); 8 minutes (DVD); Story 2: 19&7 reels (original); 72 minutes (DVD); Story 3: 15 reels (original); lost
- Country: Japan
- Language: Silent

Roningai (Japanese: 浪人街 第一話、第二話、第三話, Hepburn: Roningai Daiichiwa Dainiwa Daisanwa), also known as Samurai Town: Story 1, Story 2 and Story 3, are respectively 1928 and 1929 black and white Japanese silent films directed by Masahiro Makino. Serving as parts of a 4-part series, the first and second installments are representative films of Masahiro Makino, the son of Shozo Makino (considered the 'father of Japanese film'). The Story 2 consists of two parts - the "first chapter" (第一篇 (Dai-ippen)) and "the solution" (解決篇 (Kaiketsuhen)).

These films lent status to ensemble casts and did not rely on famous stars. The film was known for its depiction of the unique setting of the ronin town as well as for the exquisite camera work and fast-paced sword fighting scenes.

Most of the film of Story 1 was lost, and Story 3 was completely lost. The shortened version of the film of Story 2 exists.

Makino remade this movie in 1939, 1951, 1957, 1990.
