= The Tale of Genji (1951 film) =

Japanese drama film

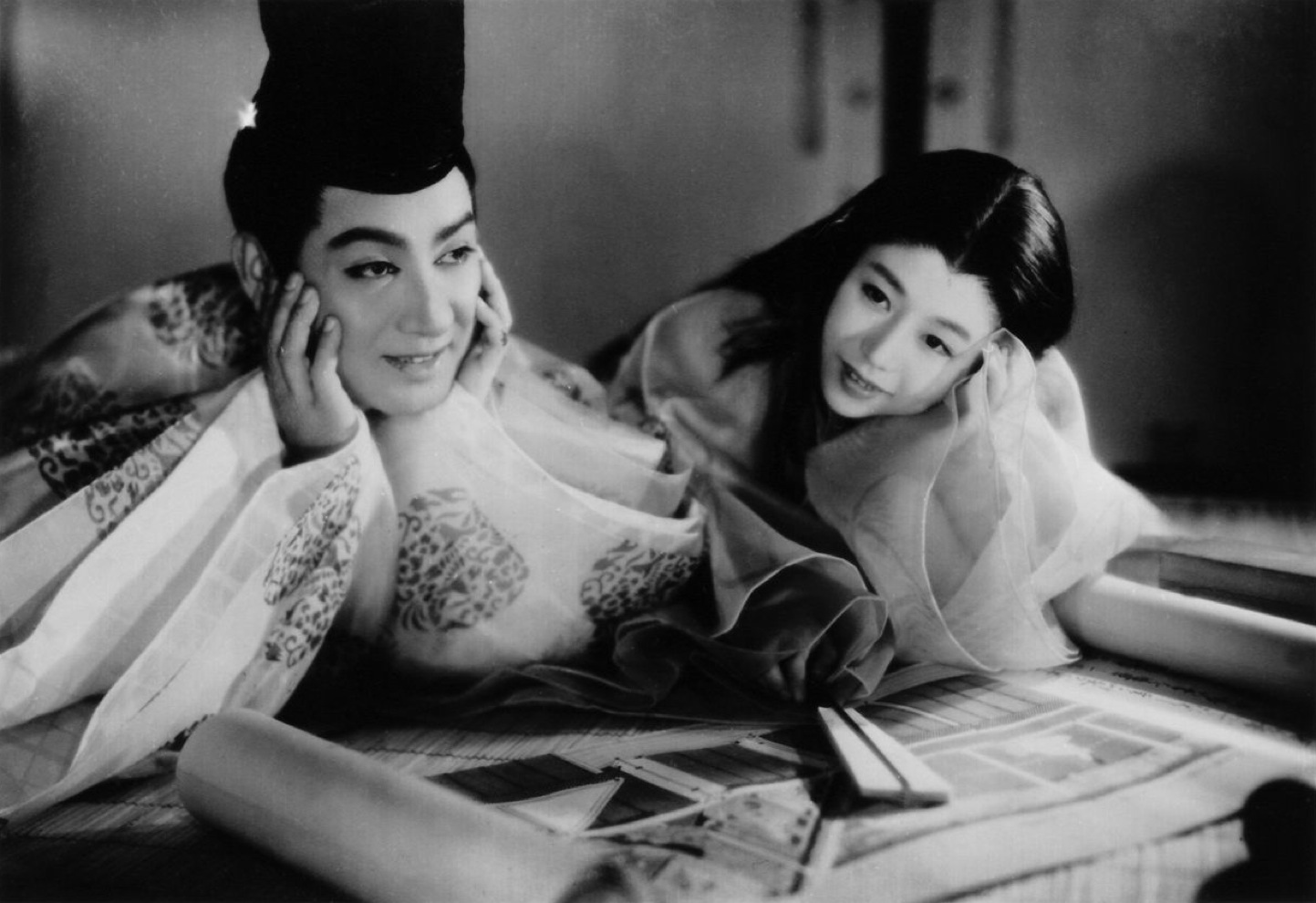
- Directed by: Kōzaburō Yoshimura
- Written by: Kaneto Shindō; Jun'ichirō Tanizaki; Murasaki Shikibu (novel)
- Produced by: Masaichi Nagata
- Starring: Kazuo Hasegawa
- Cinematography: Kōhei Sugiyama
- Music by: Akira Ifukube
- Production company: Daiei Film
- Distributed by: Daiei Film
- Release date: 2 November 1951 (Japan)
- Running time: 124 minutes
- Country: Japan
- Language: Japanese
- Box office: ¥141.05 million (rentals)

The Tale of Genji (源氏物語, Genji Monogatari) is a 1951 Japanese drama film directed by Kōzaburō Yoshimura. It is based on the early 11th century novel of the same name.

== Cast ==
- Kazuo Hasegawa as Hikaru Genji
- Michiyo Kogure as Fujitsubo
- Machiko Kyō as Awaji no ue
- Nobuko Otowa as Murasaki no ue
- Mitsuko Mito as Aoi no ue
- Yuji Hori as Yoshinari
- Denjirō Ōkōchi as Takuma nyudo
- Chieko Soma as Kiritsubo
- Yumiko Hasegawa as Oborozukiyo no kimi
- Chieko Higashiyama as Kobiden
- Osamu Takizawa as Kiritsubo gomon
- Kentaro Honma as Kashira
- Yuriko Hanabusa as Kiritsubo's mother
- Hisako Takihana as Nun
- Taiji Tonoyama as Priest

== Release ==
The Tale of Genji was released in Japan on 2 November 1951 and shown in competition at the 1952 Cannes Film Festival.

== Legacy ==
The Tale of Genji was screened at a 2012 retrospective on Kaneto Shindō and Kōzaburō Yoshimura in London, organised by the British Film Institute and the Japan Foundation.
