= Aizō Tōge =

1934 film by Kenji Mizoguchi

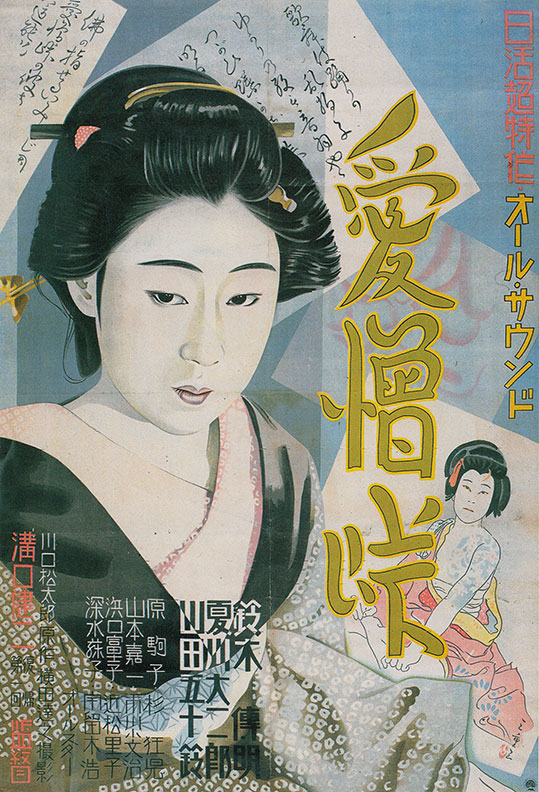
- Original Japanese movie poster
- Directed by: Kenji Mizoguchi
- Written by: Matsutarō Kawaguchi
- Starring: Isuzu Yamada; Daijirō Natsukawa; Denmei Suzuki; Komako Hara
- Cinematography: Tatsuyuki Yokota
- Production company: Nikkatsu
- Release date: 1 September 1934 (Japan)
- Running time: 102 minutes
- Country: Japan
- Language: Japanese

Aizō Tōge (愛憎峠), sometimes referred to in English as The Mountain Pass of Love and Hate, is a 1934 Japanese drama film directed by Kenji Mizoguchi. The screenplay was written by Matsutarō Kawaguchi, based on his own novel. It is considered a lost film.

== Cast ==
- Isuzu Yamada
- Daijirō Natsukawa
- Denmei Suzuki
- Komako Hara

== Background ==
Aizō Tōge was released in Japan on 1 September 1934. The film thematised the Chichibu incident, which Mizoguchi would broach again in his 1949 film Flame of My Love.
