= The Ghost Cat and the Mysterious Shamisen =

1938 Japanese horror film

- Theatrical release poster
- Directed by: Kiyohiko Ushihara
- Written by: Kenji Hata
- Starring: Sumiko Suzuki
- Production company: Shinkō Kinema
- Release date: 1938
- Country: Japan
- Language: Japanese

The Ghost Cat and the Mysterious Shamisen (Japanese: 妖絃怪猫伝(Yōgen Kwaibyō den), Hepburn: Kaibyō nazo no shamisen), or Ghost Cat's Mysterious Shamisen, is a 1938 Japanese horror film directed by Kiyohiko Ushihara. Produced by Shinkō Kinema, it stars Sumiko Suzuki, an actress known for her roles in "ghost cat" films (kaibyō eiga or bake neko mono).

== Premise ==
Mitsue is a popular stage actress and the lover of a shamisen player named Seijuro. She jealously murders two other objects of his affection: Okiyo, a young woman from a samurai family, and Kuro, a cat. The spirits of Okiyo and Kuro then merge into a vengeful ghost.

== Cast ==
- Sumiko Suzuki as Mitsue
- Kinue Utagawa as Okiyo

== Release ==
The Ghost Cat and the Mysterious Shamisen was released in 1938.

In October 2018, the Indiana University Cinema held a 35 mm screening of the film. Two months later the film was also screened at the Metrograph, an independent movie theatre in Manhattan, New York.
