= Akira Ifukube =

Japanese composer (1914–2006)

Akira Ifukube 伊福部 昭
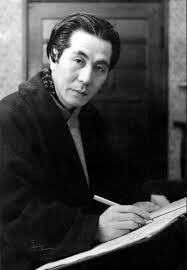
- Ifukube in 1954

Background information
- Born: 31 May 1914; Kushiro, Hokkaido, Empire of Japan
- Died: 8 February 2006 (aged 91) Tokyo, Japan
- Genres: Classical, film scores
- Occupations: Musician, composer, educator
- Years active: 1935-2006
- Spouse: Ai Yuzaki
- Website: akiraifukube.org

Akira Ifukube (伊福部 昭, Ifukube Akira; 31 May 1914 – 8 February 2006) was a Japanese composer. He is best known for composing several entries in the Godzilla franchise as well as developing the titular monster's roar.

== Biography ==
=== Early years in Hokkaido ===
Akira Ifukube was born on 31 May 1914, in Kushiro, Japan as the third son of a police officer Toshimitsu Ifukube. The origins of this family can be traced back to at least the 7th century with the birth of Ifukibe-no-Tokotarihime. He was strongly influenced by the Ainu music as he spent his childhood (from age of 9 to 12) in Otofuke near Obihiro, where was with a mixed population of Ainu and Japanese. His first encounter with classical music occurred when attending secondary school in Sapporo city. Ifukube decided to become a composer at the age of 14 after hearing a radio performance of Igor Stravinsky's The Rite of Spring, and also cited the music of Manuel de Falla as a major influence.

Ifukube studied forestry at Hokkaido Imperial University in Sapporo and composed in his spare time, which prefigured a line of self-taught Japanese composers. His first piece was the piano solo, Piano Suite (later the title was changed to Japan Suite, arranged for orchestra), dedicated to George Copeland who was living in Spain. Atsushi Miura, Ifukube's friend at the university, sent a letter to Copeland. Copeland replied, "It is wonderful that you listen my disc in spite of you living in Japan, the opposite side of the earth. I imagine you may compose music. Send me some piano pieces." Then Miura, who was not a composer, presented Ifukube and this piece to Copeland. Copeland promised to interpret it, but the correspondence was unfortunately stopped because of the Spanish Civil War. Ifukube's big break came in 1935, when his first orchestral piece Japanese Rhapsody won the first prize in a competition for Japanese composers promoted by Alexander Tcherepnin. The judges of that contest – Albert Roussel, Jacques Ibert, Arthur Honegger, Alexandre Tansman, Tibor Harsányi, Pierre-Octave Ferroud, and Henri Gil-Marchex – were unanimous in their selection of Ifukube as the winner. Ifukube studied modern Western composition while Tcherepnin was visiting Japan, and his Piano Suite received an honourable mention at the I.C.S.M. festival in Venice in 1938. Japanese Rhapsody was performed in Europe on a number of occasions in the late 1930s.

On completing University, he worked as a forestry officer and lumber processor in Akkeshi, and towards the end of the Second World War was appointed by the Imperial Japanese Army to study the elasticity and vibratory strength of wood. He suffered radiation exposure after carrying out x-rays without protection, a consequence of the wartime lead shortage. Thus, he had to abandon forestry work and became a professional composer and teacher. Ifukube spent some time in hospital due to the radiation exposure, and was startled one day to hear one of his own marches being played over the radio when General Douglas MacArthur arrived to formalize the Japanese surrender.

=== From 1946 to 2006 in Tokyo ===
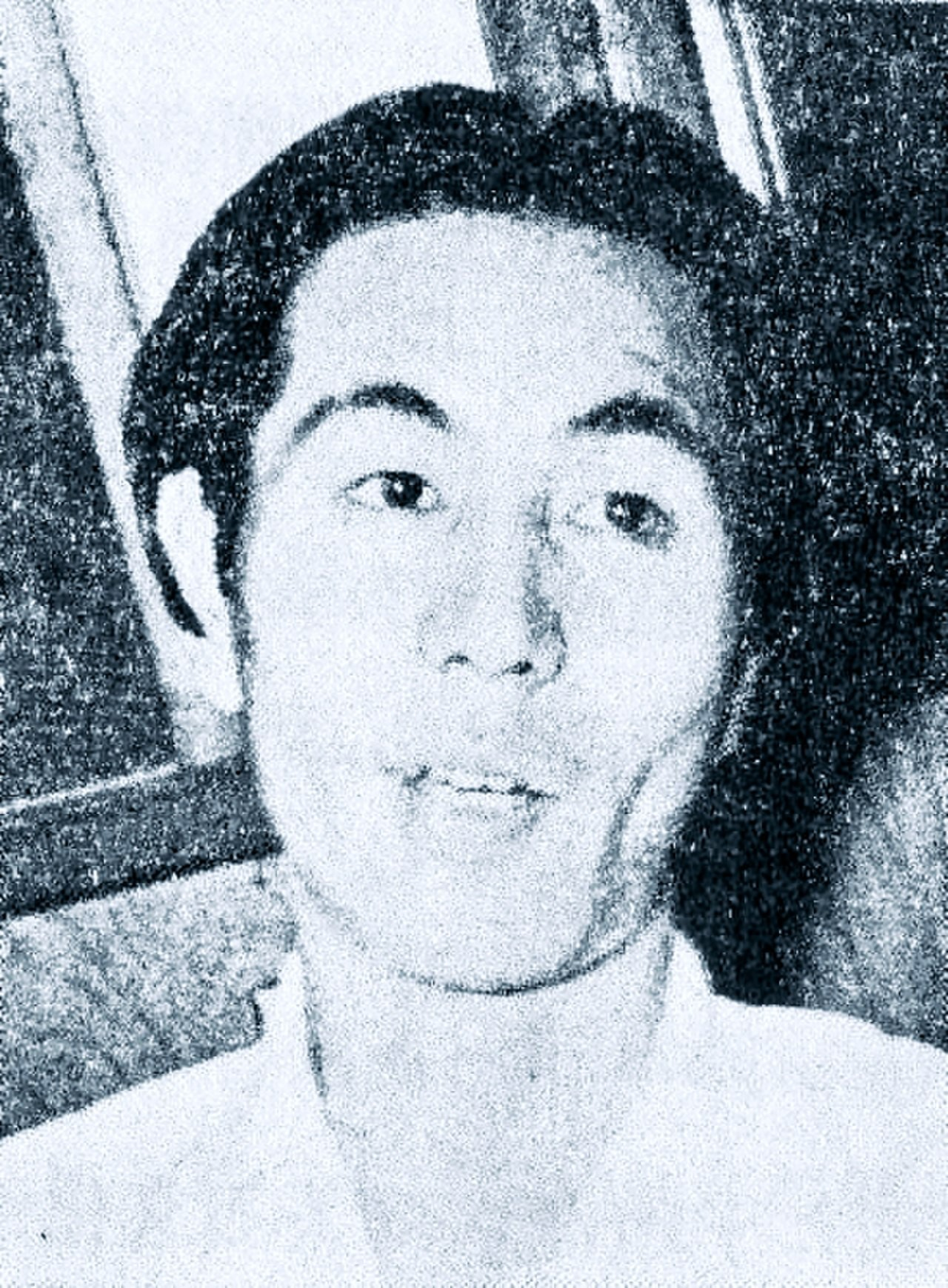
Ifukube in 1956

He taught at the Tokyo University of the Arts (formerly Tokyo Music School), during which period he composed his first film score for Snow Trail, released in 1947. Over the next fifty years, he would compose more than 250 film scores, the high point of which was his 1954 music for Ishirō Honda's Toho movie, Godzilla. Ifukube also created Godzilla's trademark roar – produced by rubbing a resin-covered leather glove along the loosened strings of a double bass – and its footsteps, created by striking an amplifier box.

Despite his financial success as a film composer, Ifukube's first love had always been his general classical work as a composer. In fact his compositions for the two genres cross-fertilized each other. For example, he was to recycle his 1953 music for the ballet Shaka, about how the young Siddhartha Gautama eventually became the Buddha, for Kenji Misumi's 1961 film Buddha. Then in 1988 he reworked the film music to create his three-movement symphonic ode Gotama the Buddha. Meanwhile, he had returned to teaching at the Tokyo College of Music, becoming president of the college the following year, and in 1987 retired to become head of the College's ethnomusicology department.

He trained younger generation composers such as Toshiro Mayuzumi, Yasushi Akutagawa, Akio Yashiro, Teizo Matsumura, Sei Ikeno, Minoru Miki, Maki Ishii, Riichirō Manabe, Hajime Okumura, Reiko Arima, Taichiro Kosugi, Kaoru Wada, Motoji Ishimaru, Shigeyuki Imai, and Satoshi Imai. See: List of music students by teacher: G to J#Akira Ifukube. He also published Orchestration, a 1,000-page book on theory, widely used among Japanese composers.

He died in Tokyo at Meguro-ku Hospital of multiple organ dysfunction on 8 February in 2006, at the age of 91 and buried at the Ube shrine in Tottori.

=== Honors ===
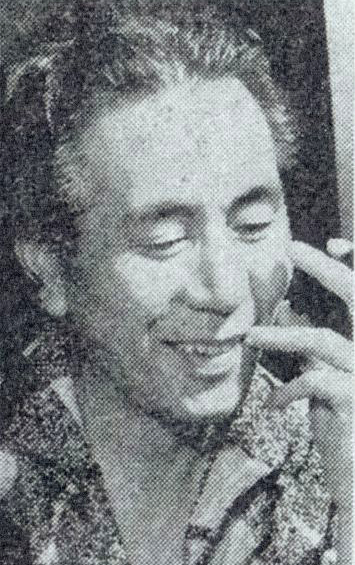
Ifukube in 1960

The Japanese government awarded Ifukube the Order of Culture. Subsequently, he was awarded the Order of the Sacred Treasure, Third Class.

=== Tribute ===
On May 31, 2021, Google celebrated the 107th anniversary of his birth with a Google Doodle.

== Works ==
=== Orchestral/chamber ===
- Japanese Rhapsody (1935)
- Triptyque Aborigène: trois tableaux pour orchestre de chambre (1937); dedicated to Alexander Tcherepnin.
- Ballet symphonique après Etenraku (1940)
- Symphony Concertante for piano and orchestra (1941)
- Ballata Sinfonica (1943)
- Overture to the Nation of Philippines (1944)
- Arctic Forest (1944)
- Rapsodia Concertante for violin and orchestra (Violin Concerto No. 1) (1948, revised 1951/59/71)
- Salome, ballet (1948, score revised and expanded 1987 for Suite) based on Oscar Wilde's play
- Fire of Prometheus, ballet (1950)
- Drumming of Japan, ballet (1951, revised 1984)
- Sinfonia Tapkaara (1954, revised 1979)
- Ritmica Ostinata for piano and orchestra (1961, revised 1971)
- Ronde in Burlesque for wind orchestra (1972, arranged to orchestra in 1983)
- Violin Concerto No. 2 (1978)
- Lauda concertata for marimba and orchestra (1979)
- Eglogue symphonique for 20-strings koto and orchestra (1982)
- Symphonic Fantasia No. 1 (1983); arrangement from the film scores
- Symphonic Fantasia No. 2 (1983); arrangement from the film scores
- Symphonic Fantasia No. 3 (1983); arrangement from the film scores
- Gotama the Buddha, symphonic ode for mixed chorus and orchestra (1989)
- Japanese Suite for orchestra (1991); arrangement from the piano suite
- Japanese Suite for string orchestra (1998); arrangement from the piano suite

=== Instrumental ===
- Piano Suite (1933)
- Toka: Cantilena ballabile sul mode antico de Giappone, for guitar (1967)
- Kugoka for guitar (1969)
- Toccata for guitar (1970)
- Fantasia for baroque lute (1980)
- Sonata for violin and piano (1985)
- Ballata sinfonica for duo-treble and bass 25-stringed koto (2001)

=== Vocal ===
- Ancient Minstrelsies of Gilyak Tribes, for soprano and piano (1946)
- Three Lullabies among the Native Tribes on the Island of Sakhalin, for soprano and piano (1949)
- Eclogues after Epos among Aino Races, for soprano and timpani (1950)
- A Shanty of the Shiretoko Peninsula (1961)
- The Sea of Okhotsk for soprano, bassoon, piano (or harp) and double bass (1988)
- Tomo no oto for traditional ensemble and orchestra (1990)
- Lake Kimtaankamuito (Lake Mashū) (摩周湖, Mashū-ko) for soprano, viola and harp or piano (1992)
- Five Poems after Inaba Manyo (1994); text by Ōtomo no Yakamochi
- La Fontaine sacrée for soprano, viola, bassoon and harp (1964, 2000); arrangement by the composer from the 1964 film score Mothra vs. Godzilla
- Ao Saghi (Grey heron) for soprano, oboe, double bass and piano (2000); text by Genzō Sarashina

=== Film scores ===
Year	Title	Director(s)	Notes
1947	Snow Trail	Senkichi Taniguchi	
1947	Kôfuku eno shôtai	Yasuki Chiba	
1947	Meitantei Hiroshi kun	Hideo Sekigawa	Short film
1948	Daini no jinsei	Hideo Sekigawa	
1948	Kuro-uma no danshichi	Hiroshi Inagaki	
1948	Woman In the Typhoon Belt		
1948	The President and a Female Clerk		
1949	The Quiet Duel	Akira Kurosawa	
1949	Late Night Confession		
1949	Jakoman and Tetsu		
1949	Rainbow Man		
1949	Detective Hiroshi		
1950	City of the Spider		
1950	White Beast		
1950	Listen to the Student's Memoirs Senbotsu Japan, Voice of Wadatsumi		
1950	Flowers of Seven Colors		
1951	Beyond Love and Hate		
1951	Clothes of Deception		
1951	Free School		
1951	The Tale of Genji	Kōzaburō Yoshimura	
1952	Children of Hiroshima	Kaneto Shindo	
1952	Violence		
1952	Swift Current		
1952	Tenryu River		
1953	A Thousand Paper Cranes		
1953	Epitome		
1953	Anatahan	Josef von Sternberg	
1953	White Fish		
1953	Crab Ship		
1953	Hiroshima	Hideo Sekigawa	
1954	Sakuma Dam Part One		
1954	Cape Ashizuri		
1954	Muddy Youth		
1954	Godzilla	Ishiro Honda	
1954	Dobu	Kaneto Shindo	
1955	Ningen Gyorai Kaiten	Shūe Matsubayashi	
1955	Women of Ginza		
1955	The Maid's Kid	Tomotaka Tasaka	
1955	Sakuma Dam Part Two: Transformation of the Great Tenryu		
1955	Three Faces		
1955	Kabuki Jūhachiban Narukami: Beauty and the Sea Dragon		
1955	Baruuba		
1956	The Burmese Harp	Kon Ichikawa	
1956	Wandering Shore		
1956	Onibi		
1956	Sound of the Fog		
1956	The Good Natured Couple		
1956	Godzilla, King of the Monsters!	Terry O. Morse; Ishirō Honda	American version
1956	Rodan	Ishirō Honda	
1957	Osaka Story		
1957	Advancing Vitamin B1		
1957	Yagyu Secret Scrolls		
1957	Sakuma Dam Part Three		
1957	Hateful Things		
1957	Who Committed Murder		
1957	The Final Escape		
1957	Bastards of the Sea		
1957	Downtown		
1957	The Ground		
1957	The Mysterians	Ishirō Honda	
1958	Yagyu Secret Scrolls: Ninjitsu		
1958	Sorrow Is Only for Women		
1958	A Bridge for Us Alone		
1958	Ice Wall		
1958	Varan the Unbelievable	Ishirō Honda	Japanese version
1959	Boss of the Underworld		
1959	Whistling in the Kotan		
1959	Woman and the Pirates		
1959	Tear Down Those Walls	Kō Nakahira	
1959	The Three Treasures	Hiroshi Inagaki	
1959	Battle in Outer Space	Ishirō Honda	
1960	Baluchaung Project		
1960	Shinran		
1960	Shinran Continued		
1960	Castle of Flames		
1961	The Story of Osaka Castle	Hiroshi Inagaki	
1961	Musashi Miyamoto		
1961	Challenge in the Snow		
1961	Buddha		
1961	Hangyakuji		
1961	Different Sons		
1962	The Tale of Zatoichi	Kenji Misumi	
1962	The Whale God	Tokuzō Tanaka	
1962	King Kong vs. Godzilla	Ishirō Honda	Japanese version (Note: The 1963 American version of the film replaced Ifukube's music with public domain stock music. However, the Faro natives chant music was retained for the American version.)
1962	The Great Wall		
1962	Chūshingura: Hana no Maki, Yuki no Maki	Hiroshi Inagaki	
1963	The New Tale of Zatoichi	Tokuzō Tanaka	
1963	The Little Prince and the Eight-Headed Dragon	Yūgo Serikawa	
1963	13 Assassins	Eiichi Kudo	
1963	Zatoichi the Fugitive	Tokuzō Tanaka	
1963	Yoso		
1963	Zatoichi on the Road	Kimiyoshi Yasuda	
1963	Atragon	Ishirō Honda	
1964	Teikoku Bank Incident: Prisoner of Death Row		
1964	Mothra vs. Godzilla	Ishirō Honda	
1964	Dogora	Ishirō Honda	
1964	Fight, Zatoichi, Fight	Kenji Misumi	
1964	The Last Woman of Shang		
1964	The Woman Running on the Shore		
1964	Suruga yukyoden		
1964	Ghidorah, the Three-Headed Monster	Ishirō Honda	
1964	Whirlwind		
1965	Tokugawa Ieyasu		
1965	Zatoichi's Revenge	Akira Inoue	
1965	Japanese Archipelago		
1965	Frankenstein vs. Baragon	Ishirō Honda	
1965	Invasion of Astro-Monster	Ishirō Honda	
1965	Zatoichi and the Chess Expert	Kenji Misumi	
1966	Daimajin	Kimiyoshi Yasuda	
1966	Adventure in Kigan Castle	Senkichi Taniguchi	
1966	Zatoichi's Vengeance	Tokuzō Tanaka	
1966	The War of the Gargantuas	Ishirō Honda	
1966	Return of Daimajin	Kenji Misumi	
1966	Thirteen Thousand Suspects		
1966	Daimajin Strikes Again	Kazuo Mori	
1967	King Kong Escapes	Ishirō Honda	
1967	Eleven Samurai	Eiichi Kudo	
1967	Zatoichi Challenged	Kenji Misumi	
1968	The Snow Woman	Tokuzō Tanaka	
1968	Destroy All Monsters	Ishirō Honda	
1968	Young Challengers	Yasuki Chiba	
1969	Dawn of the Skyscraper		
1969	The Devil's Temple		
1969	Latitude Zero	Ishirō Honda	
1970	Zatoichi Meets Yojimbo	Kihachi Okamoto	
1970	Space Amoeba	Ishirō Honda	
1970	Will to Conquer		
1972	Godzilla vs. Gigan	Jun Fukuda	Stock music
1973	Zatoichi's Conspiracy		
1973	The Human Revolution		
1974	The Last Samurai	Kenji Misumi	
1974	Sandakan No. 8	Kei Kumai	
1975	Terror of Mechagodzilla	Ishirō Honda	
1975	The Door Has Opened		
1976	The Great Elm		
1977	The Sea, the Wings and Tomorrow		
1978	Ogin-sama	Kei Kumai	
1991	Dozoku no ranjo		
1991	Godzilla vs. King Ghidorah	Kazuki Ōmori	
1992	Godzilla vs. Mothra	Takao Okawara	
1993	Godzilla vs. Mechagodzilla II	Takao Okawara	
1993	Kushiro Marshland		
1994	Godzilla vs. Spacegodzilla	Kensho Yamashita	Stock music
1995	Godzilla vs. Destoroyah	Takao Okawara	
1999	Godzilla 2000	Takao Okawara	Stock music
2000	Godzilla vs. Megaguirus	Masaaki Tezuka	Stock music
2001	Godzilla, Mothra and King Ghidorah: Giant Monsters All-Out Attack	Shusuke Kaneko	Stock music
2004	Godzilla: Final Wars	Ryuhei Kitamura	Stock music
2007	Tetsujin 28-gô: Hakuchû no zangetsu	Yasuhiro Imagawa	Posthumous score
2016	Shin Godzilla	Hideaki Anno; Shinji Higuchi	Stock music
2019	Godzilla King of the Monsters	Michael Dougherty	Original themes
2023	Godzilla Minus One	Takashi Yamazaki	Original themes

== Awards and honours ==
Ifukube obtained the Medal with Purple Ribbon in 1980, the 3rd class Order of the Sacred Treasure in 1987, and was honoured as a Person of Cultural Merit in 2003.
