= Kinzō Shin =

Japanese actor (1910–1988)

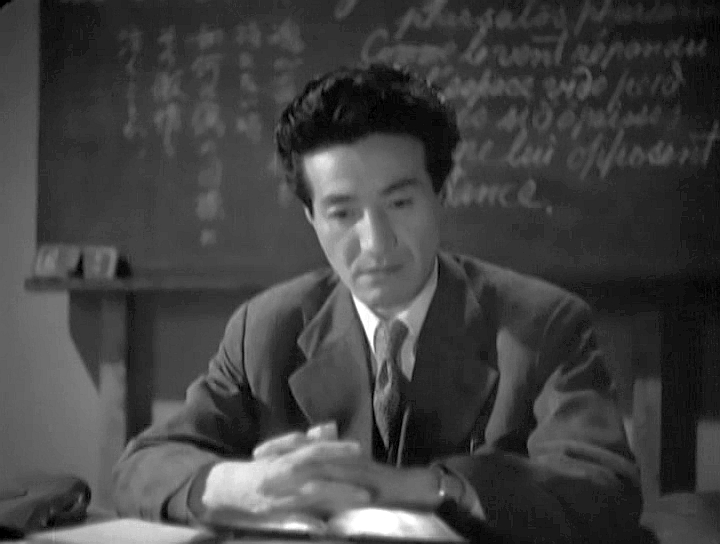
- Kinzō Shin in Listen to the Voices of the Sea
- Born: 9 July 1910; Tokyo, Japan
- Died: 26 December 1988 (aged 78)
- Occupation: Actor
- Spouse: Ranko Akagi

Kinzō Shin (信欣三, Shin Kinzō; 9 July 1910 – 26 December 1988) was a Japanese stage and film actor. Between the early 1930s and late 1980s, he appeared in over 80 films by directors such as Masaki Kobayashi, Kon Ichikawa, Kaneto Shindō, Tadashi Imai and Yasuzō Masumura.

== Biography ==
Kinzō Shin was born in Tokyo. After graduating from Tokyo Prefectural First Commercial School (now Tokyo Metropolitan Daiichi Commercial High School), he first joined the Toho Sayoku Gekijo before becoming a co-founder of the Shinkyo Gekidan, both left-wing theatre groups. Following the forced dissolution of the Shinkyo Gekidan by the authorities, he formed the Mizuho Gekidan company together with Jūkichi Uno and others. After World War II, he was active in the Mingei Theatre Company and the Haiyuza Theatre Company.

After sporadic film appearances in the 1930s, he frequently acted in films since the late 1940s and on television starting in the mid-1950s.

== Filmography (selected) ==
- 1950: Listen to the Voices of the Sea, dir. Hideo Sekigawa
- 1953: Hiroshima, dir. Hideo Sekigawa
- 1953: Tower of Lilies, dir. Tadashi Imai
- 1953: The Thick-Walled Room, dir. Masaki Kobayashi (released 1956)
- 1954: Dobu, dir. Kaneto Shindō
- 1955: Princess Yang Kwei Fei, dir. Kenji Mizoguchi
- 1955: Wolf, dir. Kaneto Shindō
- 1957: Tokyo Twilight, dir. Yasujirō Ozu
- 1957: The Blue Sky Maiden, dir. Yasuzō Masumura
- 1958: Giants and Toys, dir. Yasuzō Masumura
- 1958: Conflagration, dir. Kon Ichikawa
- 1963: Youth of the Beast, dir. Seijun Suzuki
- 1964: Revenge, dir. Tadashi Imai
- 1964: The Long Death, dir. Kei Kumai (starring role as Sadamichi Hirasawa)
- 1966: Captive's Island, dir. Masahiro Shinoda
- 1967: Clouds at Sunset, dir. Masahiro Shinoda
- 1968: The Man Without a Map, dir. Hiroshi Teshigahara
- 1974: Castle of Sand, dir. Yoshitarō Nomura
- 1981: Willful Murder, dir. Kei Kumai
