= Ahen senso =

Ahen Sensō
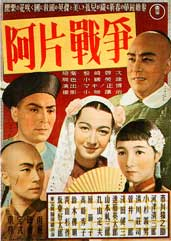
- Japanese film poster
- Kanji: 阿片戦爭
- Revised Hepburn: Ahen Sensō
- Directed by: Masahiro Makino
- Written by: Hideo Oguni; Akira Kurosawa (uncredited)
- Produced by: Toho
- Starring: Ennosuke Ichikawa; Setsuko Hara; Hideko Takamine; Sugisaku Aoyama
- Cinematography: Jōji Obara; Eiji Tsuburaya (Special Effects)
- Music by: Ryoichi Hattori
- Release date: January 14, 1943 (Japan)
- Running time: 115 minutes
- Country: Japan
- Language: Japanese

Ahen senso (阿片戦爭) (or 阿片戰争) aka The Opium War is a 1943 black-and-white Japanese film directed by Masahiro Makino.

"Ahen senso" in Japan refers to the First Opium War. The story of the film concerns this war.

== Cast ==
Actor	Role
Ennosuke Ichikawa	Lin Zexu
Setsuko Hara	Ai Lang
Hideko Takamine	Rei Lang
Sugisaku Aoyama	Charles Elliot
Denmei Suzuki	George Elliot

== Bibliography ==
- Desser, David (1995). "From the Opium War to the Pacific War: Japanese Propaganda Films of World War II". Film History (7): 32–48.
- Washitani, Hana. "The Opium War and the cinema wars: a Hollywood in the greater East Asian co-prosperity sphere." Inter-Asia Cultural Studies 4.1 (2003). pp. 63–76.
