= Hiroshima (1953 film) =

1953 film by Hideo Sekigawa

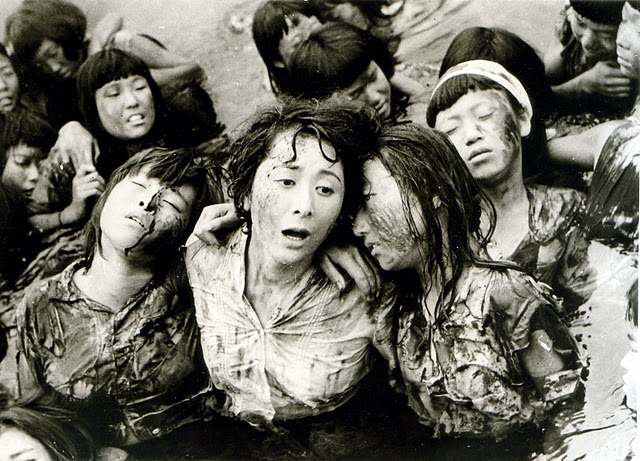
- Yumeji Tsukioka in Hiroshima
- Directed by: Hideo Sekigawa
- Screenplay by: Yasutarō Yagi
- Based on: Children Of The A Bomb: Testament Of The Boys And Girls Of Hiroshima; by Arata Osada
- Produced by: Takeo Ito
- Starring: Yumeji Tsukioka; Eiji Okada; Yoshi Katō; Isuzu Yamada
- Cinematography: Yoshio Miyajima
- Edited by: Akikazu Kono
- Music by: Akira Ifukube
- Production company: Japan Teachers' Union Production
- Distributed by: Hokusei
- Release date: 7 October 1953 (Japan)
- Running time: 109 minutes
- Country: Japan
- Language: Japanese

Hiroshima (ひろしま) is a 1953 Japanese docudrama film directed by Hideo Sekigawa about the atomic bombing of Hiroshima and its impact on a group of teachers, their students, and their families. The film was based on the eye-witness accounts of the hibakusha children compiled by Dr. Arata Osada for the 1951 best-selling book Children Of The A Bomb: Testament Of The Boys And Girls Of Hiroshima (原爆の子, Genbaku no ko), and was filmed with the support of tens of thousands of Hiroshima residents.

Produced with the backing of the Japan Teachers' Union, which had also produced the 1952 film Children of Hiroshima, the film's "anti-American" stance and content prevented it from gaining a wide release in Japan.

== Summary ==
Mr. Kitagawa and his students listen to a radio documentary on the atomic bombing of Hiroshima from the perspective of the pilot on the Enola Gay. Michiko cries out for him to stop the broadcast and her nose begins to bleed. She and a third of the class are hibakusha and suffer from leukemia, referred to as "A-bomb disease". Kitagawa sees students pass around a book containing letters from youths in East and West Germany, and later finds them by Michiko's bedside reading that the Japanese were used as "guinea pigs" to test the nuclear bomb because of their race.

A flashback sequence depicts Hiroshima before and after the bombing, focusing on a class of boys, a class of girls, and a mother and her three children. A meeting of military officers overlooking Hiroshima concludes that they must crack down on rumors about the bomb and keep morale high. In a meeting with university professors, officers accept the existence of the bomb but refuse to consider any negotiation. Endo and his sister return to Hiroshima from the countryside and find their house destroyed. A neighbor tells them their mother and brother were killed, and takes them to see their father in hospital, but Yukio's sister runs away in fear and is not seen again. Endo joins a group of street children who beg G.I.s for food.

In the present, Michiko has succumbed to leukemia and Endo is discharged from reformatory orphanage to work at the same factory as his uncle, but he quits and works at a cabaret to make ends meet. He comes across a group of street children at Hiroshima Peace Park trying to sell bomb-scorched souvenirs to visitors, and tells them where they can find souvenirs that could sell to foreign soldiers. Endo takes the children to unearth the skeletons of bomb victims buried in a cave, leading to his arrest. He is confronted by Kitagawa, and admits that he quit his job at the factory after it switched to manufacturing artillery shells, realizing that if war broke out again, he would be among those who would be forced to fight and that more atomic attacks would take place.

== Cast ==
- Eiji Okada as Kitagawa
- Yumeji Tsukioka as Yonehara
- Yoshi Katō as Hideo Endo
- Isuzu Yamada as Mine Oba
- Shizue Kawarazaki as Yoshiko Endo
- Yasumi Hara as Ito
- Isako Machida as Michiko Oba
- Takashi Kanda as Senda
- Kenji Susukida as Dr. Nishina
- Masao Mishima as Doctor
- Masaya Tsukida as Yukio Endo
- Kinzō Shin as Professor Asakawa

== Production ==
After the end of Allied occupation of Japan, the Japan Teachers' Union (JTU) commissioned an adaptation of Children of the A-Bomb, a well-known book of testimonies of hibakusha children. The union had formed in part due to the collective guilt of teachers for their part in wartime militarism, and was keen to address the subject of the atomic bombings in cinema. The resulting film, Children of Hiroshima, directed by Kaneto Shindō, was relatively successful in Japan and premiered internationally at the 1953 Cannes Film Festival. However, JTU was unhappy with the film, claiming that Shindō had "made [the story] into a tear-jerker and destroyed its political orientation," underplaying both the brutality of the atomic bomb and the political climate of the time, with the American threat of an atomic attack in the Korean War. In addition, the film was not satisfactory to the hibakusha community, who "had greatly anticipated an unadulterated treatment of the subject once the Allied Occupation censorship was lifted" JTU commissioned Hideo Sekigawa to direct another adaptation of Children of the A-Bomb that would better address the union's agenda.

The film's production was a collaboration with the residents of Hiroshima. Survivors of the bombing, labor union members, and other residents of the city comprised the large number of extras used in the film numbered up to 90,000. Their presence helped recreate the sense of mass confusion in the scenes of the bombing's aftermath. Some even lent their bowls and other possessions from the blast as props for the film; the crew themselves also "worked tirelessly to collect rubble and rags for the film's production". City officials and local businesses also lent their full support.

Hiroshima-born lead actress Yumeji Tsukioka appealed to the production company with whom she was under contract, Shochiku, to let her act in the film without payment. She stated that she wanted to "contribute to society and help deter 'largescale wars.'"

== Release ==
Hiroshima was completed on August 6 and scheduled for released by Shochiku on August 10. However, Shochiku reneged, with a spokesman explaining that three scenes required cutting: the radio prologue, the scene calling the victims "guinea-pigs", and the scene involving the skulls of hibakusha. In late August, stills from the film were displayed by JTU representatives at the World Conference of Organizations of the Teaching Profession at Oxford. In response, The Daily Sketch published a front-page article under the headline "Nation of Mugs?" attacking the film and its themes as anti-British and anti-American, and especially insulting in light of the benefits Japan received during the Korean War. The story prompted negative coverage of the film in both English-language and Japanese publications. Ultimately, the five major studios including Shochiku withdrew interest in distributing the film.

JTU announced that they would self-distribute Hiroshima, with trial showings in the city of Hiroshima in September before expanding nationwide. However, in November, the Ministry of Education, Science, Sports and Culture reversed its resolution approving the release of Hiroshima, stating the film was "too anti-American to endorse school children’s viewing." The film had previously been approved by a committee of members of civil society for endorsement by the Ministry, but the Ministry overturned the decision and changed their rating system.

Hiroshima was released by in American theaters in 1955 by Continental Distributing Inc. The media campaign for the film was "an odd mixture of New York and national film critic hyperbole, along with sensationalist B-movie exploitation and appeals to patriotic civil defense preparedness," with one block advertisement reading "It blasts you out of your seat!" The export version of the film re-arranged into a linear narrative, and the opening narration and scenes following present-day high school students were reduced or removed. It was the first time many Americans had been able to see images of the effects of the atomic bombings.

In 1984, JTU passed distribution to a Tokyo-based company, which released a DVD in 2005.

Ippei Kobayashi, the son of the film's assistant director Taihei Kobayashi, had tried to get the film re-screened in public, but was unable to do so before he died. However, he had begun showing it independently in 2008 and enlisted student volunteers from Ritsumeikan University to translate the dialogue into English. His son, movie producer Kai Kobayashi, continued the revival project in the late 2010s. He had the film newly digitized in 2017 and had it screened in Kyoto and Hiroshima in 2019. The film streamed on FilmStruck in 2018 and was released on Blu-ray by Arrow Films in 2020.

== Reception ==
Kinema Junpo organized a special "Round Table" for Hiroshima in its December 1953 edition, with critics raising issues such as the duration of the post-explosion scenes and the idea of being able to fully represent the experience of hibakusha. A review in the November issue noted the raw and overwhelming nature of the film compared to the sentimentality of Children of Hiroshima but found issue with the narrative, which seemed like "two independent dramas".

Contemporary American critics, such as Bosley Crowther, focused largely on the intense and harrowing nature of the film. Time recommended Hiroshima despite pronouncing it "propaganda-heavy". William Zinsser of the New York Herald Tribune wrote "If everyone in the world could see ‘Hiroshima,’ there wouldn’t be any more wars."

Donald Richie compared the film unfavorably to Children of Hiroshima, praising the scenes following the explosion in Hiroshima but calling its present-day story a "statically filmed, tedious, polemic-filled tract" against Americans, comparing the film to propaganda documentaries Sekigawa made during the war.

== Legacy ==
Alain Resnais's French film Hiroshima mon amour (1959) starred this film's lead actor, Eiji Okada, and incorporated a few shots from the film.

In regard to controversy surrounding the film, Christopher Howard writes that "whilst some readings of Japanese 1950s or 1960s science-fiction or horror films [...] view them as Japan’s way of dealing with the unrepresentable ‘trauma’ of the atomic bombing, the outpour of international criticism over Hiroshima, for instance, also suggests an alternative history in which a representable trauma is too much, not for domestic audiences but for overseas onlookers."
