= Gendai-jin =

1952 film

Gendai-jin 現代人
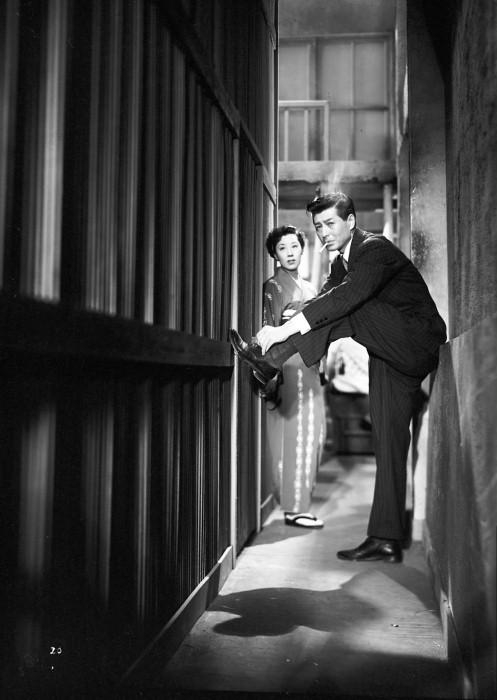
- Directed by: Minoru Shibuya
- Written by: Katsuto Inomata; Ryōsuke Saitō
- Produced by: Takeshi Yamamoto
- Starring: Ryō Ikebe
- Cinematography: Hiroyuki Nagaoka
- Release date: 3 September 1952
- Country: Japan
- Language: Japanese

Gendai-jin (現代人, Gendai-jin) is a 1952 black-and-white Japanese film directed by Minoru Shibuya. It was entered into the 1953 Cannes Film Festival.

== Cast ==
- Ryō Ikebe
- Isuzu Yamada
- So Yamamura
- Toshiko Kobayashi
- Yūko Mochizuki
- Shinsuke Ashida
- Yumi Takano
- Jun Tatara
