= Chōkōsō no Akebono =

Chōkōsō no akebono
- DVD cover
- Directed by: Hideo Sekigawa
- Screenplay by: Ujitoshi Iwasa; Eiichi Kudo
- Story by: Ryūzō Kikushima
- Produced by: Ujitoshi Iwasa
- Starring: Ryo Ikebe; Tetsurō Tamba
- Cinematography: Hanjiro Nakazawa
- Edited by: Yoshiki Nagasawa
- Music by: Masaru Satō
- Distributed by: Toei
- Release date: 14 May 1969 (Japan)
- Running time: 160 minutes
- Country: Japan
- Language: Japanese

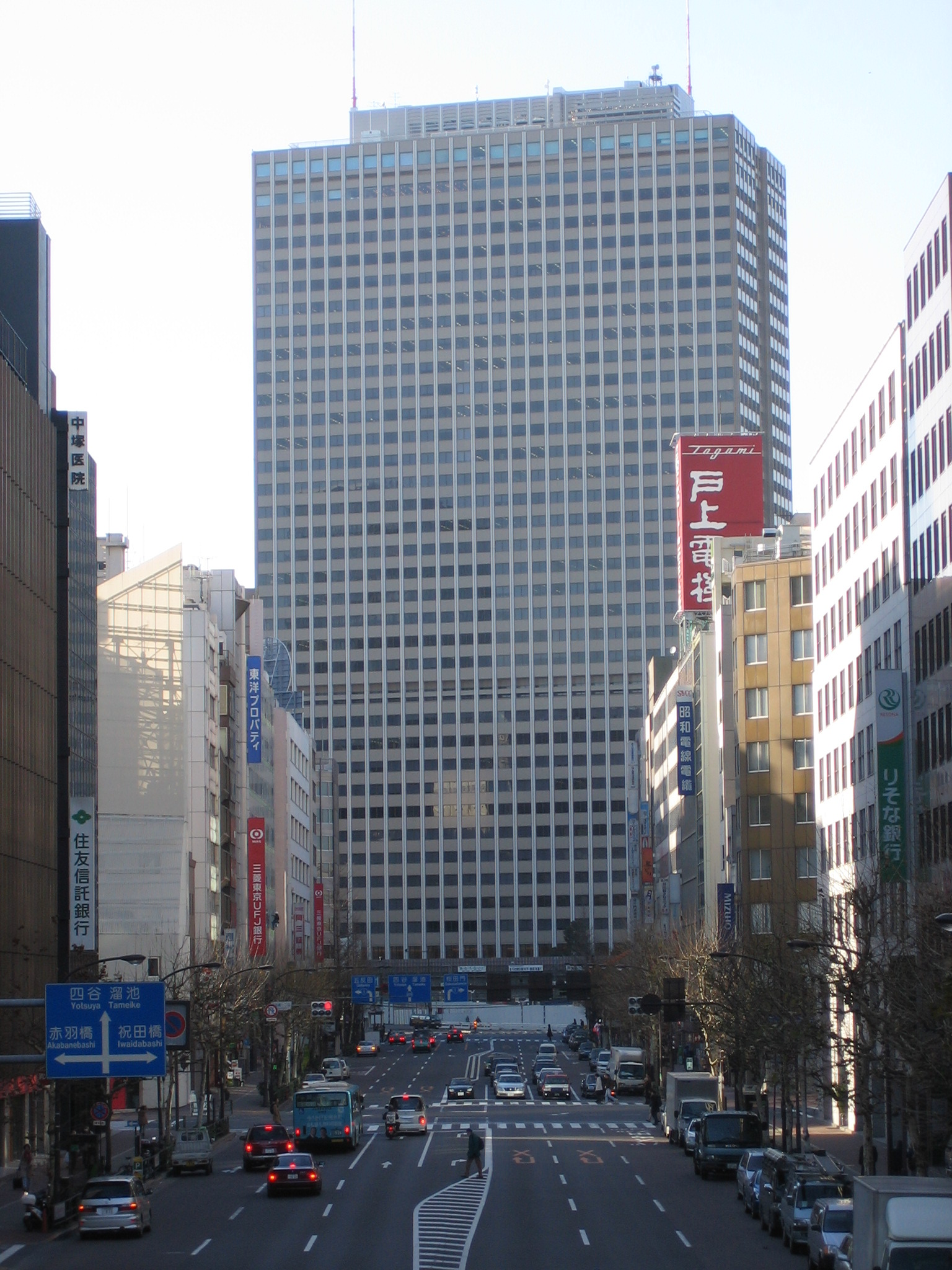
The Kasumigaseki Building, the subject of the film

Chōkōsō no Akebono (Japanese: 超高層のあけぼの, lit. 'Dawn of the Skyscraper') is a 1969 Japanese film about the construction of the Kasumigaseki Building, the first high-rise building in Japan. Kajima Construction, the builder of the Kasumigaseki building, was also the backer of the film. Mark Schilling of The Japan Times said that Kajima reportedly pushed 1.7 million advance tickets on its subcontractors and on ramen vendors who sold lunch to Kajima employees.

== Cast ==
- Ryō Ikebe as Ejiri
- Tetsurō Tanba as Kinoshita
- Isao Kimura as Saeki
- Mikijiro Hira
- Masakazu Tamura as Shimamura
- Yoshiko Sakuma as Naoko
- Nobuo Nakamura as Furukawa
- Michiyo Aratama
- Kuniko Miyake
- Tanie Kitabayashi
- Ichirō Sugai as Isobe
- Junzaburō Ban as Hoshino
- Nenji Kobayashi
- Eijirō Yanagi as Okabayashi
- Akiji Kobayashi as Komori
- Fumio Watanabe as Takemoto
- Matsumoto Hakuō I as Kawashima
- Shūji Sano as Kashima
