= Christ in Bronze =

1955 film

- Directed by: Minoru Shibuya
- Written by: Yoshiro Nagayo; Ryosuke Saito
- Produced by: Shochiku
- Starring: Eiji Okada
- Cinematography: Hiroyuki Nagaoka
- Edited by: Yoshi Sugihara
- Production company: Shochiku
- Release date: October 11, 1955
- Running time: 100 minutes
- Country: Japan
- Language: Japanese

Christ in Bronze (青銅の基督, Seido no Kirisuto) is a 1955 black-and-white Japanese film directed by Minoru Shibuya. It was entered into the 1956 Cannes Film Festival.

== Cast ==
- Eiji Okada
- Kazuko Okada
- Osamu Takizawa
- Shinobu Araki
- Akira Ishihama
- Kyōko Kagawa
- Kinzo Shin
- Kōji Mitsui
- Isao Yamagata
- Hitomi Nozoe
