= Chieko Higashiyama =

Japanese actress (1890–1980)

- 東山 千栄子
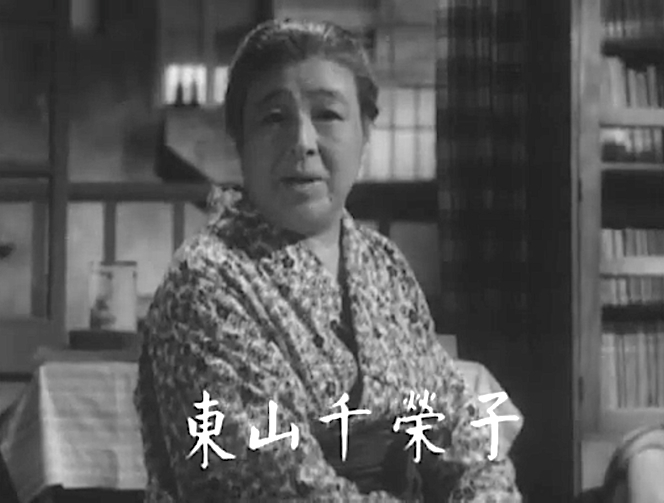
- Chieko Higashiyama in the 1953 film Tokyo Story
- Born: 30 September 1890; Chiba, Japan
- Died: 8 May 1980 (aged 89); Yokohama, Japan
- Occupation: Actress
- Years active: 1925–1980

Chieko Higashiyama (東山 千栄子, Higashiyama Chieko; 30 September 1890 – 8 May 1980) was a Japanese stage and film actress. She appeared in more than 60 films from 1936 to 1967.

== Career ==
Graduating from the girls' school at Gakushuin, she married a businessman in 1909 and spent eight years in Moscow. In 1925, at the age of 35, she became an actress and then trained at the Tsukiji Shōgekijō. She appeared in many stage productions, most famously as Madame Ranevskaya in The Cherry Orchard. She also appeared in films, including Tokyo Story, which was voted the best film of all time in a poll of film directors by Sight and Sound magazine.

== Selected filmography ==
Year	Title	Role	Notes
1947	The Love of the Actress Sumako		
1951	The Idiot		
1951	The Tale of Genji		
1951	Early Summer	Shige	
1952	The Life of Oharu		
1952	Carmen's Pure Love	Housemaid	
1953	Tokyo Story	Tomi	
1954	The Garden of Women	Schoolmaster	
1954	The Princess Sen	Yodo-dono	
1955	The Maid's Kid	Hatsu's mother	
1957	The Blue Sky Maiden		
1958	The Loyal 47 Ronin	Otaka	
1959	The Snow Flurry	Tomi	
1960	The Wandering Princess		
1966	The Kii River		

== Honours ==
- Medal with Purple Ribbon (1956)
- Order of the Precious Crown, 4th Class, Wisteria (1965)
- Person of Cultural Merit (1966)
- Order of the Precious Crown, 3rd class, Butterfly (1974)
