= Children of Hiroshima =

1952 Japanese film

- Kanji: 原爆の子
- Revised Hepburn: Genbaku no ko
- Directed by: Kaneto Shindō
- Written by: Kaneto Shindō; Arata Osada (book)
- Produced by: Kōzaburō Yoshimura
- Starring: Nobuko Otowa
- Cinematography: Takeo Itō
- Edited by: Zenju Imaizumi
- Music by: Akira Ifukube
- Production company: Kindai Eiga Kyōkai
- Release date: 6 August 1952 (Japan)
- Running time: 98 Minutes
- Country: Japan
- Language: Japanese

Children of Hiroshima (Japanese: 原爆の子, Hepburn: Genbaku no ko; lit. "Children of the Atomic Bomb") is a 1952 Japanese drama film directed by Kaneto Shindō and starring Nobuko Otowa. It was written by Shindō based on the 1951 book Children of the Atomic Bomb by Arata Osada.

== Plot ==
Takako Ishikawa is a teacher on an island in the inland sea off the coast of post-war Hiroshima. During her summer holiday, she takes the ferry to her hometown Hiroshima to visit the graves of her parents and younger sister, who were killed in the Atomic bombing. She sees a beggar and recognises him as Iwakichi, a former servant of her parents, now burned on the face and partially blind. She follows him to his poor shack, where he is looked after by a woman living next door, and asks about his family. With his wife, his son and daughter-in-law dead, Iwakichi's only surviving relative is his grandson Tarō, who lives in an orphanage. Takako visits the orphanage and finds the children barely have enough to eat. She offers to take Iwakichi and his grandson back with her, but Iwakichi refuses, running away.

Takako goes on to visit Natsue Morikawa, a former colleague at the kindergarten where she used to teach, and now a midwife. Natsue has been rendered sterile as an aftereffect of the bomb, and is planning to adopt a child with her husband. Natsue and Takako visit the site of the kindergarten, which is now destroyed, and Takako decides to visit the students of the kindergarten.

The father of the first student she visits, Sanpei, has suddenly been taken ill from a radiation-related illness and dies just before she arrives. Another one of the students is terminally ill and dying in a church, where many people with bomb-related injuries are gathered.

After staying the night in Natsue's house, she then goes to visit another student, Heita. His sister, who has an injured leg, is just about to get married, and Takako dines with her. She talks to Heita's older brother Kōji about the people who died or were injured in the war.

She returns to Iwakichi's house and asks him again to let her take Tarō back to the island. At first he refuses, but later his neighbour convinces him to let Takako take care of Tarō. However, Tarō still refuses to leave his grandfather. On the last evening before Takako's departure, Iwakichi invites Tarō for a meal, gives him new shoes he bought for him, and sends him to Takako with a letter. Then he sets his house on fire. He survives the fire but is badly burned and eventually dies. Tarō leaves Hiroshima together with Takako, carrying his grandfather's ashes.

== Cast ==
- Nobuko Otowa as Takako Ishikawa
- Osamu Takizawa as Iwakichi
- Miwa Saitō as Natsue Morikawa
- Tsuneko Yamanaka as child
- Hideji Ōtaki as Sanpei's neighbor
- Takashi Itō as Taro
- Chikako Hosokawa as Setsu, Takako's mother
- Masao Shimizu as Toshiaki, Takako's father
- Yuriko Hanabusa as Oine
- Tanie Kitabayashi as Otoyo
- Tsutomu Shimomoto as Natsue's husband
- Eijirō Tōno
- Taiji Tonoyama as the ship captain
- Jūkichi Uno as Kōji, Heita's oldest brother
- Tomoko Naraoka as Sakie, Heita's older sister

== Production ==
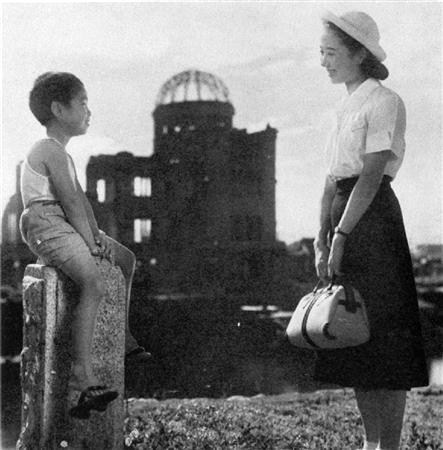
Still from the film

The film was commissioned by the Japan Teachers' Union and was based on first-person testimonies gathered by Japanese educator Arata Osada, collected in the 1951 book Children of the Atomic Bomb. The end of the post-war occupation of Japan by American forces allowed the production of works addressing the atomic bombings of Hiroshima and Nagaski.

== Release ==
Children of Hiroshima was shown in competition at the 1953 Cannes Film Festival.

== Reception ==
The film was successful in Japan on its initial release, but the Japan Teachers' Union, which had commissioned the film, criticized its "outsider" view of the physical and personal devastation of the bombing and especially the lack of clear political and social criticism, concentrating instead on the stories of a few individuals. The union then commissioned another film, Hiroshima (released in 1953), by director Hideo Sekigawa, which was far more graphic in its depiction of the bombing's aftermath and far more critical of both American and Japanese leaders who had brought about the disaster.

The Monthly Film Bulletin wrote: "Although Children of Hiroshima relies on a repetitive and rather conventionalised story line, its message is disturbingly clear. The director, Kaneto Shindo (who also wrote the script) wisely avoids the sensational approach, and the narrative is surprisingly free from recrimination and bitterness; there is, instead, a kind of baffled anger and regret that the events of ten years ago should, even now, cast a shadow of death over the lives of the Japanese people. ... In the circumstances, the characters and situations rarely become more than symbols of the film's point of view, the old beggar, in particular, belonging to an over-familiar convention. There are, nevertheless, a number of passages which are both moving and imaginatively conceived, notably the remarkable flashback to 1945 with its harsh images of charred bodies and staring faces, the formal and strangely sad wedding supper and the short dialogue on the bridge above the river. The human sympathy evident in these scenes owes something to the playing, which, though never exceptional, has the natural grace and ease of movement to be found in the Japanese period films. The musical score, with its soft, chanting voices, is also impressive."

Sight & Sound wrote: "Gembaku No Ko ... is a sincere and thoughtful attempt to come to dramatic terms with a subject of horrifying urgency. Though its responses are direct and genuine, however, it is not a very imaginative or, in itself, memorable work. The dramatic framework is a good one ... The mood is gentle and deliberately restrained. Behind the individual situations, the young director, Kaneto Shindo, aims to sketch in the general related patterns of everyday life in a broken city, and each thread leads back, directly or indirectly, to August 6th, 1945. This is a city of orphans, of bereavements, of the "illness." Nothing – except a formalised sequence, set to choral music, evoking the nightmare of the bomb itself, a sunflower instantaneously scorched and withered, bodies naked and mutilated, the swelling pillar of smoke, all of which stands out from the rest as a too conscious set-piece – is overstressed. Yet what is lacking is the true personal sensibility that might have made the film a work of art instead of an honourable attempt at one."

In 1959, film historian Donald Richie perceived a major weakness in the film, its "coupling of the most lifelike naturalism with truly excessive sentimentality", but emphasized that "it showed the aftermath of the bomb without any vicious polemic".

Children of Hiroshima was met with positive reviews on its American debut in 2011. In a review of the film, where he also comments on its place in Kaneto Shindō's career, The New York Times critic A.O. Scott remarks: "Mr. Shindo combines austerity and sensuality to stirring, sometimes mesmerizing effect. The beauty of the compositions in Children of Hiroshima — the clarity of focus, the graceful balance within the frames — provides some relief from the grimness of his subject. […] He contemplates Japan’s wartime experience with regret, rather than indignation".

In The Village Voice, J. Hoberman called it "a somber melodrama" which lacks in subtlety but has "the capacity to wound". Film scholar Alexander Jacoby resumed, "it remains one of Shindo’s most moving films, and a testament to the anti-war spirit that took root in Japan after its defeat".

The film holds a score of 86/100 on review aggregation site Metacritic.

== Themes and analysis ==
The film commemorates the a-bomb attack on Hiroshima and the tragedies that followed, which the U.S. forces censored during their occupation of Japan that ended months before the film’s release. The film commemorates the hibakusha people and highlights how they were ostracized in Japanese society through characters who are refused work due to their visible injuries caused by the bombs and the radiation. However, the film also promotes Japan’s sentiment of victimization through the tragedy of nuclear attacks. It leaves out the struggles of other Asian countries during the war and how Japan was also a victimizer. There is a lack of a larger context of wartime Japan within the film as it depicts Japan as a calm and prosperous place before the bombs. The film displays the victimization of Japan in flashback scenes of the bombing, where children cry over their dead mother's bodies, representing a broken bond of life. The film’s emphasis on the destruction that followed the bombing resonates with the anti-war and pro-democracy messages of several social interest groups, including the Japan Teachers' Union.

== Legacy ==
Children of Hiroshima was screened at a 2012 retrospective on Shindō and Kōzaburō Yoshimura in London, organised by the British Film Institute and the Japan Foundation.

== See also ==
- Hiroshima (1953)
- Godzilla (1954)
