= The Blue Sky Maiden =

1957 film by Yasuzō Masumura

Japanese name
- Kanji: 青空娘
- Directed by: Yasuzō Masumura
- Written by: Shirasaka Yoshio (screenplay); Keita Genji (novel)
- Produced by: Masaichi Nagata
- Starring: Ayako Wakao; Kenji Sugawara; Kinzō Shin; Keizo Kawasaki; Chieko Higashiyama
- Cinematography: Michio Takahashi
- Edited by: Tatsuji Nakashizushi
- Music by: Taichiro Kosugi
- Production company: Daiei Film
- Release date: 8 October 1957 (Japan)
- Running time: 88 mins
- Country: Japan
- Language: Japanese

The Blue Sky Maiden (青空娘, Aozora musume) is a 1957 melodrama film directed by Yasuzō Masumura. The screenplay was written by Yoshio Shirasaka, based on a novel by Keita Genji.

The Blue Sky Maiden is an early work by Masumura and notably the first collaboration between Masumura and actress Ayako Wakao, who would become a frequent collaborator. It also stars Keizō Kawasaki, Kinzō Shin, and Chieko Higashiyama.

== Premise ==
Yuko is a teenage girl living far away from her rich family. One day, her dying grandmother reveals to her the truth about her real mother, and she decides to find her.

== Reception ==
The film is frequently discussed as an early example of Yasuzō Masumura’s thematic concerns, including class inequality, postwar family dysfunction, and resistance to social conformity. The British Film Institute described the film as part of Masumura’s early work that uses melodrama to critique traditional family structures, framing it as a "denouncement of traditional family norms."

It has also been characterized as a "fresh, colourful and sharply satirical Cinderella story", indicating its mixture of genre familiarity and critical edge.

The film is regarded as an important early work in Masumura’s career, and it continues to be screened in international retrospectives and festivals.
