= Yuriko Hanabusa =

Japanese actress (1900–1970)

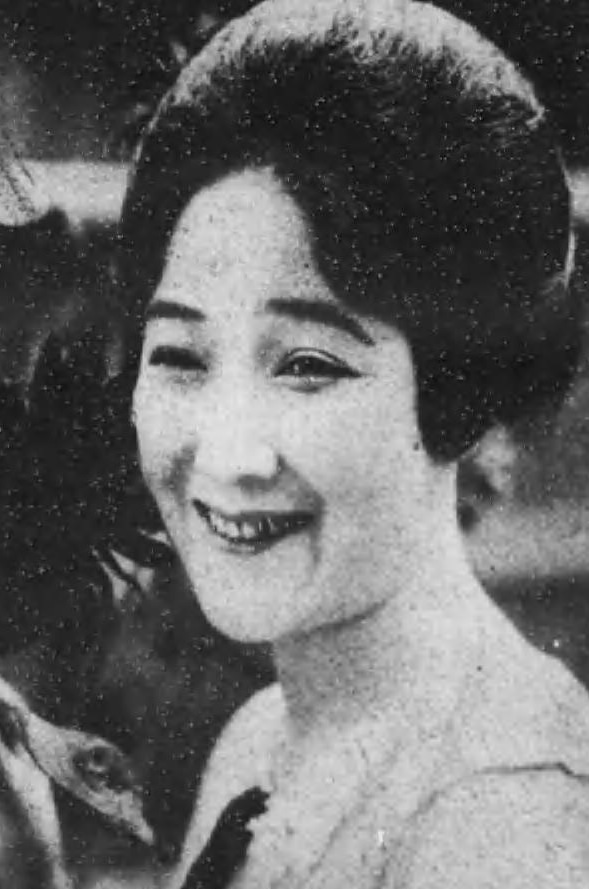
- circa 1926
- Born: 7 March 1900; Kure, Hiroshima, Japan
- Died: 7 February 1970 (aged 69)
- Occupation: Actress
- Years active: 1920-1970

Yuriko Hanabusa (英百合子, Hanabusa Yuriko; 7 March 1900 – 7 February 1970) was a Japanese actress. She appeared in more than 80 films between 1920 and 1970.

== Selected filmography ==
- Souls on the Road (1921)
- Wife! Be Like a Rose! (1935)
- The Daughter of the Samurai (1937)
- Young People (1937)
- Spring on Leper's Island (1940)
- Listen to the Voices of the Sea (1950)
- Story of a Beloved Wife (1951)
- The Tale of Genji (1951)
- Children of Hiroshima (1952)
- Rikon (1952)
- Epitome (1953)
- Life of a Woman (1953)
- The Elegant Life of Mr. Everyman (1963)
