= Sozenji Baba =

1928 film

- DVD cover
- Directed by: Masahiro Makino
- Written by: Itaro Yamagata
- Starring: Komei Minami; Shinpei Takagi; Tsukie Matsuura; Toroku Makino
- Cinematography: Minoru Miki
- Production company: Makino Film Productions
- Distributed by: Digital Meme (DVD)
- Release date: November 14, 1928 (Japan)
- Running time: 11 reels (original); 32 minutes (DVD)
- Country: Japan
- Language: Silent

Sozenji Baba (Japanese: 崇禅寺馬場, Hepburn: Sozenji Baba) is a 1928 black and white Japanese silent drama film directed by Masahiro Makino. It is an ambitious film in which Makino deals with the difficult issue of the agony of a person who killed for revenge.
