= Singing Lovebirds =

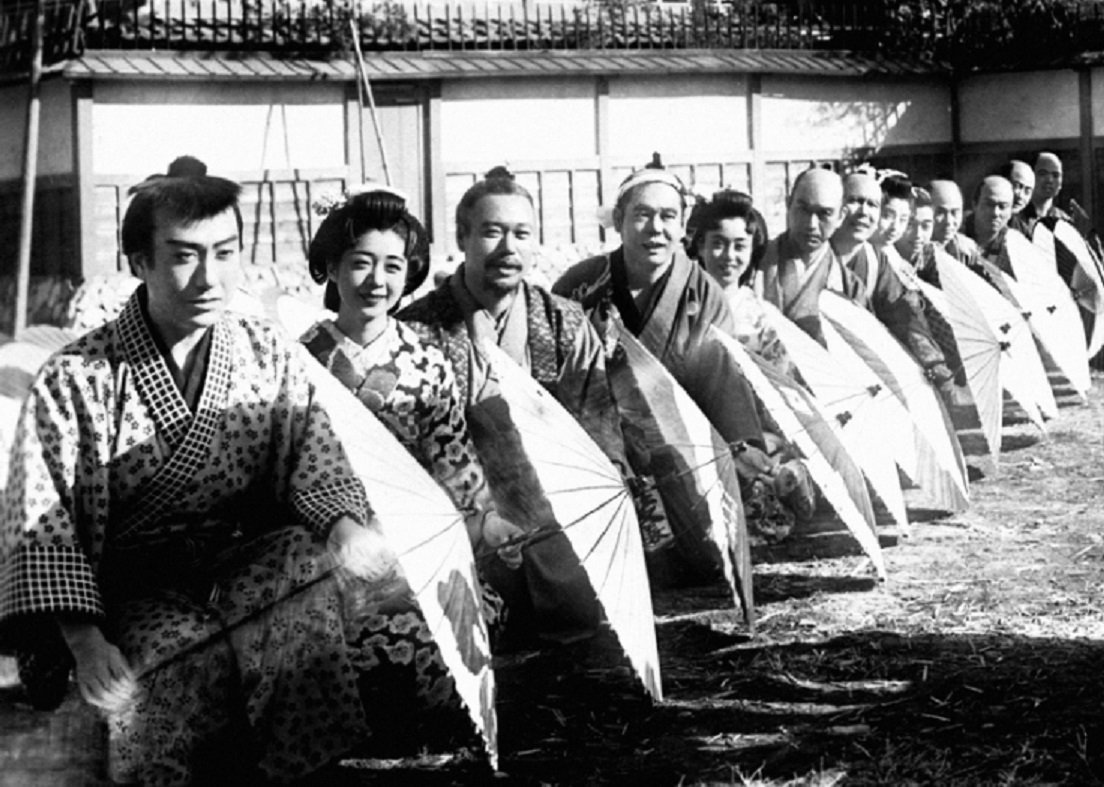
- Screenshot from the film
- Directed by: Masahiro Makino
- Starring: Chiezō Kataoka; Takashi Shimura
- Cinematography: Kazuo Miyagawa
- Music by: Tokujirō Ōkubo
- Production company: Nikkatsu
- Release date: 14 December 1939 (Japan)
- Running time: 69 minutes
- Country: Japan
- Language: Japanese

Singing Lovebirds (Japanese: 鴛鴦歌合戦, Hepburn: Oshidori utagassen) is a 1939 Japanese musical comedy film directed by Masahiro Makino. Makino made the film in only two weeks while the production of another film, Yaji Kita Dōchūki, was put on hold after its star, Chiezō Kataoka, came down with appendicitis (Kataoka's scenes in Singing Lovebirds were filmed in only a few hours). The film, however, has become "the most frequently revived Japanese pre-war musical film," featuring music ranging from jazz to jōruri, and music stars like Dick Mine. Masahiro Makino produced other musicals, like Hanako-san (1943) and was known for his rhythmic style. Singing Lovebirds also features Takashi Shimura, most famous as the lead samurai in Akira Kurosawa's Seven Samurai, in a singing role.

== Plot ==
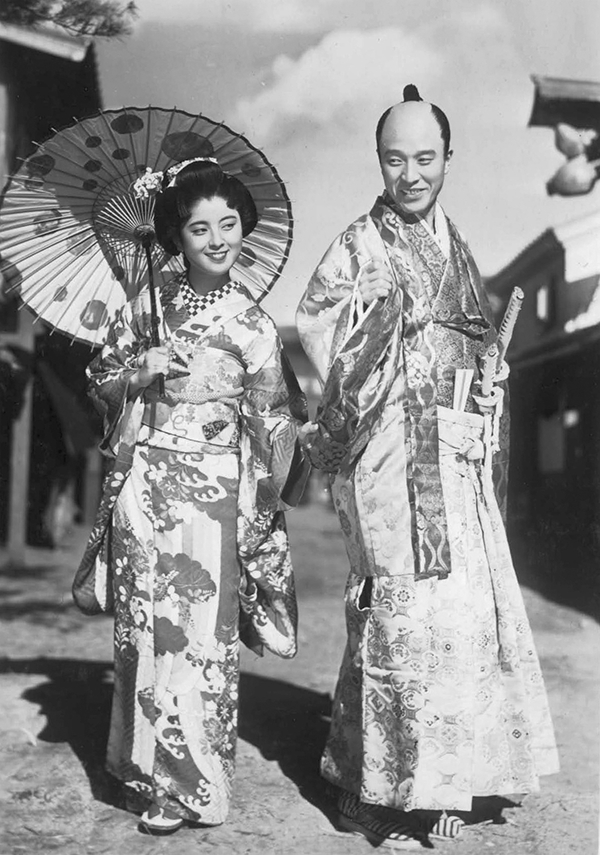
Screenshot from the film

Oharu is the daughter of Kyōsai Shimura, a rōnin who now makes his living making umbrellas. She is in love with another rōnin, Reisaburō Asai, who lives next door, but he is being pursued by two of the town beauties, Otomi and Fujio. To make things even more difficult for Oharu, her father is obsessed with antiques, buying them even though he has little money and even when most of them eventually turn out to be fakes. A mistake, however, puts him deeply in debt to the local lord, Minezawa Tanba no Kami, and he is confronted with having to sell Oharu in order to pay it off.

== Cast ==
- Chiezō Kataoka as Reisaburō Asai, a rōnin
- Takashi Shimura as Kyōsai Shimura, a former rōnin who makes umbrellas
- Haruyo Ichikawa as Oharu, Kyōsai's daughter
- Dick Mine as Tanba no Kami Minezawa, the local lord
- Tomiko Hattori as Otomi
- Fujiko Fukamizu as Fujio

== Adaptation ==
- In 2023, Japanese all-female theatre troupe Takarazuka Revue staged a musical production of the film under the same title. The production was adapted and directed by Naoko Koyanagi, and starred Flower Troupe's Rei Yuzuka as Reisaburō Asai, Madoka Hoshikaze as Oharu, Shou Kazumi as Kyōsai Shimura, Sea Towaki as Tanbanokami Minezawa, Misaki Hoshizora as Otomi and Ai Mihane as Fujio.
