= The Song Lantern =

1943 Japanese film

- Film poster

Japanese name
- Kanji: 歌行燈
- Directed by: Mikio Naruse
- Written by: Mantarō Kubota; Kyōka Izumi (novel)
- Produced by: Motohiko Itō
- Starring: Shōtarō Hanayagi; Isuzu Yamada; Ichijirō Ōya; Eijirō Yanagi
- Cinematography: Asaichi Nakai
- Edited by: Yoshiki Nagasawa
- Music by: Shirō Fukai
- Production company: Toho
- Distributed by: Toho
- Release date: 11 February 1943 (Japan)
- Running time: 93 minutes
- Country: Japan
- Language: Japanese

The Song Lantern (Japanese: 歌行燈, Hepburn: Uta andon), also titled A Song by Lantern Light, is a 1943 Japanese drama film by Mikio Naruse. It is based on a novel by Kyōka Izumi.

== Plot ==
Japan in the Meiji era: Kitahachi, son of famous noh actor Genzaburo Onchi, is disowned by his father after Kitahachi's humiliation of noh singer Sozan results in Sozan's suicide. Also, Genzaburo forbids Kitahachi ever to perform again. When Kitahachi, who now earns his money as a street musician, learns that Sozan's daughter Osode tries to find work as a geisha but struggles with her inability to play an instrument, he teaches her the art of noh dancing. During his stay in Kuwana, Genzaburo is impressed by Osode's dancing skills and, upon hearing that she was instructed by Kitahachi, reunites with his son.

== Cast ==
- Shōtarō Hanayagi as Kitahachi Onchi
- Isuzu Yamada as Osode
- Ichijirō Ōya as Genzaburo Onchi
- Masaro Muata as Sozan
- Eijirō Yanagi as Jirozo

== Background ==
The Song Lantern starred Shōtarō Hanayagi, a popular shinpa and film actor, who had previously appeared in the lead role in Kenji Mizoguchi's The Story of the Last Chrysanthemums (1939), which too portrayed a stage actor during the Meiji period.

== Reception ==
According to Naruse biographer Catherine Russell, the director was faced with interferences by the Home Ministry during the film's production, and while she calls the submissive character of Osode "not well developed", she points out the elegance of some of the film's sequences.

In his 2005 review for Slant Magazine, Keith Uhlich titled The Song Lantern an "intoxicating work" and "visual marvel", comparable to the works of Mizoguchi.

== Legacy ==
The Song Lantern was screened at the Museum of Modern Art in 1985 and at the Harvard Film Archive in 2005 as part of their retrospectives on Mikio Naruse.
