= Shimanagashi =

Japanese punishment of banishment to small islands

Shimanagashi (Japanese: 島流し) is a form of punishment where people are banished to small islands. It was created during the feudal period in Japan, where political offenders were often sent away and confined on the island of Sado in the Sea of Japan.

One of the earliest recordings of the punishment was in 434, where a woman was sentenced to exile (ruzai), however shimanagashi become a popular punishment during the Edo period, considered the second worst punishment, only behind execution.

In astronomy and space exploration, shimanagashi syndrome (a term derived from the punishment) is a psychological issue where an astronaut feels that they are alone, feeling left out of society, in space exploration this can occur during long trips throughout the astronaut's space journey or when an astronaut may, in the future, land on other planets.
