= Minoru Shibuya =

Japanese film director

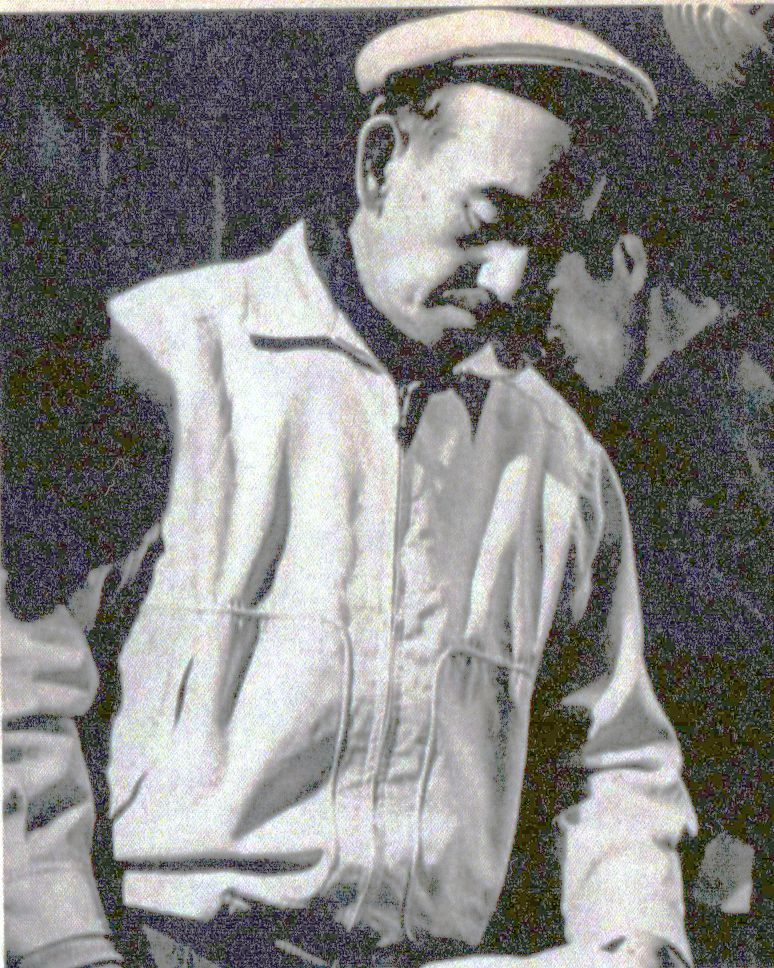
- Born: 2 January 1907; Tokyo, Japan
- Died: 20 December 1980 (aged 73)
- Occupation: Film director
- Years active: 1937-1966

Minoru Shibuya (渋谷実, Shibuya Minoru; 2 January 1907 – 20 December 1980) was a Japanese film director.

== Career ==
Born in Tokyo, Shibuya attended Keiō University but left before graduating. He joined Shochiku in 1930 and worked as an assistant under Yasujirō Ozu, Mikio Naruse, and Heinosuke Gosho, before making his debut as a director in 1937. Shibuya "worked with equal facility in comedy and melodrama, [and] made his mark as an ironic but compassionate chronicler of the difficulties of the early postwar period".

One notable film was The Radish and the Carrot, which was supposed to be Ozu's next film before he died. But as the critic Chris Fujiwara notes, Shibuya's "films are a world apart from Ozu: harsh, sometimes strident, in tone, splashed with dark humor, tending to contort the human body or thrust it into the bottoms of violently modernist compositions".

He directed over four dozen films between 1937 and 1966.

== Selected filmography ==
- Mama no endan (ママの縁談) (1937)
- Haha to ko (母と子) (1938)
- Passion Fire (情炎 Joen) 1947
- Gendai-jin (現代人) (1952)
- Honjitsu kyūshin (本日休診) (1952)
- Christ in Bronze (青銅の基督 Seidō no Kirisuto) (1956)
- Seigiha (正義派) (1957)
- Akujo no kisetsu (悪女の季節) (1958)
- Mozu (もず) (1961)
- Kōjin kōjitsu (好人好日) (1961)
- Yopparai tengoku (酔っぱらい天国) (1961)
- The Radish and the Carrot (大根と人参 Daikon to ninjin) (1965)
