= Tōjin Okichi (1954 film) =

Tōjin Okichi; 唐人お吉
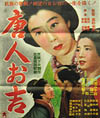
- Japanese movie poster
- Directed by: Mitsuo Wakasugi
- Screenplay by: Tokuhei Wakao; Mitsuo Wakasugi; Yoshikata Yoda
- Cinematography: Junichi Segawa
- Release date: 15 January 1954 (Japan)
- Running time: 101 minutes
- Country: Japan
- Language: Japanese

Tōjin Okichi (唐人お吉, Tōjin Okichi) is a 1954 Japanese drama film directed by Mitsuo Wakasugi.

== Cast ==
- Isuzu Yamada
- Kenji Susukida
- Tsutomu Shimomoto
- Michiko Saga
