= Gendai-geki =

Japanese film, television, and theater genre

Gendai-geki (現代劇) is a genre of film and television or theater play in Japan. Unlike the jidai-geki genre of period dramas, whose stories are set in the Edo period, gendai-geki stories are contemporary dramas set in the modern world. These films take place in the world the audience lived in at that moment.

For decades, Japanese cinema was divided into two primary genres:Jidai-geki — period dramas Gendai-geki — films about contemporary life: an important distinction. Shomin-geki were popular Japanese movies in the early 1930s that showed the daily lives of ordinary middle-class city families. Ozu Yasujiro, the best-known director of this genre, used these films to show how shaky middle-class life could be, especially when people were worried about losing their jobs.

== Yasujiro Ozu ==
Yasujiro Ozu (1903–1963) was a major Japanese film director known for portraying everyday Japanese urban life and family relationships. He debuted in 1927 with Sword of Penitence, and became known for gendai geki (contemporary dramas). A story of floating weeds if gendai-geki because it takes place in the 1930s and shows everyday life as people actually lived it.

Ozu began directing in 1927 at Shochiku’s Kamata Studio with a silent jidai-geki (period drama) titled Sword of Penitence. He soon shifted his focus to gendai-geki (stories set in modern times) and helped launch the shōshimin-geki genre films about lower-middle-class salarymen with works like Tokyo Chorus (1931), and I Was Born, But… .

== Shochiku ==
During this time, Shochiku was producing a steady stream of gendai-geki; films set in the present and the selections in this group are all urban melodramas focused on the working poor. They highlight the severely limited paths available to young women. Shochiku Co. announced plans to remake Yasujiro Ozu’s 1953 masterpiece Tokyo Story.

Tokyo Story is widely regarded as one of the greatest films ever made, almost “perfect” in the eyes of film lovers. Ozu’s original film portrayed 1950s Japan, a society rapidly modernizing after the war. The original story showed adult children too busy with their new urban lives to care for their aging parents.

== See also ==
- Sewamono (世話物) - the contemporary setting plays of bunraku and kabuki
- Cinema of Japan
- Shomin-geki
- Jidai-geki
