= Masahiro Makino =

Japanese film director and actor (1908–1993)

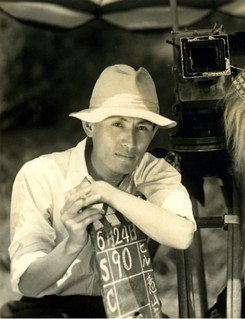
- Born: February 29, 1908; Kyoto, Japan
- Died: October 29, 1993 (aged 85)
- Occupations: Film director and actor
- Spouse: Yukiko Todoroki
- Father: Shōzō Makino
- Relatives: Anna Makino (granddaughter); Sadatsugu Matsuda (half-brother)

Masahiro Makino (マキノ 雅弘, Makino Masahiro; February 29, 1908 – October 29, 1993) was a Japanese film director. He directed more than 260 films, primarily in the chanbara and yakuza genres. His real name was Masatada (正唯), but he took the stage name Masahiro, the kanji for which he changed multiple times (including 雅広, 正博, and 雅裕).

== Career ==
Masahiro Makino was born in Kyoto, the eldest son of the film director and producer Shōzō Makino, who is often called the father of Japanese cinema. As a youth he acted in over 100 films before debuting as a film director in 1926 at age 18. His critically acclaimed nihilistic jidaigeki such as Roningai (1928) made him one of the top Japanese film directors, but his way of shooting films quickly also earned him detractors. For instance, the total time it took to shoot the 1936 film Edo no Ka Oshō was only 28 hours. The critic Sadao Yamane, however, has argued that this fast filming practice also contributed to Makino's speedy, rhythmic film style. Rhythm and tempo are important to his films, and so in his jidaigeki, fight scenes like in Kettō Takadanobaba (1937) could seem like dances, or entire sequences, like in Awa no Odoriko (1941), could be filled with dance. He made musicals like Singing Lovebirds (1939) and even his wartime propaganda films like Hanako-san and Ahen senso (both 1943) could have Busby Berkeley-like musical numbers.

After the war, he helmed such popular jidaigeki series as Jirōchō Sangokushi and such ninkyō eiga series as Nihon Kyōkaku-den. He directed his last film in 1972, the retirement film for Junko Fuji, completing a filmography that totaled over 260 films and included films of many genres.

== Personal life ==
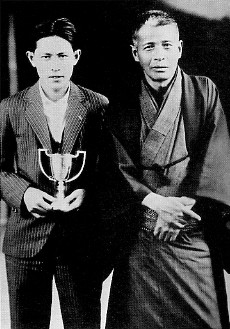
1928, Masahiro Makino with his father Shōzō Makino

Masahiro's half-brother, Sadatsugu Matsuda (1906–2003), was also a popular film director. Another brother, Mitsuo Makino, was an important film producer, and yet another, Shinzō Makino, also worked as a director (his wife was the actress Chikako Miyagi). Masahiro's sister, Tomoko Makino, married the actor Kunitarō Sawamura, and gave birth to the actors Masahiko Tsugawa and Hiroyuki Nagato, each of whom married famous actresses (Yukiji Asaoka and Yōko Minamida respectively). Kunitarō's brother and sister (brother and sister-in-law to Masahiro) are the actors Daisuke Katō and Sadako Sawamura. The pseudonym that Masahiko Tsugawa took when he became a director, Makino Masahiko, is a tribute to Masahiro.

Masahiro married the actress Yukiko Todoroki and their son, Masayuki Makino, is the head of the Okinawa Actor's School, famous for training a number of Japan's top female pop singers. His second wife was also an actress, and one of their two daughters became an actress.

== Selected filmography ==
=== As director ===
- Sozenji Baba (1928)
- Roningai (1928, 1929)
- Singing Lovebirds (1939)
- Ahen senso (1943)
- Rikon (1952)
- Adauchi sōzenji baba (1957)
- Mask of the Moon (1961)

=== As actor ===
- Raiden (1928)
- The Man Who Came to Port (1952)
