= Hideo Sekigawa =

Japanese film director (1908–1977)

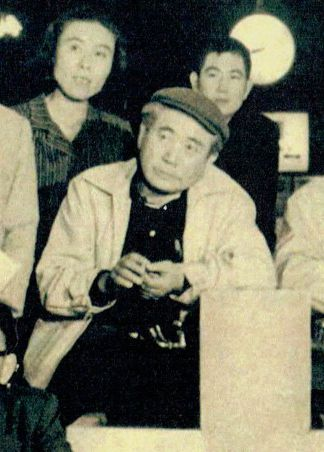
- Born: 1 December 1908; Sado, Japan
- Died: 16 December 1977 (aged 69); Tokyo, Japan
- Occupation: Film director
- Years active: 1946–1969

Hideo Sekigawa (関 川 秀雄, Sekigawa Hideo; 1 December 1908 – 16 December 1977) was a Japanese film director known mainly for films with a left-wing agenda made in the late 1940s and early 1950s. His most noted works are the anti-war films Listen to the Voices of the Sea (1950) and Hiroshima (1953).

== Life ==
Hideo Sekigawa joined the documentary branch of P.C.L. film studios (later Toho) in the 1930s where he worked on militarist propaganda films despite his Communist leanings. After the Second World War, Sekigawa debuted as co-director of the pro-unionist Those Who Make Tomorrow (1946) which was intended to illustrate the purpose of the workers' union at the Toho film studios.

Having difficulties finding work due to his political leanings, he directed the anti-war film Listen to the Voices of the Sea for Mitsuo Makino's Toyoko Eiga company, later the Toei Company. For the Japan Teachers' Union, which had been unhappy with Kaneto Shindo's Children of Hiroshima for not being political enough, he directed Hiroshima (1953) in a semi-documentary style, parts of which were later used (uncredited) by Alain Resnais for his drama Hiroshima mon amour.

In later years, Sekigawa's output included both audience-orientated genre works and documentaries. His last film was the 1969 Chōkōsō no Akebono.

== Selected filmography ==
- 1946: Those Who Make Tomorrow (明日を作る人々, Asu o tsukuru hitobito) co-director with Akira Kurosawa and Kajirō Yamamoto
- 1947: A Second Life (第二 の 人生, Daini no jinsei)
- 1950: Listen to the Voices of the Sea (日本戦歿学生の手記 きけ、わだつみの声, Nippon senbotsu gakusei no shuki: Kike wadatsumi no koe)
- 1952: Mixed-Blooded Children (混血 児, Konketsuji)
- 1953: Hiroshima (ひろしま)
- 1969: Chōkōsō no Akebono (超高層のあけぼの)
