= Utamaro and His Five Women =

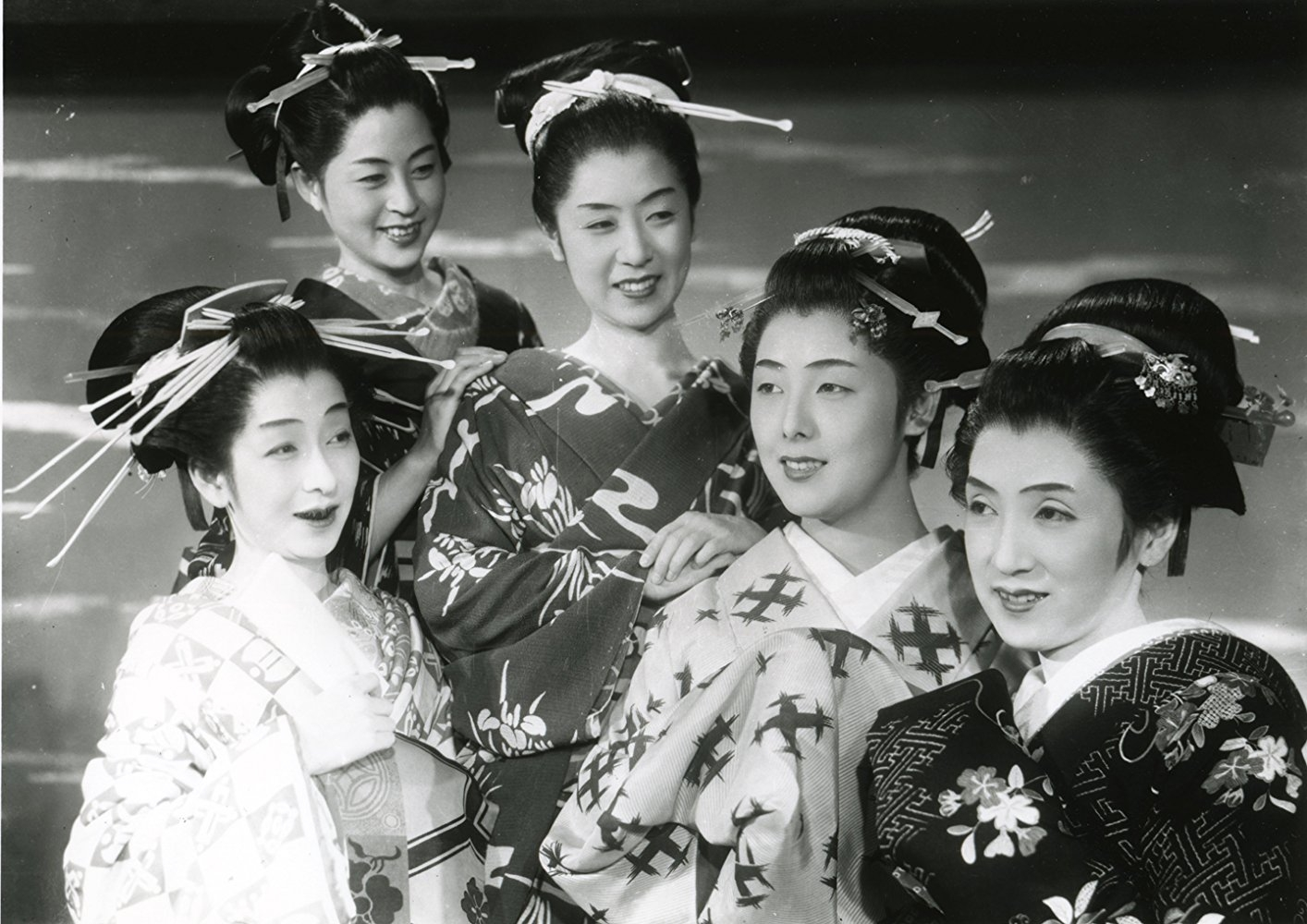
- Directed by: Kenji Mizoguchi
- Written by: Yoshikata Yoda (screenplay); Kanji Kunieda (novel)
- Starring: Minosuke Bandō; Kinuyo Tanaka; Kōtarō Bandō; Hiroko Kawasaki; Toshiko Iizuka
- Cinematography: Minoru Miki
- Edited by: Shintarō Miyamoto
- Music by: Tamezō Mochizuki; Hisato Ōsawa
- Production company: Shochiku
- Distributed by: Shochiku
- Release date: December 1946 (Japan); (Note: Shochiku Co. and the Japanese Movie Database list 15 December 1946 as release date, Kinenote 17 December 1946.)
- Running time: 95 minutes (Note: Both the Japanese Movie Database and the Kinenote website list a running time of 74 minutes. Contrary to this, the National Film Archive of Japan gives a running time of 95 minutes, which is identical with the running time of the Blu-ray version released by Artificial Eye in 2012.)
- Country: Japan
- Language: Japanese

Utamaro and His Five Women a.k.a. Five Women Around Utamaro (Japanese: 歌麿をめぐる五人の女, Hepburn: Utamaro o meguru gonin no onna) is a 1946 Japanese historical drama film directed by Kenji Mizoguchi. It is based on the novel of the same title by Kanji Kunieda, itself a fictionalized account of the life of famous printmaker Kitagawa Utamaro. It received positive reviews from critics.

== Synopsis ==
Edo (now Tōkyō) in the 18th century. During a parade of samurai and their families and concubines, Seinosuke Koide, a samurai and artist affiliated to a Kanō school master, visits a print shop where he sees a woodcut print by Utamaro that boasts the superiority of his ukiyo-e style over the prevailing Chinese style. Enraged, he goes searching for Utamaro, announcing to teach him a lesson or even kill him. Utamaro, although having been warned, meets Koide in a tea-house where he proposes a painting contest instead of a samurai-like sword duel, to which his pursuer agrees. Koide subsequently acknowledges Utamaro's superiority and declares him the winner, following him as a disciple.

Utamaro hears that Edo's best tattoo artist lacks the confidence to draw on the back of courtesan Orui, who is famous for her beauty. He asks her permission to paint directly onto her back for the tattoo artist to then tattoo over, which she proudly accepts. Shozaburo, son of a wholesaler, falls in love with Orui and elopes with her to the countryside, leaving behind his fiancée Okita, who was once a model for Utamaro.

Utamaro goes to a lake-side with his friends and spies Oran, the beautiful daughter of a commoner, amongst a group of bathing girls. He takes her to be his new model. Later, he is sentenced to 50 days in handcuffs for a series of prints which offended the officials.

Okita tracks down Shozaburo and Orui and takes him back to Edo, but later discovers he is still seeing Orui. She stabs both to death, then goes to Utamaro's house explaining that, although she knows she will face capital punishment for the crime, she had to be true to her own feelings. Utamaro has eventually his handcuffs removed and instantly returns to drawing. The film ends with a collection of his most famous prints falling one by one in front of the camera.

== Cast ==
- Minosuke Bandō – Utamaro
- Kōtarō Bandō – Seinosuke Koide
- Shotaro Nakamura – Shozaburo
- Kinuyo Tanaka – Okita, Shozaburo's fiancée
- Eiko Ohara – Yukie, Seinosuke's fiancée
- Toshiko Iizuka – Orui, the tattooed courtesan (aka Tagasode)
- Hiroko Kawasaki – Oran, the daughter of a commoner
- Kiniko Shiratao – Oshin, the brothel keeper

== Background ==
Utamaro and His Five Women was made during the seven-year Allied occupation of Japan which followed World War II and capitulation of Japan. At the time, film production was overseen by representatives of the occupation forces, and jidaigeki (period films) were rarely made, as they were seen as being inherently nationalistic or militaristic. In order to receive a permit to make the film, Mizoguchi argued that Utamaro was "a popular democratic painter" and agreed to emphasize the topic of female emancipation.

Though Utamaro and His Five Women is based on the life of Kitagawa Utamaro, it has frequently been viewed as an autobiographical work by critics. In her 2003 article for Senses of Cinema, Freda Freiberg wrote: "The equation Utamaro=Mizoguchi has been irresistible to most critics as the two artists did have a lot in common. Both of them worked in a popular mass-produced medium operated by businessmen, and chafed under oppressive censorship regimes; both frequented the pleasure quarters and sought the company of geishas; but, most significantly, they both achieved fame for their portraits of women."

== Critical reception ==
On the review aggregator website Rotten Tomatoes, 100% of 7 critics' reviews are positive.

Initially, Japanese critics believed that the film didn't live up to the director's usual high standards, an opinion which was in parts re-evaluated in later years. Film scholar Alexander Jacoby called it the "mellowest work" the director made during the Occupation years. In his review for Time Out, Tony Rayns rated it as "less emotional, more formalised, more mysterious, and a great deal more daring aesthetically" than Mizoguchi's later films.

Jonathan Rosenbaum wrote of the film, "Commonly regarded as a minor work, Five Women Around Utamaro--which is known under the rather misleading and offensive title Utamaro and His Five Women in the U.S.--offers, in fact, a highly complex reflection on the director's art." Richard Brody, in a review for The New Yorker, gave a positive assessment of the film, writing, "Fusing the movie's personal element with its analytical one, Mizoguchi attempts to resolve the apparent conflict of filming according to his own stringent artistic sensibility while documenting an essentially political question that he found deeply troubling."

In 2020, Sight & Sound listed Utamaro and His Five Women as the best Japanese film of 1946.

== See also ==
- Kōmei Bijin Rokkasen, a series of prints by Utamaro depicting women of Edo's pleasure district
