= Tazuko Sakane =

Japanese film director

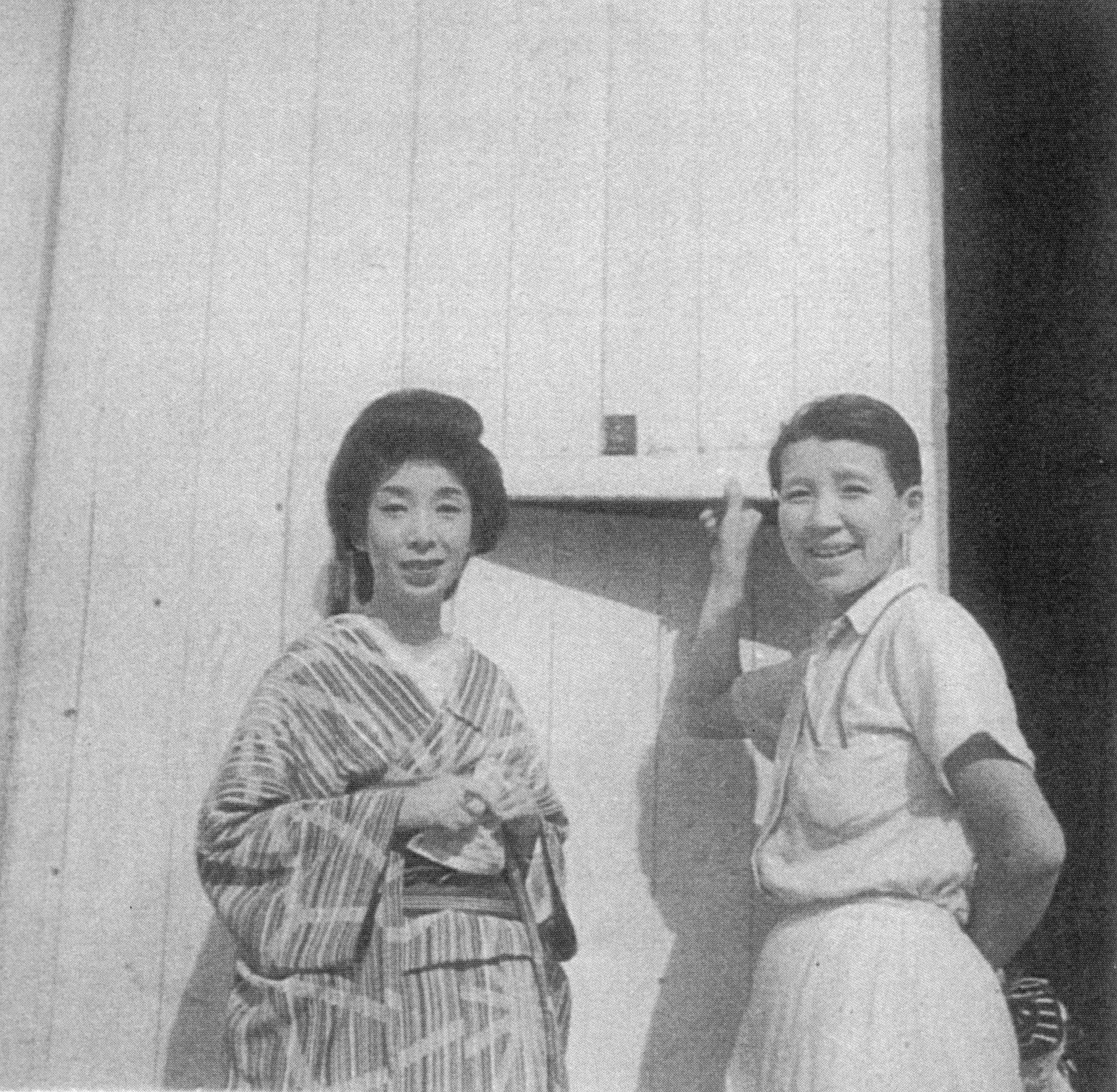
- Yoko Umemura and Tazuko Sakane
- Born: December 7, 1904; Kyoto, Japan
- Died: September 2, 1975 (aged 70); Japan
- Occupations: Director, Assistant Director, Editor, Screenwriter, Script Supervisor
- Years active: 1930-1962

Tazuko Sakane (坂根 田鶴子, Sakane Tazuko; December 7, 1904 – September 2, 1975) was a Japanese film director. She was Japan's first female director, followed by Kinuyo Tanaka. Her first feature film New Clothing (初姿 Hatsu Sugata, 1936) is known to be the first Japanese feature film directed by a woman. The majority of her films are educational nonfiction films produced by Manchukuo Film Association for Japanese immigrants and Manchu in Manchukuo. Her only known surviving film is Brides on the Frontier (開拓の花嫁 Kaitaku no Hanayome, 1943). She worked closely with Japanese Director Kenji Mizoguchi and was credited as an Editor and/or Assistant Director for over 15 films directed by him. While growing up, her father, a wealthy businessman, often took her to the cinema. She graduated from Nikkatsu Uzumaki Girls' School in 1929.

== Personal life ==
Tazuko Sakane was born on December 7, 1904 (Meiji 37) as the eldest daughter of six siblings between her father, Seiichi Sakane (坂根清一), and her mother, Shige (志げ), in the Kamigyo-ku section of Kyoto. Her mother had been born into the “Sakuma” family in Tango, but because there was no successor, Tazuko was registered as the patriarch of the Sakuma family at the age of two and became Tazuko Sakumada. However, Tazuko continued to use her paternal last name, “Sakane,” throughout her life.

Of the six children of the couple, only the eldest son, Akira, and the eldest daughter, Tazuko, lived long. The family was wealthy because her father made an invention, and Tazuko progressed from Imadegawa Kindergarten (今出川幼稚園) to Nakadachiuri Elementary School (中立売小学校) and Kyoto Prefectural First Girls' High School (京都府立京都第一高等女学校, currently Kyoto Prefectural Kamoen High School 京都府立鴨沂高等学校). The school, called “Fuichi”(府一), was a prestigious school in Kyoto. After graduation, she went to Doshisha Women's College English Department (同志社女子専門学校英文科, currently Doshisha Women's University 同志社女子大学) to continue her studies.

In 1923, Tazuko dropped out of school for reason of “convenient to do housework”, and in March of the following year, her mother died suddenly at the age of 47. Soon after, her father remarried a woman named Daisetsu Tsuru. In line with the marriage recommended by her late mother, Tazuko met with an obstetrician and gynecologist named Takaoka and married in 1925 at the age of 21. However, this marriage did not go well. Tazuko left the house and returned to her parents’ home. All eyes looked coldly at Tazuko, so she determined to be self-reliant. Aspiring to the film industry, she was introduced by her father in 1929 as a director's assistant at Nikkatsu Dazai Photo Studio. Therefore, replacing her predecessor, Mitsue Goda (合田光枝, sister of actress Hara Setsuko 原節子), Tazuko worked for the director Kenji Mizoguchi (溝口健二), and obtained the friendship of Mrs. Kenji and Chieko (Chieko's real name: Kane Tajima 田島かね). Since then, Tazuko became involved in making movies as a member of Mizoguchi group and learned practical matters.

When Mizoguchi left Nikkatsu in 1932 and moved to the Shinko Kinema (新興キネマ), Tazuko was also invited to move to the company and followed him. This was common at the time due to the movie industry having strong apprenticeship. Mizoguchi then made “Taki no Shiraito” (1933, 滝の白糸), “Gion Festival” (1933, 祇園祭), and “Kanfuren” (1934, 神風連), where Tazuko helped him as a director's assistant. In 1933, Irie Pro, who co-produced “Taki no Shiraito”, asked Tazuko to try to supervise, but in the end it didn't happen. In 1934, Mizoguchi moved to Tokyo with Tazuko and joined Nikkatsu Tamagawa Photo Studio (日活多摩川撮影所). Around this time, Tazuko asked again for the promotion of the director, but the reaction of the staff was so cold that it was not realized. It said that Tazuko was planning to make a movie for Uncle Ashiaga (足長おじさん). Tazuko disappointedly returned to Kyoto on the invitation by Mizoguchi and joined the first movie he was making. Tazuko started living near her father in Kyoto, and served as assistant director under Mizoguchi for “Otsukuru Osen” (折鶴お千), “Maria no Yuki” (マリヤのお雪), and “Koujaku Grass” (虞美人草, all in 1935).

32-year-old Tazuko asked for the promotion of the director again. This was finally realized, and she decided to make Kosugi Tenga's original “First Appearance” (初すがた Hatsu Sugata) into a movie. “First Appearance” was written by Haruo Takayanagi and Tazuko brought that out. Mizoguchi also put his name to this work as a director guidance. The cast consisted of Ichiro Tsukita and Chiyoko Okura. The movie was completed and released on March 5, 1936. In this way, Tazuko Sakane became the first Japanese female film director. Although “First Appearance” was not successful monetarily and did not receive a good reputation from critics, Tazuko did not give up and continued to make movies with Mizoguchi.

In those days when the movie industry was prosperous and human resources were flowing, Mizoguchi left the first movie, whose management situation deteriorated, and moved to the Shinko Kinema, Kamo Matsu Takeshita studio. Tazuko followed him, and produced the “Rokugiku Monogatari” (1940, 残菊物語) and “Naniwa Onna” (1940, 浪花女). Mina Miguchi cast Kinuyo Tanaka for the first time in “Naniwa Onna”. Since then, they produced excellent works in combination. Kinuyo later became the second female film director in Japan. Around this time, Tazuko began to feel the distance to Mizoguchi, and she wanted to start directing again, She received Mizoguchi's recommendation and joined Riken Kagaku Film Co., Ltd (理研科学映画株式会社). She went to Hokkaido and filmed the documentary “North Brotherhood” (1941, 北の同胞) on the theme of Ainu life.

Around this time, Mizoguchi's wife, Chieko, who had a close relationship with Tazuko, had a mental disorder and was admitted to Kyoto Prefectural Hospital. On the day of Chieko's hospitalization, Mizoguchi went to the studio and continued to work, and the staff who were shocked. Mizoguchi proposed to Tazuko during the time of Chieko's hospitalization, but she did not accept. In 1942, Tazuko joined the Keimin Movie Club (啓民映画部) of the Manchu Film Association (満洲映画協会) in Manchuria.

After arriving in Shinkyo and making a work called “Hardworking Women” (勤労の女性), Tazuko continued to make “Healthy Small National” (健康の小国民), “Bride of Pioneer” (開拓の花嫁), “Vegetable Storage” (野菜の貯蔵), “How to Burn the Heating Room” (暖房の焚き方), etc. While Japan was fighting in World War II, Tazuko finished “Indoor Horticulture” (室内園芸), “Spring Gardening” (春の園芸), “First Aid” (救急ノ基本), “Basic Emergency Aid” (基本救急法) and so on. However, on August 15, 1945, Japan surrendered unconditionally, and on August 20, the Soviet army arrived in Shinkyo. The Manchu Film Association was confiscated by the Soviet army, with no plans to return to Japan. Part of the staff, including Tazuko, was hired by Tohoku Denki Co., Ltd. (東北電影公司) by the Eight Route Army in exchange for the Soviet Army. She was allowed to return to Japan in August 1946, and on October 21 of the same year, she and 50 other Japanese stepped through Japan from Shinkyo to Jinzhou.

Returning to her parents’ home in Kyoto, Tazuko visited Mizoguchi at Shimokamo Photo Studio (加茂撮影所). Mizoguchi did not know who she was for a moment. Although surprised by her transformation, Mizoguchi brought Tazuko to Shochiku (松竹) again. However, Tazuko was unable to join as director assistant due to the struggle of power in Shochiku and was hired as a recording staff in the editorial department. Even for Mizoguchi, who had a deep relationship with actress Kinuyo Tanaka, while Chieko's younger brother's wife was a de facto wife, Tazuko was already a past existence and more than just a clerk.

Mizoguchi, who had not had much success with his films for a long time, revived with the hit of “Women of the Night” (夜の女たち, 1948). In 1952, “Nishitsuru Ichijo”(西鶴一代女), filmed with Kinuyo, won the director's award at the Venice International Film Festival and immediately pushed Mizoguchi into a master of the world. Kinuyo entered the supervisory business and directed “Koibumi” (恋文, 1953) for the first time. It had been 15 years since Tazuko's directoral debut of “First Appearance." Mizoguchi continued to receive high acclaim for “Ugetsu Monogatari” (雨月物語, 1953), “Sansho the Bailiff” (山椒大夫, 1954), “Yang Guifei” (楊貴妃, 1955), and “New Heike Monogatari” (新·平家物語, 1955). He died of myeloid leukemia on August 24, 1956.

After leaving Shochiku Kyoto Studio(松竹京都撮影所) in 1962 at 58, Tazuko continued to be involved in movies in the form of part-time jobs until 1970 and died of gastric cancer on September 2, 1975 at the age of 71. She appeared as a collaborator in the documentary film “Record of the life of a movie director Kenji Mizoguchi”(ある映画監督の生涯 溝口健二の記録) that was released about four months before her death.

== Legacy ==
Before the 1980s, the gender inequality in Japan and hierarchical corporate structure of the major studios were a barrier to women entering the industry in a creative capacity, with the scant handful of those who did directly hailing from an acting background, barring the exception of Japan's first woman director, Tazuko Sakane, who made one feature, 1936's "Hatsu Sugata". Unfortunately, no prints of the film remain.

The first Japanese women to make films came from the circles around the well-known male director, Kenji Mizoguchi, whose many films tended to center on heroines. Mizoguchi and his films about suffering women connect with current discussions about “women's directors” and women directors. When dealing with the patriarchal nature of national cinemas at the time, questions arise with Mizoguchi's unmentioned (in the text) relationship with Sakane. Under his patronage, Sakane became Japan's first and only female film director in the pre-war period. Denied work after the war (on the ground that she had to have a college degree to be a director), she was forced at age forty-two to return to Mizoguchi as his script woman.

Her surviving production memos, scripts, and correspondence were donated to the Museum of Kyoto in 2004 in commemoration of the centennial of her birth. In the Sakane collection's file for The Downfall of Osen, roughly half of her records and Mizoguchi's one-page scribble of the sequence order survive.

Situated as a minority in the film industry, Sakane was nevertheless a privileged majority member of wartime society as a Japanese national and as a person who had some control over the mass media.

== Style and influence ==
A large part of Sakane's experience with filmmaking came from assisting and editing films under the tutelage of Kenji Mizoguchi. As a woman, she was very rarely taken seriously and often belittled by the men who dominated the industry. Her first attempt at becoming a director was overshadowed by rumors established by colleagues who had assumed the only way she could have made this promotion possible was through "having an affair with Mizoguchi" and so Sakane's petition for promotion was eventually rejected. Similar to this experience, Sakane fell under scrutiny following her first film as a director, New Clothing(1936), in which her personal life, including intimate topics such as her virginity, was publicly criticized and shamed in an article merely in the studio's effort to gain attention.

Adhering to colonial standards was Sakane's only choice in order to regain her position as a director in Japan. In doing so, she left Mizoguchi and began a project, Fellow Citizens in North(1941), under the Tokyo Riken Film Company. Despite being enlisted as a director in an effort to create a propagandic film that documented Japan and assertion that the country was "one nation, one people," Sakane's personal intentions interfered. Due to wanting to maintain her personal style in spite of the colonialist assignment, Sakane created a film that documented the loss of history and native culture within Japan. However, she was made to fix and reshoot in order to create a film that met colonialist standards. Sakane never allowed political affiliations or war to affect how she filmed within these topics as a filmmaker. She merely used these situations as a means of establishing herself as a filmmaker.

It wasn't until Japan fell into war that Sakane found herself developing a sense of personal filming style that was not under the control of the studios she worked under. Due to the patriarchal restrictions of Japan that were tightening up with to the war, Sakane transferred over to the Manchuria Film Association in 1942. It was there that a majority of Sakane's films were focused on providing educational material for female audiences that didn't exist prior to her directorial debut. Despite having arrived in the association as an editor, it was under the belief that only women can direct for women that she returned to that role. Sakane stated in an interview that "given the necessity to make films for women in the Co-Prosperity Sphere and that only women can make films for themselves, I was promoted again to director." It was here that her style became evident in reestablishing what exactly domestic relationships looked like and how women existed alongside men in Japanese and Chinese society.

== Filmography ==
=== Director ===
Sakane directed a total of one feature film and 14 nonfiction films, including:

Year	Original title	English title	Notes
1936	初姿 Hatsu Sugata	New Clothing	Japan's first feature film directed by a female. The film was about the naïve, premature emotions between a young geisha-to-be and a youth destined for Buddhist priesthood; it concluded with their separation. It was not a box office success, and Sakane never had a chance to direct a feature film again.
1942	こども満州 Kodomo Manshū	Monthly Children in Manchuria, Episodes 19, 20, and 21	Sakane moved to Manchukuo to join the Manchukuo Film Association in 1942, where majority of her non-fiction films were produced. There were three departments in the Association that each produced entertainment films, educational films, and news. She Joined the educational film department.
1942	こども満州 Kodomo Manshū	Monthly Children in Manchuria	
1942	労働的女性 ōdōteki josei	Working Women	
1942	健康的小国民 Kenkōteki shōkokumin	Healthy Little National Subjects	
1943	開拓の花嫁 Kaitaku no Hanayome	Brides on the Frontier	Produced by the Manchukuo Film Association. A propaganda film to encourage Japanese young woman to move to Manchuria to become the wives of Japanese emigrants, so-called brides of the Continent. Villagers played roles different from their actual lives; single women from "school of training future brides" were recruited to act in the film. It is her only film to be extant.
1943	野菜の貯蔵 Yasai no chozō	Essential Life Knowledge series, The Preservation of Vegetables.	Essential life knowledge series provided essential knowledge of everyday targeted particularly for woman in Manchukuo. It was created in both Japanese and Manchurian versions.
1943	暖房の焚き方Danbō no tatakikata	Essential Life Knowledge series, How to Set the Heater	
1944	室内園芸 Shitunai engei	Essential Life Knowledge series, Indoor Gardening	
1944	春天的園芸 Shunten teki engei	Essential Life Knowledge series, Gardening in Spring	
1944	救急法ノ基本 Kyukyuhō no kihō	Basics of Emergency Care	Military Edition, Commissioned by the Kwantung Army
1944	救急基本法Kyukyu kihonhō	Basics of Emergency Care	Popular Edition

=== Assistant Director/Second Unit Director ===
Sakane worked as assistant director for the following films:

Year	Original title	English title	Director	Credits
1930	唐人お吉 Tojin Okichi	Mistress of a Foreigner	Kenji Mizoguchi	Assistant Director
1931	しかも彼等は行く Shikamo Karera wa Yuku	And Yet They Go On	Kenji Mizoguchi	Assistant Director
1932	時の氏神 Toki no Ujigami	The Man of the Moment/Timely Mediator	Kenji Mizoguchi	Assistant Director
1933	祇園祭 Gion Matsuri	Gion Festival	Kenji Mizoguchi	Assistant Director
1934	神風連 Jinpu-ren (Shimpu-ren)	The Jinpu(Shimpu) Group	Kenji Mizoguchi	Assistant Director
1934	愛憎峠 Aizō Tōge	The Mountain Pass of Love and Hate	Kenji Mizoguchi	Assistant Director
1935	折鶴お千 Orizuru Osen	The Downfall of Osen	Kenji Mizoguchi	First Assistant Director
1935	マリアのお雪 Maria no Oyuki	Oyuki the Virgin	Kenji Mizoguchi	Assistant Director
1935	虞美人草 Gubijin-so	The Poppy	Kenji Mizoguchi	Assistant Director
1938	露営の歌 Roei no Uta	Song of the Camp	Kenji Mizoguchi	Assistant Director
1938	あゝ故郷 Aa kokyo	Ah, My Home Town	Kenji Mizoguchi	Assistant Director
1939	残菊物語 Zangiku monogatari	The Story of the Last Chrysanthemums	Kenji Mizoguchi	Assistant Director

=== Editor ===
Sakane worked as an editor on the following films:

Year	Original title	English title	Director	Credits
1933	滝の白糸 Taki no Shiraito	The Water Magician	Kenji Mizoguchi	Editor
1935	虞美人草 Gubijin-so	The Poppy	Kenji Mizoguchi	Editor
1936	浪華悲歌 Naniwa erejii	Osaka Elegy	Kenji Mizoguchi	Editor
1936	祇園の姉妹 Gion no shimai	Sisters of the Gion	Kenji Mizoguchi	Editor
1937	愛怨峡 Aien kyō	The Straits of Love and Hate	Kenji Mizoguchi	Editor
1948	夜の女たち Yoru no onnatachi	Women of the Night	Kenji Mizoguchi	Editor

== Bibliography or further reading ==
- Daniels, Gordon (2005). Hiroko Tomida (ed.). Japanese women : emerging from subservience, 1868–1945. Folkestone, Kent: Global Oriental. ISBN 1901903184.
- Nelmes, Jill, and Jule Selbo. Women Screenwriters: an International Guide. Palgrave Macmillan, 2018. ISBN 978-1-137-31237-2
- Gonzalez-Lopez, Irene. Tanaka Kinuyo: Nation, Stardom and Female Subjectivity. Edinburgh University Press, 2017. ISBN 978-1474409698
- Ikegawa, Reiko. Sakane Tazuko, Director of the Empire: Brides of the Frontier, 1943, Man’ei/Teikoku no Eiga Kantoku Sakane Tazuko: “Kaitaku no hanayome,”1943-nen, Man'ei. Tokyo: Yoshikawa Kōbunkan, 2011.
- Ikegawa, Reiko and Julian Ward. “Japanese Women Filmmakers in World War II: A Study of Sakane Tazuko, Suzuki Noriko and Atsugi Taka.” In Japanese Women Emerging from Subservience, 1868-1945. Eds. Gordon Daniels and Hiroko Tomida. Folkestone, UK: Global Oriental, 2005. 258-277.
- McDonald, Keiko. “Daring To Be First: The Japanese Woman Director Tazuko Sakane (1904-1971).” Asian Cinema vol. 18, no. 2 (2007): 128-46.
- Morimoto, Maries Thorsten. “The ‘Peace Dividend’ in Japanese Cinema.” In Colonialism and Nationalism in Asian Cinema. Ed. Wimal Dissanayake. Indiana University Press, 1994. 11-29.
- Ōnishi, Etsuko. The Woman Who Loved Mizoguchi Kenji: Life of the First Female Director Sakane Tazuko/Mizoguchi Kenji o aishita onna: jōryū eiga kantoku dai ichi-gō, Sakane Tazuko no shōgai. Tokyo: San’ichi Shobō, 1993.
- Zhao, Xinyi. “So Queer Yet So Straight: Japan’s First Female Director(s).” Conference paper, Women and the Silent Screen IX, Shanghai, June 16-18, 2017.

== See also ==
- Kenji Mizoguchi Japanese film director
- Kinuyo Tanaka Japan's second woman director
