= Yoko Umemura =

Japanese actress

Yôko Umemura
- 梅村蓉子
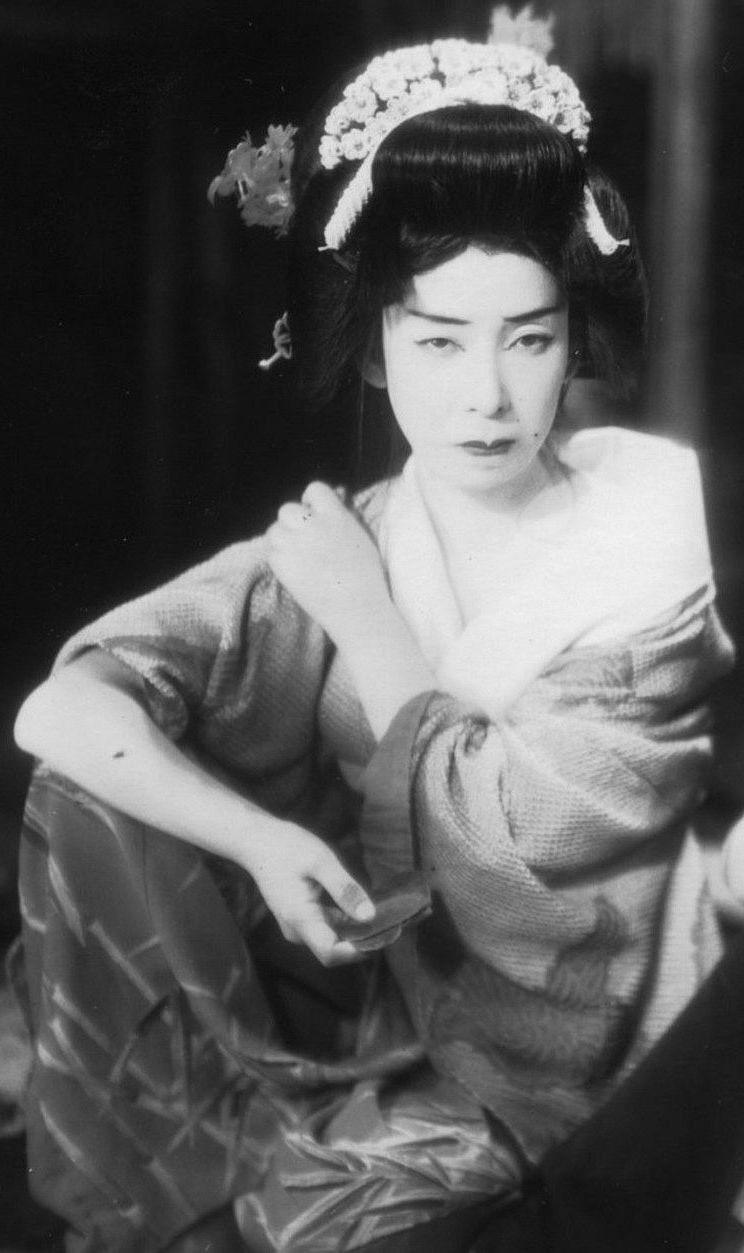
- Umemura in 1935
- Born: Suzuki Hanako; October 21, 1903; Tokyo, Japan
- Died: March 8, 1944 (aged 40); Tanba province, Japan
- Occupation: Actress

Yôko Umemura (梅村蓉子; October 21, 1903 – March 8, 1944), born Suzuki Hanako, was a Japanese film actress who appeared in over a hundred films from 1922 to 1944. She is especially associated with the work of directors Yasujiro Shimazu and Kenji Mizoguchi.

== Early life and education ==
Umemura was born in Nihonbashi, Tokyo. She began her stage career as a child.

== Career ==
Umemura was a film star in Japan, compared to Norma Talmadge in the 1920s. She made the transition to sound pictures and co-starred as a geisha in Kenji Mizoguchi's drama Sisters of the Gion (1936), and in Mizoguchi's The Story of the Last Chrysanthemums (1939). Other directors she worked with included Tomotaka Tasaka, Mansaku Itami, Minoru Murata, Daisuke Ito, Yutaka Abe, and Yasujiro Shimazu. In 1931 she was said to be Japan's highest salaried film actress.

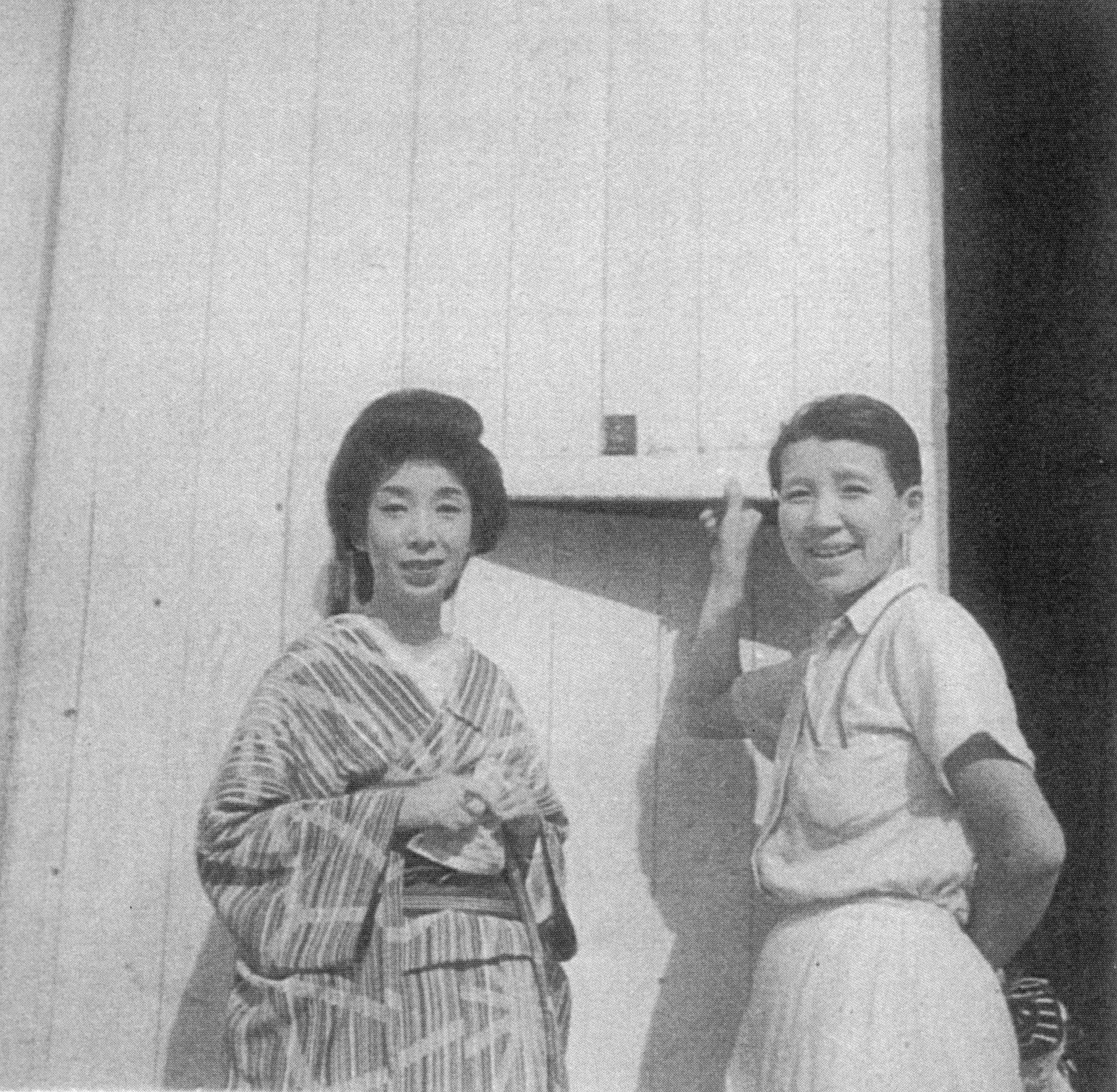
Yoko Umemura and director Tazuko Sakane, in the 1930s

== Selected filmography ==
Umemura appeared in over a hundred films between 1922 and 1944.

- Minoya no musume (1924)
- Kyôrakûsha (1924)
- Kaichô-on (1924)
- Daichi wa hohoemu (1925)
- Akai yûhi ni teresarete (1925)
- Kaminingyô no haru no sasayaki (1926)
- Ashi ni sawatta onna (1926)
- Kujaku no hikari (1926)
- Five Women Around Him (1927)
- Shinpa Ôoka seidan (1928)
- Nihonbashi (1929)
- Aa mujô (1929)
- Tôjin Okichi (1930)
- Shanghai (1932)
- Oyuki the Virgin (1935)
- Ojô Okichi (1935)
- Poppy (1935)
- Osaka Elegy (1936)
- Capricious Young Man (1936)
- Akanishi Kakita (1936)
- Sisters of the Gion (1936)
- Yoshida Palace (1937)
- The Story of the Last Chrysanthemums (1939)
- Osaka Woman (1940)
- The Life of an Actor (1941)
- Ômura Masujirô (1942)
- Yamasandô (1942)
- Kaigun (1943)
- Kikuchi sembon-yari (1944)

== Personal life ==
Umemura died in 1944, at the age of 40, when her appendix burst at a film location in Tanba Province.
