= The Morning Sun Shines =

1929 Kenji Mizoguchi film

- Directed by: Kenji Mizoguchi; Seiichi Ina
- Starring: Eiji Nakano; Hirotoshi Murata; Heitarō Doi; Ranko Sawa; Irie Takako
- Cinematography: Tatsuyuki Yokota; Torao Taishima
- Production company: Nikkatsu
- Release date: 12 April 1929 (Japan)
- Running time: 2,099 meters
- Country: Japan
- Language: Japanese

Surviving footage from The Morning Sun Shines

The Morning Sun Shines (朝日は輝く, Asahi wa kagayaku) is a 1929 Japanese film directed by Kenji Mizoguchi and Seiichi Ina. Intended as a promotional film for the newspaper Asahi Shimbun, it combines fictional and documentary elements. Only a fragment of the film survives today.

== Cast ==
- Eiji Nakano
- Hirotoshi Murata
- Heitarō Doi
- Ranko Sawa
- Irie Takako
