= Tōjin Okichi (1930 film) =

1930 Kenji Mizoguchi film

Tōjin Okichi; 唐人お吉
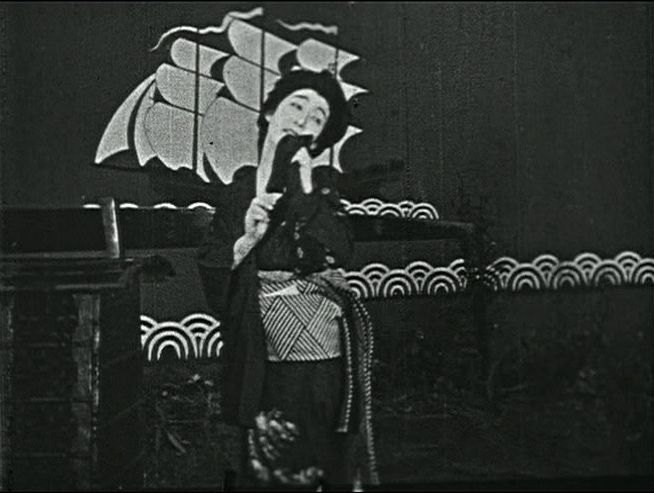
- Yōko Umemura
- Directed by: Kenji Mizoguchi
- Written by: Shuichi Hatamoto (screenplay); Gisaburō Jūichiya (novel)
- Starring: Kaichi Yamamoto; Yōko Umemura; Kōji Shima; Takihika Hisako
- Cinematography: Tatsuyuki Yokota; Saburo Isayama
- Production company: Nikkatsu
- Distributed by: Nikkatsu
- Release date: 1 July 1930 (Japan)
- Running time: 3,152 meters
- Country: Japan
- Language: Japanese

Tōjin Okichi (Japanese: 唐人お吉), a.k.a. Okichi, Mistress of a Foreigner or Mistress of a Foreigner, is a 1930 silent drama film by Kenji Mizoguchi, based on the novel by Gisaburō Jūichiya. Only a fragment of the film has known to have survived.

== Cast ==
- Kaichi Yamamoto
- Yōko Umemura
- Kōji Shima
- Takihika Hisako

== Background ==
Tazuko Sakane, who later became the first Japanese woman director, served as script assistant and assistant director on the film.

Jūichiya's novel was again adapted for film in 1937 under the title Tōjin Okichi Kurofune jōwa.

== Home media ==
A 4-minute-long sequence has been published on DVD as complement to Mizoguchi's Orizuru Osen by Digital MEME in 2007.
