= Kenji Mizoguchi: The Life of a Film Director =

1975 Japanese film

- Poster
- Kanji: ある映画監督の生涯 溝口健二の記録
- Revised Hepburn: Aru eiga-kantoku no shōgai Mizoguchi Kenji no kiroku
- Directed by: Kaneto Shindō
- Written by: Kaneto Shindō
- Produced by: Kaneto Shindō
- Narrated by: Kaneto Shindō
- Cinematography: Yoshiyuki Miyake
- Edited by: Mitsuo Kondo; Keiko Fujita
- Production company: Kindai Eiga Kyōkai
- Distributed by: Art Theatre Guild
- Release date: 24 May 1975 (Japan)
- Running time: 150 minutes
- Country: Japan
- Language: Japanese

Kenji Mizoguchi: The Life of a Film Director (Japanese: ある映画監督の生涯 溝口健二の記録, Hepburn: Aru Eiga-kantoku no Shōgai Mizoguchi Kenji no Kiroku) is a 1975 Japanese documentary film on the life and works of director Kenji Mizoguchi. It was produced, written and directed by Kaneto Shindō.

== Synopsis ==
In 39 interviews with actors and actresses, writers, producers and staff members, interspersed with film excerpts and stills, Shindō recounts the life and career of his friend and mentor Mizoguchi.

Interviewees

- Masaichi Nagata
- Takako Irie
- Masashige Narusawa
- Eijirō Yanagi
- Dai Arakawa
- Machiko Kyō
- Matsuji Ohno
- Eitaro Ozawa
- Gengo Ohto
- Eitarō Shindō
- Kakuko Mori
- Kumeko Urabe
- Seiichiro Uchikawa
- Tazuko Sakane
- Kyōko Kagawa
- Daisuke Itō
- Motohisa Ando
- Kenichi Okamoto
- Kiyohiko Ushihara
- Tatsuo Sakai
- Eiji Nakano
- Yoshikata Yoda
- Kazuo Miyagawa
- Ayako Wakao
- Yasuzo Masumura
- Fumiko Yamaji
- Tadaoto Kainoshō
- Isuzu Yamada
- Hideo Tsumura
- Matsutarō Kawaguchi
- Toshio Itoya
- Michiyo Kogure
- Shigeru Miki
- Ganjirō Nakamura
- Kinuyo Tanaka
- Yoshikazu Hayashi
- Yoshiyuki Takatsu
- Goro Sodai
- Nobuko Otowa

== Awards ==
Kenji Mizoguchi: The Life of a Film Director received the Kinema Junpo Award for Best Film. Kaneto Shindō received the Kinema Junpo Award and the Mainichi Film Award for Best Director.

== Home media ==
The film was released on DVD in Japan in 2001. In the US, the film is included in the Criterion Collection DVD and Blu-ray release of Ugetsu (1953).
