= Osaka Elegy =

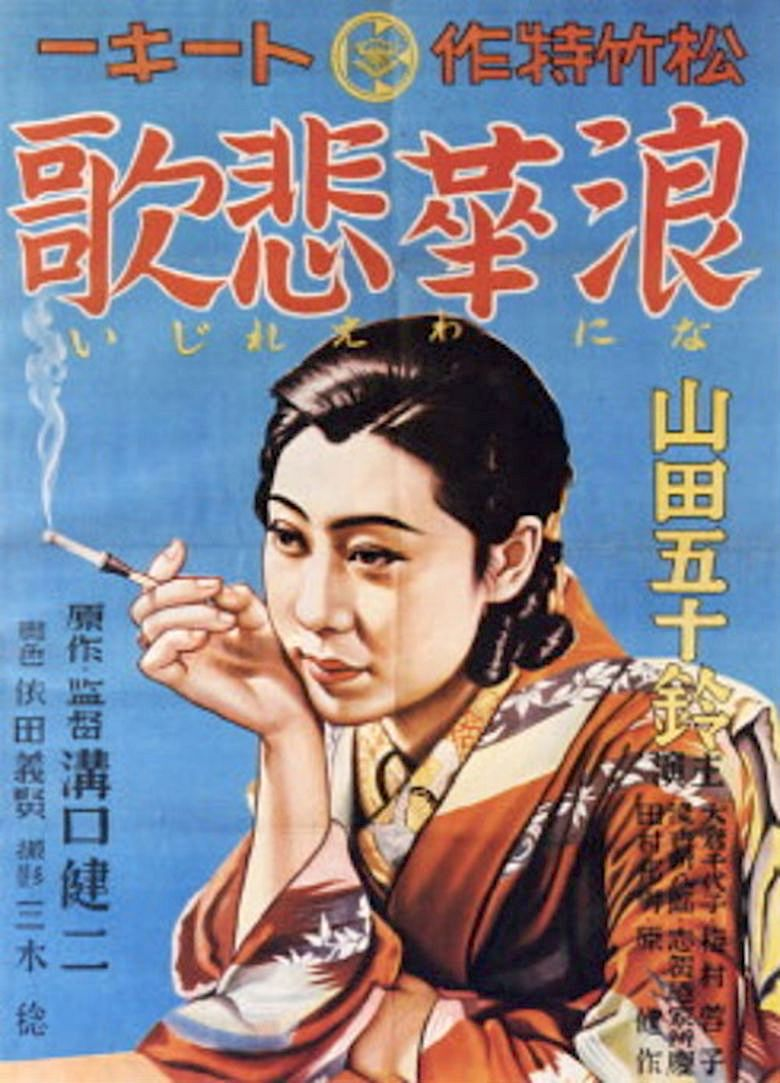
- Theatrical release poster
- Directed by: Kenji Mizoguchi
- Written by: Kenji Mizoguchi (original story); Yoshikata Yoda (screenplay)
- Based on: Mieko by Saburo Okada
- Produced by: Masaichi Nagata
- Starring: Isuzu Yamada; Seiichi Takegawa; Chiyoko Okura
- Cinematography: Minoru Miki
- Edited by: Tazuko Sakane
- Production company: Daiichi Eiga
- Distributed by: Shochiku
- Release date: 28 May 1936
- Running time: 71 minutes
- Country: Japan
- Language: Japanese

Osaka Elegy (1936) by Kenji Mizoguchi

Osaka Elegy (Japanese: 浪華悲歌, Hepburn: Naniwa Erejī; lit. "Naniwa Elegy" (Note: The original title refers to Osaka's Naniwa ward.)) is a 1936 Japanese drama film directed by Kenji Mizoguchi. It forms a diptych with Mizoguchi's Sisters of the Gion which shares much of the same cast and production team, and is considered an early masterpiece in the director's career.

== Plot ==
Sonosuke Asai, head of the Asai Drug Company, lives in an unhappy marriage with his wife Sumiko. While he treats the servants disdainfully, Sumiko reminds him that he owes his position to her family which he married into. He makes advances to one of his employees, telephone operator Ayako, which the young woman fends off. After work, Ayako discusses this with her colleague and boyfriend Susumu, complaining that he doesn't help her collect the 300 yen which her father embezzled from his employer and is forced to pay back.

After an argument with her father, who argues that he embezzled the money to finance his children's education, Ayako leaves home. She takes up Asai's offer to become his mistress, asking him in return to give her 300 yen to pay back her father's debts. She quits her job and moves into an apartment which he pays for her. When they attend a bunraku performance, they are confronted by his wife who furiously accuses Asai for having an affair. Fujino, a business acquaintance of Asai, intervenes, lying that Ayako was his date, not her husband's.

Ayako runs into Susumu in a shopping mall. Asked about her flashy appearance, she lies that she is now working in a beauty salon. When Susumu confesses that he contemplated the idea to marry her, she runs off in embarrassment. Shortly after, Sumiko shows up in Ayako's and Asai's apartment, demanding that he comes with her and puts an end to his affair. Ayako stays on living in her new home.

Ayako meets with her younger sister Sachiko. Sachiko insists that she helps raising 200 yen for their brother Hiroshi's tuition fees. Ayako acquires the money from her admirer Fujino, leaving him once he has given it to her. She then asks Susumu into her apartment, confessing everything to him and hoping they can still marry. When Fujino shows up to demand his money back, she treats him with disrespect, and he informs the police in return.

Ayako and Susumu are questioned at the police station. She overhears Susumu claim that he was dragged into the affair and never intended to marry her. As it is her first offence, she is released without charge, but into the care of her father. Back at home, Hiroshi calls Ayako a delinquent and demands that their father throws her out, while Sachiko says that she is ashamed to go to school due to the story being in all the papers. Incensed by being called a disgrace and an ingrate, Ayako leaves home again. She runs into Dr. Yoko, the physician of her former lover Asai, and asks him if there is a cure for female delinquency. He negates, and she continues on her way alone.

== Cast ==
- Isuzu Yamada as Ayako Murai
- Yoko Umemura as Sumiko Asai
- Chiyoko Okura as Sachiko Murai, Ayako's younger sister
- Shinpachiro Asaka as Hiroshi Murai, Ayako's brother
- Benkei Shiganoya as Sonosuke Asai
- Eitarō Shindō as Yoshizo Fujino
- Kunio Tamura as Dr. Yoko
- Seiichii Takekawa as Junzo Murai, Ayako's father
- Kensaku Hara as Susumu Nishimura
- Takashi Shimura as Inspector

== Background ==
Osaka Elegy was the first mutual project of Mizoguchi and Yoshikata Yoda, his regular screenwriter for years to come. After the film's success, Mizoguchi and producer Masaichi Nagata planned two films to be set in Kyōto and Kōbe, of which only the former, Sisters of the Gion, was realised due to the production company's collapse.

Mizoguchi himself cited Osaka Elegy and Sisters of the Gion as the works with which he achieved artistic maturity. Critics and film historians regard Osaka Elegy as one of Mizoguchi's "finest efforts" (Fred Camper, Chicago Reader) and "best films" (Donald Richie, Joseph L. Anderson, The Japanese Film – Art & Industry), emphasising "its visual precision and its engaged but never preachy tone" (Geoff Andrew, Time Out).
