= Eiji Nakano =

Japanese actor

- 中野英治
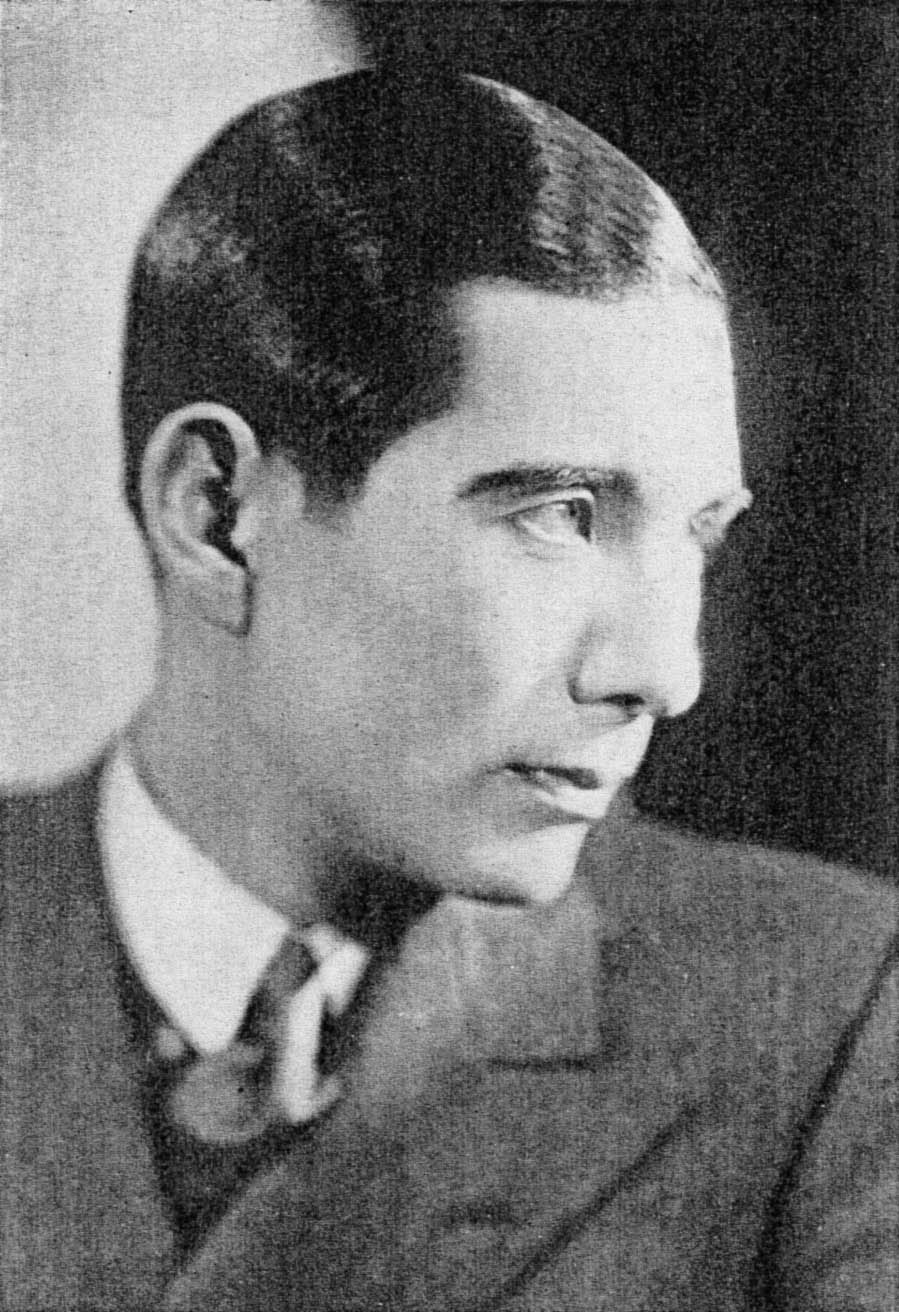
- Eiga Nakano in 1935
- Born: Eisaburō Nakano; December 5, 1904; Kure, Hiroshima, Japan
- Died: September 6, 1990 (aged 85)
- Occupation: Actor

Eiji Nakano (中野 英治, Nakano Eiji; 5 December 1904 – 6 September 1990) was a Japanese film actor.

== Career ==
Born in Hiroshima Prefecture, Nakano attended Hōsei University, but left before graduating. When he was playing for the Nikkatsu amateur baseball team, he was scouted as an actor and made his debut in 1925 in Daichi wa hohoemu. While becoming one of Japan's main romantic leads, Nakano moved from Nikkatsu to Teikoku Kinema to Shinkō Kinema to Daiichi Eiga and other studios, and starred in films directed by such masters as Kenji Mizoguchi, Tomu Uchida, Daisuke Itō, and Tomotaka Tasaka, among others. In 1941, he formed his own production company, Nakano Eiji Productions, and directed the film Shōgun. After World War II, he ceased appearing in movies until the 1970s, when he appeared in films such as Kaneto Shindo's documentary on Kenji Mizoguchi, Kenji Mizoguchi: The Life of a Film Director.

== Selected filmography ==
- Daichi wa hohoemu (1925)
- Orizuru Osen (1935)
- Shōgun (1941) (director)
- Kenji Mizoguchi: The Life of a Film Director (1975)
