= Shinkō Kinema =

Japanese film studio

Shinkō Kinema (新興キネマ) was a Japanese film studio active in the 1930s.

== History ==
Shinkō was established in 1931 out of the remnants of the Teikoku Kinema studio with the help of Shōchiku capital. According to film historian Jun'ichirō Tanaka, the studio was part of Shōchiku's effort to monopolize the Japanese film industry, using Shinkō to control some of the independent production companies by distributing their films, and absorb rebellious talents who left rivals like Nikkatsu or Fuji Eiga. Shinkō distributed the films of jidaigeki stars like Tsumasaburō Bandō and Kanjūrō Arashi or gendaigeki stars such as Takako Irie. For a time, directors such as Kenji Mizoguchi, Tomu Uchida, Minoru Murata, Shigeyoshi Suzuki, and Yutaka Abe, as well as stars like Tokihiko Okada, Isamu Kosugi, Eiji Nakano, Fumiko Yamaji and Mitsuko Mori made films at Shinkō. Masaichi Nagata became studio head at one point. Its main offices were located in Hatchōbori in Tokyo, and its studios in Uzumasa in Kyoto and Ōizumi (now in Nerima) in Tokyo.

Shinkō could not retain these talents for long and remained a second-rank studio. In the 1941 government-led reorganization of the industry, it was merged with Daito Eiga and the production arm of Nikkatsu to form Daiei Studios. The Tokyo and Kyoto studios of the Toei Company are currently located on the sites of the old Shinkō studios.

== See also ==
- Cinema of Japan
