= Minoru Miki (cinematographer) =

Japanese cinematographer

Minoru Miki (三木 稔, Miki Minoru, 26 December 1902 – 21 November 1968), also credited as Shigeto Miki (三木 滋人), was a Japanese cinematographer. He was especially known for his work on a number of films by Japanese director Kenji Mizoguchi, including Osaka Elegy and Sisters of the Gion, which were both placed among the top three films of 1936 by the Japanese magazine Kinema Junpo.
