= Kōmei Bijin Rokkasen =

Series of woodblock prints by Kitagawa Utamaro

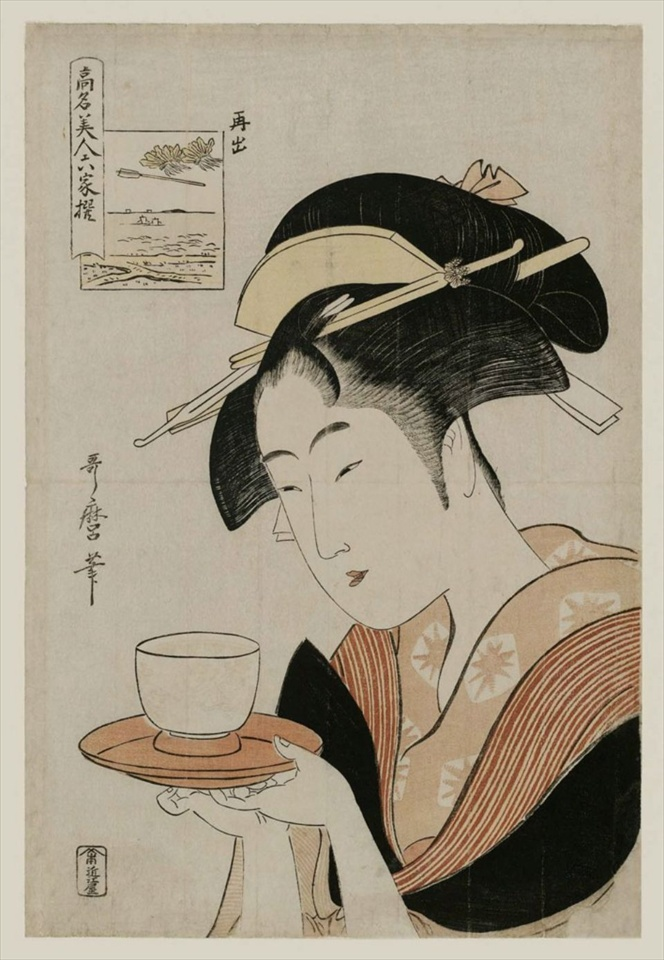
Portrait of Naniwaya O-Kita from Kōmei Bijin Rokkasen

Kōmei Bijin Rokkasen (高名美人六家撰, "Renowned Beauties from the Six Best Houses") is a series of ukiyo-e prints designed by the Japanese artist Utamaro and published in c. 1795–96. The subjects were well-known courtesans, geisha, and others associated with the Yoshiwara pleasure districts of Edo (modern Tokyo).

Due to legal restrictions, the names of the women appear do not appear in the prints. To get around this, hanji-e picture-puzzles appear in the rebus in the top corner of each print; solving them reveals the names. In 1796, the restrictions were tightened, and even the hanji-e were disallowed. Thereafter, the prints were republished as Fūryū Rokkasen (風流六歌撰, "Elegant Six Immortal Poets"), with the hanji-e replaced with pictures of the Rokkasen "Six Immortal Poets" of the 9th century.

== Background ==
Ukiyo-e art flourished in Japan during the Edo period from the 17th to 19th centuries, and took as its primary subjects courtesans, kabuki actors, and others associated with the "floating world" lifestyle of the pleasure districts. Alongside paintings, mass-produced woodblock prints were a major form of the genre. In the mid-18th century full-colour nishiki-e prints became common, printed using a large number of woodblocks, one for each colour. A prominent genre was bijin-ga ("pictures of beauties"), which depicted most often courtesans and geisha at leisure, and promoted the entertainments of the pleasure districts.

Kitagawa Utamaro (c. 1753–1806) made his name in the 1790s with his bijin ōkubi-e ("large-headed pictures of beautiful women") portraits, focusing on the head and upper torso, a style others had previously employed in portraits of kabuki actors. Utamaro experimented with line, colour, and printing techniques to bring out subtle differences in the features, expressions, and backdrops of subjects from a wide variety of class and background. Utamaro's individuated beauties were in sharp contrast to the stereotyped, idealized images that had been the norm.

== Publication ==
The six prints are multicolour nishiki-e prints in ōban size (about 38 cm × 25 cm, 15 in × 10 in). They were published in c. 1796 by Ōmiya Gonkurō. Retitled versions of the prints appeared in a later series titled Fūryū Rokkasen (風流六歌撰, "Elegant Six Immortal Poets").

== Description and analysis ==
The series depicts six well-known beauties associated with the Yoshiwara pleasure districts—courtesans, geisha, and the like. A rebus appears in the corner of each print bearing the title Kōmei Bijin Rokkasen (高名美人六家撰, "Renowned Beauties from the Six Best Houses") and a hanji-e (Note: 判じ絵 hanji-e) picture-puzzle. This was done in response to a shogunal edict of 1793 (one of the Kansei Reforms) that banned the inscription of names on ukiyo-e prints. To get around this restriction—and perhaps to add the pleasure of a puzzle for viewers to solve—Utamaro resorted to hanji-e to symbolize the name of the model. The restrictions expanded to include even these measures in 1796. (Note: This restriction came into effect in the eight month of Kansei 8 on the Japanese calendar.)

In Fūryū Rokkasen the hanji-e is replaced with the seated figure of one of the rokkasen "six poetry immortals" of the mid-9th century. Rokkasen is spelled with different kanji characters in the two series; the earlier is a parody of the latter, which is derived from the original kanji characters for the rokkasen poets. Both series were published by Ōmiya Kenkura and are signed Utamaro hitsu (歌麿筆). Estimated publication dates range from 1794 to 1798.

Other minor differences in printed copies exist—the print of O-Kita, for example, has editions with and without the seal saishutsu (再出, "re-appearance") on it, and there are editions of both Hinodeya goke and O-Hisa with eyebrows and with the eyebrows shaved off.

=== Naniwaya O-Kita ===
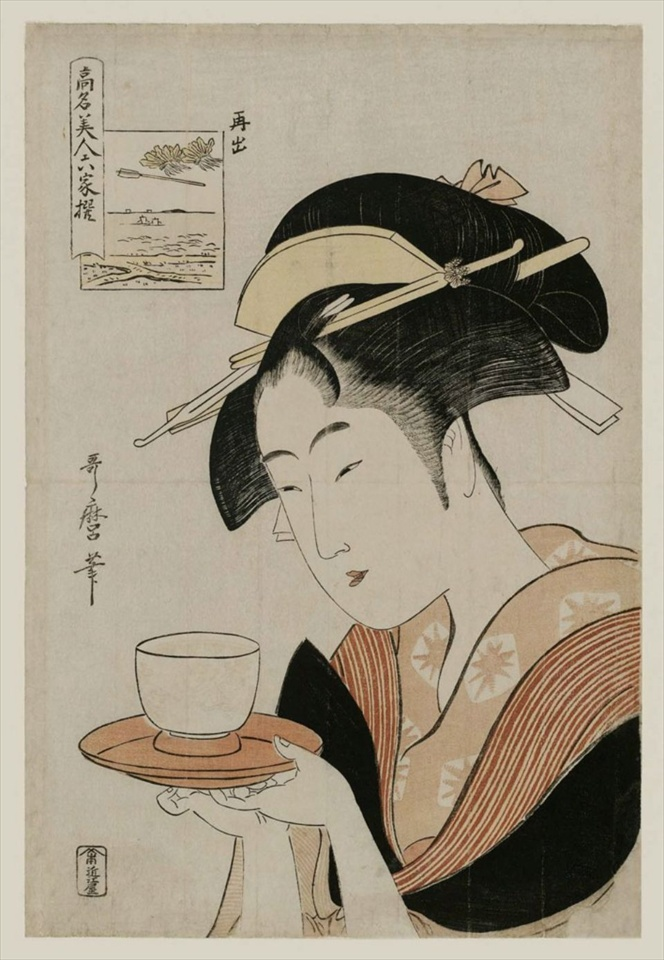
Kōmei Bijin Rokkasen version

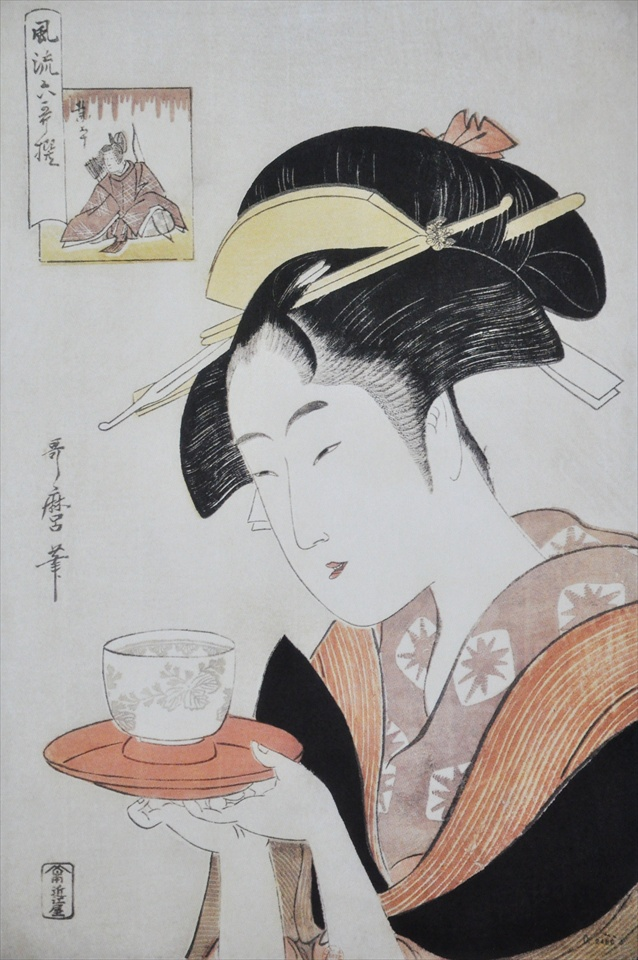
Fūryū Rokkasen version, matching O-Kita with the poet Ariwara no Narihira

Utamaro depicts the popular teahouse girl O-Kita of the Naniwaya (難波屋おきた) when she was about 18. The Naniwaya was a teahouse near Asakusa Shrine. She stands in a modest posture offering a teacup on a saucer. She wears an ornate hairpin with a paulownia blossom in it and her clothing is patterned with stylized ivy, both symbols associated with O-Kita.

O-Kita's name is deciphered from the hanji-e as follows: from top to bottom, two bunches of rapeseed (菜二把 na ni-wa; wa is a Japanese counter word for bundles), an arrow (屋, ya), the open sea offshore (沖, and a rice paddy field (田 ta). The Fūryū Rokkasen version matches O-Kita with Ariwara no Narihira. There are different interpretations for why some editions bear the seal saishutsu (再出, "re-appearance"), such as that O-Kita had withdrawn from public and made a re-appearance.

=== Tatsumi Rokō ===
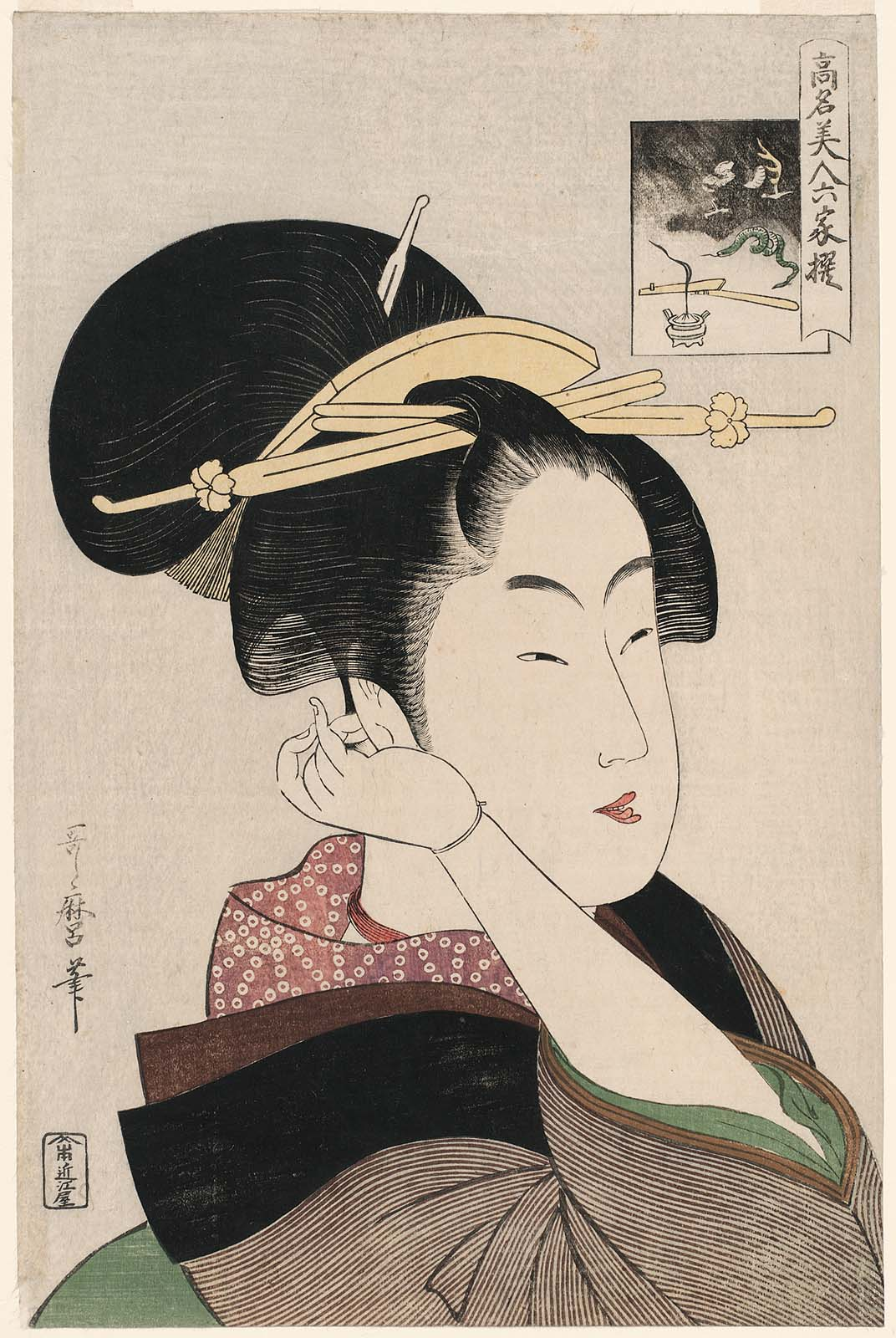
Kōmei Bijin Rokkasen version

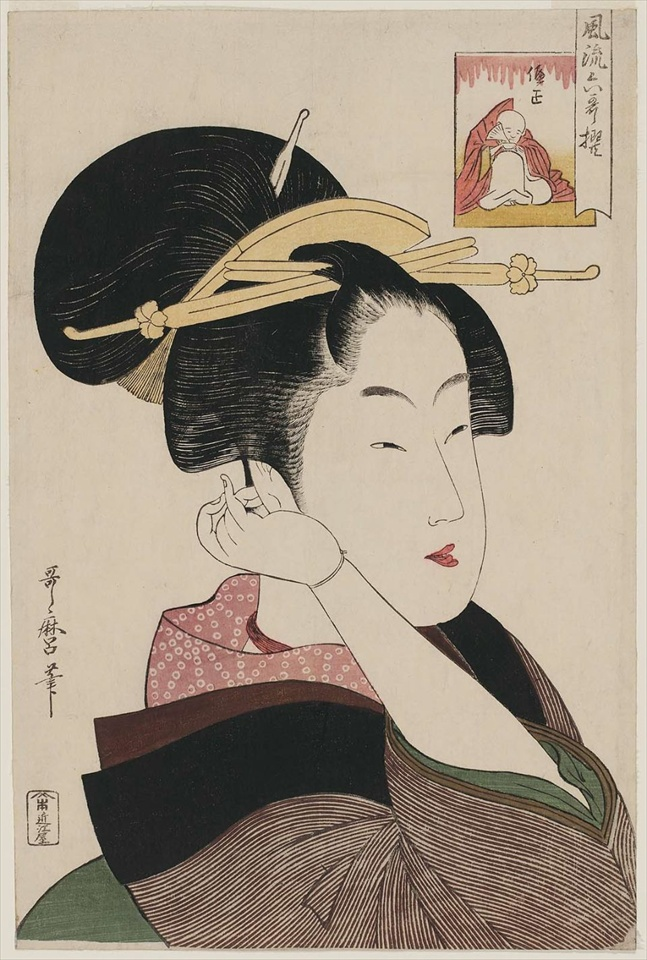
Fūryū Rokkasen version, matching Rokō with the poet Toba Sōjō

Utamaro portrays the geisha Rokō of the Tatsumi district (辰巳路考 Tatsumi Rokō). She poses with her right hand placed behind her right ear and the cord to an incense pouch is visible around her neck.

Rokō was a stage name of Segawa Kikunojō II, a kabuki actor who specialized in onnagata roles playing young women; he was so popular that some women had Rokō appended to their names. Tatsumi means "southeast" and refers to the Fukagawa area southeast of Edo Castle; Fukagawa was known for its yūkaku pleasure district. From this it is deduced that "Tatsumi Rokō" refers to a popular beauty from Fukagawa, but it is not clear who she was.

Rokō's name is deciphered from the hanji-e as follows: from top to bottom, a dragon (竜 tatsu), a snake (蛇, mi on the Chinese zodiac), a pair of rowing sculls (艪 ro), and some burning incense (香 kō). In the Fūryū Rokkasen version she is matched with the poet Sōjō Henjō.

=== Takashimaya O-Hisa ===
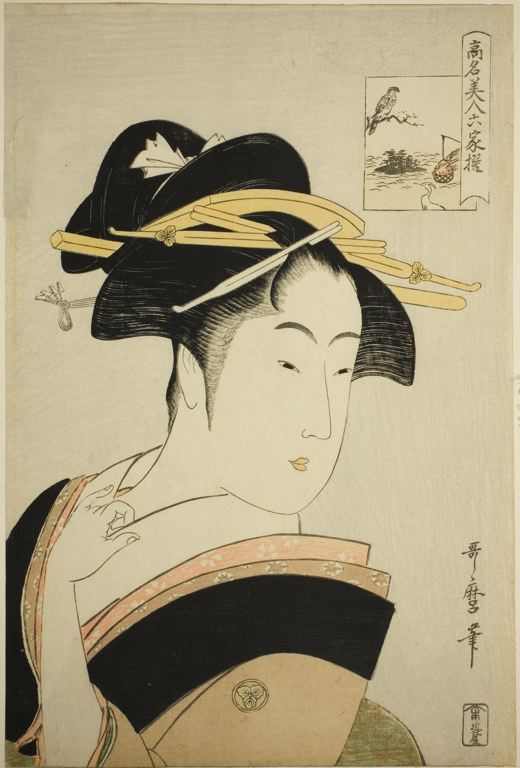
Kōmei Bijin Rokkasen version with eyebrows

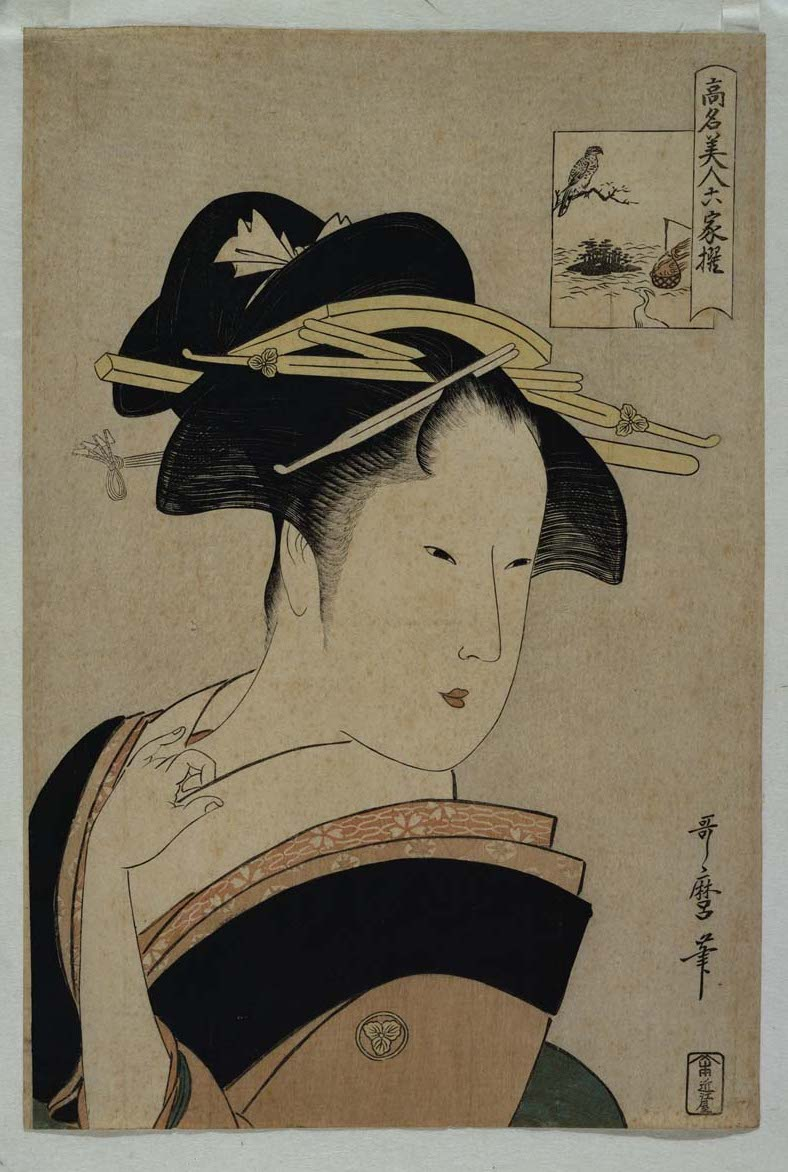
Kōmei Bijin Rokkasen version without eybrows

Utamaro depicts Takashimaya O-Hisa (高島屋おひさ), the eldest daughter of Takashima Chōbei, the owner of a roadside teahouse at his home called Senbeiya in which Hisa worked attracting customers. At the time of publication O-Hisa was about 19. Her kimono bears her three-leafed daimyo oak crest, and three daimyo oak leaves adorns her hairpin.

O-Hisa's name is deciphered from the hanji-e as follows: a perching falcon (鷹 taka), an island (島 shima), a kagaribi flare fire (火 hi, "fire"), and an egret (白鷺 shirasagi, from which sa comes from 鷺 sagi, "heron"). The Fūryū Rokkasen version matches O-Hisa with Ōtomo no Kuronushi.

=== Ōgiya Hanaōgi ===
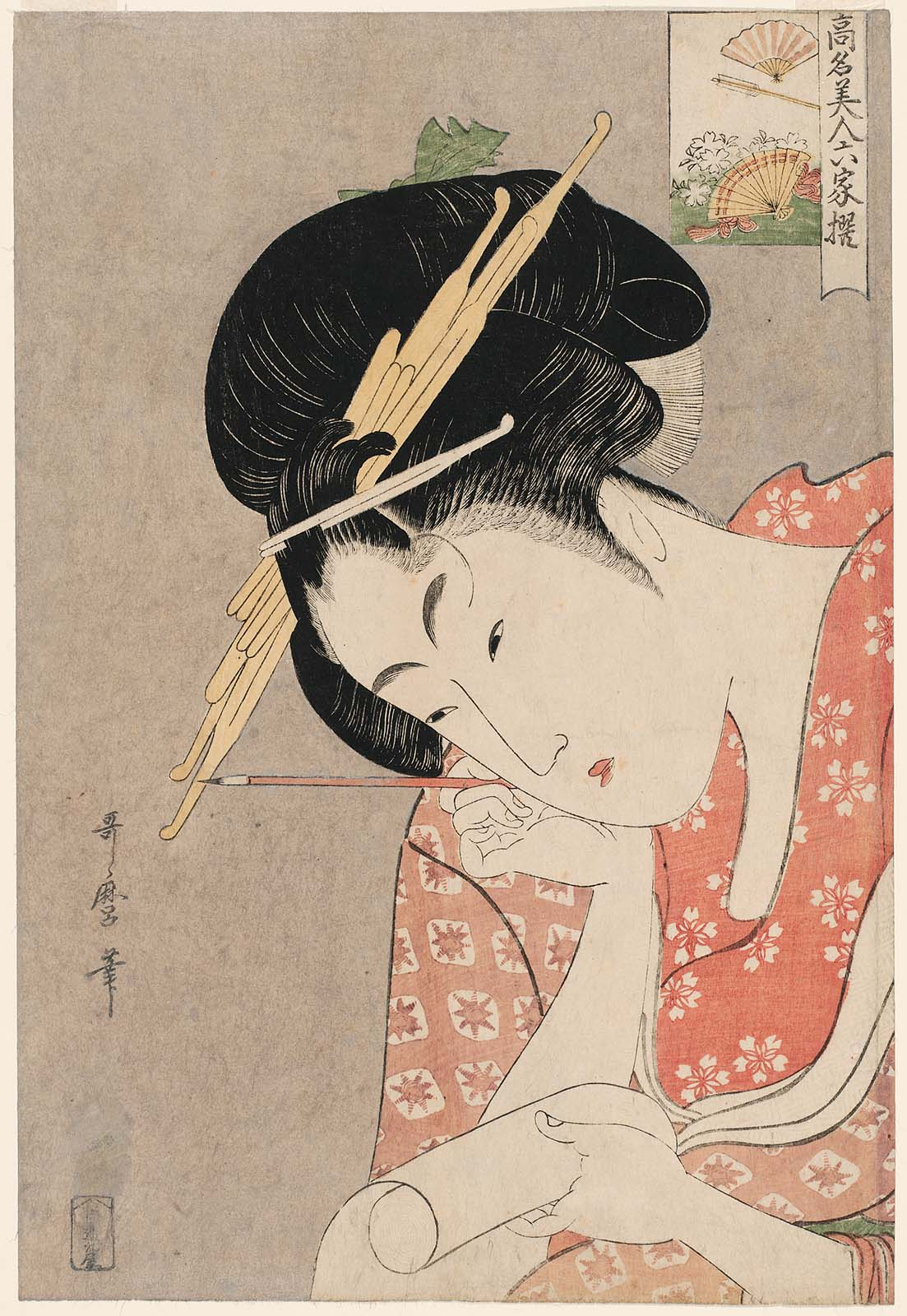
Kōmei Bijin Rokkasen version

Utamaro depicts the courtesan Hanaōgi of the Ōgiya (扇屋花扇) as she composes a letter, writing brush held to her cheek as she stares at the paper deep in thought. The Ōgiya was a large, long-established shop in Yoshiwara, (Note: The Ōgiya was at Edo-chō 2-chōme.) and Hanaōgi built her reputation in the 1780s for her beauty and her skills in singing, playing the koto, the tea ceremony, the Chinese classics, and incense.

Hanaōgi's name is deciphered from the hanji-e as follows: from top to bottom, a hand fan (扇 ōgi), an arrow (屋, ya), flowers (花 hana), and another hand fan (扇 ōgi). The Fūryū Rokkasen version matches Hanaōgi with Ono no Komachi.

=== Hinodeya goke ===
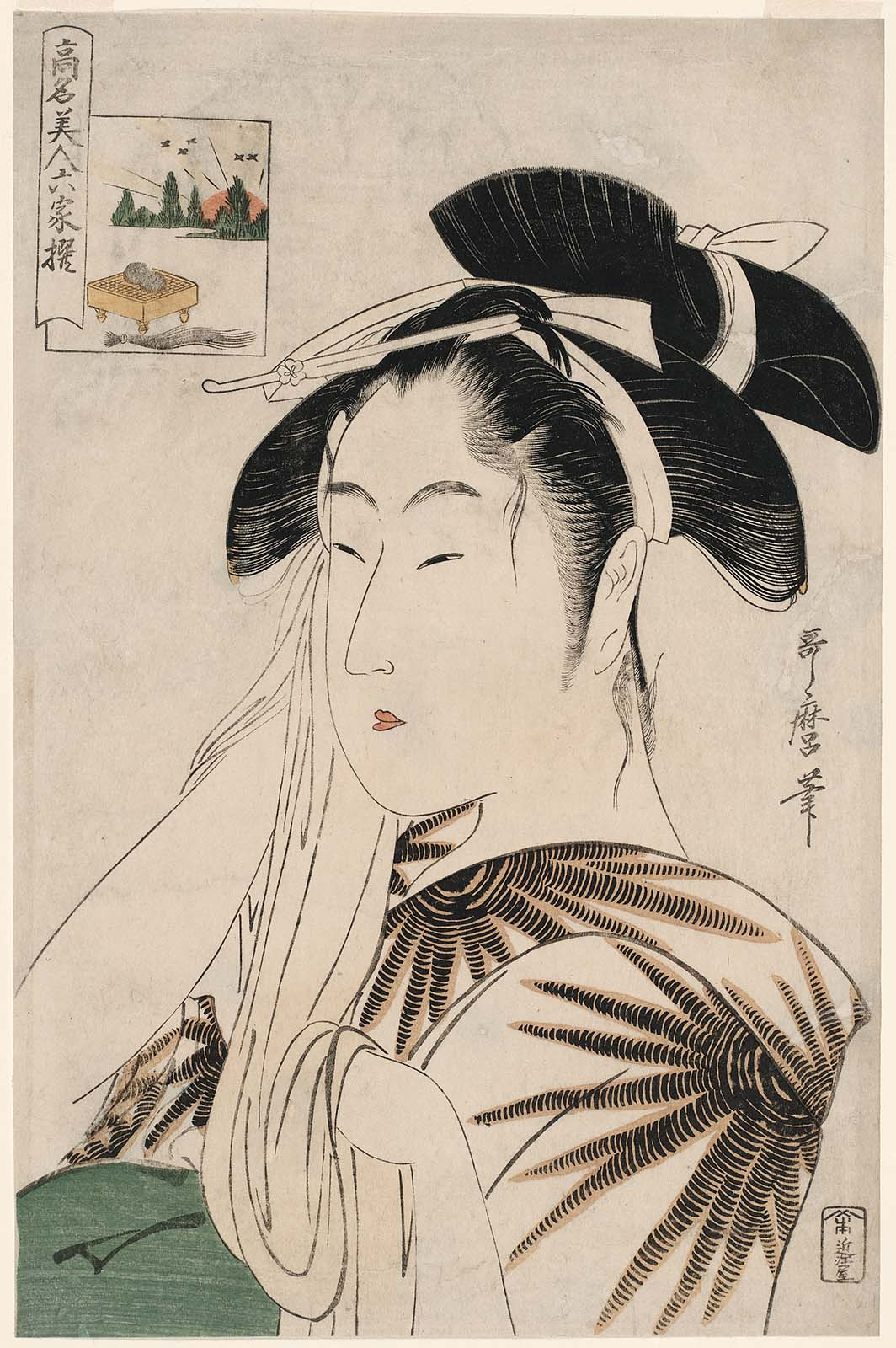
Kōmei Bijin Rokkasen version with eyebrows

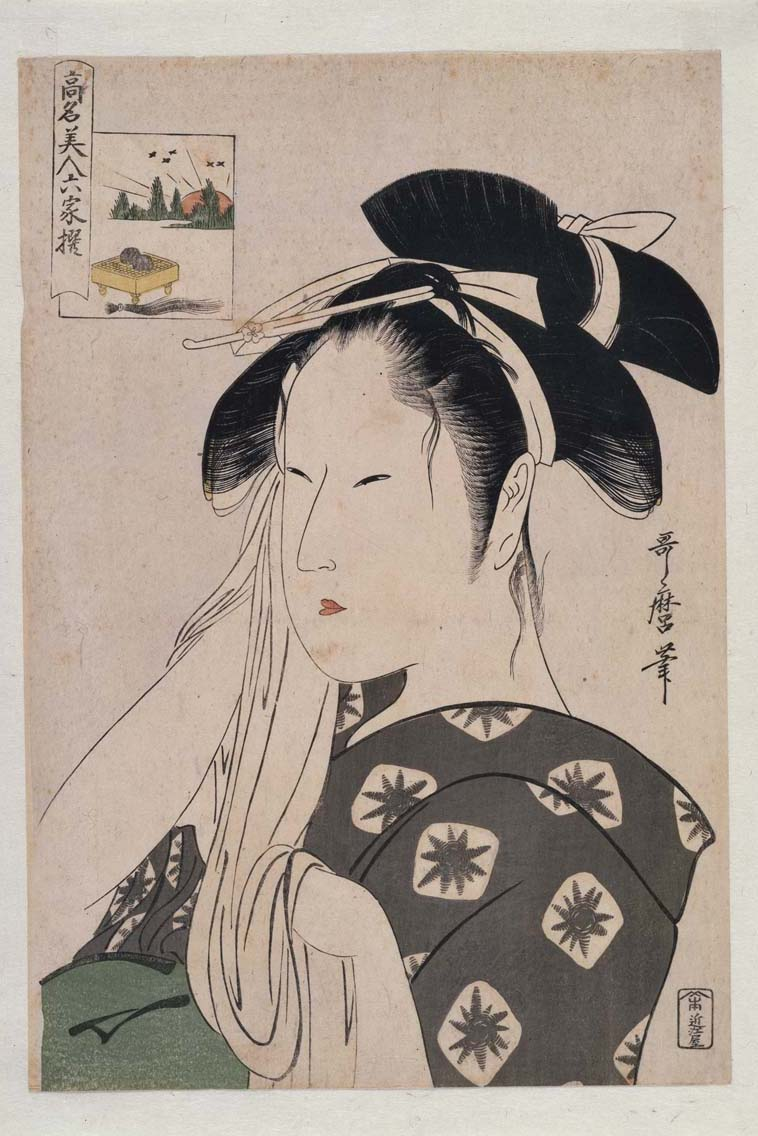
Kōmei Bijin Rokkasen version without eyebrows

The subject of this print is not clear. She may be the Hinodeya goke (日の出屋後家, "The Hinodeya widow"), the Asahiya goke (朝日屋後家, "The Asahiya widow"), or the Karasumori goke (朝日屋後家 "Karasumori widow"). She was one of the most popular beauties in Edo at the time of publication.

Utamaro depicts the widow drying her right ear with a cloth after having had a bath. At the time, the image of a woman with shaven eyebrows after a bath was considered particularly erotic. Variations of the eprint exist: he widow has eyebrows in the copy at the Museum of Fine Arts, Boston, but in the copy at the Tokyo National Museum her eyebrows are missing—shaving off the eyebrows was a sign of a married woman during the Edo period. Suggested explanations include that reprints appeared when the widow shaved or regrew her eyebrows, but such an explanation is complicated by the fact that the print of the geisha Takashimaya O-Hisa also has variants with and without eyebrows.

Utamaro symbolizes the name of the model with image in the rebus in the top left. The rising sun may refer either to the Hinodeya or to the Asahiya (both asahi and hinode meaning "rising sun"), or the crows flying out of the forest may refer to Karasumori Shrine (鳥森 Karasumori, "crow forest"). The Go board and lock of hair (ke) combine to make go-ke, homophonous with goke for "widow". The Fūryū Rokkasen version matches the widow with the poet Fun'ya no Yasuhide.

=== Tomimoto Toyohina ===
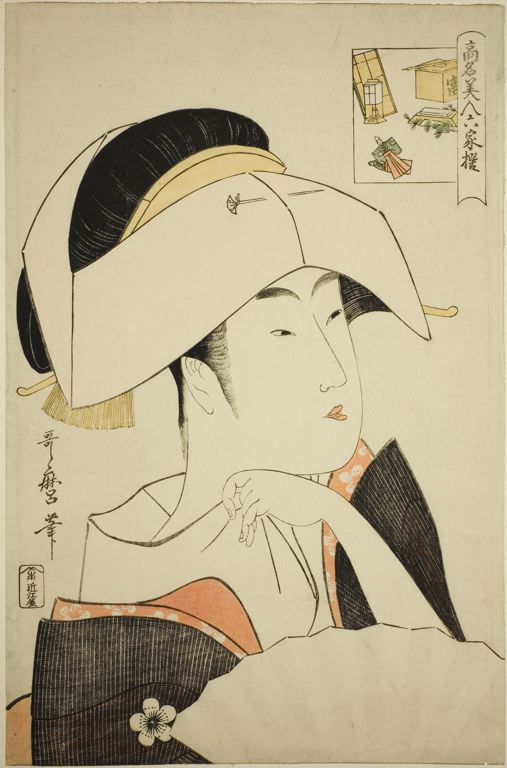
Kōmei Bijin Rokkasen version

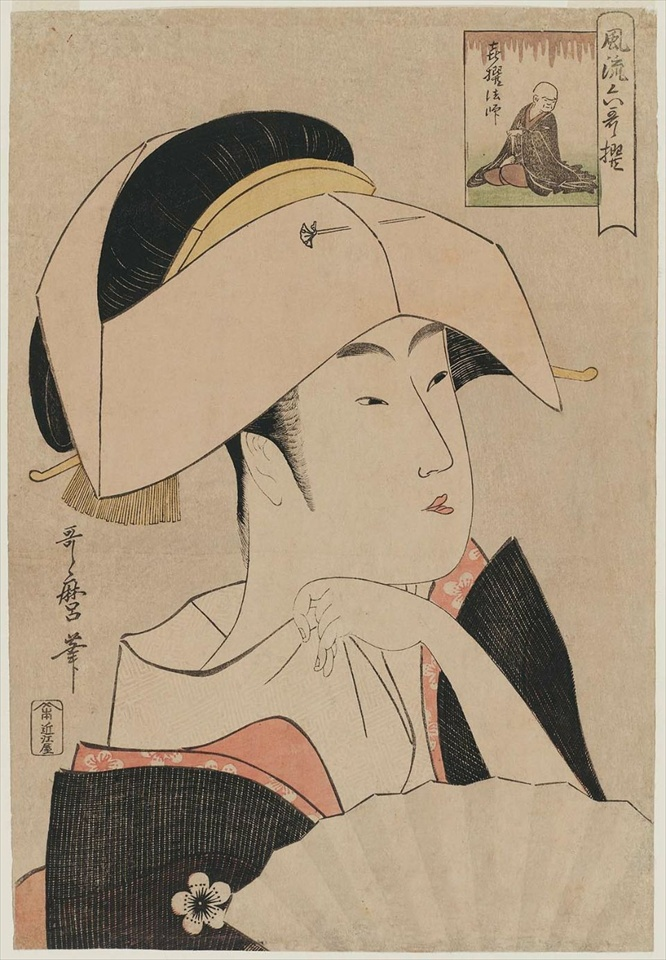
Fūryū Rokkasen version, matching Toyohina with the poet Kisen Hōshi

Tomimoto Toyohina (富本豊雛) was a geisha who worked at the Tamamuraya in Yoshiwara. She was dubbed "Tomimoto" having made her name playing Tomimoto-bushi music on the shamisen.

Toyohina's name is deciphered from the hanji-e as follows: a lottery box in the top right marked tomi (富 "wealth" or "fortune"), some algae (藻, mo), a grinding stone (砥 to), a door (戸 to), a paper lantern signifying "night" (夜 yo), and a paper hina doll (雛 hina). The Fūryū Rokkasen version matches Toyohina with Kisen Hōshi.
