= Karasumori Shrine =

Shinto shrine in Tokyo, Japan

- 烏森神社; Karasumori Jinja
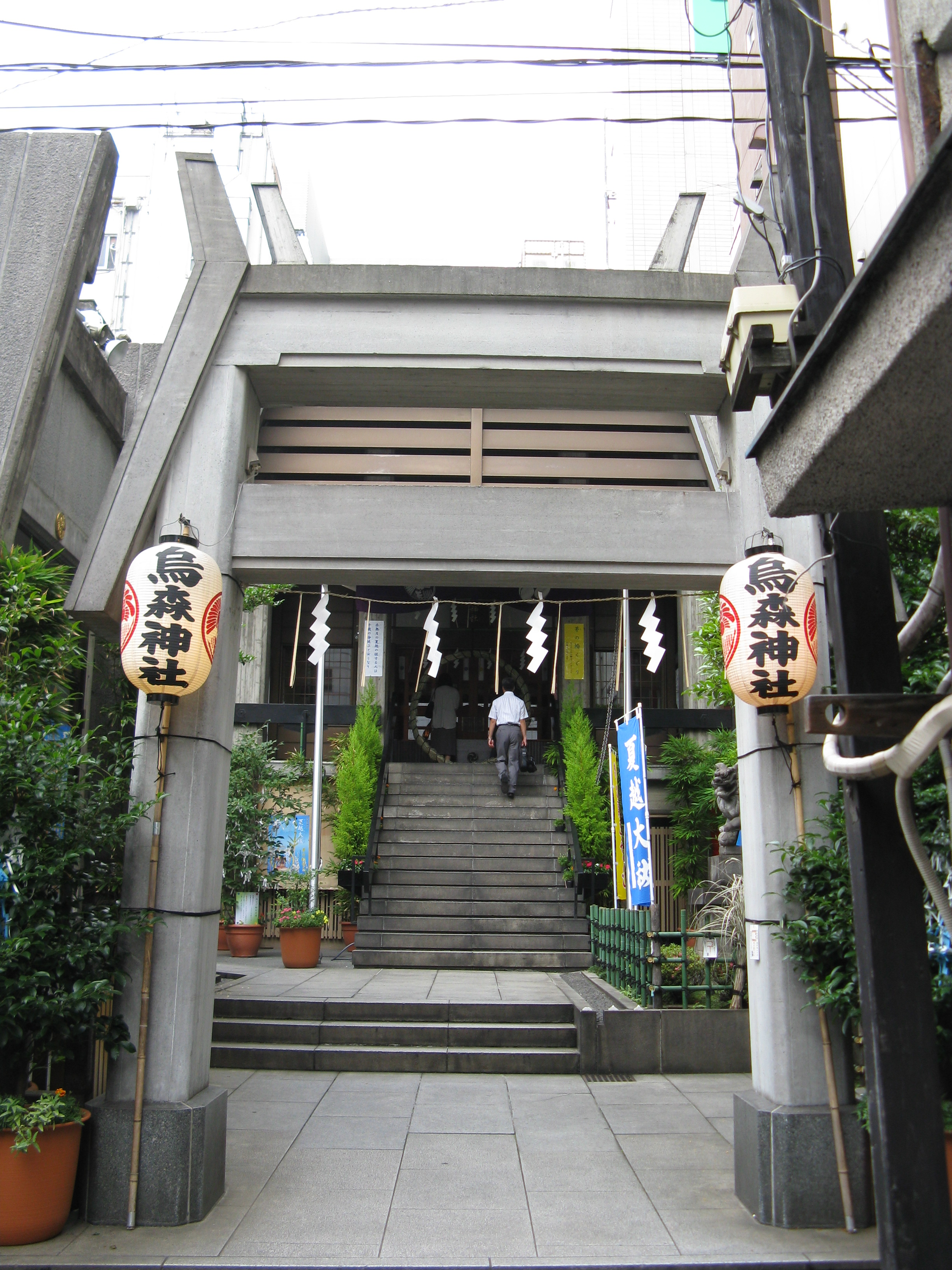

- Location within Japan

Religion
- Affiliation: Shinto

Location
- Location: 2-15-5 Shinbashi, Minato, Tokyo 105-0004
- Coordinates: 35°40′00.4″N 139°45′24.5″E

Architecture
- Established: 940

Karasumori Shrine (烏森神社, Karasumori Jinja) is a Shinto shrine located in Minato, Tokyo. It enshrines Ukanomitama (Inari Ōkami), Ame-no-Uzume and Ninigi-no-Mikoto.

== History ==
It was established in 940, the third year of the Tengyō era.

== Gallery ==
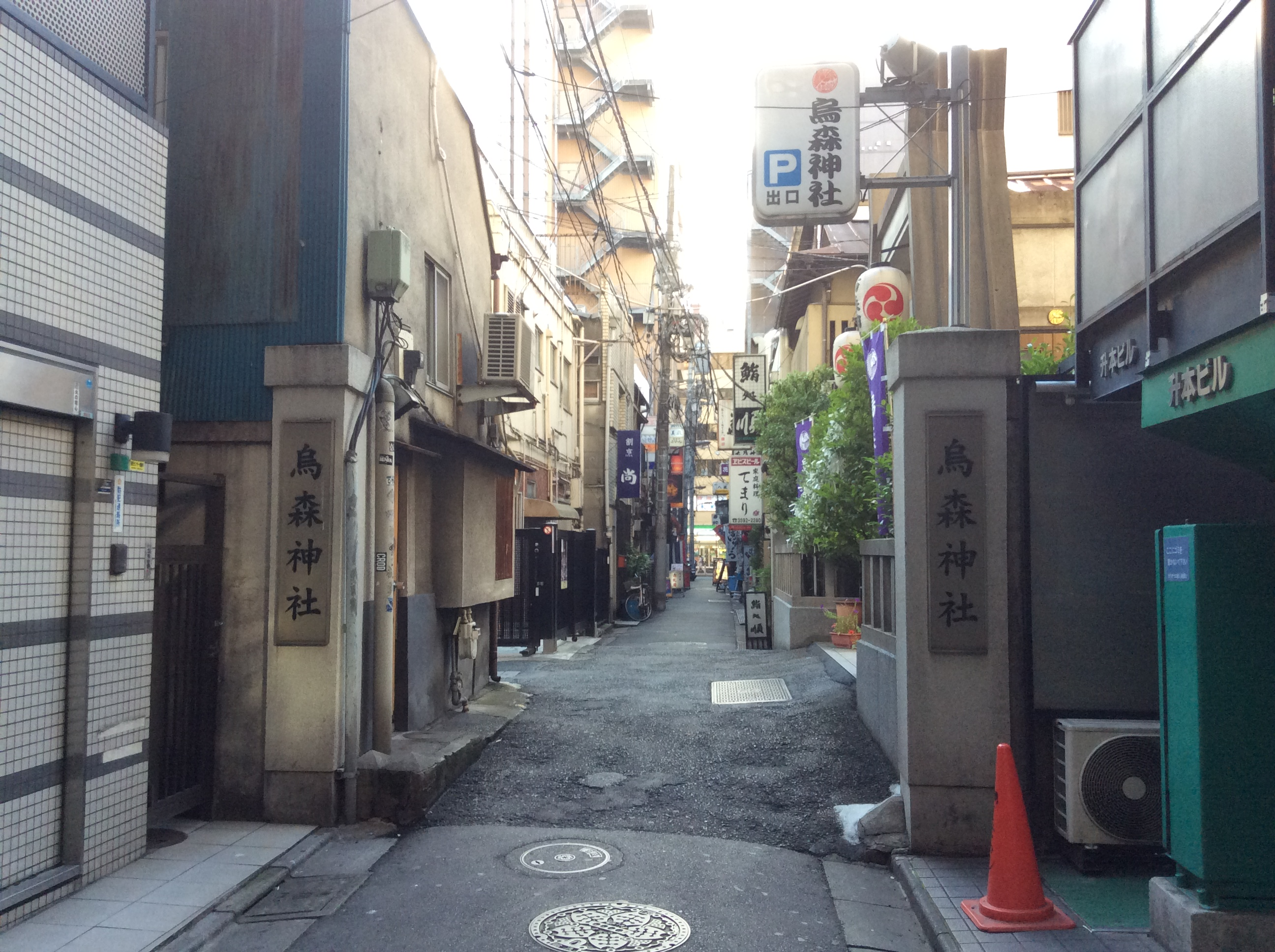

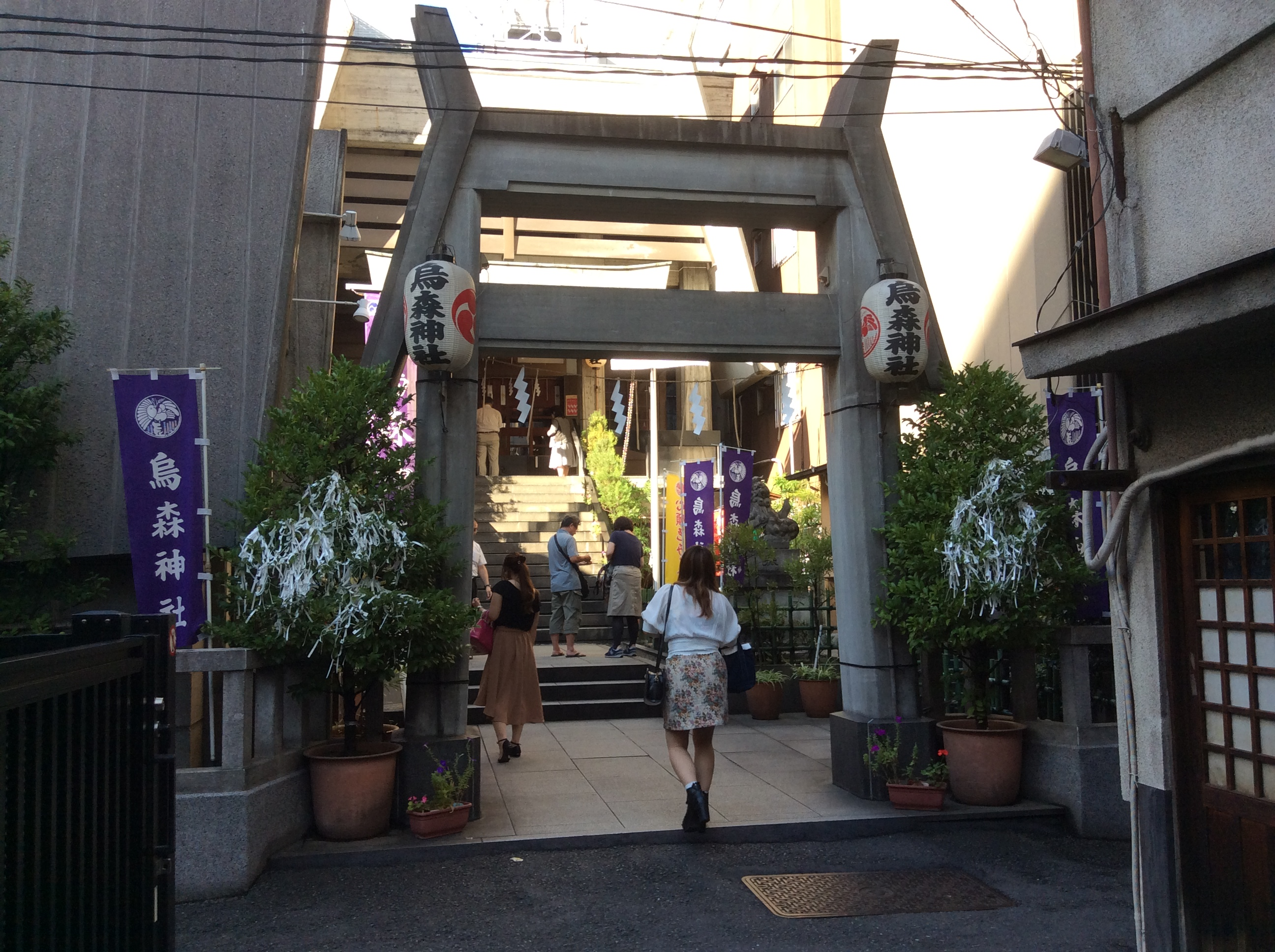

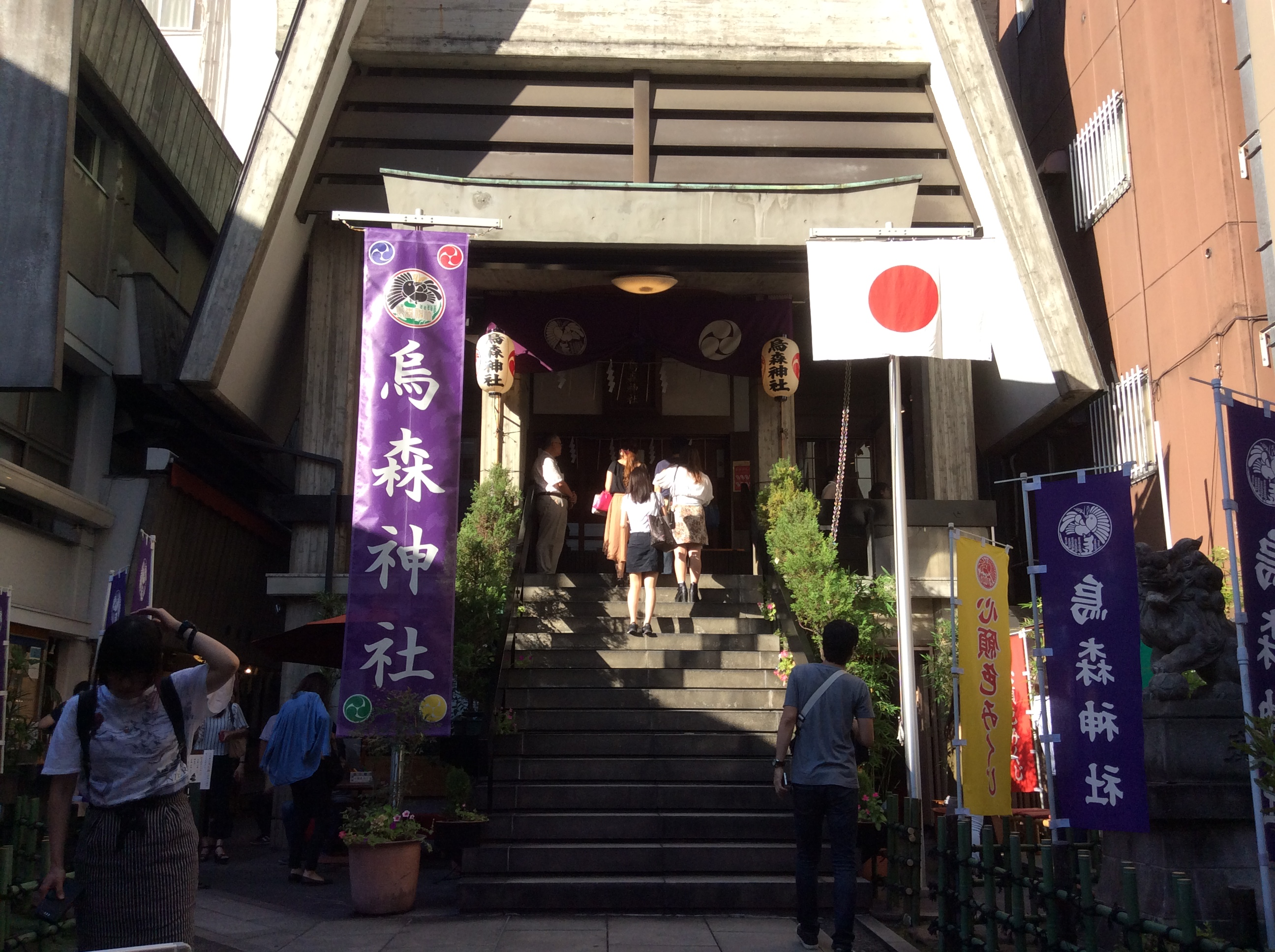

== See also ==
- List of Shinto shrines
