= Sisters of the Gion =

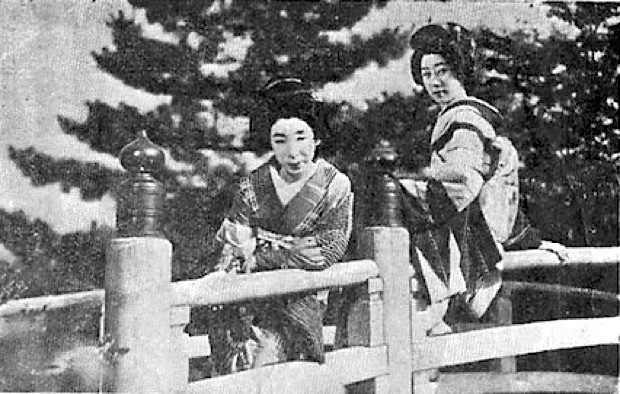
- Directed by: Kenji Mizoguchi
- Written by: Kenji Mizoguchi; Yoshikata Yoda
- Based on: Yama by Alexander Kuprin
- Produced by: Masaichi Nagata
- Cinematography: Minoru Miki
- Production company: Daiichi Eiga
- Distributed by: Shochiku
- Release date: 15 October 1936
- Running time: 95 min., 69 min. (Note: While the Japanese Movie Database and Shochiku give a running time of 95 minutes, recent announcements of the film and The Criterion Collection give a running time of only 69 minutes. According to Kinenote, the print now in circulation is shorter than the original due to missing scenes.)
- Country: Japan
- Language: Japanese

Sisters of the Gion (1936) by Kenji Mizoguchi

Sisters of the Gion (Japanese: 祇園の姉妹, Hepburn: Gion no kyōdai) or Sisters of Gion is a 1936 black and white Japanese drama film directed by Kenji Mizoguchi about two geisha sisters living in Kyoto's Gion district; it forms a diptych with Mizoguchi's Osaka Elegy which shares much of the same cast and production team. It is based on the novel Yama: The Pit by Alexander Kuprin.

== Plot ==
The story centers around two geisha sisters, Umekichi and Omocha, who live in their own lodging house (okiya) in the licensed pleasure district of Gion, Kyoto. The two women have very different outlooks on relationships with men. Umekichi, the elder sister, underwent classical geisha training and wears kimono, and has a strong sense of loyalty (giri) to her patron. Umekichi's younger sister, Omocha, was educated in public schools and wears western clothing, except when she is working as a geisha. Unlike Umekichi, Omocha doesn’t trust men and believes that they will only use geisha and then abandon them without a care. Thus, she uses men to her own advantage, willing to manipulate and lie to her customers.

Umekichi's patron is a newly bankrupt businessman named Shimbei Furusawa, who Umekichi takes care of after he loses his house and business. Omocha does not believe that her sister should support Shimbei, that doing so will prevent her from providing for herself by finding a new patron, and that she owes him nothing as, in her view, he has received more than he has given in the past. Omocha finds her sister a new patron and, one day when Umekichi is out, gives Shimbei some money to return to his wife in the country and tells him that her sister no longer wants him around. He takes the money but, rather than leaving, spends it drinking and takes up residence with his former clerk.

Omocha also attempts to find a patron for herself and appears to be successful in gaining the attention of the owner of a clothing shop. However, in the process of helping her sister, Omocha has previously taken advantage of the owner's clerk, who has stolen from the shop to provide a kimono for Umekichi and been found out.

Umekichi throws over her new patron when she learns from the kimono shop clerk of Omocha's deception of Shimbei, and returns to him. The clerk is discovered at Omocha's okiya by the shop owner and dismissed. He seeks revenge on his former employer by informing his wife of her husband's infidelity, and then exacts his revenge on Omocha by abducting her in a car and later throwing her out of it.

Ultimately, both Omocha and Umekichi are defeated at the end of the film. Umekichi is abandoned by her patron Shimbei when he is given the chance to manage a factory in the country where his wife has retired, and she ends up caring for Omocha after her hospitalization for her injuries. Bandaged and confined to her hospital bed, Omocha curses the geisha system and the sexual subjugation involved.

== Cast ==
- Isuzu Yamada as younger sister Omocha
- Yōko Umemura as older sister Umekichi
- Benkei Shiganoya as Shimbei Furusawa
- Fumio Okura as Jurakudo
- Eitarō Shindō as Kudo
- Taizō Fukami as Kimura
- Sakurako Iwama as Omasa Kudō
- Namiko Kawajima
- Reiko Aoi
- Shizuko Takizawa

== Legacy ==
Critic Tadashi Iijima considered Sisters of the Gion to be "the best prewar sound film". In the British Film Institute's "Best Japanese film of every year" list, film historian Alexander Jacoby observed that Mizoguchi "delivered his social analysis with concision, force, rigour and scalpel-like precision". Mizoguchi himself named this film and its companion piece Osaka Elegy as the works with which he achieved artistic maturity.

A remake of the same name directed by Hiromasa Nomura was released in 1956. Film historian Donald Richie also saw strong similarities between Mizoguchi's film and Kōzaburō Yoshimura's 1951 geisha drama Clothes of Deception.

== Awards ==
The film won the 1937 Kinema Junpo Award for best film (director Kenji Mizoguchi).
