= Kenji Mizoguchi =

Japanese filmmaker (1898–1956)

- 溝口 健二
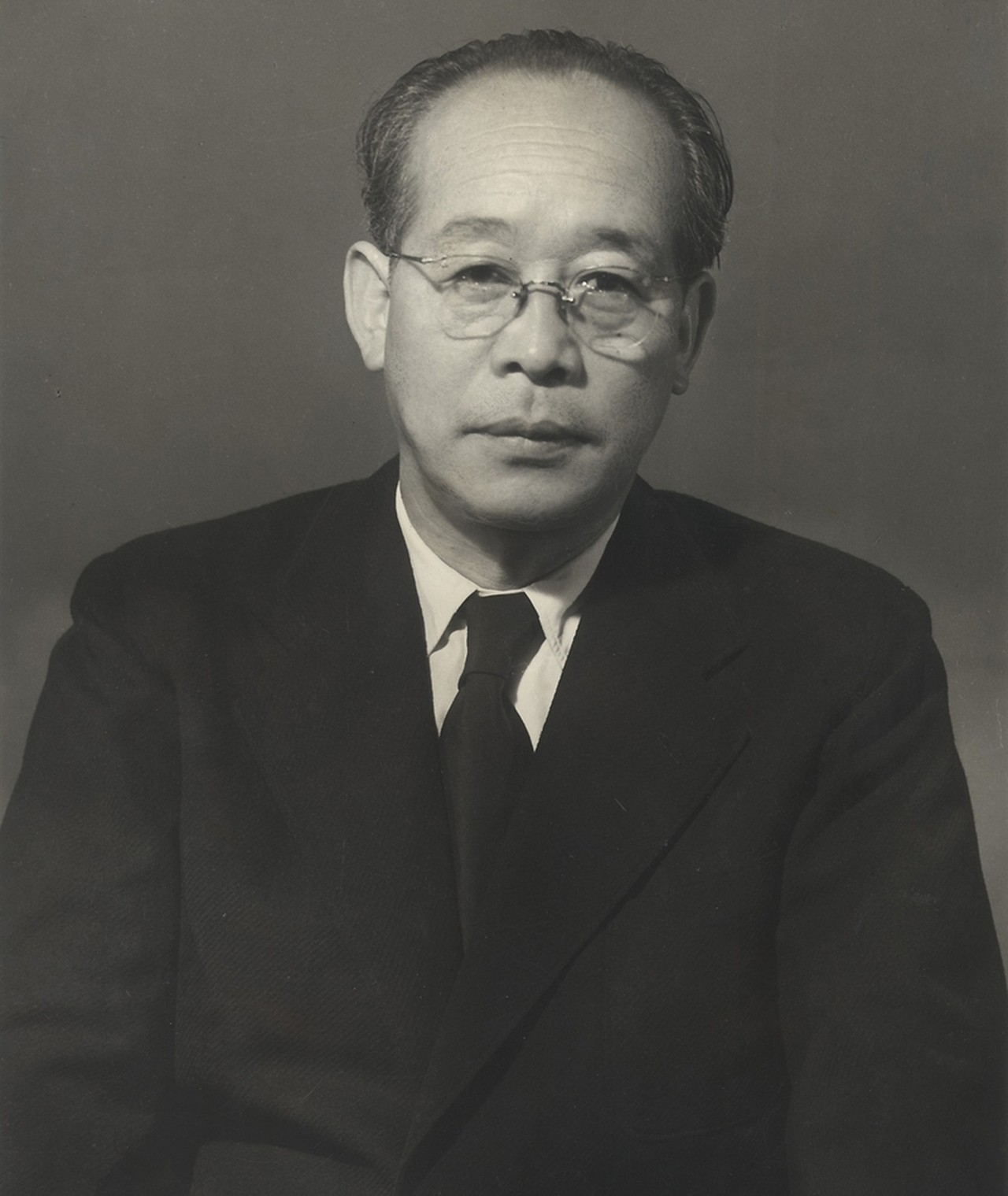
- Born: 16 May 1898; Hongō, Tokyo, Empire of Japan
- Died: 24 August 1956 (aged 58); Kyoto, Japan
- Occupations: Film director, screenwriter
- Years active: 1920–1956
- Notable work: The Story of the Last Chrysanthemums (1939); The Life of Oharu (1952); Ugetsu (1953); Sansho the Bailiff (1954)
- Spouse: Chieko Saga (m. 1927)

Kenji Mizoguchi (溝口 健二, Mizoguchi Kenji; 16 May 1898 – 24 August 1956) was a Japanese filmmaker who directed roughly one hundred films during his career between 1923 and 1956. His most acclaimed works include The Story of the Last Chrysanthemums (1939), The Life of Oharu (1952), Ugetsu (1953), and Sansho the Bailiff (1954), with the latter three all being awarded at the Venice International Film Festival. A recurring theme of his films was the oppression of women in historical and contemporary Japan. Together with Akira Kurosawa and Yasujirō Ozu, Mizoguchi is seen as a representative of the "golden age" of Japanese cinema.

== Biography ==
=== Early life (1898–1920) ===
Mizoguchi was born in Hongō, Tokyo, as the second of three children, to Zentaro Miguchi, a roofing carpenter, and his wife Masa. The family's background was relatively humble until the father's failed business venture of selling raincoats to the Japanese troops during the Russo-Japanese War. The family was forced to move to the downtown district of Asakusa and gave Mizoguchi's older sister Suzu up for adoption, which in effect meant selling her into the geisha profession.

In 1911, Mizoguchi's parents, too poor to continue paying for their son's primary school training, sent him to stay with an uncle in Morioka in northern Japan for a year, where he finished primary school. His return coincided with an onset of crippling rheumatoid arthritis, which left him with a limp for the rest of his life. In 1913, his sister Suzu secured him an apprenticeship as a designer for a yukata manufacturer, and in 1915, after the mother's death, she brought both her younger brothers into her own house. Mizoguchi enrolled for a course at the Aoibashi Yoga Kenkyuko art school in Tokyo, which taught Western painting techniques, and developed an interest in opera, particularly at the Royal Theatre at Akasaka where he helped the set decorators with set design and construction.

In 1917, his sister again helped him to find work, this time as an advertisement designer with the Yuishin Nippon newspaper in Kobe. The film critic Tadao Sato has pointed out a coincidence between Mizoguchi's life in his early years and the plots of shinpa dramas, which characteristically documented the sacrifices made by geisha on behalf of the young men they were involved with. Probably because of his familial circumstances, "the subject of women's suffering is fundamental in all his work; while sacrifice – in particular, the sacrifice a sister makes for a brother – makes a key showing in a number of his films, including some of the greatest ones (Sansho the Bailiff/Sansho Dayu [1954], for example)." After less than a year in Kobe, however, Mizoguchi returned "to the bohemian delights of Tokyo" (Mark Le Fanu).

=== Film career (1920–1956) ===
==== Early films (1920–1939) ====
Kenji Mizoguchi travelling through Europe, 1953

In 1920, Mizoguchi spoke with his friend Tadashi Tomioka, an actor at the Nikkatsu film studio in Mukojima, Tokyo, who suggested that Mizoguchi try to become an actor. After speaking with one of Nikkatsu's directors, Osamu Wakayama, Mizoguchi found that Nikkatsu was not in need of actors, but that there was an opening for an assistant director. Mizoguchi accepted the offer, and made his start within the film industry. As an assistant director, Mizoguchi worked under the likes of Tadashi Oguchi and Eizō Tanaka. After a little over a year at Nikkatsu, Mizoguchi wanted to quit the film industry, but was persuaded to remain by his sister Suzu.

In 1922, Mizoguchi was promoted to director, and his directorial debut was released the following year, The Resurrection of Love. His early works included remakes of German Expressionist cinema and adaptations of Eugene O'Neill and Leo Tolstoy. In 1923, the Nikkatsu studios in Mukojima was destroyed in the Great Kantō Earthquake, so Mizoguchi moved to Nikkatsu's studios in Kyoto. While working in Kyoto, he studied kabuki and noh theatre, and traditional Japanese dance and music. He was also a frequent visitor of the tea houses, dance halls and brothels in Kyoto and Osaka, which at one time resulted in a widely covered incident of him being attacked by a jealous prostitute and then-lover with a razor. His 1926 Passion of a Woman Teacher (Kyōren no onna shishō) was one of a handful of Japanese films shown in France and Germany at the time and received considerate praise, but is nowadays lost like most of his 1920s and early 1930s films. By the end of the decade, Mizoguchi directed a series of left-leaning "tendency films", including Tokyo March and Metropolitan Symphony (Tokai kokyōkyoku).

In 1927, Mizoguchi met and quickly fell in love with Chieko Saga, a dancer from Osaka. Chieko was married to a yakuza at the time, and her husband confronted Mizoguchi. With the help of Masakazu Nagata, a member of Nikkatsu's general affairs division, Mizoguchi convinced Chieko's husband that Mizoguchi and Chieko had not committed adultery but were in love. Mizoguchi and Chieko married in the summer of 1927. Their love for each other was strong, but their marriage was tumultuous. Mizoguchi and Chieko were both adulterous and frequently fought, with some of the fights getting violent. Chieko helped Mizoguchi with his work, often offering comments about his films during production.

In 1932, Mizoguchi left Nikkatsu and worked for a variety of studios and production companies. The Water Magician (1933) and Orizuru Osen (1935) were melodramas based on stories by Kyōka Izumi, depicting women who sacrifice themselves to secure a poor young man's education. Both have been cited as early examples of his recurring theme of female concerns and "one-scene-one-shot" camera technique, which would become his trademark. The 1936 diptych of Osaka Elegy and Sisters of the Gion, about modern young women (moga) rebelling against their surroundings, is considered to be his early masterpiece. Mizoguchi himself named these two films as the works with which he achieved artistic maturity. Osaka Elegy was also his first full sound film, and marked the beginning of his long collaboration with screenwriter Yoshikata Yoda.

1939, the year when Mizoguchi became president of the Directors Guild of Japan, saw the release of The Story of the Last Chrysanthemums, which is regarded by many critics as his major pre-war, if not his best work. Here, a young woman supports her partner's struggle to achieve artistic maturity as a kabuki actor at the price of her health.

==== Wartime films (1941–1945) ====
During World War II, Mizoguchi made a series of films whose patriotic nature seemed to support the war effort. The most famous of these is a retelling of the classic samurai tale The 47 Ronin (1941–42), an epic jidaigeki (historical drama). While some historians see these as works which he had been pressured into, others believe him to have acted voluntarily. Fellow screenwriter Matsutarō Kawaguchi went as far as, in a 1964 interview for Cahiers du Cinéma, calling Mizoguchi (whom he otherwise held in high regard) an "opportunist" in his art who followed the currents of the time, veering from the left to the right to finally become a democrat.

1941 also saw the permanent hospitalisation of his wife Chieko (m. 1927), whom he erroneously believed to have contracted venereal disease.

==== Post-war films (1945–1952) ====
During the early post-war years following the country's defeat, Mizoguchi directed a series of films concerned with the oppression of women and female emancipation both in historical (mostly the Meiji era) and contemporary settings. All of these were written or co-written by Yoda, and often starred Kinuyo Tanaka, who remained his regular leading actress until 1954, when both fell out with each other over Mizoguchi's attempt to prevent her from directing her first own film. Utamaro and His Five Women (1946) was a notable exception of an Edo era jidaigeki film made during the Occupation, as this genre was seen as being inherently nationalistic or militaristic by the Allied censors. Of his works of this period, Flame of My Love (1949) has repeatedly been pointed out for its unflinching presentation of its subject. Tanaka plays a young teacher who leaves her traditionalist milieu to strive for her goal of female liberation, only to find out that her allegedly progressive partner still nourishes the accustomed attitude of male preeminence.

==== International recognition and death (1952–1956) ====
Screenwriter Yoshikata Yoda, Actress Kinuyo Tanaka, and Kenji Mizoguchi visit Paris, 1953

Mizoguchi returned to feudal era settings with The Life of Oharu (1952), Ugetsu (1953) and Sansho the Bailiff (1954), which won him international recognition, in particular by the Cahiers du Cinéma critics such as Jean-Luc Godard, Eric Rohmer and Jacques Rivette, and were awarded at the Venice Film Festival. While The Life of Oharu follows the social decline of a woman banished from the Imperial court during the Edo era, Ugetsu and Sansho the Bailiff examine the brutal effects of war and reigns of violence on small communities and families. In between these three films, he directed A Geisha (1953) about the pressures put upon women working in Kyoto's post-war pleasure district. After two historical films shot in colour (Tales of the Taira Clan and Princess Yang Kwei Fei, both 1955), Mizoguchi once more explored a contemporary milieu (a brothel in the Yoshiwara district) in black-and-white format with his last film, the 1956 Street of Shame.

Mizoguchi died of leukemia at the age of 58 in the Kyoto Municipal Hospital. At the time of his death, Mizoguchi was working on the script of An Osaka Story, which was later realised by Kōzaburō Yoshimura.

== Filmography ==
=== Silent films ===
All of Mizoguchi's silent films are lost, except where stated.

Year	English title	Japanese title	Romanized title	Writer	Notes
1923	The Resurrection of Love		Ai ni yomigaeru hi	No	
1923	Hometown		Furusato	Yes	
1923	The Dream Path of Youth		Seishun no yumeji	Yes	
1923	City of Desire		Joen no chimata	Yes	
1923	Failure's Song is Sad		Haisan no uta wa kanashi	Yes	
1923	813: The Adventures of Arsène Lupin		813	No	
1923	Foggy Harbour		Kiri no minato	No	
1923	Blood and Soul		Chi to rei	Yes	
1923	The Night		Yoru	Yes	
1923	In the Ruins		Haikyo no naka	No	
1924	The Song of the Mountain Pass		Tōge no uta	Yes	
1924	The Sad Idiot		Kanashiki hakuchi	No	
1924	The Queen of Modern Times		Gendai no joō	No	
1924	Women Are Strong		Jose wa tsuyoshi	No	
1924	This Dusty World		Jinkyō	No	
1924	Turkeys in a Row		Shichimenchō no yukue	No	
1924	A Chronicle of May Rain		Samidare zōshi	No	
1924	No Money, No Fight		Musen fusen	No	
1924	A Woman of Pleasure		Kanraku no onna	Yes	
1924	Death at Dawn		Akatsuki no shi	No	
1925	Queen of the Circus		Kyokubadan no Jo	No	
1925	Out of College		Gakusō o idete	Yes	
1925	The White Lily Laments		Shirayuki wa nageku	No	
1925	The Earth Smiles: Part 1		Daichi wa hohoemu: Daiichibu	No	
1925	Shining in the Red Sunset		Akai yūki ni terasarete	No	
1925	The Song of Home		Furusato no uta	No	Extant
1925	Human Being		Ningen	No	
1925	Street Sketches		Shōhin eigashū: Machi no suketchi	No	Omnibus, Mizoguchi directed one of four parts
1926	General Nogi and Kuma-san		Nogi Taisho to Kuma-san	No	
1926	The Copper Coin King		Dōkaō	No	
1926	A Paper Doll's Whisper of Spring		Kaminingyō haru no sasayaki	No	
1926	My Fault, New Version		Shinsetsu ono ga tsumi	No	
1926	The Passion of a Woman Teacher		Kyōren no onna shishō	No	
1926	The Boy of the Sea		Kaikoku danji	No	
1926	Money		Kane	No	
1927	The Imperial Grace		Kōon	No	
1927	The Cuckoo		Jihi shinchō	No	
1928	A Man's Life		Hito no isshō	No	
1929	Bridge of Japan		Nihonbashi	Yes	
1929	Tokyo March	東京行進曲	Tōkyō kōshinkyoku	No	Few minutes preserved
1929	The Morning Sun Shines	朝日は輝く	Asahi wa kagayaku	No	Co-directed with Seiichi Ina, few minutes preserved
1929	Metropolitan Symphony	都会交響楽	Tokai kōkyōgaku	No	
1930	Hometown		Furusato	No	Extant
1930	Okichi, Mistress of a Foreigner	唐人お吉	Tōjin Okichi	No	Few minutes preserved
1931	And Yet They Go		Shikamo karera wa yuku	No	
1932	The Man of the Moment		Toki no ujigami	No	
1932	The Dawn of Manchuria and Mongolia		Manmō kenkoku no reimei	No	
1933	The Water Magician	滝の白糸	Taki no shiraito	No	Extant
1933	Gion Festival		Gion matsuri	Yes	
1933	The Jinpu Group		Jimpūren	Yes	
1934	The Mountain Pass of Love and Hate	愛憎峠	Aizō tōge	No	
1935	The Downfall of Osen	折鶴お千	Orizuru Osen	No	Extant

=== Sound films ===
Year	English title	Japanese title	Romanized title	Writer	Notes
1935	Oyuki the Virgin	マリヤのお雪	Mariya no Oyuki	No	
1935	The Poppy		Gubijinsō	No	
1936	Osaka Elegy	浪華悲歌	Naniwa erejī	No	
1936	Sisters of the Gion	祇園の姉妹	Gion no kyōdai	Yes	
1937	The Straits of Love and Hate	愛怨峡	Aien kyō	Yes	
1938	Song of the Camp		Roei no uta	No	
1939	The Story of the Last Chrysanthemums	残菊物語	Zangiku monogatari	No	
1939	A Woman of Osaka		Naniwa onna	No	Lost film
1941	The Life of an Actor		Geidō Ichidai Otoko	No	Lost film
1941	The 47 Ronin Part 1	元禄 忠臣蔵	Genroku chūshingura	No	
1942	The 47 Ronin Part 2	元禄 忠臣蔵	Genroku chūshingura	No	
1944	Three Generations of Danjuro		Danjurō sandai	No	
1944	Miyamoto Musashi	宮本武蔵	Miyamoto Musashi	No	
1945	The Famous Sword	名刀美女丸	Meitō Bijomaru	No	
1945	Victory Song		Hisshōka	No	Co-direction with Masahiro Makino and Hiroshi Shimizu
1946	Victory of Women	女性の勝利	Josei no shōri	No	
1946	Utamaro and His Five Women	歌麿をめぐる五人の女	Utamaro o meguru gonin no onna	No	
1947	The Love of Sumako the Actress	女優須磨子の恋	Joyū Sumako no koi	No	
1948	Women of the Night	夜の女たち	Yoru no onnatachi	No	
1949	Flame of My Love	わが恋は燃えぬ	Waga koi wa moenu	No	
1950	Portrait of Madame Yuki	雪夫人絵図	Yuki fujin ezu	No	
1951	Miss Oyu	お遊さま	Oyū-sama	No	
1951	The Lady of Musashino	武蔵野夫人	Musashino fujin	No	
1952	The Life of Oharu	西鶴一代女	Saikaku ichidai onna	Yes	
1953	Ugetsu	雨月物語	Ugetsu monogatari	No	
1953	A Geisha	祇園囃子	Gion bayashi	No	
1954	Sansho the Bailiff	山椒大夫	Sanshō dayū	No	
1954	The Woman in the Rumor	噂の女	Uwasa no onna	No	
1954	The Crucified Lovers	近松物語	Chikamatsu monogatari	No	
1955	Princess Yang Kwei Fei	楊貴妃	Yōkihi	No	
1955	Tales of the Taira Clan	新・平家物語	Shin heike monogatari	No	
1956	Street of Shame	赤線地帯	Akasen chitai	No	

== Legacy ==
In 1975, Kaneto Shindō, a set designer, chief assistant director and scenarist for Mizoguchi in the late 1930s and 1940s, released a documentary about his former mentor, Kenji Mizoguchi: The Life of a Film Director, as well as publishing a book on him in 1976. Already with his autobiographical debut film Story of a Beloved Wife (1951), Shindō had paid reference to Mizoguchi in the shape of the character "Sakaguchi", a director who nurtures a young aspiring screenwriter.

Mizoguchi's films have regularly appeared in "best film" polls, such as Sight & Sound's "The 100 Greatest Films of All Time" (Ugetsu and Sansho the Bailiff) and Kinema Junpo's "Kinema Junpo Critics' Top 200" (The Life of Oharu, Ugetsu and The Crucified Lovers). A retrospective of his 30 extant films, presented by the Museum of the Moving Image and the Japan Foundation, toured several American cities in 2014. Among the directors who have admired Mizoguchi's work are Akira Kurosawa, Orson Welles, Andrei Tarkovsky, Martin Scorsese, Werner Herzog, Theo Angelopoulos and many others. Film historian David Thomson wrote, "The use of camera to convey emotional ideas or intelligent feelings is the definition of cinema derived from Mizoguchi's films. He is supreme in the realization of internal states in external views."

=== International appreciation ===
When Mizoguchi died, many film directors and film critics gave comments about Mizoguchi's skill and influence.

‘On 24 August 1956, Japan's greatest film-maker died in Kyoto. And one of the greatest filmmakers of all time. Kenji Mizoguchi was the equal of a Murnau or a Rossellini... If poetry appears at every second, in every shot that Mizoguchi makes, it is because, as with Murnau, it is the instinctive reflection of the inventive nobility of its author’. Jean-Luc Godard, Arts, 5 February 1958.

‘There is no doubt that Kenji Mizoguchi, who died three years ago, was his country's greatest filmmaker. He knew how to discipline for his own use an art born in other climes and from which his compatriots had not always made the most of. And yet there is no slavish desire on his part to copy the West. His conception of setting, acting, rhythm, composition, time and space is entirely national. But he touches us in the same way as Murnau, Ophüls or Rossellini’. Éric Rohmer, Arts, 25 September 1959.

‘Comparisons are as inevitable as they are unfashionable: Mizoguchi is the Shakespeare of cinema, its Bach or Beethoven, its Rembrandt, Titian or Picasso’, James Quandt, Mizoguchi the Master, (retrospective of Mizoguchi centenary films), Cinematheque Ontario and The Japan Foundation, 1996.
