= List of Japanese films of the 1910s =

An incomplete list of films produced in Japan ordered by year in the 1910s. For an A–Z of films see Category:Japanese films. Also see cinema of Japan.

== 1910 ==
| Title | Director | Cast | Genre | Notes |
|---|---|---|---|---|
1910
| Kyokotsu danji Ōshio Heihachiro | Shozo Makino | Matsunosuke Onoe | | |
| Keian taiheiki yui shosetsu | Shozo Makino | Matsunosuke Onoe | | |
| Ishiyama gunki | Shozo Makino | Matsunosuke Onoe | | |
| Kansei soga | Shozo Makino | Matsunosuke Onoe | | |
| Kimura Nagatonokami Shigenari | Shozo Makino | Matsunosuke Onoe | | |
| Ōishi Kuranosuke ichidaiki | Shozo Makino | Matsunosuke Onoe | | |
| Tokugawa tenichibo | Shozo Makino | Matsunosuke Onoe | | |
| Chushingura godanme | Shozo Makino | Matsunosuke Onoe | | |
| Sanjusangendo to yurai | Shozo Makino | Matsunosuke Onoe | | |
| Isshin tasuke | Shozo Makino | Matsunosuke Onoe | | |
| Shonanko | Shozo Makino | Matsunosuke Onoe | | |
| Byakkotai | Shozo Makino | Matsunosuke Onoe | | |
| Ōta Dōkan | Shozo Makino | Matsunosuke Onoe | | |
| Chibusa no Enoki | Shozo Makino | Matsunosuke Onoe | | |
| Tenka chaya | Shozo Makino | Matsunosuke Onoe | | |
| Utsunomiya tsuritenjo | Shozo Makino | Matsunosuke Onoe | | |
| Horibe yasuebi | Shozo Makino | Matsunosuke Onoe | | |
| Sanada yukimura | Shozo Makino | Matsunosuke Onoe | | |
| Otaka gengo | Shozo Makino | Matsunosuke Onoe | | |

== 1911 ==
| Title | Director | Cast | Genre | Notes |
|---|---|---|---|---|
1911
| Soga kyodai ichidaiki | Shozo Makino | | | |
| Kyokyaku yuten kichimatsu | Shozo Makino | | | |
| Komamonoya hikobei | Shozo Makino | | | |
| Higo no komageta | Shozo Makino | | | |
| Jitsuroku sendaihagi | Shozo Makino | | | |
| Seiryoko tomigoro | Shozo Makino | | | |
| Mikazuki Jirokichi | Shozo Makino | | | |
| Echigo denkichi | Shozo Makino | | | |
| Shinzo kyodai | Shozo Makino | | | |
| Saigo takamori seinan senso | Shozo Makino | | | |
| Kawanakajima gassen | Shozo Makino | | | |
| Yasaku no kamabara | Shozo Makino | | | |
| Nigaigasa yagyu matajuro | Shozo Makino | | | |
| Chujo hime | Shozo Makino | | | |
| Rashomon | Shozo Makino | | | |
| Katsuragawa rikizo | Shozo Makino | | | |
| Sendai sodo | Shozo Makino | | | |
| Yamanaka shikanosuke | Shozo Makino | | | |
| Akita giminden | Shozo Makino | | | |
| Yanagawa shohachi | Shozo Makino | | | |
| Abe bungonokami norikiri | Shozo Makino | | | |
| Iwami shigetaro | Shozo Makino | | | |
| Sasano gonzaburo | Shozo Makino | | | |
| Araki mataemon | Shozo Makino | | | |
| Amakusa sodo | Shozo Makino | | | |
| Sekiguchi yataro | Shozo Makino | | | |
| Shimizu no Jirochō | Shozo Makino | | | |
| Shinkageryu no tatsujin tsukahara bokuden | Shozo Makino | | | |
| Anchu kusasaburo | Shozo Makino | | | |

== 1912 ==
| Title | Director | Cast | Genre | Notes |
|---|---|---|---|---|
1912
| Ii kamonnakami zentoshi | Shozo Makino | | | |
| Takeda Kōunsai | Shozo Makino | | | |
| Yūfu sarashina Aigi Morinosuke | Shozo Makino | | | |
| Fuwa Kazuemon | Shozo Makino | | | |
| Gosunkugi Torakichi | Shozo Makino | | | |
| Isshin tasuke | Shozo Makino | | | |
| Tsukushi Ichibei | Shozo Makino | | | |
| Tsukushi Ichibei | Shozo Makino | | | |
| Gōketsu Ban Dan'emon | Shozo Makino | | | |
| Gosunkugi torakichi | Shozo Makino | | | |
| Onna kyōkyaku Tamagawa | Shozo Makino | | | |
| Oyoshi | Shozo Makino | | | |
| Kanzaki Yogorō yōnen jidai | Shozo Makino | | | |
| Azekura Jūshirō | Shozo Makino | | | |
| Sakura Sōgorō | Shozo Makino | | | |
| Kyōkyaku Kozaru Shichinosuke | Shozo Makino | | | |
| Akashi Shiganosuke | Shozo Makino | | | |
| Fukagawa fudeya Sachibei | Shozo Makino | | | |
| Mito Kōmon junyūki | Shozo Makino | | | |
| Kagamiyama jitsuki | Shozo Makino | | | |
| Shiobara Tasuke ichidaiki | Shozo Makino | | | |
| Kaga sodo | Shozo Makino | | | |
| Sahara Kisaburō | Shozo Makino | | | |
| Tamiya Bōtaro Konpira rishōki | Shozo Makino | | | |
| Ishikawa Goemon ichidaiki | Shozo Makino | | | |
| Sano Shikajūrō | Shozo Makino | | | |
| Aizu no Kotetsu | Shozo Makino | | | |
| Nippon nankyoku tanken | Shozo Makino | | | |
| Nihon zaemon | Shozo Makino | | | |
| Tabakoya Kihachi | | | | |
| Nezumi kozo | | | | |
| Sano Jirōzaemon | | | | |
| Tomoe no Oman | | | | |
| Koganei Jūjirō | | | | |
| Tonosama genji | | | | |
| Kinokuniya bunzaemon | | | | |
| Kumasaka chohan | | | | |
| Kannon tanji | | | | |
| Onikojima Yatarō | | | | |
| Taira Shinnō Masakado | | | | |
| Tokugawa tenichibo | | | | |
| Koya no gijin | | | | |
| Hanagasa Bunshichi | | | | |
| Kyubi no kitsune | | | | |
| Yotsuya kaidan | | | | |
| Chūshingura | | | | |
| Nogi shogun to shogai | | | | |
| Arao josuke | | | | |
| Yodoya Tatsugorō | | | | |
| Akushichibei Kagekiyo | | | | |
| Shin nihon | | | | 13 December |
| Ryūjin Otama | | | | |
| Zigomar contre Nick Carter | | | | |

== 1913 ==
| Title | Director | Cast | Genre | Notes |
|---|---|---|---|---|
1913
| Hakkenden | | | | 21 January |
| Tsurugi no denji | | | | |
| Tanuma sodo | | | | |
| Shaka hassoki | | | | |
| Karainu Gonbei | | | | |
| Mikazuki Jirokichi kohen | | | | |
| Mikazuki Jirokichi zenpen | | | | |
| Kawanakajima | | | | |
| Kanzaki Yogorō | | | | |
| Iwami Jūtarō ichidaiki | | | | |
| Yanagisawa sodo | | | | |
| Matsumaeya gorobei | | | | |
| Araki Mataemon | | | | |
| Sanada manyūki | | | | |
| Sanada manyūki | | | | |
| Sarashina Otama | | | | |
| Daianji tsutsumi | | | | 15 May |
| Chōshi no Gorozō | | | | 1 June |
| Katayama Manzō | | | | |
| Sakuragi Ochō | | | | |
| Kaminari yoshigoro | | | | |
| Sakura Sōgorō | | | | |
| Ōishi Kuranosuke ichidai | | | | |
| Araoni Shinpachi | | | | |
| Fuwa Kazuemon | | | | |
| Murakumo Ohide | | | | |
| Musume taihai daimyo Ohatsu | | | | |
| Asahi Gengorō | | | | |
| Izutsu Menosuke | | | | |
| Shashin no adauchi | | | | |
| Yui to marubashi | | | | |
| Mongaku shohin ichidaiki | | | | |
| Okubo tenka manyuki | | | | |
| Owari Kunimaru | | | | |
| Tokugawa tenichibo | | | | |
| Yakko no Ohatsu | | | | |
| Sakura Sōgorō | | | | |
| Chūshingura | | | | |
| Protéa | | | | |
| Tokugawa Yoshinobu kō ichidaiki | | | | 22 December |

== 1914 ==
| Title | Director | Cast | Genre | Notes |
|---|---|---|---|---|
1914
| Arima gennosuke | | | | |
| Chūshingura | | | | |
| Jiraiya | | | | |
| Kabuto no hoshikage | | | | |
| Hashiba no chokichi | | | | |
| Kogitsune reizo | | | | |
| Kume no heinai | | | | |
| Kunisada chuji nikko enzo to kunisada chuji | | | | |
| Minamoto yorimitsu yokai taiji | | | | |
| Miyamoto Musashi | | | | |
| Sakamoto Ryuma | | | | |
| Tenjiku Tokubei | | | | |
| Tsuchi gumo | | | | |
| Tengu kaijo | | | | |

== 1915-1919 ==
| Title | Director | Cast | Genre | Notes |
|---|---|---|---|---|
1915
| Sendaihagi | | Kasen Nakamura | Kyūgeki | Studio: M. Kashii; 5-minute print extant. |
| Gorō Masamune kōshi den | Jirō Yoshino | Shirōgorō Sawamura | Kyūgeki | Studio: Tenkatsu; 38-minute print extant. |
| Ishii genhachiro | | | | |
| Kaisoden | | | | 5 April |
| Oomaeda eigorō | | | | 7 May |
| Shibukawa Bangorō | | | | 3 June |
| Yuten kichimatsu | | | | 4 July |
| Hatamoto gonin otoko | | | | |
1916
| Kurushima genbâ | | Matsunosuke Onoe, Utae Nakamura, Chosei Kataoka, Kijaku Otani, Sennosuke Nakamura | | |
| Yoshiōka kanefusa | Yaroku Kobayashi | Matsunosuke Onoe, Sennosuke Nakamura, Kitsuraku Arashi, Kijaku Otani, Utae Nakamura, Chosei Kataoka | | |
1917
| Sarukani-gassen | Seitarou Kitayama | | Animated | Lost film |
| Yukan uri | | | | |
| Ukare kokyu | | | | |
1918
| Narikin (a.k.a. Sanji Goto) | Thomas Kurihara, Harry Williams | Iwajiro Nakajima, Miyoko Suzuki | Comedy | Produced in 1918, released in Japan on 2 September 1921. Studio: Sunrise Film, Tōyō Film. 35-minute print extant. |
1919
| Awaremi no kyoku | | | | |
| Sei no kagayaki | Norimasa Kaeriyama | Minoru Murata, Sugisaku Aoyama, Iyokichi Kondo, Harumi Hanayagi | | Released 13 September. Studio: Eiga Geijutsu Kyōkai. |
| Miyama no otome | Norimasa Kaeriyama | Minoru Murata, Harumi Hanayagi, Iyokichi Kondo, Sugisaku Aoyama | | Released 13 September. Studio: Eiga Geijutsu Kyōkai. |
