= Harumi Hanayagi =

Japanese film and stage actress

- 花柳はるみ
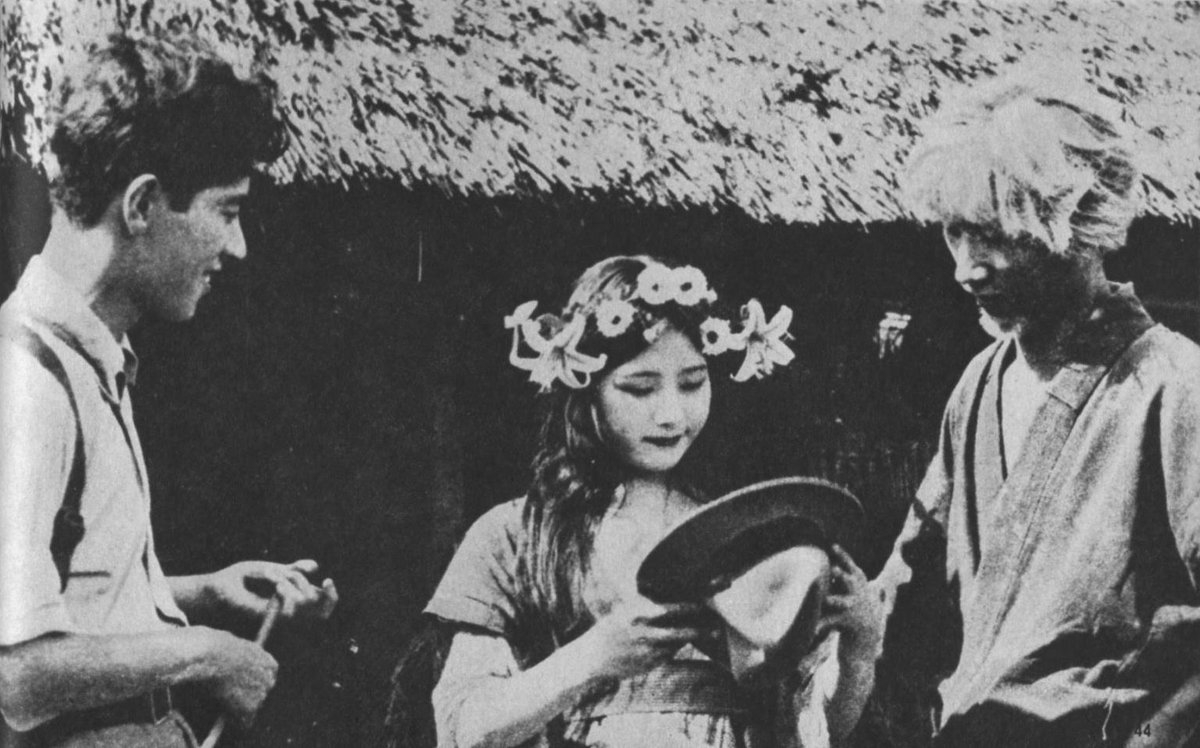
- Hanayagi in Maid of the Deep Mountains (1918)
- Born: February 24, 1896; Kashima District, Ibaraki, Japan
- Died: October 11, 1962 (aged 66)
- Occupation: Actor
- Years active: 1915–1928

Harumi Hanayagi (花柳 はるみ, Hanayagi Harumi; 24 February 1896 – 11 October 1962) was a pioneering Japanese film and stage actress.

== Career ==
In 1915, Hanayagi became a student at the Geijutsuza, the modern theater troupe led by Hōgetsu Shimamura and Sumako Matsui, and made her stage debut. She moved to the Tōjisha troupe in 1917 and appeared with them in a series of films directed by Norimasa Kaeriyama for Tenkatsu, starting with The Glow of Life (released 1919). In an era where female roles on screen were played by male actors (onnagata), Hanayagi was considered "the first billed appearance of a female performer" in Japanese cinema, even though actresses such as Nakamura Kasen had appeared in earlier films or in rensageki, a combination of film and live stage performance. After appearing in more films, she focused her career on the stage after 1920, eventually appearing in the Tsukiji Little Theater as well as the proletarian theater of Tomoyoshi Murayama. She retired in 1928 after getting married.

== Selected filmography ==
- The Glow of Life (1919)
- The Maid of the Deep Mountains (1919)
