= Minoru Murata =

Japanese film director

Minoru Murata 村田 實
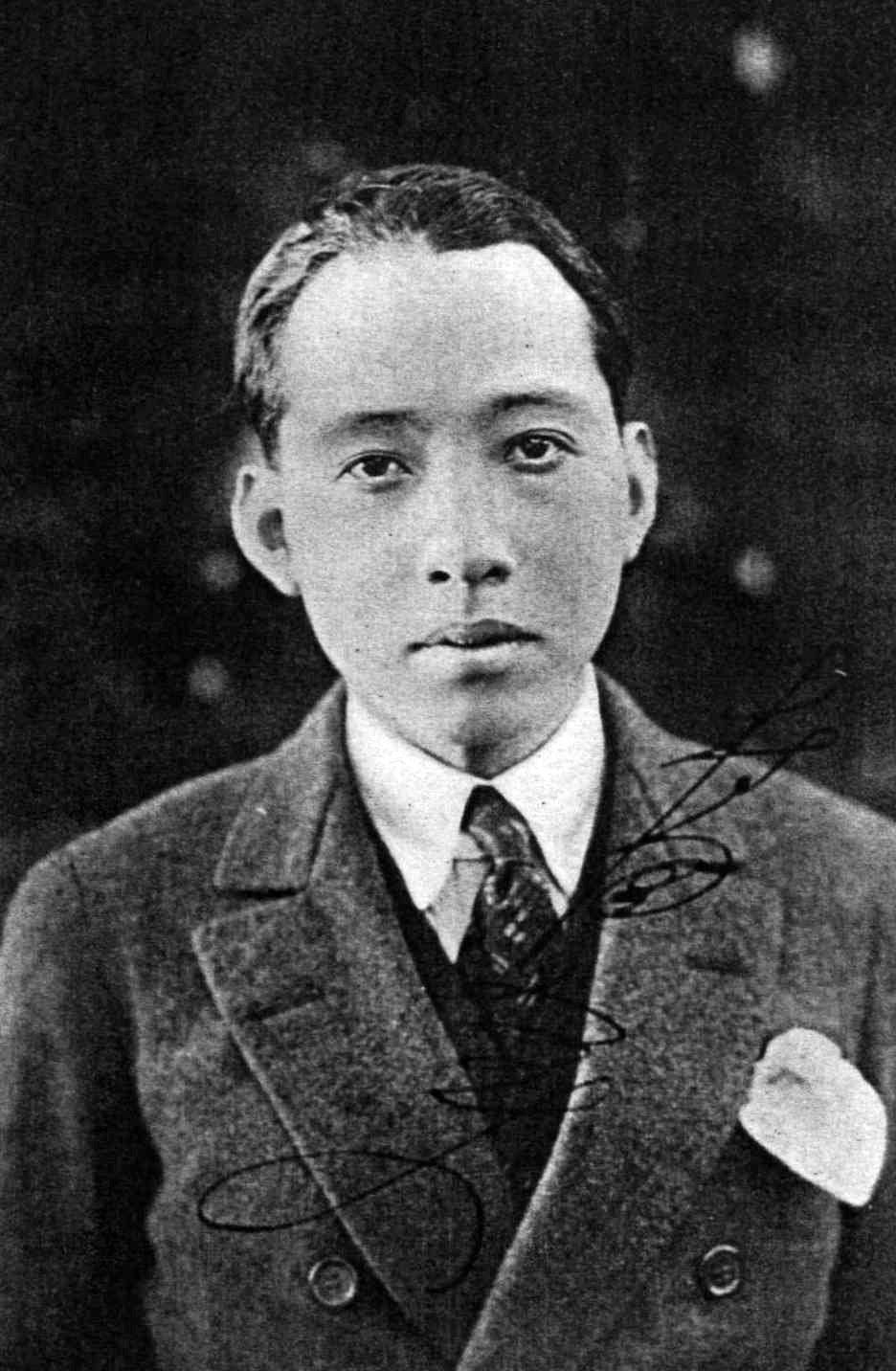
- Minoru Murata in 1929
- Born: 2 March 1894; Tokyo
- Died: 26 June 1937 (aged 43)
- Occupations: Film director, screenwriter, actor

Minoru Murata (村田 實, Murata Minoru; 2 March 1894 – 26 June 1937) was a Japanese film director, screenwriter, and actor who was one of the major directors of the silent era in Japan.

== Career ==
Born in Tokyo, Murata started out as a shingeki actor on the stage. Murata's troupe appeared in the first "pure films" directed by Norimasa Kaeriyama at Tenkatsu in 1918. On the recommendation of the playwright Kaoru Osanai, he then joined Shochiku in 1920 and participated in the actors school Osanai ran there. He ended up directing Souls on the Road (1921), a ground breaking reformist film that is one of the few films surviving from that era. Murata later moved to Nikkatsu, where he directed such critical hits as Seisaku's Wife (1924) and The Street Juggler (1925) which were "important in establishing the form of Japanese films about contemporary life." He later worked at Shinkō Kinema. He started up the important journal, Eiga kagaku kenkyū, in 1928 with Kiyohiko Ushihara, and helped found the Directors Guild of Japan in 1936, becoming its first president. Often battling illness, he died suddenly in 1937.

== Selected filmography ==
=== As actor ===
- The Glow of Life (1918)

=== As director ===
- Souls on the Road (路上の霊魂, Rojō no Reikon) (1921)
- Seisaku's Wife (清作の妻, Seisaku no Tsuma) (1924)
- The Street Juggler (街の手品師, Machi no Tejinashi) (1925)
- Nichirin (日輪, The Sun) (1926)
- Muteki (霧笛, The Foghorn) (1934)

=== As writer ===
- Furusato no Uta (1925, dir. Kenji Mizoguchi)
