= Kinema Record =

Japanese film magazine

- Categories: Film, cinema of Japan
- Frequency: Monthly
- First issue: 1913
- Final issue: 1917
- Country: Japan
- Language: Japanese

Kinema Record (キネマ・レコード, Kinema rekōdo) was a Japanese film magazine published during the 1910s that played an important role in the Pure Film Movement. In 1914, with no serious film magazines being published in Japan at the time, Norimasa Kaeriyama, Yoshiyuki Shigeno and other students interested in movies formed the Japan Cinematographist Association and began to publish the coterie magazine Film Record in October. They changed its name to Kinema Record in December. The monthly magazine contained a range of articles, from film reviews to how-to advice on making and selling movies, but it primarily came to represent calls for reforming a Japanese cinema that was considered too theatrical and uncinematic. A full reprint of the available issues was published in 1999 by Kokusho Kankōkai.

Kinema Record released a total of 51 issues between 1913 and 1917, including the first four issues as Firumu rekōdo. In the last issue, Kinema Record announced in its "To the Trade" section that it had been brought out by the Kinograph Publishing Company. Kaeriyama was made president and editor in chief, but soon left and the publication ended. Its spirit was carried on by other journals like Katsudō no sekai and Kinema junpō.

== Bibliography ==
- Joanne Bernardi (2001). Writing in Light: The Silent Scenario and the Japanese Pure Film Movement. Wayne State University Press. ISBN 0-8143-2926-8.
- Aaron Gerow (2010). Visions of Japanese Modernity: Articulations of Cinema, Nation, and Spectatorship, 1895–1925. University of California Press. ISBN 978-0-520-25456-5.
