= Kiryu =

Kiryū or Kiryu may refer to:

== People ==
- Kiryu Coco, a Japanese Virtual YouTuber formerly associated with hololive
- Yoshihide Kiryū (born 1995), Japanese track and field sprinter
- Kiryū Yūyū (1873–1941), Japanese journalist and activist

== Places ==
- Kiryū, Gunma, a city in Gunma Prefecture, Japan

== Fictional characters ==
- Kazuma Kiryu, protagonist of the Yakuza video game series
- Kiryu family, characters from the Fatal Frame / Project Zero video game series
- Yūzuki Kiryū, a character in the Kissxsis manga and anime
- Yoshiya Kiryū (also called Joshua), a character in the video game The World Ends with You
- Mimori Kiryu, a character from s-CRY-ed
- Zero and Ichiru Kiryu, characters from Vampire Knight
- Kiryu, another name for the third Mechagodzilla character in the Japanese Godzilla franchise
- Kiryu Kyosuke, or Kalin Kessler, a character from Yu-Gi-Oh! 5D's
- Kiryū Moeka, a character from the visual novel Steins;Gate
- Sento Kiryu, protagonist of the Kamen Rider Build
- Wakatsu Kiryū, a character from Haikyuu!!

== Other ==
- Kiryū (己龍), a Japanese visual kei band
- 6275 Kiryu, an asteroid
