= The Glow of Life =

- Directed by: Norimasa Kaeriyama
- Written by: Norimasa Kaeriyama
- Starring: Minoru Murata; Sugisaku Aoyama; Iyokichi Kondō; Harumi Hanayagi; Shizue Natsukawa
- Cinematography: Katsu Ōmori
- Distributed by: Tenkatsu
- Release date: 13 September 1919
- Running time: 4 reels
- Country: Japan
- Language: Silent

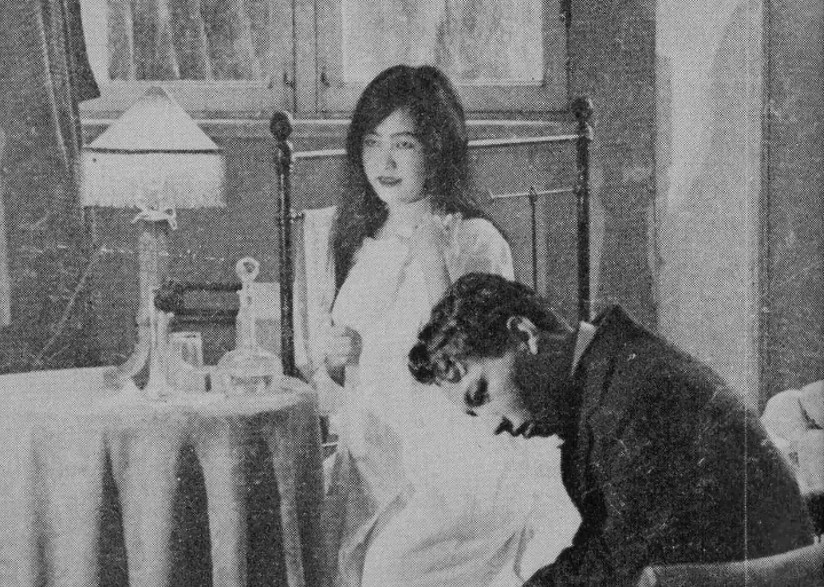
Still from the movie

The Glow of Life (生の輝き, Sei no Kagayaki; also known as The Glory of Life) is a Japanese film directed by Norimasa Kaeriyama made in 1918 and released in 1919 by Tenkatsu. It is considered the first in a series of films aimed at reforming and modernizing Japanese cinema.

== Plot ==
A country girl Teruko falls in love with the aristocrat Yanagisawa. When she once asks him what the meaning of life is, he responds that it is to live freely. Unfortunately, he does that by abandoning her. Teruko tries to commit suicide, but luckily is saved. Yanagisawa returns and apologizes to her.

== Cast ==
- Minoru Murata as Yanagisawa
- Harumi Hanayagi as Teruko
- Sugisaku Aoyama as Teruko's father
- Iyokichi Kondō as Yamashita
- Shizue Natsukawa as Teruko's younger sister

== Production ==
Kaeriyama was one of the leaders of the Pure Film Movement, which aimed to reform Japanese cinema by eliminating its theatrical aspects and creating films that obeyed the essence of cinema. Kaeriyama was a film critic who worked at the Tenkatsu studio, which allowed him to direct his first film, The Glow of Life, in 1918, but did not release it until 1919. (The same fate befell his second film, The Maid of the Deep Mountain, which was also made in 1918 but not released until 1919 at the same time as The Glow of Life.) He produced The Glow of Life under the rubric of the Motion Picture Art Association and used shingeki actors such as Iyokichi Kondō and Minoru Murata, the latter who later became a prominent film director. The story ended up being rather melodramatic, but its use of a modern script was considered revolutionary. Kaeriyama "attempted to make an integrated use of all the cinematic techniques he knew", but "the result was sometimes derivative and always eclectic". In an era where female roles on screen were still performed by men, Harumi Hanayagi's "was the first billed appearance of a female performer" in Japanese cinema.

== Reception ==
According to the film historian Joanne Bernardi, "reviews and comments were enthusiastic about Kaeriyama's attempt to try something new, but expressed disappointment in the films themselves." The film's potential excited and disappointed young film fans. The director Kajiro Yamamoto wrote that when he first saw it he felt that, "“A film had been made in Japan for the first time. Although there had been moving pictures of shinpa melodramas and ninjutsu pictures, there were as yet no films.… Yet somehow something was missing.… A true film would not be so crude." Still it was an influential film. According to Donald Richie, The Glow of Life "despite its failure to draw a large audience, was considered successful enough that the industry as a whole, scenting future profit, grew more reform-minded."
