= Oyama Shrine =

Oyama Shrine may refer to:

- Oyama Shrine (Ishikawa) (尾山神社), Kanazawa, Ishikawa
- Oyama Shrine (Tateyama) (雄山神社), Tateyama, Toyama
- Oyama Aburi Shrine
