= Eizō Tanaka =

Japanese film director and actor (1886–1968)

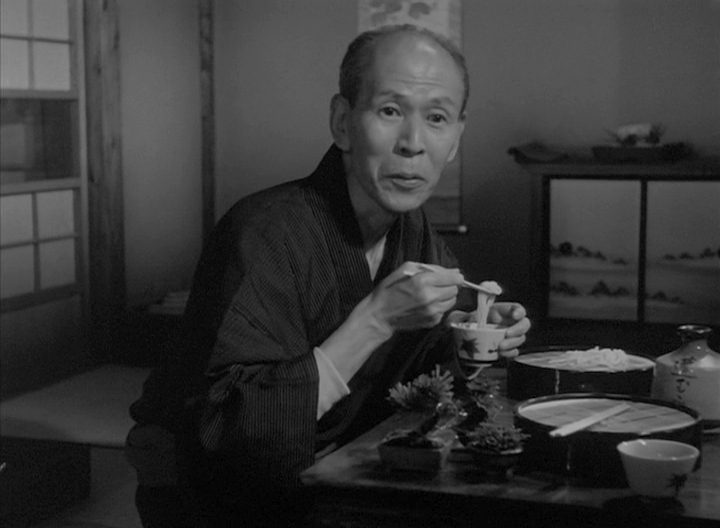
- Eizō Tanaka in Gan (雁) directed by Shirō Toyoda - 1953.
- Born: November 3, 1886; Japan
- Died: June 13, 1968 (aged 81); Japan
- Occupations: Film director Actor; Screenwriter
- Years active: 1917 –

Eizō Tanaka (田中 栄三, Tanaka Eizō; 3 November 1886 - 13 June 1968) was an early Japanese film director, screenwriter, and actor.

== Life and career ==
Tanaka initially trained as a stage actor in the shingeki movement under Kaoru Osanai, but eventually joined the Nikkatsu film studio in 1917. He debuted as a director in 1918 but mostly had to work with shinpa stories, not the shingeki techniques he was used to although two early films, The Living Corpse (Ikeru shikabane) and The Cherry Orchard (Sakura no sono) were based on Tolstoy and Chekhov respectively. Working in parallel with the Pure Film Movement, Tanaka made two films, Kyōya eirimise (1922) and Dokuro no mai (1923), based on his own screenplays, that were highly praised for their cinematic technique. He remained a rather conservative filmmaker and still used oyama (male actors) in female roles, including in his masterpiece Kyōya eirimise, a melodrama about a merchant's destructive love for a geisha. He used actresses for the first time in Dokuro no mai, a story of a monk reminiscing about his youth and early loves.

His career as a director came to an end in 1923 aside from two minor sound films in the 1930s but he also penned screenplays for such directors as Kenji Mizoguchi and Yutaka Abe and concentrated on acting, appearing in films by Tadashi Imai and Shirō Toyoda. In later life, Tanaka was also active as an educator, teaching at the Nihon Eiga Haiyū Gakkō and at Nihon University helping the careers of such actors as Kōji Shima, Isamu Kosugi, and Shin Saburi. He also wrote several books, including a history of shingeki.

== Partial filmography ==
All produced by Nikkatsu unless otherwise noted.

- The Living Corpse (生ける屍, Ikeru shikabane) (March 1918)
- The Cherry Orchard (桜の園, Sakura no sono) (April 1918)
- Foster Sisters (乳姉妹, Chikyōdai) (May 1918)
- Matsukaze and Murasame (松風村雨, Matsukaze Murasame) (Oct. 1918)
- Rise and Fall (浮き沈み, Ukishizumi) (June 1919)
- Song of Biwa (琵琶歌, Biwa uta) (June 1919)
- Foster Sisters (乳姉妹, Chikyōdai) (Jan. 1922) - new version of 1918 film
- The Kyoya Collar Shop (京屋襟店, Kyōya eirimise) (Dec. 1922)
- Dance of the Skull (髑髏の舞, Dokuro no mai) (March 1923)
- Namiko (浪子) (May 1932) (produced by Oriental Film (オリエンタル映画社))
- Boy's Chushingura (少年忠臣蔵, Shōnen Chūshingura) (Feb.1933) (produced by Kyōdai Productions (兄弟プロダクション))
