= Murō Saisei =

Japanese writer (1889–1962)

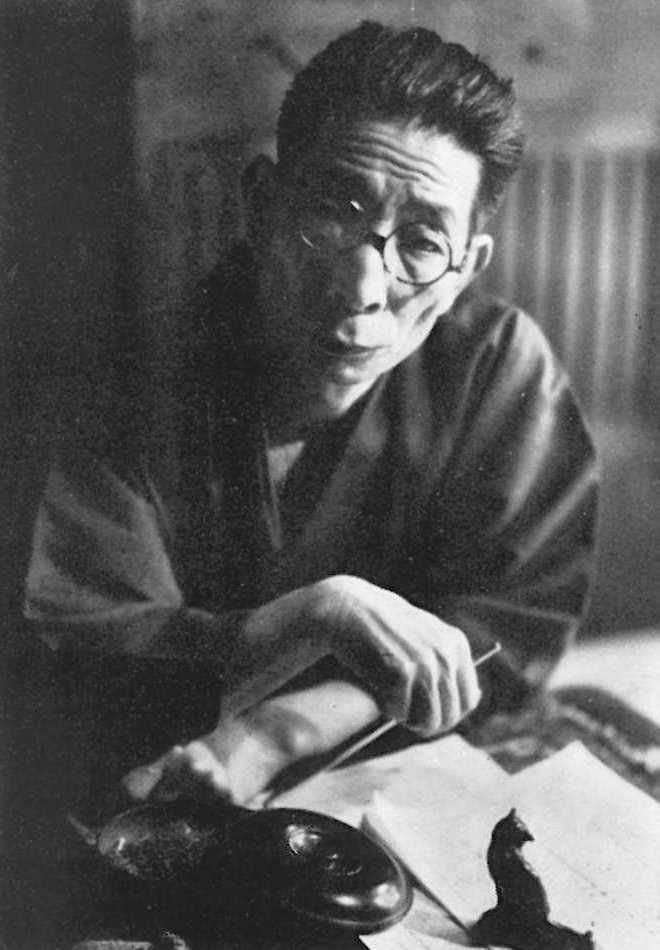
- Murō in 1948
- Born: 1 August 1889; Kanazawa, Ishikawa, Japan
- Died: 26 March 1962 (aged 72); Tokyo, Japan
- Occupation: Writer
- Writing career
- Genres: Poetry, short stories, novels

Murō Saisei (室生犀星; 1 August 1889 – 26 March 1962), real name Murō Terumichi, was a Japanese writer of poetry, short stories and novels.

== Biography ==
=== Early life ===
Murō was born in Kanazawa, Ishikawa Prefecture, in 1889. His mother Haru was the mistress of Kobata Yozaemon-kichidane, a low-ranking military commander from the Kobata family. Right after his birth, he was adopted by Akai Hatsu, a common-law wife of Murō Shinjo, the chief priest at Uho Temple. He gained his Murō family name at the age of seven when he was formally adopted by his stepfather. He never met his biological parents.

The fact that he was born as an illegitimate child had an immense impact on his life and his literature. During his childhood, he was bullied by peers as "the mistress' child". At the same time, he craved for a mother he never had. This gave him the burden of having double bind thoughts about his biological mother, such as in the following poem, written in 1943 when he was 54 years old:

Born into the womb of a hippu (匹婦：a woman in a very low social position who is considered stupid and worthless) on a summer's day.

=== Literary career ===
In 1902, he left Kanazawa High Elementary school (equivalent to junior high school today) and started working as a clerk at the Kanazawa Regional Court. His bosses included haiku readers such as Kawagoe Bukotsu (河越風骨) and Akakura Kinpu (赤倉錦風) who taught him to read and compose haiku poems. After numerous applications to local newspapers, his haiku was first published on October 8, 1904, in Hokkoku Shimbun. He then used the pseudonym "Terifumi" (照文). Eventually, he also started writing tanka poems.

Murō started using his pen name Saisei in 1906. The name was an attempt to compete with Kokubu Saitō, an active kanshi (Chinese poetry) writer in the Kanazawa area at the time. He chose "Saisei", engl. "West of the Sai River", which was the place he grew up (Saitō translates "East of the Sai River"), the Uho Temple located on the left side of the Sai River.

In 1913, he was invited by Kitahara Hakushu to write for Hakushu's poem collection Zanboa. He befriended Hagiwara Sakutaro through this occasion. In 1916, Saisei and Sakutaro started an unofficial magazine called Kanjo (emotions) to publish their work. They continued to publish the magazine until its 32nd issue in 1919. During the same year, Saisei had written for Chūōkōron, a renowned literary magazine in Japan. He had published the thematically connected stories Yonenjidai (Childhood), Sei ni mezameru koro (lit. "Awakening to Sexuality") and Aru shōjo no shi made (lit. "Until the Death of a Girl"), and was gaining publicity as a writer. He published his first haiku collection Gyomindouhatsu-kushu (魚眠洞発句集) in 1929.

By the 1930s, he entered his era of writing novels and published a book titled "Goodbye Poem, I am breaking up with you" in 1934 as his declaration of farewell to poetry, but he actually had composed quite a lot of poems even after this public announcement. In 1935, he received the Bungei Konwakai (Discussion Group) Award for his novel Ani imōto (Brother and Sister). He became part of the committee on the Akutagawa Prize (one of the most prestigious literature award in Japan) and continued until 1942. He also received the Kan Kikuchi award in 1941.

=== Later years ===
It was after World War II that Saisei established his status as a novelist. Anzukko (lit. "Apricot girl"), released in 1957, was a partial autobiography based on his daughter Asako. He won the Yomiuri Prize for this piece. Also in 1958, he received the Mainichi Publishing Culture Prize for his review The biography of my beloved poet. For his classic based novel Remenants from the Mayfly's diary (1959), he received the Noma Literary Prize. In the following year, he created the Muro Saisei Poet Prize from the money he received from the prize.

Murō died of cancer in 1962.

== Legacy ==
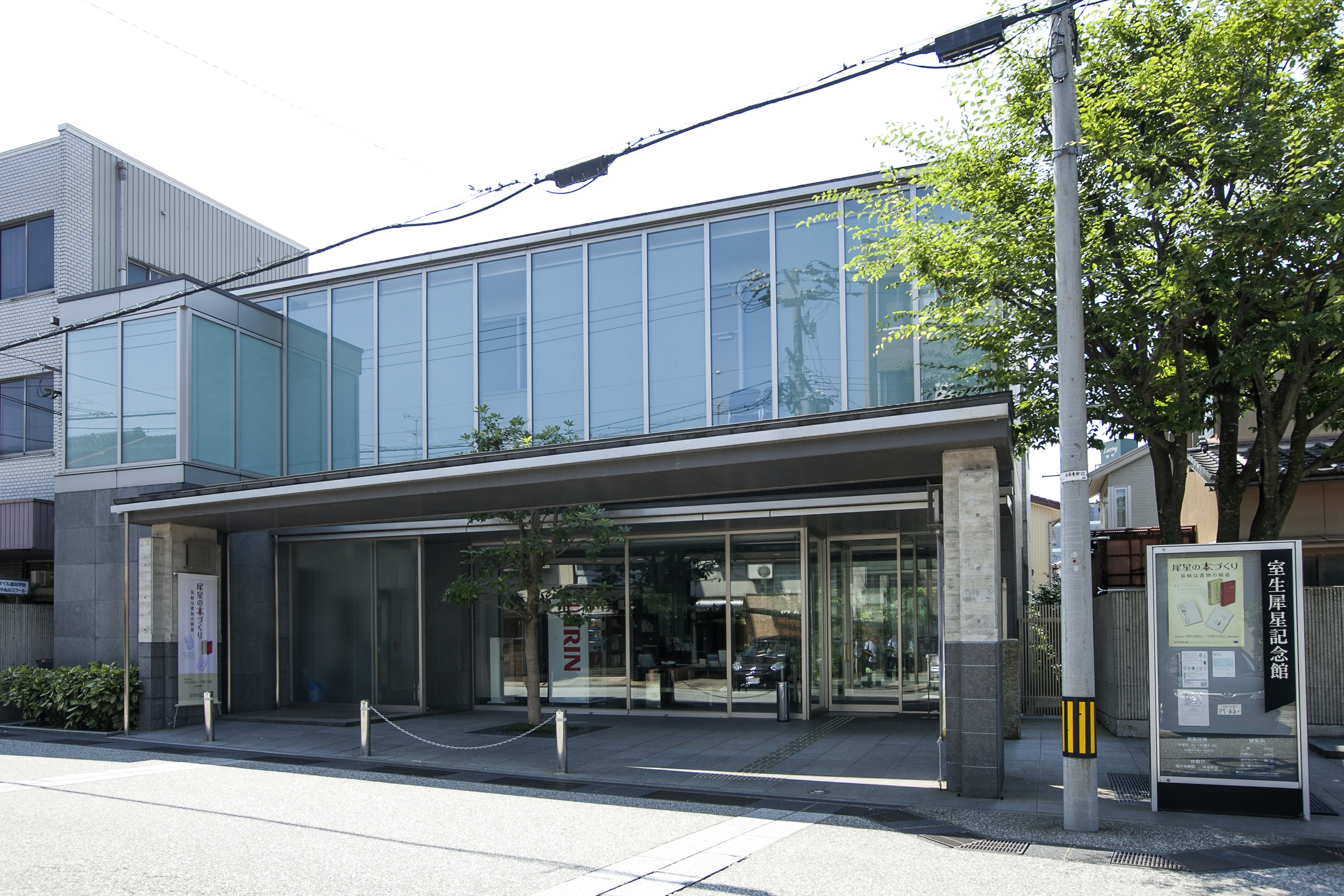
Muro Saisei Kinenkan Museum

The full collection of his literature was published both before (by publisher Hibonkaku, 1936–37, 13 Volumes plus 1 attachment) and after (by publisher Shinchosha, 1964–68, 12 Volumes plus 2 attachments) his death. For his poetry, two publishers (Chikuma Shobo, Fuyukisha) have published full collection of poems. As for his novels, his daughter Asako Muro has edited and published The Full Kingdom Story of Muro Saisei (Sakuhinsha).

A monument honoring Shusei Tokuda was erected near the summit of Mount Utatsu in 1947. The monument features writing authored by Saisei and was designed by architect Yoshirō Taniguchi.

== Selected works ==
- 1919: Childhood (Yonenjidai)
- 1919: Sei ni mezameru koro
- 1919: Aru shōjo no shi made
- 1934: Brother and Sister (Ani imotō)
- 1957: Anzukko

== Adaptations (selected) ==
Murō's work has been repeatedly adapted for film by prestigious directors like Mikio Naruse and Tadashi Imai.

- 1936: Ani imōto, dir. Sotoji Kimura
- 1953: Older Brother, Younger Sister (Ani imōto), dir. Mikio Naruse
- 1955: Mugibue, dir. Shirō Toyoda
- 1958: Anzukko, dir. Mikio Naruse
- 1976: Brother and Sister (Ani imōto), dir. Tadashi Imai
