= Sumako Matsui =

Japanese actress and singer (1886–1919)

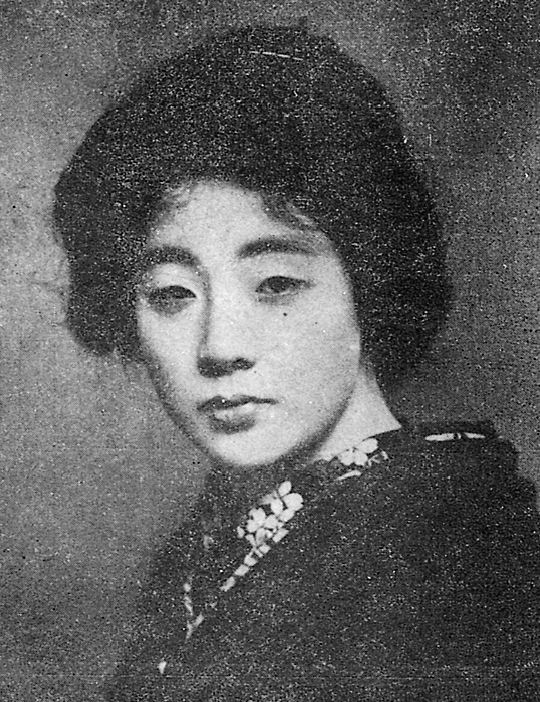
- Born: November 1, 1886; Nagano
- Died: January 5, 1919 (aged 32); Tokyo
- Other name: 松井 須磨子
- Occupation: actress

Sumako Matsui (松井 須磨子, Matsui Sumako; Japanese pronunciation: [mä̀.t͡sɨ́.í (|) sɨ́.mä̀.kò̞]; November 1, 1886 – January 5, 1919) was a Japanese actress and singer. Born as Masako Kobayashi in Matsushiro, Nagano, Nagano Prefecture as the fifth daughter and last of nine children of Tohta Kobayashi, she was adopted by the Hasegawa family in Ueda at the age of six and in 1900 graduated Ueda school. She had to return to her birth family after her adopted father died, however in the year of her return, her natural father also died. At the age of 17 she moved to Tokyo.

She married in 1903 at the arrangement of relatives but divorced within a year.

In 1908 she married Seisuke Maezawa from the same country village and in 1909 joined Shoyo Tsubouchi's newly established theatre group only to divorce Maezawa the following October 1910.

Matsui first became famous in 1911 for her portrayal of Nora in A Doll's House. In 1913 after establishing the Geijutsu-za theatre troupe with the shingeki director Hogetsu Shimamura, she became an acclaimed actress thanks to her performance in the role of Katusha in Tolstoy's Resurrection (translated by Shimamura). "Katyusha's song", written by Shinpei Nakayama, which she sang in the film, became a huge hit selling over 20,000 copies at the time. This was said to be the first ryūkōka song.

After Shimamura died of the Spanish flu on November 5, 1918, she committed suicide by hanging on January 5, 1919.

It was Matsui's wish to be buried alongside Shimamura, with whom she had been having an affair. However, this was vehemently refused by Shimamura's wife, and Matsui's wish was not to be granted. Her grave lies in the Kobayashi family plot (her birth name) in her hometown of Matsushiro. Remains are also buried in the Tamon Temple in Shinjuku, Tokyo.

The movie The Love of Sumako the Actress was produced in 1947 based on her life.
