= Epitome (film) =

1953 Japanese film

- DVD cover
- Directed by: Kaneto Shindō
- Written by: Kaneto Shindō; Shūsei Tokuda (novel)
- Produced by: Kōzaburō Yoshimura
- Starring: Nobuko Otowa; Isuzu Yamada; Sō Yamamura
- Cinematography: Takeo Itō
- Edited by: Yoshitama Imaizumi
- Music by: Akira Ifukube
- Production company: Kindai Eiga Kyōkai
- Distributed by: Shintoho
- Release date: 8 April 1953 (Japan)
- Running time: 133 minutes
- Country: Japan
- Language: Japanese

Epitome (Japanese: 縮図, Hepburn: Shukuzu), also known as Miniature, is a 1953 Japanese drama film written and directed by Kaneto Shindō, based on an unfinished novel by Shūsei Tokuda.

== Plot ==
Ginko, daughter of a poor Tokyo shoemaker, is sold to work as a geisha in a brothel in Chiba to support her family. Although made the madam after the death of the owner's wife, she suffers so much from the violence inflicted by the abusive owner, that her father buys her back. To help the family and her sick father, she starts working in a brothel in Echigo Province. There she meets Kuramochi who is seemingly willing to make Ginko his wife, but his upper-class family demands that he marries a woman of equal social status. Back in Tokyo working at still another brothel, she catches pneumonia and is carried home to die, but in the end her younger sister Tokiko dies and she lives. The last scene shows her again as a geisha, entertaining a group of customers.

== Cast ==
- Nobuko Otowa as Ginko
- Isuzu Yamada as Tamiko
- Sumiko Hidaka as Somefuku
- Sō Yamamura as Wakabayashi
- Akira Yamanouchi as Kuramochi
- Tanie Kitabayashi as Oshima
- Jūkichi Uno as Ginzō
- Taiji Tonoyama as Yamada
- Ichirō Sugai as Isogai
- Sadako Sawamura as Isogai's wife
- Osamu Takizawa as Ino
- Chikako Hosokawa as Fujikawa's owner
- Masao Shimizu as Nagase
- Yuriko Hanabusa as Kuramochi's mother
- Yōichi Numata as Kurisu

== Reception ==
In their 1959 book The Japanese Film – Art & Industry, Donald Richie and Joseph L. Anderson described Epitome as "so excessively explicit that there were parts where one could scarcely bear to look at the screen", resuming that its attempted move towards naturalism was in parts "quite successful". Comparing Epitome with Kōzaburō Yoshimura's two years earlier (and also Shindō-scripted) Clothes of Deception, film historian Alexander Jacoby saw Shindo's view of the geisha system "less resigned, and more bluntly critical".

== Legacy ==
Epitome was screened at the Berkeley Art Museum and Pacific Film Archive in 1989 and at a 2012 retrospective on Shindō and Kōzaburō Yoshimura in London, organised by the British Film Institute and the Japan Foundation.
