= Aaron Gerow =

American historian

Academic background
- Education: Columbia University (BA, MFA); University of Iowa (MA, PhD)

Academic work
- Discipline: Japanese cinema
- Institutions: Yale University

Aaron Gerow (/ˈdʒɛroʊ/) is an American historian of Japanese cinema, and a member of the faculty of Yale University where he holds a joint position between the Department of East Asian Languages and Literatures and the Film Studies Programs.

== Education ==
Gerow received both an AB (1985) and MFA (1987) in film studies from Columbia University. After this he moved to the University of Iowa, where he attained an M.A. (1991) in Asian Civilizations, followed by a Ph.D. (1996) in Communications Studies.

== Career ==
Gerow started his career in Japan as a critic and a film festival programmer. He still contributes to the ten best film poll for the magazine Eiga Geijutsu. He spent over a decade working for the Yamagata International Documentary Film Festival. He helped found its influential Asia Program, which played a critical role in the development of independent documentary in the region. Gerow spent 12 years in Japan, teaching at Yokohama National University and Meiji Gakuin University, before moving to Yale University. He was one of the founders of the Japanese film research collective Kinema Club in the early 1990s, and currently serves as editor of its editorial collective. His reviews have long been published in The Daily Yomiuri, a national English language daily published in English by one of Japan's largest newspapers, the Yomiuri Shimbun.

Gerow's scholarship is diverse. A theoretically informed approach to history, it covers over a century of film history and many different genres. His books include a single-film analysis (on A Page of Madness), a director study (Kitano Takeshi), a study of early cinema, and a research guide co-wrote with Abé Mark Nornes. He is editor or co-editor of several books, notably a collection of essays by the Japanese film scholar and collector Makino Mamoru and a special issue of the Review of Japanese Culture and Society entitled "Decentering Theory: Reconsidering the History of Japanese Film Theory." He has been published in diverse outlets such as the Asia-Pacific Journal. His work is often cited in academic writing.

Gerow's most influential work is Visions of Japanese modernity. Previous histories of prewar Japanese cinema tend to focus either on the influence of traditional culture on cinema (most notably Noel Burch's To the Distant Observer), or the impact of western modernity on the local film culture. Instead, Gerow carefully examines the struggles of defining the medium in this time of flux, particularly those around the Pure Film Movement of the 1910s. With few extant films to analyze, Gerow offers a rich and innovative look at early film criticism and theory, exhibition practices such as the benshi and censorship laws. In a published book review in the University of Southern California film journal Spectator, media scholar Annie Manion wrote "Aaron Gerow’s influence and importance in the field of Japanese film and media studies cannot be overstated."

== Selected works ==
- Nornes, Mark Howard; Gerow, Aaron, eds. (2001). In praise of film studies : essays in honor of Makino Mamoru. Victoria: Trafford Publ. ISBN 9781552126400.
- Gerow, Aaron (2007). Kitano Takeshi (1. publ. ed.). London: British Film Inst. ISBN 9781844571666.
- Gerow, Aaron (2008). A Page of Madness: cinema and modernity in 1920s Japan. Ann Arbor: Center for Japanese Studies, the University of Michigan. ISBN 9781929280520.
- Nornes, Abé Mark; Gerow, Aaron (2009). Research guide to Japanese film studies. Ann Arbor: Center for Japanese Studies, The University of Michigan. ISBN 9781929280544.
- "Decentering Theory: Reconsidering the History of Japanese Film Theory". Review of Japanese Culture and Society (22). December 2010.
- Gerow, Aaron (2010). Visions of Japanese modernity : articulations of cinema, nation, and spectatorship, 1895-1925. Berkeley: University of California Press. ISBN 9780520254565.
