= Muro Saisei Kinenkan Museum =

Museum in Kanazawa, Ishikawa, Japan

- 室生犀星記念館
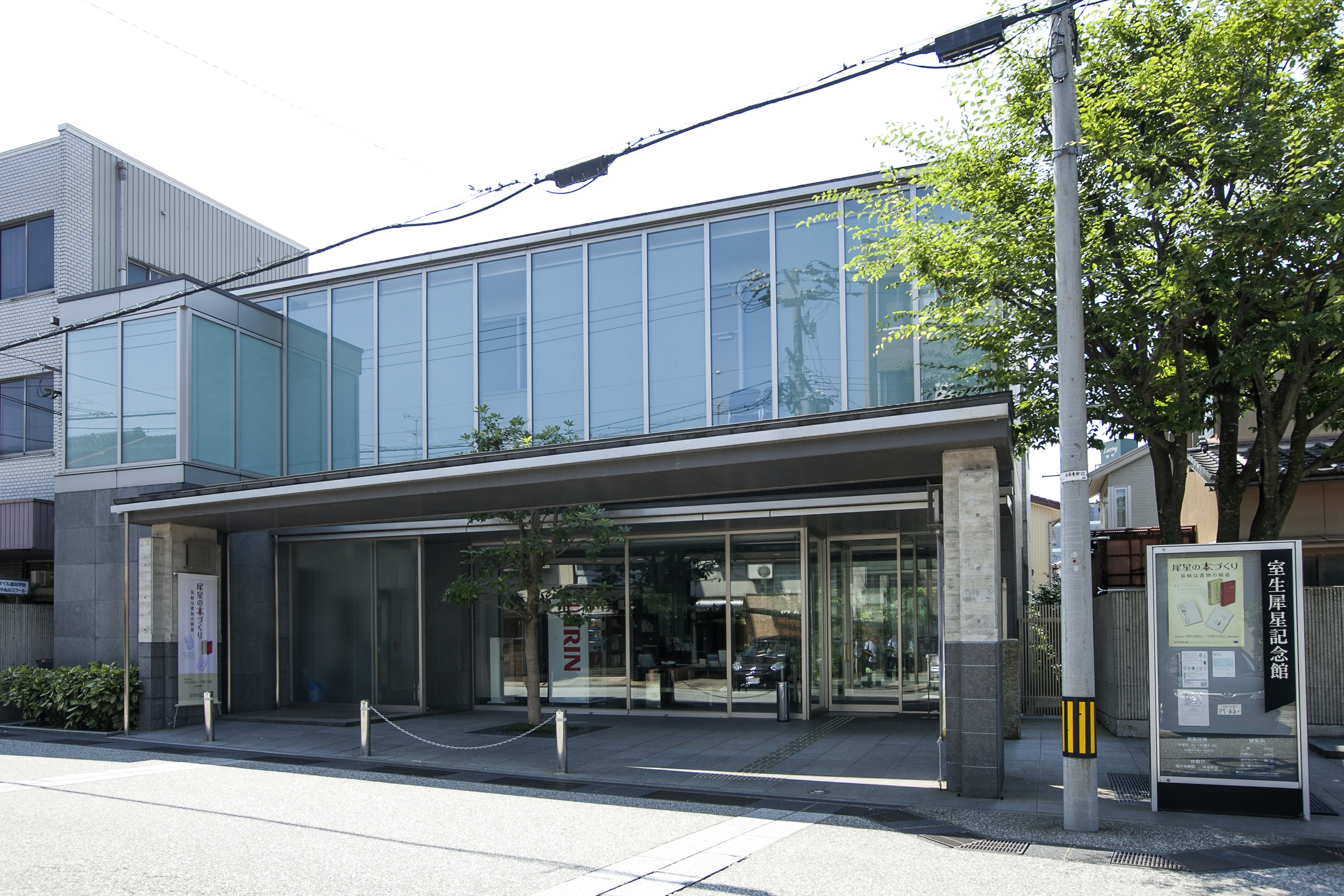
- Established: 1 August 2002
- Location: Kanazawa, Ishikawa, Japan
- Coordinates: 36°33′33″N 136°38′53″E
- Type: museum
- Website: Official website

The Muro Saisei Kinenkan Museum (Japanese: 室生犀星記念館) is a museum in Kanazawa, Ishikawa Prefecture, Japan. The museum is about the Japanese poet Murō Saisei.

== History ==
The museum was established on 1 August 2002.

== Architecture ==
The museum building was built at the birthplace of Saisei.

== Exhibitions ==
The museum exhibits Saisei's collections on his works, manuscripts and articles.

== See also ==
- List of museums in Japan
