= Toyokuni Shrine (Kanazawa) =

Shinto shrine in Kanazawa, Ishikawa, Japan

Toyokuni Shrine 豊国神社
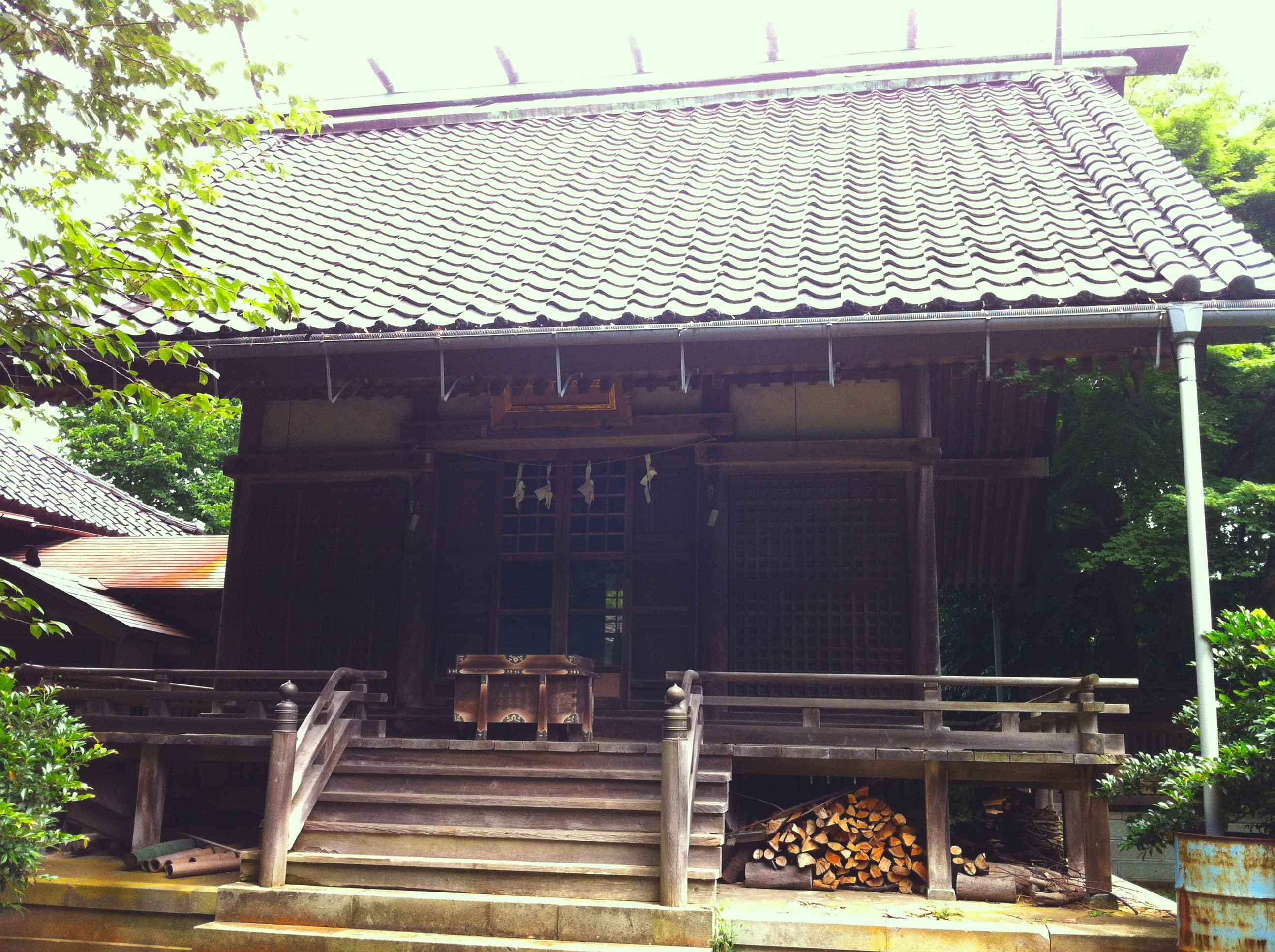
- Toyokuni Shrine

- Location within Japan

Religion
- Affiliation: Shinto
- Deity: Toyotomi Hideyoshi, Maeda Toshitsune
- Type: Village shrine

Location
- Location: Higashi-Mikage-machi, Kanazawa, Ishikawa Prefecture, Japan
- Coordinates: 36°34′11″N 136°40′25″E

Architecture
- Founder: Maeda Toshitsune
- Established: 1616

Toyokuni Shrine (豊国神社, Toyokuni-jinja) is a Shinto shrine located on Mount Utatsu in Higashi-Mikage-machi, Kanazawa, Ishikawa Prefecture, Japan. Under the shrine ranking system, it was listed as a village shrine. Its annual festival day is May 2.

The shrine is dedicated to both Toyotomi Hideyoshi and Maeda Toshitsune, the founder of Kaga Domain. It is located near two other shrines, Utatsu Shrine (a Tenman-gū) and Atago Shrine, and together they are known as the "Mount Utatsu Three Shrines".

== History ==
Based on the dying wish of Maeda Toshiie, Maeda Toshitsune secretly enshrined a figure of Toyotomi Hideyoshi on the grounds of a Buddhist temple on Mount Utatsu in 1616. It became a village shrine in 1873. In 1887, the shrine was moved to the town of Tono (now Owari-chō in Kanazawa). The shrine was moved to its present location in 1908, when it was also renamed Toyokuni Shrine.
