= Oyama Shrine (Kanazawa) =

Shinto shrine in Ishikawa Prefecture, Japan

- 尾山神社
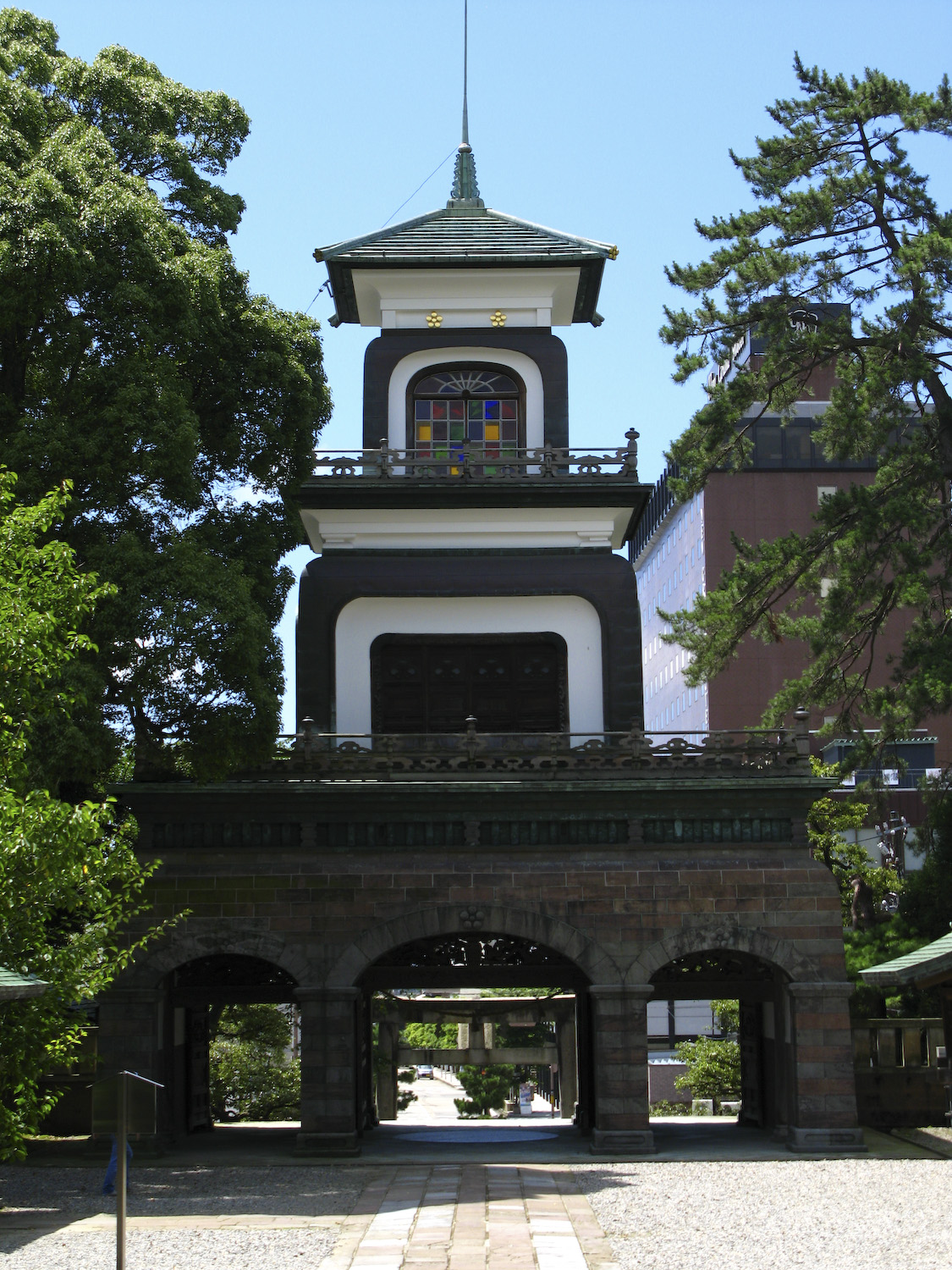
- Main gate

- Location within Japan

Religion
- Affiliation: Shinto

Location
- Location: Kanazawa, Ishikawa, Japan.
- Coordinates: 36°33′59″N 136°39′19″E

Architecture
- Established: 1599

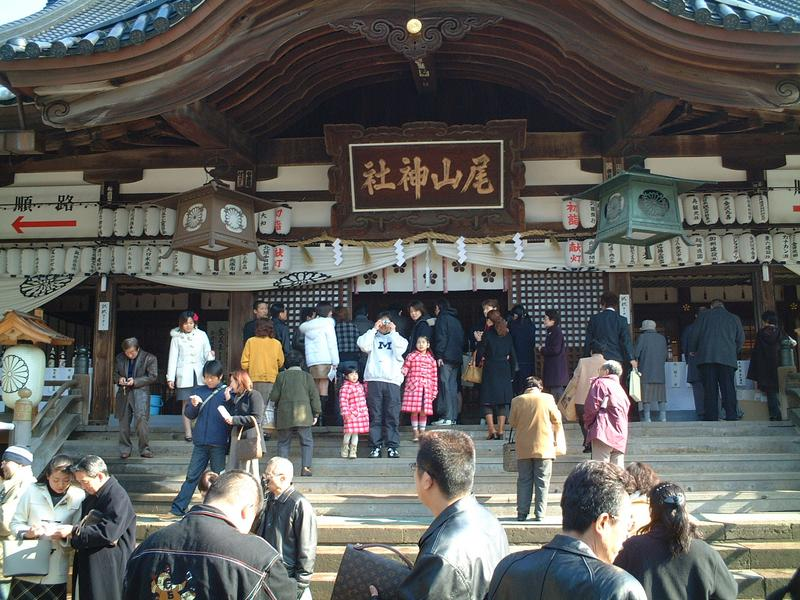
Oyama-jinja

Oyama Shrine (尾山神社, Oyama-jinja) is a Shinto shrine in Kanazawa, Ishikawa, Japan.

The shrine was established in 1599, dedicated to Maeda Toshiie (the first lord of Kaga Domain), in Utatsu-yama (卯辰山), east of Kanazawa. It was moved to its present location in 1873 and renamed to Oyama-jinja. The main gate was constructed in 1875. This gate is a peculiar mix of traditional Japanese, Chinese, and European religious architectural elements. The gate is 25 metres (82 ft) high including the lightning rod. The third floor is particular famous for its Dutch stained-glass windows. It is said that the third floor was also used as a lighthouse. The gate was designated an Important Cultural Property on May 13, 1935.
