= Sō Yamamura =

Japanese actor (1910–2000)

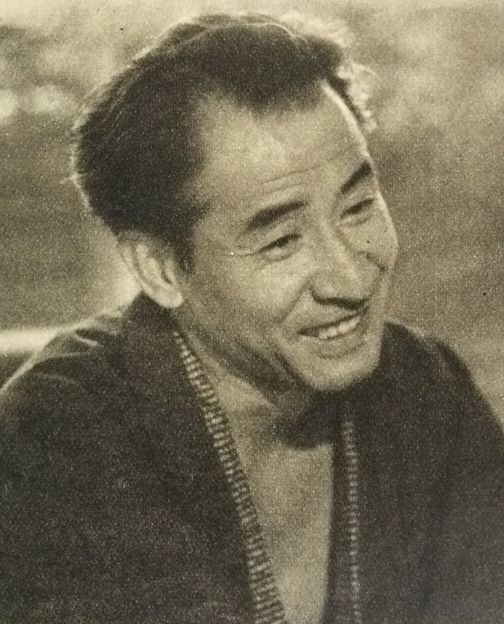
- Born: Koga Hirosada; 24 February 1910; Tenri, Japan
- Died: 26 May 2000 (aged 90); Tokyo, Japan
- Other name: Satoshi Yamamura
- Occupation: Actor
- Years active: 1936–1997

Sō Yamamura (山村聰, Yamamura Sō; 24 February 1910 – 26 May 2000), sometimes credited as Satoshi Yamamura, was a Japanese actor and film director.

== Biography ==
Yamamura was born Koga Hirosada in Tenri, Nara Prefecture, and graduated from the University of Tokyo. In 1942, Yamamura and Isao Yamagata formed the Bunkaza Theatre Company.

He began his career as a screen actor in 1946 and appeared in over one hundred films between 1947 and 1997. In 1953, he debuted as a director with his film Kanikōsen, the first of six films he directed. Yamamura was introduced to Western audiences in the 1958 film The Barbarian and the Geisha. In the US, he is well known for his portrayals of Japanese Admiral Isoroku Yamamoto of the Combined Fleet in Tora! Tora! Tora!, and of Mr. Sakamoto, the CEO of Assan Motors in Gung Ho.

Yamamura appeared in many jidaigeki television dramas. He played the role of Tokugawa Ieyasu in the taiga drama Haru no Sakamichi in 1971. His major historical roles were Yagyū Munenori in the 1978 The Yagyu Conspiracy and Hoshina Masayuki in the 1980 Shadow Warriors. In addition to historical parts, he appeared in fictional series. He portrayed Otowaya Hanemon in the Hissatsu series Hissatsu Shikakenin, resprising the character in the film series later.

== Selected filmography ==
=== Films ===
- Inochi Arukagiri (1946)
- Chikagai nijuyojikan (1947)
- The Love of the Actress Sumako (1947) - Hōgetsu Shimamura
- Daini no jinsei (1948)
- Taifuken no onna (1948)
- Onna no tatakai (1949)
- Kirare no Senta (1949)
- Ryusei (1949)
- Shojo takara (1950) - Yoshitaro Hanawa
- Yoshitaro Hanawa (1950) - Ryosuke Izumi
- The Munekata Sisters (1950) - Ryosuke Mimura, Setsuko's husband
- Portrait of Madame Yuki (1950) - Tateoka
- Kikyō (1950) - Ongi
- Senka o koete (1950)
- Hirate Miki (1951)
- Eriko to tomoni - Dai ichi-bu (1951) - Sōtarō
- Eriko to tomo ni: Dai ni-bu (1951) - Sōtarō
- Jiyū gakkō (1951) - Taku Henmi
- Dare ga watashi o sabaku no ka (1951)
- Sekirei no kyoku (1951)
- Dancing Girl (1951) - Motoo Yagi
- The Lady of Musashino (1951) - Eiji Ono
- Hibari no komoriuta (1951)
- Repast (1951)
- Seishun kaigi (1952) - Haruki Eda
- Okuni to Gohei (1952) - Tomonojo
- Kin no tamago: Golden girl (1952)
- Kon'na watashi ja nakatta ni (1952) - Takeshi Yajima
- Gendai-jin (1952)
- Choito neesan omoide yanagi (1952) - Koshimura
- Ashi ni sawatta onna (1952) - Yasukichi Sakaza
- Oka wa hanazakari (1952) - Ryōzō Noro
- Ringo-en no shōjo (1952)
- My Wonderful Yellow Car (1953) - The husband
- Mura hatibu (1953)
- Epitome (1953) - Wakabayashi
- Kanikōsen (1953) – Matsuki (also dir.)
- Tokyo Story (1953) - Koichi Hirayama
- An Inlet of Muddy Water (1953) – Asanosuke (episode 3 "Troubled Waters")
- Nihon yaburezu (1954)
- Sound of the Mountain (1954) - Ogata Shingo
- Dobu (1954) – Businessman
- Moeru Shanghai (1954) - Shōfū Muramatsu
- Kakute yume ari (1954) - Takashi Shōkōchi
- Karatachi no hana (1954) - Chotaro Kitahara
- Otsukisama ni wa warui kedo (1954) - Yā-san
- Kuroi ushio (1954) (also dir.)
- Aisureba koso (1955) - Gorō (segment 3)
- Ai no onimotsu (1955)
- Yuki no koi (1955)
- Seishun kaidan (1955) - Tetsuya, father of Chiharu
- Princess Yang Kwei-Fei (1955) - An Lushan
- Till We Meet Again (1955) - Daisuke Kaji
- Sara no hana no toge (1955) - Gunnoshin Sakakibara
- Early Spring (1956) - Yutaka Kawai
- Mahiru no ankoku (1956) - Yuji
- Tsukigata Hanpeita: Hana no maki; Arashi no maki (1956) - Kogoro Katsura
- Yonjū-hassai no teikō (1956) - Kotaro Nishimura
- Typhoon Over Nagasaki (1957) - Hori
- Tokyo Twilight (1957) - Seki Sekiguchi
- Jigoku bana (1957) - Umasuke
- Chieko-sho (1957) - Kotaro Takamura
- Yoru no chō (1957) - Ichiro Shirosawa
- Hatsukoi monogatari (1957) - Shōhei Ganmaru
- The Hole (1957) - Keikichi Shirasu
- Bakuon to daichi (1957)
- Doshaburi (1957) - Okubo, Father of Tanes children
- Do no hājiki wa jigokū dazē (1958)
- Anzukko (1958) - Heishiro Hirayama - the father
- Hibari no hanagata tantei kassen (1958)
- The Barbarian and the Geisha (1958) - Governor Tamura
- Muhō gai no yarō domo (1959)
- Jigokū no sokō made tsuki auzē (1959)
- Ningen no jōken (1959) - Okishima
- Chūshingura: ōka no maki, kikka no maki (1959)
- Hahakogusa (1959) - Mr Fujiki
- Shingo jūban shōbu: dai-ni-bu (1959)
- Yami o yokogire (1959) - Takazawa
- Tatsumaki bugyō (1959)
- Jan Arima no shūgeki (1959) - Saburobei Obata
- Shōri to haiboku (1960) - Kimpei Minegishi
- Zoku beran me-e geisha (1960)
- Arega minato no hi da (1961)
- Hatamoto kenka taka (1961) - Suruganokami Koyama
- Gonin no totsugeki tai (1961) - Gen. Mayor Soje
- Fundoshi isha (1961) - Dr. Meikai Ikeda
- Waga koi no tabiji (1961)
- The Littlest Warrior (1961) - Fujiwara No Morozane (voice)
- Onna wa nido umareru (1961) - Kiyomasa Tsutsui
- Haitoku no mesu (1961) - Naoyuki Nishizawa
- Netsuai sha (1961) - Murai
- The Last War (1961) - Prime Minister
- Boku wa jigoku no tehinshi da (1961)
- Katei no jijō (1962) - Heitaro Misawa
- The Inheritance (1962) - Senzō
- Musume to watashi (1962) - Shiro Iwatani
- Taiheiyō Sensō to Himeyuri Butai (1962)
- Akitsu Springs (1962) - Mikami
- Star of Hong Kong (1962) - Gentarō Sugimoto
- Namida o shishi no tategami ni (1962) - Kōhei Matsudaira
- Fūten Rōjin nikki (1962) - Tokusuke Rōjin
- Born in Sin (1962) - Shinzō Tagaya
- Yama no sanka: moyuru wakamono tachi (1962)
- Zoku shinobi no mono (1963)
- Gyangu Chūshingura (1963)
- Kizudarake no sanga (1964) - Kappei Arima
- Ane to imōto (1965) - Yoshirō Takaoka
- Nikutai no gakko (1965) - Toshinobu Hira
- With Beauty and Sorrow (1965) - Toshio Ōki
- Taiheiyō kiseki no sakusen: Kisuka (1965) - Kawashima
- Japan's Longest Day (1967) - Mitsumasa Yonai
- The Militarists (1970) - Mitsumasa Yonai
- Tora! Tora! Tora! (1970) - Admiral Isoroku Yamamoto
- Lone Wolf and Cub: Baby Cart in Peril (1972) - Gōmune Jindaiyu
- Hissatsu Shikakenin (1973) - Han'emon Otowaya
- Hissatsu Shikakenin Baian Arijigoku (1973) - Hanemon Otowaya
- Hissatsu Shikakenin Shunsetsu shikakebari (1974) - Hanemon Otowaya
- Prophecies of Nostradamus (1974) - Prime Minister Kuroki
- Dōmyaku rettō (1975) - Nagata
- Shag (1978) - Head of Maritime Safety Agency
- Kage no Gundan: Hattori Hanzo (1979)
- Nankyoku Monogatari (1983) - Iwakiri Sencho
- Nidaime wa Christian (1985) - Nakatsugawa
- Gung Ho (1986) - Mr. Sakamoto
- Yoshiwara enjō (1987) - Isaburo Okura
- Code Name Black Cat o oe (1987) - Superintendent Supervisor Amano
- Godzilla vs. King Ghidorah (1991) - Prime Minister
- Going West: To the West (1997)

=== Television ===
- Haru no Sakamichi (1971) - Tokugawa Ieyasu
- Hissatsu Shikakenin (1972) - Otowaya Hanemon
- The Water Margin (1973) - Lu Junyi
- Tasukenin Hashiru (1973–1974) - Seibei
- Karei-naru Ichizoku (1974–75) - Daisuke Manpyo
- The Yagyu Conspiracy (1978) - Yagyū Munenori
- Akō Rōshi (1979) - Chisaka Hyōbu
- Hattori Hanzō:Kage no Gundan (1980) - Hoshina Masayuki
- Yagyu Abaretabi (1980–81) - Yagyū Munenori
- Yagyu Jyubei Abaretabi (1982–83) - Yagyū Munenori
- Ōoku (1983) - Arai Hakuseki
- Seibu Keisatsu partIII Daimon sisu Otokotachiyo Eienni (1984) (Final episode)- Saeki
- Tsūkai! Kōchiyama Sōshun (1975–1976) - Mizuno Tadakuni

== Honours ==
- Medal with Purple Ribbon (1977)
- Order of the Rising Sun, 4th Class, Gold Rays with Rosette (1983)
