= Hōgetsu Shimamura =

Japanese critic and novelist

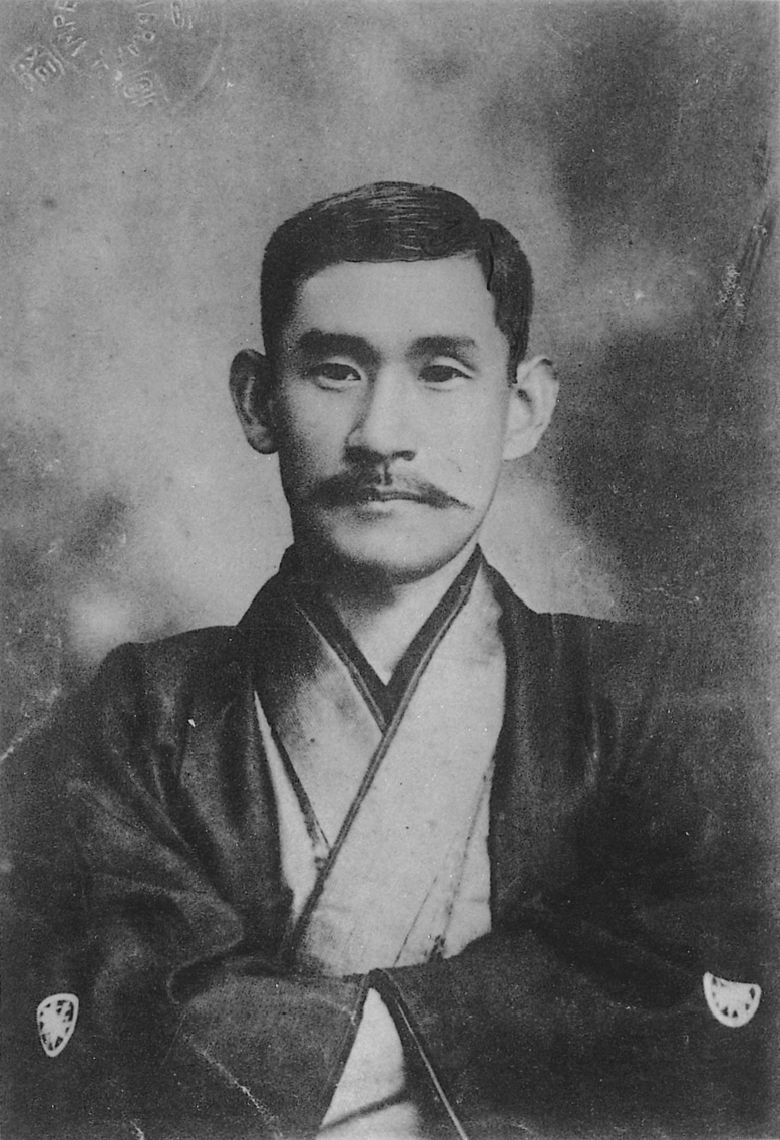
Hōgetsu Shimamura circa 1917

Hōgetsu Shimamura (島村 抱月, Shimamura Hōgetsu; February 28, 1871 - November 5, 1918)) was a Japanese critic, novelist and leader of Shingeki. His real name is Takitaro (滝太郎). He was born in Shimane Prefecture. He graduated from Tōkyō Senmon Gakkō. In 1902 he studied abroad in the United Kingdom and Germany. In 1906, he founded the Bungei Kyōkai (文芸協会) with Tsubouchi Shoyo. He presided over Waseda Bungaku (早稲田文学) and was active in the naturalistic literary movement. In 1913, he established the Geijutsu-za theatre troupe with Sumako Matsui. His main works are Shinbijigaku (新美辞学), Kindai Bungei no Kenkyu (近代文芸之研究) and so on. Shimamura was also a key figure in Henrik Ibsen becoming a key influence in Japanese drama and the Shingeki movement; following a three and a half year stay in Europe and having attended many performances of Ibsen plays, Shimamura returned to Japan in 1905 and declared an "Age of Ibsen" to coincide with increased interest in Ibsen plays within Japan, including Shimamura's own translation of A Doll's House.
