= Anzukko =

1958 Japanese film

- Theatrical release poster

Japanese name
- Kanji: 杏っ子
- Directed by: Mikio Naruse
- Written by: Mikio Naruse; Sumie Tanaka; Saisei Murō (novel)
- Produced by: Tomoyuki Tanaka
- Starring: Sō Yamamura; Kyōko Kagawa; Isao Kimura; Shizue Natsukawa
- Cinematography: Masao Tamai
- Edited by: Eiji Ooi
- Music by: Ichirō Saitō
- Production company: Toho
- Distributed by: Toho
- Release date: 13 May 1958 (Japan)
- Running time: 109 minutes
- Country: Japan
- Language: Japanese

Anzukko (Japanese: 杏っ子), also known as Little Peach, is a 1958 Japanese drama film directed by Mikio Naruse. It is based on a novel by Saisei Murō.

== Plot ==
Kyōko, daughter of successful writer Hirayama, rejects several marriage prospects before taking Ryōkichi, owner of a small used book store, as her husband. A few years into the marriage, Kyōko has to start selling parts of the household, as the manuscripts of Ryōkichi, who is ambitious to become a novelist, keep getting returned by publishers. Yagihara, a magazine editor and acquaintance of Hirayama, outspokenly tells Ryōkichi that his work lacks originality and an elaborate style. Kyōko suggests that Ryōkichi shows his manuscripts to her father, but he declines, arguing that it is Hirayama's overpowering presence which hinders him in his writing. Ryōkichi's behaviour becomes increasingly erratic due to his drinking, and the couple's financial and emotional situation worsens. Kyōko repeatedly leaves her home to stay at her father's place, but insists that a divorce is the final resort. When Kyōko again returns to Ryōkichi, the mother asks Hirayama if they shouldn't split up. Hirayama replies, only when Kyōko comes home exhausted and can't go on anymore, the time to split up has come.

== Cast ==
- Sō Yamamura as Heishiro Hirayama
- Kyōko Kagawa as Kyōko
- Isao Kimura as Ryōkichi, Kyōko's husband
- Shizue Natsukawa as Rieko, Hirayama's wife
- Hiroshi Tachikawa as Heinosuke, Hirayama's son
- Chieko Nakakita as Sumiko Urushiyama
- Mina Mitsui as Risako Yamamoto
- Nobuo Nakamura as Toshio Yagihara
- Keiju Kobayashi as Tayama
- Daisuke Katō as Suga, the poet
- Natsuko Kahara as Enko Murai
- Sadako Sawamura as Mrs. Hatoi
- Kenji Sahara as Mrs. Hatoi's son
- Hiroshi Hayashi as Dr. Sato
- Minoru Chiaki as Saburo Yoshida
- Teruko Mita as Sachiko Yoshida
- Yoshio Tsuchiya as Ishima
- Yū Fujiki as Okada

== Reception ==
In his 2005 review for Slant Magazine, Keith Uhlich called Anzukko "a loving portrait of a woman tragically caught between her wants and her responsibilities, fated to tread a potentially never-ending path between the trials of her marriage and the refuge of her past."
