= Shūsei Tokuda =

Japanese writer (1872–1943)

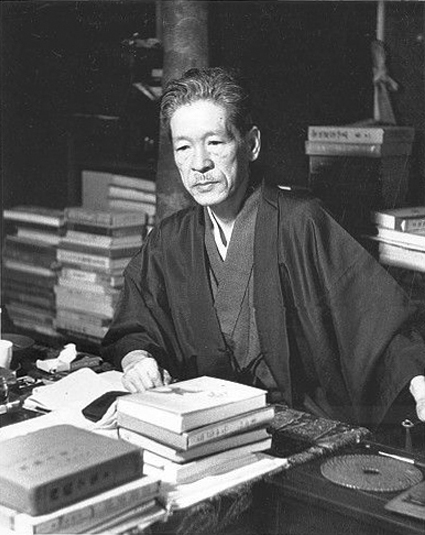
- Shūsei Tokuda
- Born: 1 February 1872; Kanazawa, Ishikawa, Japan
- Died: 18 November 1943 (aged 71); Tokyo, Japan
- Occupation: Writer
- Writing career
- Movement: Naturalism

Shūsei Tokuda (徳田秋声, Tokuda Shūsei; 1 February 1872 – 18 November 1943, real name Sueo Tokuda) was a Japanese writer.

== Life ==
Tokuda was born in Kanazawa in Ishikawa Prefecture. Coming from a family of the former feudal nobility, Tokuda began his literary life as a follower of the writer Ozaki Kōyō, who was four years his senior and had already established himself as a literary man in the late 1880s. Their relationship wasn't to last long, though, with Kōyō dying in 1903, after which Tokuda began to move from Kōyō's style of romanticism into a mixture of naturalism and the confessional known as "Shizen-shugi", an example of which is his 1908 novel Arajotai (新世帯), which dealt with the frustrations of a young working-class couple.

After the publication of Ashiato (足迹) in 1910, Tokuda would release his most autobiographical work, Kabi (黴), in 1911, a classic example of the Japanese genre known as the "I-novel". He followed with the novel Rough Living (Arakure, あらくれ) in 1915.

After the death of his wife in 1926, Tokuda began a series of relationships with younger women, which would inspire his later works, especially his best-known, Kasō jinbutsu (仮装人物), released from 1935 to 1938, as well as the unfinished Shukuzu (縮図) from 1941.

== Legacy ==
A number of Tokuda's works were adapted into films in Japan. A monument honoring Tokuda was erected near the summit of Mount Utatsu in 1947. The monument features writing authored by poet Murō Saisei and was designed by architect Yoshirō Taniguchi.

== Selected works ==
- 1910: Ashiato
- 1911: Kabi
- 1915: Rough Living (Arakure)
- 1933: The Town's Dance Hall (Machi no odoriba)
- 1935: Order of the White Paulownia (Kunshō)
- 1935–1938: Kasō jinbutsu
- 1941: Shukuzu (unfinished)

== Bibliography ==
- Tokuda, Shusei (2001). Rough Living. Translated by Torrance, Richard. University of Hawaii Press. ISBN 0824823877.
- Rimer, J. Thomas, ed. (2005). "The Town's Dance Hall". The Columbia Anthology of Modern Japanese Literature: Volume 1: From Restoration to Occupation, 1868-1945. Columbia University Press.
- Morris, Ivan, ed. (1962). "Order of the White Paulownia". Modern Japanese Stories: An Anthology. ISBN 0804833362.
- Torrance, Richard (1994). The Fiction of Tokuda Shusei, and the Emergence of Japan's New Middle Class. Washington University Press.

== Adaptations (selected) ==
- 1953: Epitome (Shukuzu), director Kaneto Shindō
- 1957: Untamed (Arakure), director Mikio Naruse
- 1962: Stolen Pleasure (Tadare), director Yasuzō Masumura

== See also ==
- Kiryū Yūyū, long-time friend of Tokuda
