= The Love of Sumako the Actress =

The Love of the Actress Sumako
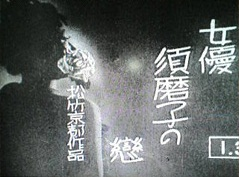
- Directed by: Kenji Mizoguchi
- Written by: Yoshikata Yoda; Hideo Nagata (play)
- Produced by: Toshio Itoya
- Starring: Kinuyo Tanaka; Sō Yamamura
- Cinematography: Minoru Miki
- Edited by: Shintarō Miyamoto
- Music by: Hisato Osawa
- Production company: Shochiku
- Distributed by: Shochiku
- Release date: 16 August 1947
- Running time: 96 minutes
- Country: Japan
- Language: Japanese

The Love of Sumako the Actress (女優須磨子の恋, Joyū Sumako no koi) is a 1947 Japanese drama film directed by Kenji Mizoguchi. The film is based on a play by Hideo Nagata and portrays the life story of actress Sumako Matsui.

== Cast ==
- Kinuyo Tanaka as Sumako Matsui
- Sō Yamamura as Hōgetsu Shimamura
- Kikue Mōri as Ichiko Shimamura
- Chieko Higashiyama as Seki
- Kyoko Asagiri as Haruko Shimamura
- Eijirō Tōno as Tsubouchi Shōyō
- Eitarō Ozawa as Kichizô Nakamura
