= Shinpa =

Japanese form of theater

Shinpa (新派) (also rendered shimpa) is a modern form of theater in Japan usually featuring melodramatic stories, contrasted with the more traditional kabuki style. Taking its start in the 1880s, it later spread to cinema.

== Art form ==
Theatre historians have characterized shinpa as a transitional movement, closely associated with the Meiji restoration, whose primary rationale was the rejection of "old" values in favor of material that would appeal to a partially westernized urban middle class which still maintained some traditional habits of thought. Some of the innovations associated with shinpa included shortened performance times, the re-introduction of female performers to the stage, the abolition of teahouses that had previously controlled ticket sales, and the frequent adaptation of western classics, such as the plays of Shakespeare and The Count of Monte Cristo. It eventually earned the name shinpa (literally meaning "new school") to contrast it from kyūha ("old school" or kabuki) due its more contemporary and realistic stories. Social and political struggles became new dramatic subjects, as did patriotic events. Aesthetically, shinpa performances distinguished themselves by darkened auditoriums, orchestra areas and scenery changes, and elaborate stage lighting.

== History ==
The roots of shinpa can be traced to a form of agitation propaganda theater in the 1880s promoted by Liberal Party members Sadanori Sudō and Otojirō Kawakami. After the dissolution of the Liberal Party in 1884, Sudō became a founding member of the Dainippon geigeki kyōfūkai ("Great Japan society for the reformation of theatre") as a means of an opposition against the conservative government, but its impact was only modest. Kawakami formed his own theatre troupe in 1891 and celebrated his biggest success with the patriotic play Kawakami Otojirō semchi kenbunki ("Kawakami Otojirō reports from the battlefield"), which thematised Japan's victory in the First Sino-Japanese War. Beginning in 1903, Kawakami and his wife Yakko Sada, who both had previously appeared on stage in Europe, introduced plays by Shakespeare, Maurice Maeterlinck and Victorien Sardou to Japanese audiences.

As a theatrical form, shinpa was most successful in the early 1900s as the works of novelists such as Kyōka Izumi, Kōyō Ozaki, and Roka Tokutomi were adapted for the stage. Notable groups were the Seibikan, the Seibidan, the Isamiengeki and the Hongōza, and actors like Yōhō Ii, Minoru Takada and Rokurō Kitamura grew to fame and shaped the new movement. Although only short-lived, the Seibidan troupe was successful with a more conservative form that was closer to kabuki than to the later shingeki ("new drama") because of its continued use of onnagata and off-stage music.

On the stage, shinpa was less successful after the Taishō era, but playwrights such as Matsutarō Kawaguchi, actresses like Yaeko Mizutani and actors like Kitamura and Shōtarō Hanayagi helped keep the form alive. Shinpa also had an influence on modern Korean theater through the shinp’a (신파) genre.

== Spread to cinema ==
With the introduction of cinema in Japan, shinpa became one of the first film genres in opposition again to kyūha films, as many films were based on shinpa plays. Some shinpa stage actors like Masao Inoue were heavily involved in film, and a form called rensageki ("chain drama") appeared which mixed film (for exterior scenes) and theater on stage. With the rise of the reformist Pure Film Movement in the 1910s, which strongly criticized shinpa films for their melodramatic tales of women suffering from the strictures of class and social prejudice, films about contemporary subjects eventually were called gendaigeki in opposition to historical jidaigeki by the 1920s, even though shinpa stories continued to be made into films for decades to come.

== See also ==
- Theatre of Japan
- Cinema of Japan
