= Mount Utatsu =

Mountain in Ishikawa prefecture, Japan

- 卯辰山
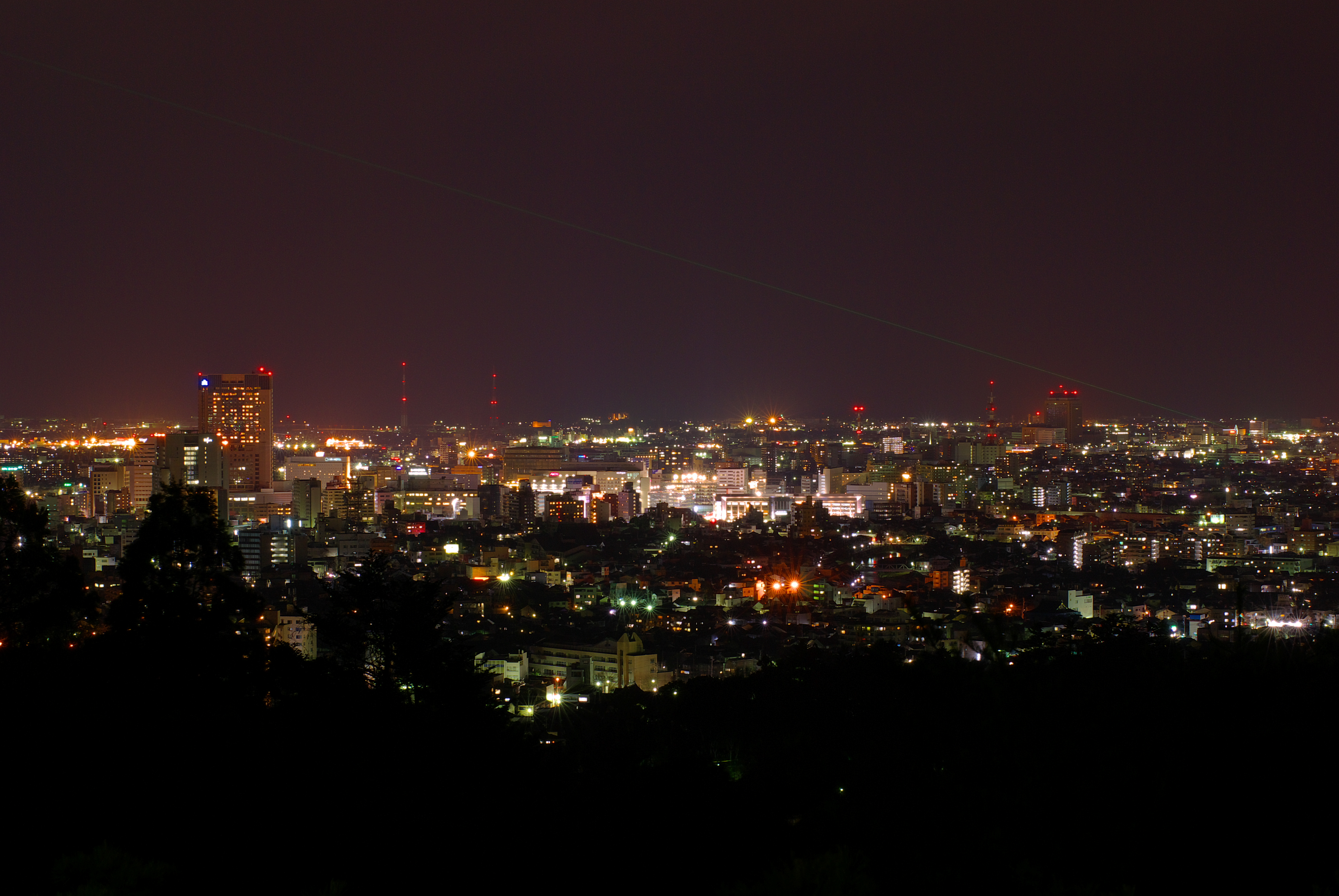
- View from Mount Utatsu of downtown Kanazawa.

Highest point
- Elevation: 149 m (489 ft)
- Prominence: 33 m (108 ft)
- Listing: Mountains of Japan
- Coordinates: 36°34′24″N 136°40′40″E

Naming
- Language of name: Japanese

Geography
- Location within Japan
- Location: Japan

Mount Utatsu (卯辰山, Utatsu-yama) is a mountain in Kanazawa, Ishikawa Prefecture, Japan. It is also known by a number of other names, including Mount Mukai (向山, Mukai-yama), Mount Mukō (夢香山, Mukō-yama), Mount Garyū (臥竜山, Garyū-zan), and Mount Kasuga (春日山, Kasuga-yama). It is visible to the east of Kanazawa Castle and has Toyokuni Shrine located on its slopes.

The summit of Mount Utatsu is used as a secondary triangulation point (named "Kanazawa") by the Geographical Survey Institute of Japan.

== History ==
During the Bunsei era, Aoki Mokubei established the Kasuga kiln which revitalized the Kutani ware ceramics production of the area.

Because Mount Utatsu overlooks Kanazawa Castle, commoners were forbidden from climbing it during the Edo period. This led to the Ansei Tearful Insurrection in July 1858, a riot of over 2000 peasants during which the seven ringleaders were executed.

In 1947, a monument honoring author Shusei Tokuda was erected near the summit of Mount Utatsu. It featured writing authored by poet Murō Saisei and was designed by architect Yoshirō Taniguchi.

In 1958, a zoo and an aquarium were opened as part of recreational facilities attached to the Kanazawa Health Center, but they were closed in 1993.

The Prefectural Utatsuyama Sumo Ring was opened on the mountain in 1960 as a joint facility for high schools and Kanazawa University.
