= Kiryū Yūyū =

Japanese journalist and activist (1873–1941)

- 桐生悠々
- Kiryū Yūyū while working at The Shinano Mainichi Shimbun
- Born: Kiryū Masaji; May 20, 1873; Kanazawa, Ishikawa, Empire of Japan
- Died: September 10, 1941 (aged 68); Nagoya, Aichi, Empire of Japan
- Burial place: Tama Cemetery, Tokyo
- Education: Tokyo Imperial University
- Occupation: Journalist
- Years active: 1900–1941
- Spouse: Suzu Fujie (m. 1902)
- Children: 11

Kiryū Yūyū (Japanese: 桐生悠々; May 20, 1873 – September 10, 1941), born as Kiryū Masaji (桐生 政次), was a Japanese journalist and activist. He worked as the editor-in-chief for The Shinano Mainichi Shimbun (1910–1914; 1928–1933) and Shin Aichi (now the Chunichi Shimbun; 1914–1924). He is known for being a "rebellious journalist" for his criticism of the Japanese military and totalitarianism in Japan during the late Taishō and early Shōwa periods.

Born in Kanazawa, he attended the Fourth Higher School alongside his friend Shūsei Tokuda. During his younger years, he was an aspiring novelist. Shortly before graduating from Tokyo Imperial University, Faculty of Law, he gave up being a novelist following advice from Roan Uchida. He became the editor-in-chief of Shimotsuke Shimbun in 1902 and worked as a journalist for Osaka Mainichi Shimbun and Osaka Asahi Shimbun.

He is known for his editorials such as the "Rōshū Daha-ron: Nogi Shōgun no Junshi" and "Kantō Bōkū Dai-enshū o Warau". Shortly after he resigned from The Shinano Mainichi Shimbun in 1933, he launched the bi-monthly magazine Tazan no Ishi, where he published anti-military and anti-fascist articles until his death in 1941. The magazine was heavily censored by the military.

== Early life and education ==
Kiryū Yūyū was born on May 20, 1873, in Kanazawa, Ishikawa Prefecture, in the Empire of Japan as Kiryū Masaji. He attended Fourth Higher School, where he was close friends with Shūsei Tokuda, which Tokuda called his "literary partner". Following the death of Shūsei's father, he dropped out of school, and the two moved to Tokyo in 1892. Shortly after arriving in Tokyo, he worked as a private tutor for the younger brother of Kyōka Izumi. Aspiring to be a novelist, they tried to become a disciple of Ozaki Kōyō but failed. They worked part-time making fire extinguisher parts.

A year and a half later, he returned to Kanazawa and resumed his studies. During this time, Kiryū gained experience publishing a serialized creative work in the Hokkoku Shimbun after Ishibashi Ningetsu picked him as a guest writer. He entered the Department of Political Science at the Tokyo Imperial University, Faculty of Law. Before graduating, he decided to give up writing novels on the advice of Roan Uchida. He graduated in 1899.

== Career ==
Kiryū on his desk at The Shinano Mainichi Shimbun

He briefly worked as a civil servant before joining Hakubunkan in 1900. In the summer of 1901, he entered the Tokyo Imperial University's Faculty of Law to study legal philosophy under Professor Hozumi Nobushige. He was invited to become the editor-in-chief for Shimotsuke Shimbun in 1902, after quiting he joined Osaka Mainichi Shimbun, and Osaka Asahi Shimbun. In 1910, he was invited to become the editor-in-chief of The Shinano Mainichi Shimbun. In September 1912, an editorial by Kiryū about the suicide of General Nogi Maresuke entitled "Rōshū Daha-ron: Nogi Shōgun no Junshi" (陋習打破論－乃木将軍の殉死; "An Argument for Breaking with Archaic Customs: General Nogi’s junshi"), in which he condemned the practice of junshi calling it as "thoughtless" and "meaningless", adding that it is a "feudalistic" (封建の遺習) and a "barbaric custom" (野蛮の遺風) and "it should be abolished immediately" (一刻も早く之を打破せねばならぬ). It sparked a controversy and was heavily criticized.

He resigned from The Shinano Mainichi Shimbun in 1914, citing conflicts with the company's management policies. That same year, he became editor-in-chief of Shin Aichi (now the Chunichi Shimbun). During his time, he engaged in debates with Nagoya Shimbun on issues such as the acquisition of Nagoya city trams. He also criticized Terauchi Masatake's cabinet for censorship of rice riots of 1918. He published the editorial "Shinbunshi no Shokuryō Seme Tate yo Zenkoku no Shinbunshi!" (新聞紙の食糧攻め 起てよ全国の新聞紙！; The Press Under Siege by the Food Crisis: Rise Up, Newspapers Across the Nation!), which—according to Chunichi Shimbun—spearheaded a movement to "defend freedom of speech and topple the government" and resulted in the resignation of Masatake. He left the company in 1924 during the Second Constitutional Protection Movement. He tried to launch a daily newspaper but failed. He later returned as the editor-in-chief of The Shinano Mainichi Shimbun in 1928.

=== Conflict with the military ===
An editorial by Kiryū titled "Kantō Bōkū Dai-enshū o Warau" (関東防空大演習を嗤う; Laughing at the Kanto Air Defense Maneuvers), published on August 11, 1933. It criticized the massive anti-air raid drills held by the Imperial Japanese Army Air Service over Tokyo that took place on August 9. The military launched a smear campaign against him and the newspaper. Despite being pressured, the company refused to issue an apology and fire Kiryū. Kiryū later left the newspaper in December 1933.

In 1934, he founded the bi-monthly magazine Tazan no Ishi (他山の石; Stones from Other Mountains) after moving to Moriyama, Aichi Prefecture (now part of Moriyama-ku, Nagoya). He was reported to have lived in poverty during this time. From 1935 to 1938, 25 issues of the magazine were censored or banned. To continue publishing, he decided to submit a manuscript to the Aichi Prefectural Special Higher Police and delete any pointed-out sections. However, he still continued to criticize the government and the military. Records during this time also shows directives from Home Ministry to keep Kiryū under surveillance.

Following the February 26 incident, he wrote in his magazine.

だから、言ったではないか、はやくに軍部の妄動をいさめなければ、その害の及ぶところ実に測り知るべからざるものがあると

[That is precisely why I said—if the reckless actions of the military were not curbed early on, the resulting harm would be truly incalculable.]

— Kiryū Yūyū, Tazan no Ishi (1936)

In response, the military authorities suppressed the publication of the magazine by banning and censoring it. It was forced to shut down on September 5, 1941. The magazine has published 163 issues; 27 are censored and banned.

=== Decline in health and death ===
Around 1940, Kiryū noticed his health deteriorating and learned that he had laryngeal cancer and only a short time left to live. On September 5, 1941, he wrote the last issue of his magazine, which was not published due to his worsening health. In the issue, he added a farewell message in which he lamented the current state of newspapers and journalists at that time who were "content with censorship and cooperating with the war effort".

小生が理想したる戦後の一大軍粛を見ることなくして早くもこの世を去ることは如何にも残念至極に御座候

[It is a matter of profound regret that I shall depart this life all too soon, without ever witnessing the sweeping military reform of the postwar era that I had envisioned.]

— Kiryū Yūyū, Tazan no Ishi (1941)

On September 10, 1941, he died of laryngeal cancer at the age of 68 in Nagoya. His farewell message was heavily censored and was banned from publication. He was buried in Tama Cemetery in Tokyo. A monument was built next to his grave, which is inscribed with his own haiku.

== Personal life ==
Kiryū married Suzu Fujie in late 1902. They had eleven children—six sons and five daughters. He was highly proficient in English.

=== Political views ===
Kiryū was a critic of the Japanese military, totalitarianism, and a prominent anti-war activist. He was described to be a "rebellious journalist" (反骨のジャーナリスト) for his criticism of the military before the war, notably for his 1933 editorial "Kantō Bōkū Dai-enshū o Warau". He was described by the Heibonsha World Encyclopedia as a British-style democrat and a social reformer. James L. Huffman said that "he pioneered a form of resistance in which liberal thinkers expressed themselves freely."

During his tenure as the editor-in-chief of The Shinano Mainichi Shimbun, he ran a vigorous editorial campaign in support of First Constitutional Protection Movement. In 1917, following the Hiyama incident, he campaigned for social purification, calling out the misconduct of a girls' school principal. Following his return to The Shinano Mainichi Shimbun, he was a fierce critic of the Peace Preservation Law, the military build-up of Japan, and the May 15 Incident. In his magazine, Tazan no Ishi, he engaged in an anti-military and anti-fascist campaign. In the July 5, 1936 issue of Tazan no Ishi, he advocated for women's suffrage in Japan.

== See also ==
- Censorship in the Empire of Japan
- Political dissidence in the Empire of Japan
