= Shizue Natsukawa =

Japanese actress (1909–1999)

- 夏川静枝
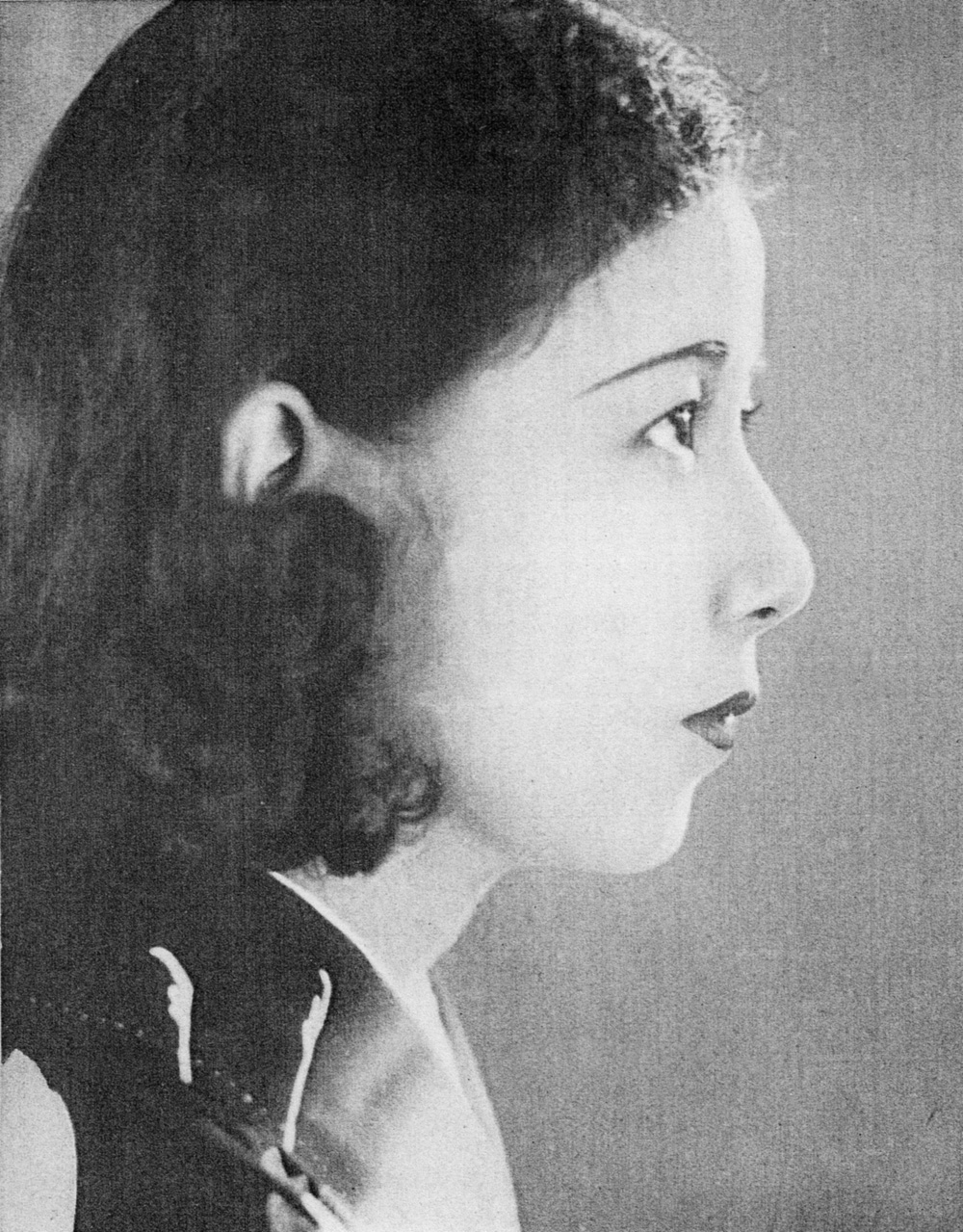
- Shizue Natsukawa in 1932
- Born: Shizue Saitō; 9 March 1909; Shiba, Tokyo, Tokyo, Japan
- Died: 24 January 1999 (aged 89); Tokyo, Japan
- Other name: Shizue Iida
- Occupation: Actress
- Years active: 1916–1999
- Spouse: Nobuo Iida

Shizue Natsukawa (夏川静枝, Natsukawa Shizue; 9 March 1909 – 24 January 1999) was a Japanese stage and film actress who appeared in works of directors Kenji Mizoguchi, Shirō Toyoda and Keisuke Kinoshita.

== Biography ==
Natsukawa was born in Tokyo and first appeared on stage at the age of seven. She gave her film debut in The Glow of Life in 1918 (released 1919), in which she appeared together with her brother Daijirō. In 1927, joined the Nikkatsu studio, where she gained popularity through films such as Tsubakihime and Kekkon nijuso: zenpen. She married composer Nobuo Iida and retired from acting for a while, but returned to the screen with Shirō Toyoda's Spring on Leper's Island. She played many secondary roles in films and on television after the war.

Natsukawa's daughter Kahoru Natsukawa (1943–1998) also acted on stage and in film.

== Selected filmography ==
=== Film ===
- The Glow of Life (1919)
- Tsubakihime (1927)
- Kekkon nijuso: zenpen (1928)
- Tokyo March (1929)
- Young People (1937)
- Spring on Leper's Island (1940)
- Love Letter (1953)
- Be Happy, These Two Lovers (1953)
- Twenty-Four Eyes (1954)
- Night Drum (1957)
- Anzukko (1958)
- Kwaidan (1964)

=== Television ===
- Akō Rōshi (1964)
