= Shingeki =

Form of theatre in Japan based on modern realism

Shingeki (新劇; literally "new drama") was a leading form of theatre in Japan that was based on modern realism. Born in the early years of the 20th century, it sought to be similar to modern Western theatre, putting on the works of the ancient Greek classics, William Shakespeare, Molière, Henrik Ibsen, Anton Chekov, Tennessee Williams, and so forth. As it appropriated Western realism, it also introduced women back onto the Japanese stage.

== History ==
=== Historical background ===
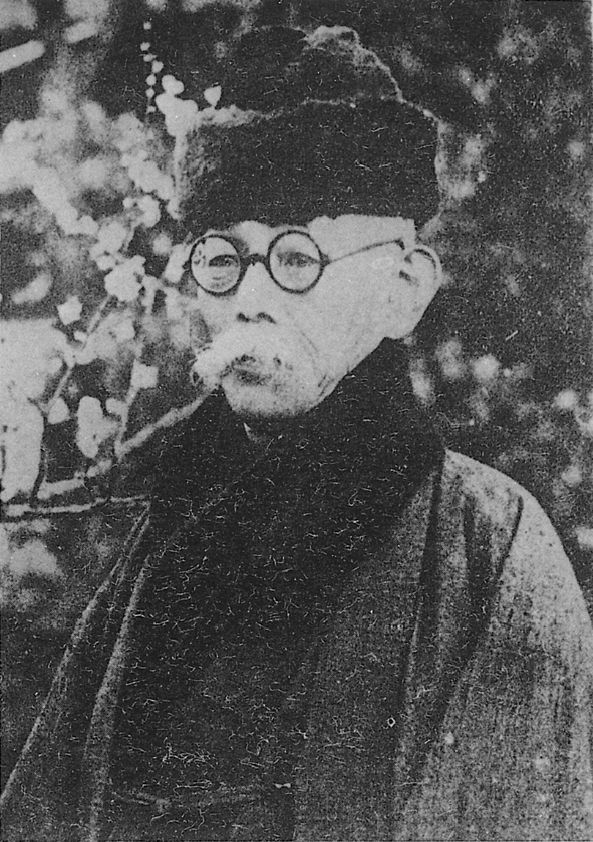
Tsubouchi Shōyō.

The origin of Shingeki is linked to various movements and theatre companies. Scholars associate its origin with the kabuki reform movement, the founding of the Bungei Kyokai (Literary Arts Movement) in 1906, and the Jiyū Gekijō (Free Theatre) in 1909. Also relevant is the establishment of an Ibsen Society in Japan, the Ipusen-kai, by Kunio Yanagita in 1903 to study Ibsen's plays.

The Meiji Restoration in 1868 had led to the introduction of Western drama, singing, and acting onto the Japanese stage, as well as bringing the conventions of realism. In the late 19th century, and early 20th century, there were attempts to "modernize" Japanese theatre. Japanese artists experimented with kabuki theatre, creating shin-kabuki and also created shinpa, which attempted to fuse together modern technology and acting styles to create something new. However, unlike Shingeki, shinpa and shin-kabuki never developed into mainstream modern theatre. Kabuki, shin-kabuki, and shinpa were the only types of theatre that was around before the birth of Shingeki.

Shingeki theater developed in the early 20th century in response to the perceived “irrationality” of these earlier forms of Western-style theater that had been popularized during the late 19th century, as well as to “premodern” or “feudal” forms of traditional Japanese theater such as kabuki and noh. Shingeki companies thus sought to present Western-style theatrical productions in modern, Western-style theaters with less stylized and more “realistic” situations, dialogues, costumes, and set design.

=== Historical figures ===
==== Tsubouchi Shōyō and Osanai Kaoru ====
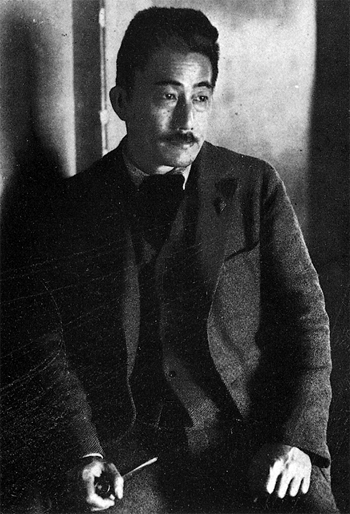
Osanai Kaoru.

Scholars link two historical figures to the development of Shingeki. The first is Tsubouchi Shōyō. Tsubouchi established the Bungei Kyokai, mentioned above, at Waseda University. He wrote and directed many early Shingeki plays, translated the entire works of Shakespeare into Japanese, and taught theater and literature as a Waseda professor. Most recognize him as the founder of theatre research in Japan. According to historians, he explored mediums other than theatre. He wanted to modernize literature in general, however, he focused on the novel and drama. Tsubouchi did not believe kabuki should be replaced, but that it should be reformed. He studied western pieces as a means to reforming Japanese drama and literature. His plays include Kiri no hitotha (A Leaf of Paulownia), and En no gyoja (The Hermit), which were heavily influenced by western style playwrights, and dealt with psychological insight that did not fit into the mold of kabuki theatre. He produced and directed plays that were considered landmarks in the new theatre, however, the Bungei Kyokai was disbanded in 1913 due to drama between the members.

Osanai Kaoru, is a second major figure in the Shingeki movement, played a key role in inspiring other artists and playwrights. He, along with Hijikata Yoshi, founded the Tsukiji Little Theatre in 1924 where he attempted to combine aspects of Western theatre with kabuki. He traveled to the West to study their theatre before coming back to Japan and producing West inspired works. While he did not openly dislike kabuki and traditional Japanese theatre, he had an agitation towards the work they were producing because it was resistant to change. Osanai announced he would not produce any Japanese works for two years, frustrated with the lack of quality as stated before, and that only translations of Western works would be put on the stage. The troupe produced many Western plays, including; Chekov's Uncle Vanya and Cherry Orchard, Ibsen's Ghosts and An Enemy of the People, Shakespeare's Julius Caesar, etc. Scholars considered his production of Ibsen's John Gabriel Borkman, with kabuki reformed actor, Ichikawa Sandanji II, the origin of Shingeki. However, when Osanai died in 1928, the troupe disbanded.

=== Pre-War ===
Between 1928 through 1932, Shingeki began to get more political than before. Various leftist intellectuals attempted to fight their political battle for socialism all while rallying around Shingeki theatre companies. Playwrights such as Kubo Sakae, Murayama Tomoyoski, and Miyoshi Jurō were key figures in Shingeki political theatre. Unlike Osanai, these companies focused on Japanese scripts creating a space for Japanese plays that was not available before. The government did catch wind of the leftist plays and began arresting artists and oppressing leftist companies.

=== Post World War II ===
During the war, almost all Shingeki troupes were disbanded by the authorities, except for Bungakuza. Therefore, after the war the desire to bring Shingeki back was evident. After the war, America occupied Japan, attempting to reconstruct its culture to a more Western based one. The Supreme Commander for the Allied Powers (or SCAP) and Shingeki theatre artists have a long history of interaction during the occupied of Japan that often led to confusion and cultural misunderstandings. The SCAP saw Shingeki as a replacement for kabuki theatre. They also saw Western drama being produced in Japan as a way to promote Western thoughts and ideals. They attempted to promote Shingeki as a medium for propaganda and reforming Japanese theatre to make it more Western. However, they failed to see that Shingeki was more than just a pale imitation of Western theatre.

Shingeki gradually rose to popularity again after the war, but at first it was a struggle. Veteran Shingeki performers banded together in December 1945 and produced Chekhov's The Cherry Orchard for audiences which was well received. But the disbandment of the Shingeki companies during the war had nearly extinguished the movement, which essentially had to start over, almost from scratch.

In the early postwar years, many Shingeki performers reacted to their wartime repression by embracing leftism, and some members even joined the Japan Communist Party (JCP). The JCP helped support the revival of the Shingeki movement in the early postwar by organizing “workers’ theater councils” (kinrōsha engeki kyōgikai, abbreviated rōen). These councils were modeled on the prewar German Volksbühne ("People’s Theater") movement and played a crucial role in helping shingeki survive in lean years in the early postwar period by buying up blocks of tickets and mobilizing members of JCP-linked labor unions to attend Shingeki productions.

Over the course of the 1940s and 1950s, the Shingeki movement gradually recovered its strength. For example, when Gekidan Mingei was founded in the early postwar, it had only twelve members: eleven actors and one director. But by the year 1960, however, it had ballooned into a company of 119 members: fifty-one actors, thirteen directors and assistant directors, sixteen administrative staff, and thirty-nine apprentices. However, well into the 1960s, Shingeki companies remained dependent on the rōen to buy up blocks of tickets and fill seats. This meant that their productions tended to be more conservatively leftist and socialist realist to appeal to the sensibilities of the left-leaning labor unionists in the rōen and their JCP backers.

Eventually, the postwar Shingeki movement grew to have hundreds of independent troupes. Among the best known (and longest lived) are: Bungakuza (Literary Theatre), Haiyūza (Actors' Theatre), Gekidan Mingei (People's Art Theatre), Seinenza (Young People's Theatre), and Shiki (Four Seasons). Important playwrights at this time were Abe Kōbō, Yashiro Seiichi, Yagi Shūichirō, and Akimoto Matsuya.

=== The 1960 Anpo protests and the emergence of Angura ===
In 1960, virtually the entire Shingeki community was mobilized to take part in the Anpo struggle against revision of the U.S.-Japan Security Treaty (known as "Anpo" in Japanese), under the auspices of an umbrella organization called the Shingeki Workers Association (新劇人会議 Shingekijin Kaigi). However, many younger members of the troupes, who tended to sympathize with the student radicals in the Zengakuren student federation, were extremely disappointed that the Shingeki Association enforced strict conformity to the passive and ineffectual protest policies of the Japan Communist Party, even after right-wing counter-protester brutally attacked the Shingeki members during a protest march at the National Diet on June 15, 1960, resulting in 80 members being injured. Although discontent had been building throughout the 1950s, the radicalizing experience of the Anpo Protests helped convince many younger Shingeki members to break away and found their own theater troupes, where they could experiment with much more radical forms of avant-garde theater. This was the genesis of the "Angura" theater movement in Japan, also known as the also known as the "Little Theater" (小劇場, shōgekijō) movement, which rejected the Brechtian modernism and formalist realism of Shingeki to stage anarchic "underground" productions in tents, on street corners, and in small spaces that explored themes of primitivism, sexuality, and embodied physicality.

=== 1960s to present ===
Despite the departure of some younger members to found the Angura movement, Shingeki did not disappear or go into any dramatic decline. In fact, with wages rising due to high economic growth during the period of Japan's "economic miracle" in the 1960s, many Shingeki troupes thrived and became far less dependent on the rōen to drive ticket sales. Today, many of the major Shingeki theater companies continue to exist, although the "shingeki" name itself has been dropped from their self-descriptions.

== Influence on cinema ==
Shingeki was an important influence on cinema, first during the Pure Film Movement of the 1910s, when intellectual reformers attempted to modernize Japanese film. Shingeki directors such as Eizō Tanaka produced some of the first reformist films at Nikkatsu like Ikeru shikabane (1917) and shingeki actors like Minoru Murata and Iyokichi Kondō collaborated with Norimasa Kaeriyama to make groundbreaking works like The Glow of Live (Sei no kagayaki, 1918). Kaoru Osanai himself was placed in charge of Shochiku's training school and produced Souls on the Road in 1921, a work that has been called "the first landmark film in Japanese history". In later decades, shingeki provided the cinema both a training ground for new actors, as well as a supply of skilled performers trained in realistic acting.
