= Norimasa Kaeriyama =

Japanese film director

Norimasa Kaeriyama (帰山教正, Kaeriyama Norimasa) (1 March 1893 – 6 November 1964) was a pioneering Japanese film director and film theorist.

== Biography ==
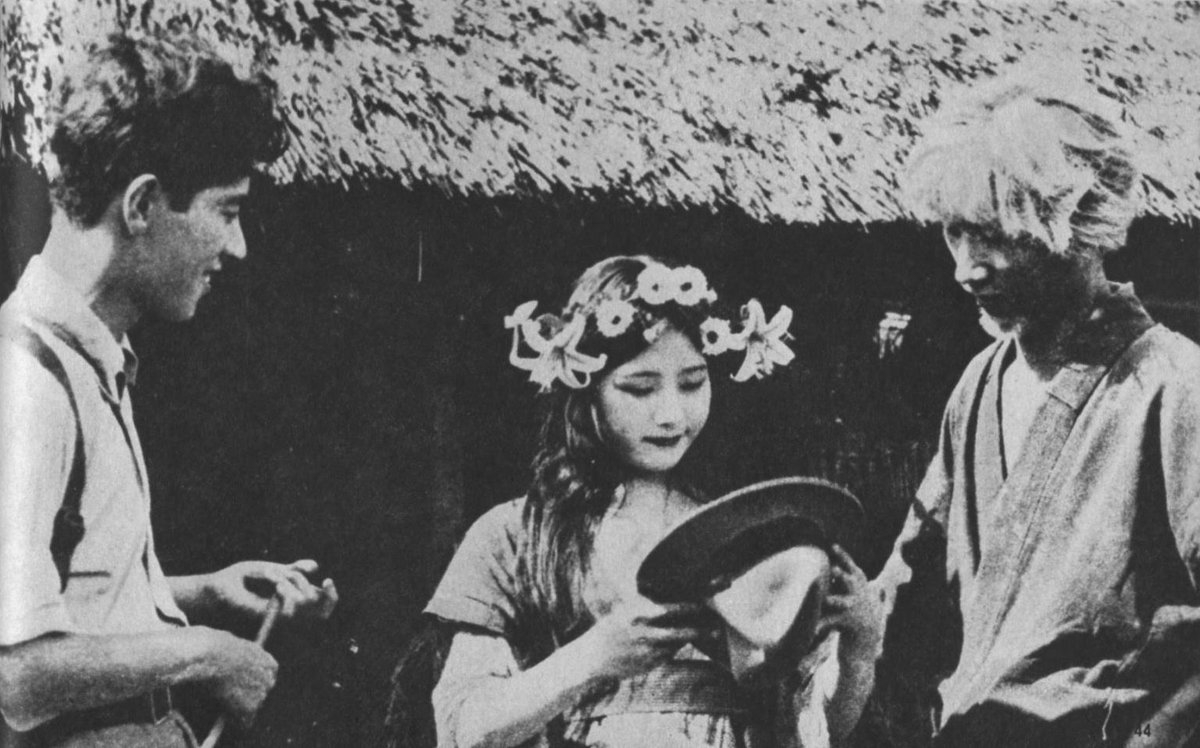
Maid of the Deep Mountains (1919)

Beginning with articles he submitted to Yoshizawa Shōten's magazine Katsudō shashinkai while still a student, Kaeriyama developed a long series of critiques of contemporary Japanese cinema that would make him the leading spokesman of the Pure Film Movement in the 1910s. The ideas about what cinema should be that he developed in the journal Kinema Record, which he helped found with Yukiyoshi Shigeno, were accumulated in his 1917 book, The Production and Photography of Moving Picture Drama (Katsudō shashingeki no sōsaku to satsueihō), an influential work that continued to be reprinted into the 1920s. Although an engineer by training, Kaeriyama entered the film industry, first at Nihon Kinetophone in 1914, and then at Tennenshoku Katsudō Shashin (Tenkatsu) in 1917. It was at the latter that he was able to put his ideals into practice with films such as The Glow of Life (Sei no kagayaki) and Maid of the Deep Mountains (Miyama no otome), which were filmed in 1918 with his production group, the Geijutsu Eiga Kyōkai, but released in 1919. These were hailed as some of the first "pure films" in Japan, in part because Kaeriyama was one of the first to use actresses in a Japanese produced film. Several figures who later made significant contributions to Japanese cinema worked with him on these projects, including Minoru Murata (later a director), Shizue Natsukawa, Iyokichi Kondō, and Sugisaku Aoyama (the latter all actors). Kaeriyama continued directing films until the mid-1920s, but rarely to much success. Afterwards, he returned to engineering work, while continuing to write how-to books on filmmaking as well as pursuing the study of sex in cinema.

== Bibliography ==
- Bernardi, Joanne (2001). Writing in Light: The Silent Scenario and the Japanese Pure Film Movement. Wayne State University Press. ISBN 0-8143-2926-8.
