= Pure Film Movement =

Trend in film criticism and filmmaking in 1910s and early 1920s Japan

The Pure Film Movement (純映画劇運動, Jun'eigageki undō) was a trend in film criticism and filmmaking from 1917 to 1923 in Japan that advocated what were considered more modern and cinematic modes of filmmaking.

As the background of the movement, the foreign movie which raised the level under the first World War was imported, and the social situation such as Taisho Democracy was mentioned, and the voice to criticize the old style Japanese movie was raised by these influences.

== Background ==
Critics in such magazines as Kinema Record and Kinema Junpo complained that existing Japanese cinema was overly theatrical. They said it presented scenes from kabuki and shinpa theater as is, with little cinematic manipulation and without a screenplay written with cinema in mind. Women were even played by onnagata. Filmmakers were charged with shooting films with long takes and leaving the storytelling to the benshi in the theater instead of using devices such as close-ups and analytical editing to visually narrate a scene. The novelist Jun'ichiro Tanizaki was an important supporter of the movement. Critics such as Norimasa Kaeriyama eventually became filmmakers to put their ideas of what cinema is into practice, with Kaeriyama directing The Glow of Life at the Tenkatsu Studio in 1918. This is often considered the first "pure film," but filmmakers such as Eizō Tanaka, influenced by shingeki theater, also made their own innovations in the late 1910s at studios like Nikkatsu.

== See also ==
- Cinema of Japan
- Japanese New Wave
- Anime

== Bibliography ==
- Bernardi, Joanne (2001). Writing in Light: The Silent Scenario and the Japanese Pure Film Movement. Wayne State University Press. ISBN 0-8143-2926-8.
- Gerow, Aaron (2010). Visions of Japanese Modernity: Articulations of Cinema, Nation, and Spectatorship, 1895–1925. University of California Press. ISBN 978-0-520-25456-5.
- Lamarre, Thomas (2005). Shadows on the Screen: Tanizaki Junʾichirō on Cinema and "Oriental" Aesthetics. Center for Japanese Studies, University of Michigan. ISBN 1-929280-32-7.
- Richie, Donald (1971). Japanese Cinema: Film Style and National Character. Doubleday. Available online at the Center for Japanese Studies, University of Michigan
