= Tennenshoku Katsudō Shashin =

Japanese film studio active in the 1910s

Tennenshoku Katsudō Shashin (天然色活動写真) was a Japanese film studio active in the 1910s. The name translates as the "Natural Color Moving Picture Company," but it was known as Tenkatsu for short. The company was formed in 1914 by remnants of the Fukuhōdō studio that did not take part in the merger that formed Nikkatsu, particularly the entrepreneur Kisaburō Kobayashi, and was first aimed at exploiting the Kinemacolor color motion picture system in Japan. That system became too expensive, so the company soon settled on making regular films, becoming Nikkatsu's main rival in the 1910s. Although it was a decentralized company, one that was run by various bosses and allowed benshi to order the production of films,

Tenkatsu played a part in the Pure Film Movement by allowing its employee Norimasa Kaeriyama to direct some of the first reformist works incorporating actresses and foreign film technique. It was also known for hiring Ōten Shimokawa to produce some of the first Japanese anime or animated films in Japan in 1916. Shimokowa experimented with several techniques until the studio distributed his first short animated movie of 5 minutes duration in January 1917, called The Story of the Concierge Mukuzō Imukawa (Imokawa Mukuzō, genkanban no maki).

Tenkatsu was eventually bought up by Kokkatsu in December 1919.
