= Ay-O =

Japanese artist (born 1931)

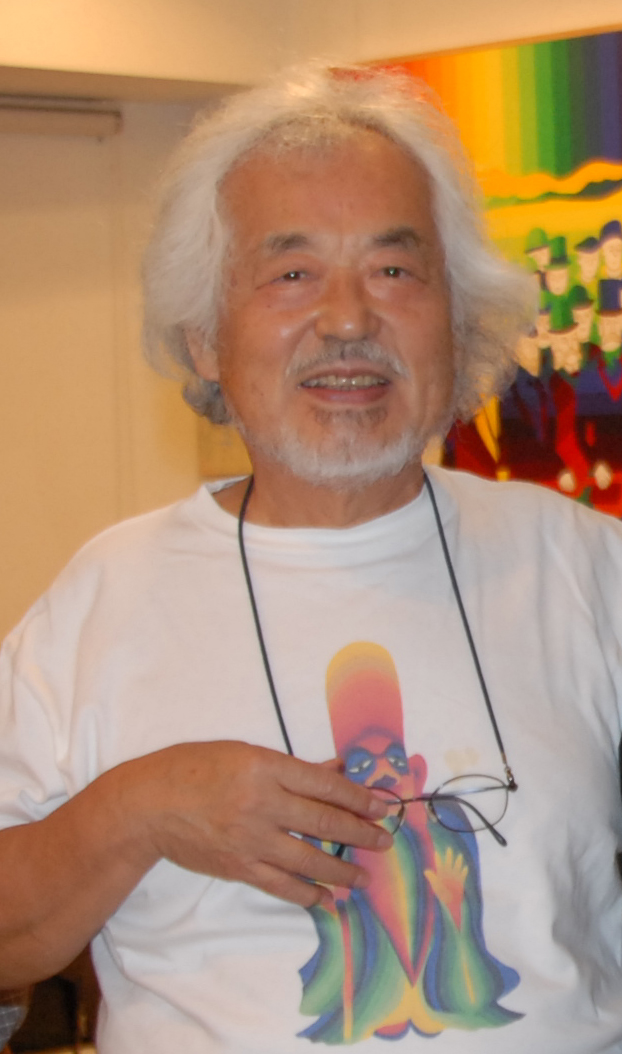
- Ay-O at Gallery Itsutsuji in 2007
- Born: Takao Iijima; 19 May 1931 (age 95); Tamatsukuri village, Namegata district, Ibaraki prefecture, Japan
- Known for: conceptual art performance art
- Notable work: Rainbow Boxes (1964– )
- Movement: Fluxus

Takao Iijima (born 19 May 1931), better known by his art name Ay-O (靉嘔 Ai Ō), is a Japanese avant-garde visual and performance artist who has been associated with Fluxus since its international beginnings in the 1960s.

== Biography ==
=== Early life and education ===
Ay-O was born Iijima Takao in Ibaraki prefecture in 1931. He studied art at Tokyo University of Education.

=== From Demokrato to Fluxus ===
Ay-O started his career in the Demokrato Artists Association (デモクラート美術家協会), along with artists Ei-Q and On Kawara and the photographer Eikoh Hosoe (Demokrato is Esperanto for "democratic). This association promoted artistic freedom and independence in the creation of art. The influence of these values on Ay-O can be seen in a series of early paintings, over which he painted a large X because he thought they were not original enough. Another independent movement in Japan was close to Demokrato: Sōzō Biiku (創造美育) by the collector Sadajirō Kubo (久保貞次郞), which promoted nurturing freedom in art education. Both movements started in Fukui Prefecture in Japan and explain the special bond Ay-O developed with the place. Sōzō Biiku's approach challenges the traditional Japanese Master-Student relationship. Like naive art, the movement promoted approaches independent of established conventions. Kubo also founded the "Small Collector Society" (小コレクターの会) to promote art collecting in society.

In 1955, Ay-O founded a group called Jitsuzonsha ("The Existentialists") along with printmaker and writer Masuo Ikeda, artist Hiroshi Manabe, and others. The group staged three exhibitions before dissolving. Some of Ay-O's works from this period show an influence from Fernand Léger with massive bodies on the canvas, such as the 1.83 by 3.7 metres (6 ft 0 in × 12 ft 2 in) Pastoral (Den'en) from 1956. Working closely with Ikeda piqued Ay-O's interest in printmaking, which he pursued throughout his career. This period also inspired Ay-O to adopt his art name, drawn partly from the title of Sartre's novel (see below).

In 1958, Ay-O relocated to New York City. In 1961, Yoko Ono introduced him to George Maciunas of Fluxus, and Ay-O formally joined Fluxus in 1963. As a member of Fluxus, Ay-O was known for his Finger Boxes series and his performance events. He worked closely with fellow Fluxus artists Maciunas, Emmett Williams, Dick Higgins, and Nam June Paik. Ay-O and Nam June Paik were roommates and became friends in the Soho Fluxus coop.

=== The Rainbow Artist ===
Ay-O established a reputation in the avant-gardes of Japan, Europe, and the United States. In Japan, he is known as the "Rainbow Man" for his use of colorful, rainbow-striped motifs in his artwork. In their purest form, his rainbow paintings are simple gradations, with up to 192 gradations.

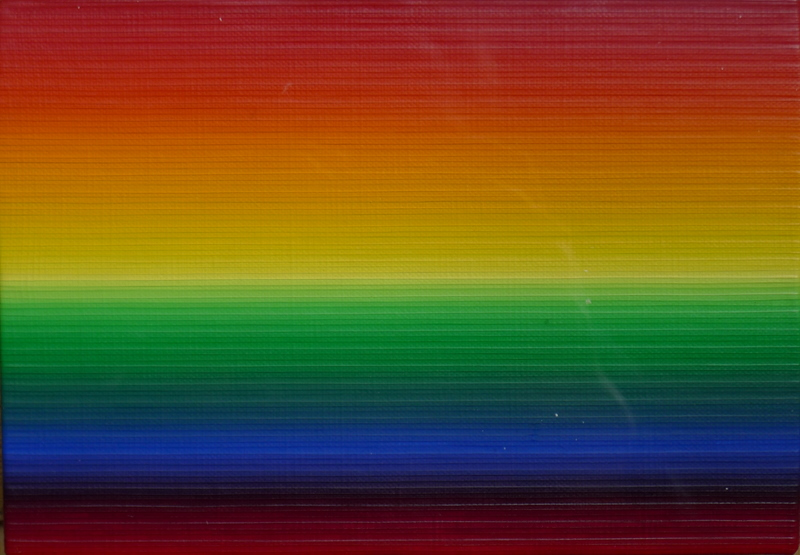
Example with 96 gradations

Ay-O represented Japan at the Venice Biennale in 1966 and at the São Paulo Biennale in 1971. He also built the famed "Tactile Rainbow Room" at the Osaka World's Fair in 1970. In 1971, true to his Demokrato roots, he adapted 10 American Naïve paintings and created a rainbow version that he called Nashville Skyline. Ay-O's attachment to Douanier Rousseau's work is another proof of his interest in naïve art. In 1987 he did a series of Rainbow Happenings, with Rainbow Happening #17 being a 300m Rainbow Eiffel Tower project in Paris. As a rainbow artist, Ay-O embraced abstraction more decisively than before; when human forms appear in his rainbow works, they too become abstract. One notable work from this period, 8:15 A.M. (1988), created for Hiroshima's MOCA, depicts the atomic explosion in his rainbow palette.

=== Recent activities ===
One of his projects in the West was a Collective Portrait of George Maciuanas, which he co-edited with Emmett Williams and Ann Noel. In recent decades, Ay-O has exhibited regularly at the Emily Harvey Gallery in 1996, 2001, and Gallery Itsutsuji in 1996, 2005, 2007, 2012) and Gallery Goto in 1999, 2004 in Japan. In Japan, Ay-O is part of the collection of the National Museum of Modern Art, Tokyo and Kyoto (see 2005 Tokyo exhibition in the links). In 2001, Ay-O had a room in the special exhibit "La Fluxus Constellation" in the Museum of Contemporary Art in Genoa. He was also represented in various other Fluxus exhibitions around the world, such as "Centraal Fluxus Festival" Centraal Museum, Utrecht (2003), and "Fluxus & Non Fluxus Fluxus" Randers kunstmuseum (2006). Having represented Japan at both the Venice Biennale (1966) and São Paulo Biennale (1971), Ay-O was included in "Twelve Japanese Artists from the Venice Biennale 1952-2001" at Art Tower Mito (ATM), Mito. At the Mori Art Museum, Tokyo, Ay-O was part of two exhibitions: "Tokyo-Berlin / Berlin-Tokyo" in 2005 and "All about laughter" in 2007. The MoMA also has several posts about Ay-O: One about his return to Tokyo in 1966 after 8 years in NY, a few about Japanese contributions to the Fluxus movement, or more generally Fluxus where Ay-O is present. Finally, in 2012, the Museum of Contemporary Art Tokyo (MOT) showed a large retrospective exhibition: "Over the Rainbow once more. This was followed by the retrospective being shown at the Hiroshima City Museum of Contemporary Art through to 14.1.2013. The 300m Rainbow from Happening #17 was part of the show. Hiroshima's MOCA exhibit was the occasion of one more happening performed by Ay-O and his team, a Fluxus revival performance, a succession of 30 shorts representing each a different Fluxus artist. This was Ay-O's way to celebrate the 50th birthday of Fluxus, and a Japanese echo of the Wiesbaden events. In 2012, MOMA produced an exhibit titled: "Tokyo 1955-1970 Avant Garde", where Ay-O's work in that period are presented.

=== Fukui (2006) and Japan (2012) Retrospective ===
Ay-O held his most complete retrospective exhibitions in Japan, first at the Fukui Art Museum in 2006. This exhibition was the occasion for the artist's bilingual book, Over the Rainbow, Ay-O Retrospective 1950–2006, which provides an overview of his work. In 2012, a similar retrospective, augmented by recent works, "Ay-O: Over the Rainbow Once More" was shown in various locations in Japan. (Note: e.g., the inaugural exhibit was in the Tokyo MOT) The catalog of the 2012 exhibits clarifies a few points of the reference book from the 2006 exhibit.

=== M+ Exhibition in Hong Kong ===
From December 2023 to May 2024, M+ in Hong Kong hosted a monographic exhibition of Ay-O, featuring oil paintings, sculptures, and prints spanning from the 1950s to the 2000s. Titled "Ay-O: Hong Hong Hong," the exhibition also included a selection of Fluxus works by Ay-O and his contemporaries.

== Finger boxes ==
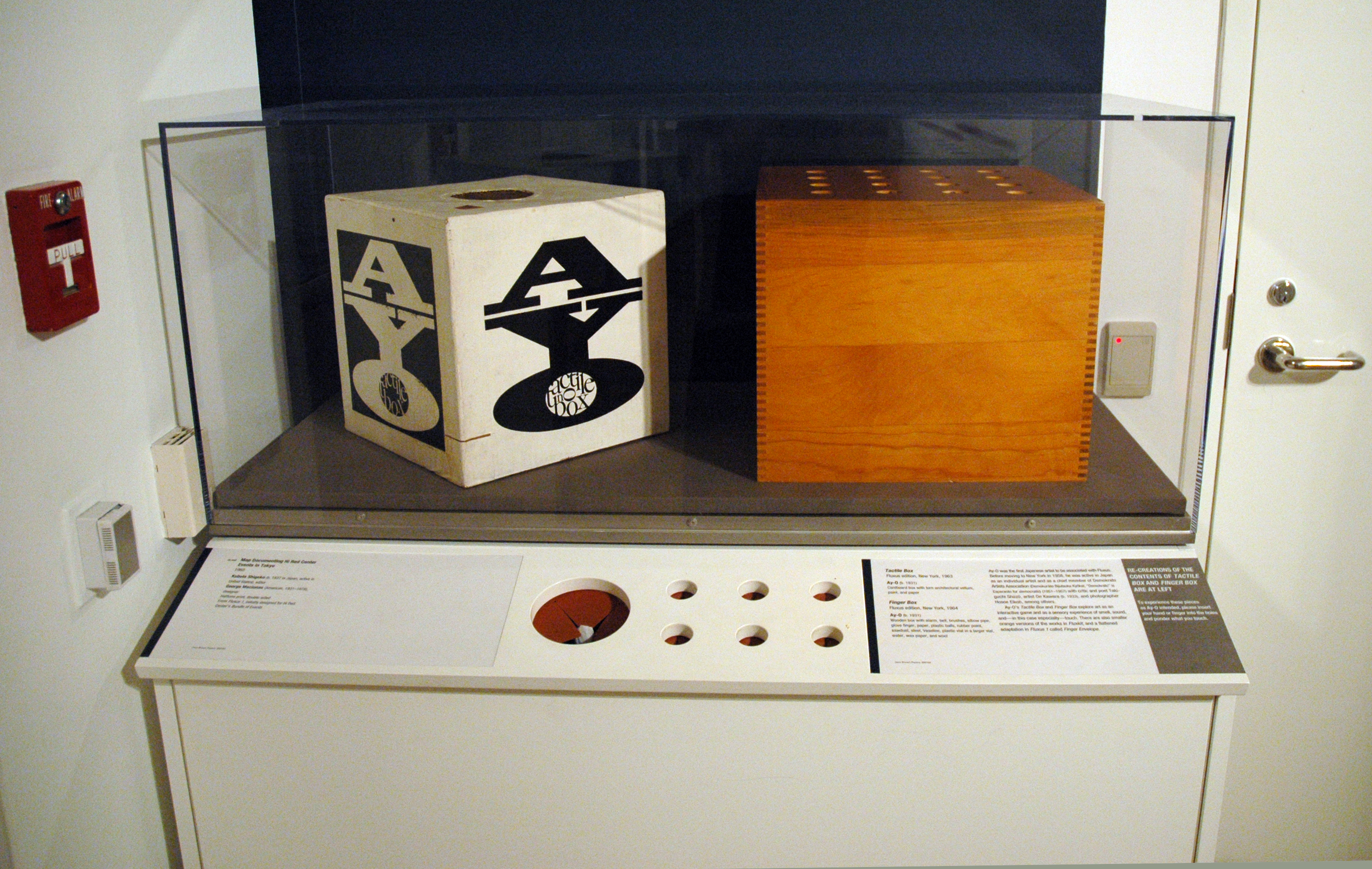
Ay-O's Tactile Box and Finger Box on display in the exhibition Art, Anti-Art, Non-Art: Experimentations in the Public Sphere in Postwar Japan, 1950–1970 at the Getty Center in Los Angeles. In front of the case is a simulator of the artworks within, where visitors can insert their hands (for the Tactile Box) or fingers (for the Finger Box).

The Finger Boxes are works of art by Ay-O that are the most tactile works of art in the Fluxus project. Ay-O first produced them in 1964. There are rumors that they were invented before WWII, although this is unconfirmed. It is said that all of the original Finger Boxes were destroyed during the fighting. Ay-O is said to have learned of this and claimed the invention for himself. The artworks comprise largely identical hollow cubical wooden boxes with finger-sized holes in one face. As tactile works of art, they must be touched to be perceived, by placing one's finger into the hole to feel the material hidden within the box. The contents of the boxes include such things as beads, bristle brushes, hair, cotton balls, nails, and sponges.

The artist's intent, by including items such as nails, which can prick the finger, in the box's possible contents, is to ensure that the user touches the box with an "enquiring, learning gesture". The finger boxes are also intended to be touched by multiple people at a time, promoting a shared, social experience of perceiving the work.

Several versions of the Finger Box exist, including one set of boxes in a briefcase (entitled Finger Box (valise edition)) which is in the Gilbert and Lila Silverman Fluxus Collection in Detroit, and a version (included in Fluxus I) that uses sealed envelopes that have been slit open instead of boxes.

The 2012 Japan retrospective, "Over the Rainbow Once More" is a larger work presented around the finger boxes. The viewer/toucher enters a cubic room whose walls are covered with square rainbow motifs, with concentric squares painted in the rainbow colors around a hole in the wall. Behind each hole, a finger box has been appended on the other side.

== Prints ==
True to his Japanese beginning and the Demokrato movement, Ay-O took some special care to produce a print version of his work. Some of his works exist both as oil on Canvas and print (96 gradations, for example). Ay-O personally gets involved in the process. (Note: Examples can be seen here.) Prints are a way to paint rainbows as one. In a way similar to the execution of Nashville Skyline (where the color was applied by others), Ay-O uses number coding to communicate with his printers: 12 is lemon yellow, 1 is red, 24 is purple. The rainbow is then the consecutive integers. In prints inspired from the shunga tradition, as for example Ten komanda no zu, kōbutsu 十開の圖 虹佛 (Depiction of the Ten Commandments, Rainbow Buddha) Rainbow Hokusai, 1970, from the British Museum Collection, the printing technique assembles 54 separate square cards, each printed with part of the design.

== Happenings ==
Happenings are a tradition from the Fluxus movement. Many Fluxus members organise or participate in such happenings. Notable examples include Piano Activities and Yoko Ono's Cut Piece. Ay-O has participated in and organised such happenings since the 1960s and continues to do so to this day. The early events were worldwide. In New-York (1965) in Flux Hall "Memoriam of Adriano Olivetti," "Rainbow Staircase Environment, 363 Canal Street, New York, November 20", "Rainbow Music #1," Tokyo (1966) "Happening for a sightseeing bus trip in Tokyo" with its movie on the Museum of Modern Art website, Fukui (1986) Rainbow Happening #16, a 25-meter rainbow in the Eiheiji Temple, Paris (1987) Rainbow Happening #17. A happening was part of his 2012 retrospective and the Rainbow Dinner that year. Organised by Ay-O, the rainbow prominently figures in such happenings. In both the 2006 and the 2012 retrospectives, some theme mixing traditional fluxus themes (like 'One for Violin' executed in 2006 by Nam June Paik) - a portable and explosive version of Piano Activities and Ay-o specific themes are present.

Happenings
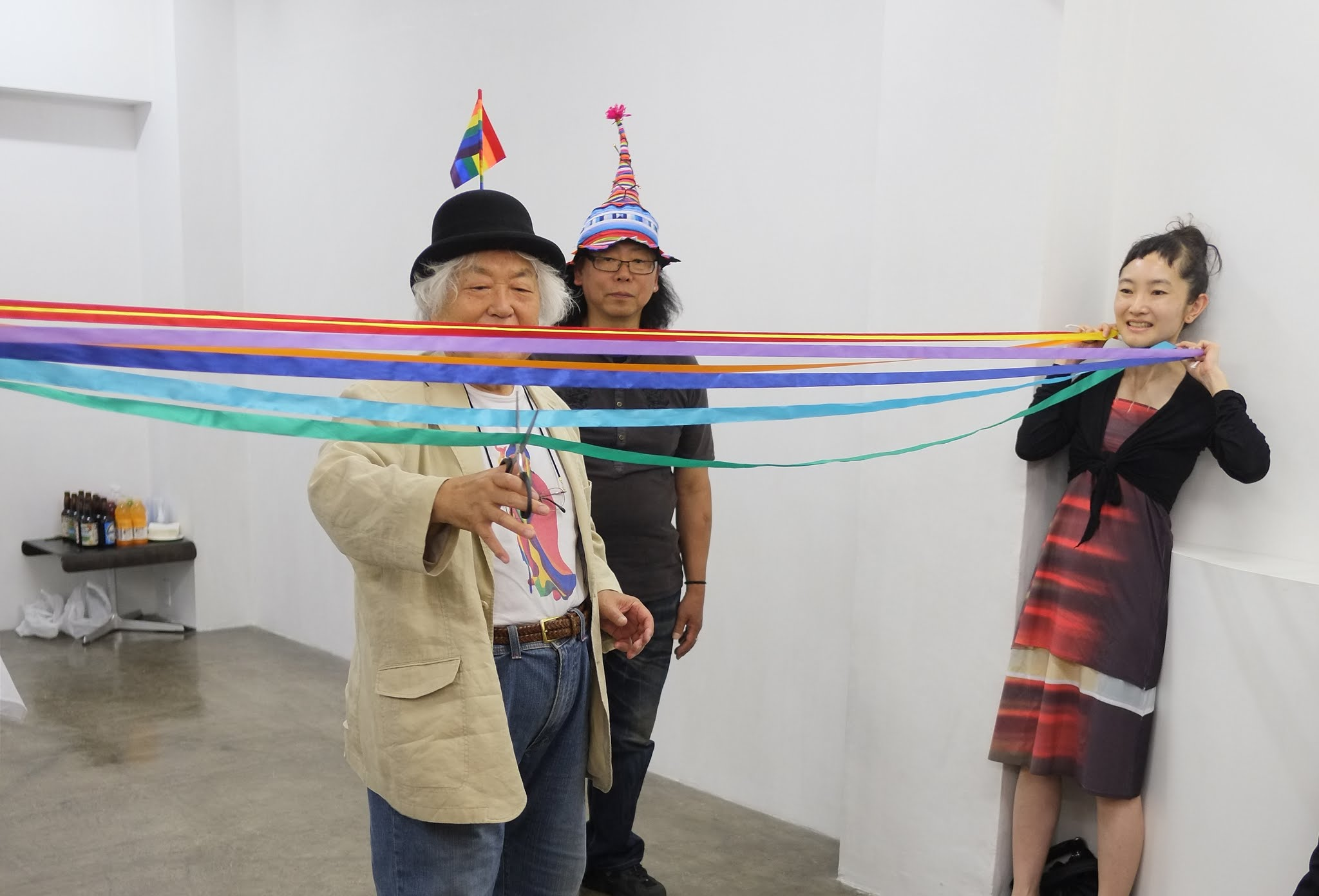
Rainbow Happening 81st birthday

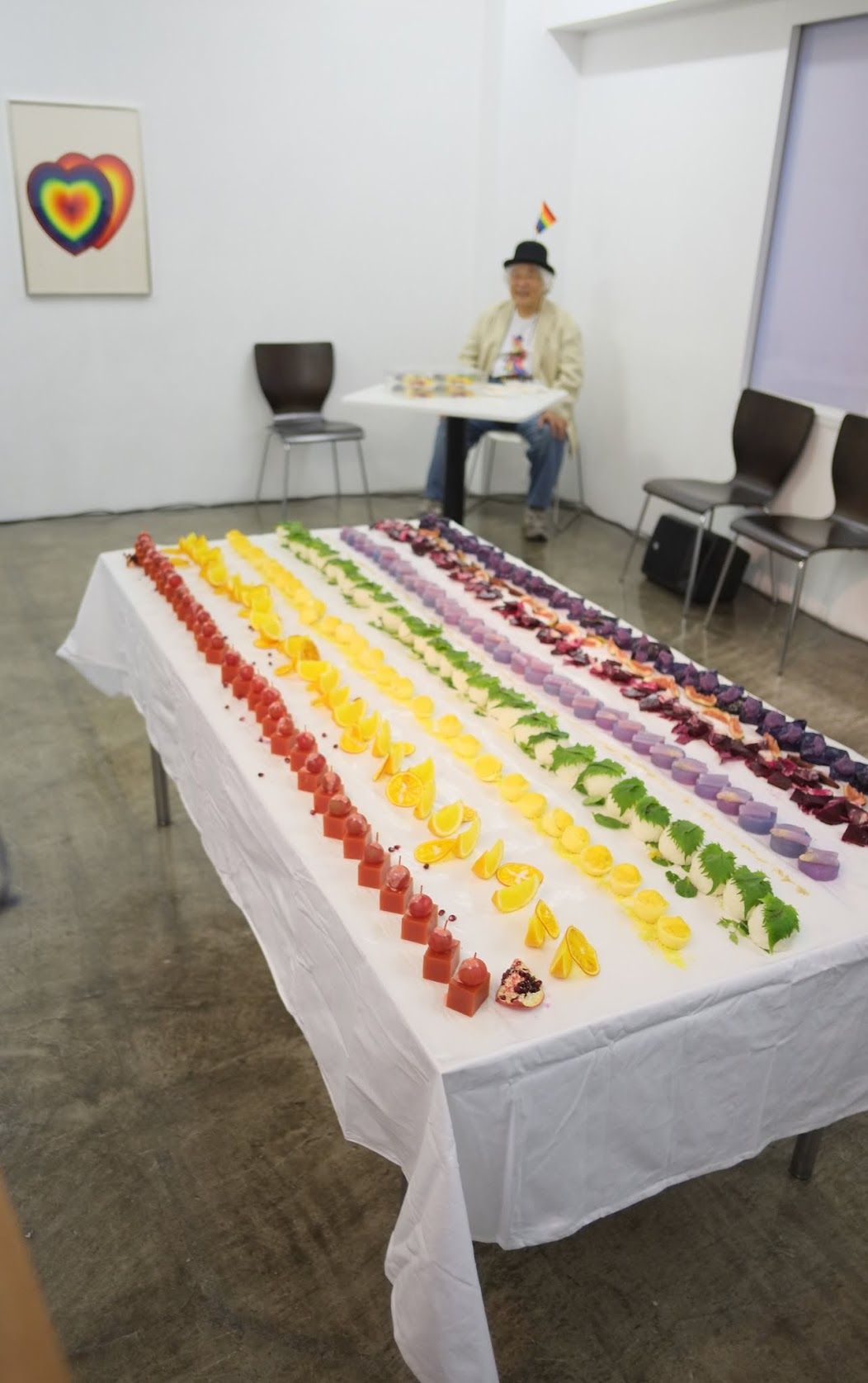
Rainbow Happening 81st birthday

== Kappa and Aztec Faces, kind monsters ==
As can be seen on some of his T-shirts, Ay-O identifies with a mythological creature from Japanese Folklore. The name of the creature is Kappa. This figure appears throughout his art, almost as a self-portrait, recognizable by the water atop the creature's skull.

Another figure used by Ay-O is the Aztec face, as in the 1965 Fluxorchestra concert at Carnegie Recital Hall, used by Hall Maciunas. This face with the tongue extended became almost a logo for the Fluxus movement. Sometimes the Kappa persona appears in works like in these 'fluxus masks' where Ay-o by the simple application of his rainbow palette assimilates a traditional Aztec face into contemporary art. These Aztec faces, despite his fierce independence (or perhaps because of it), mark Ay-O's allegiance to the wider Fluxus movement.

Kind Monsters
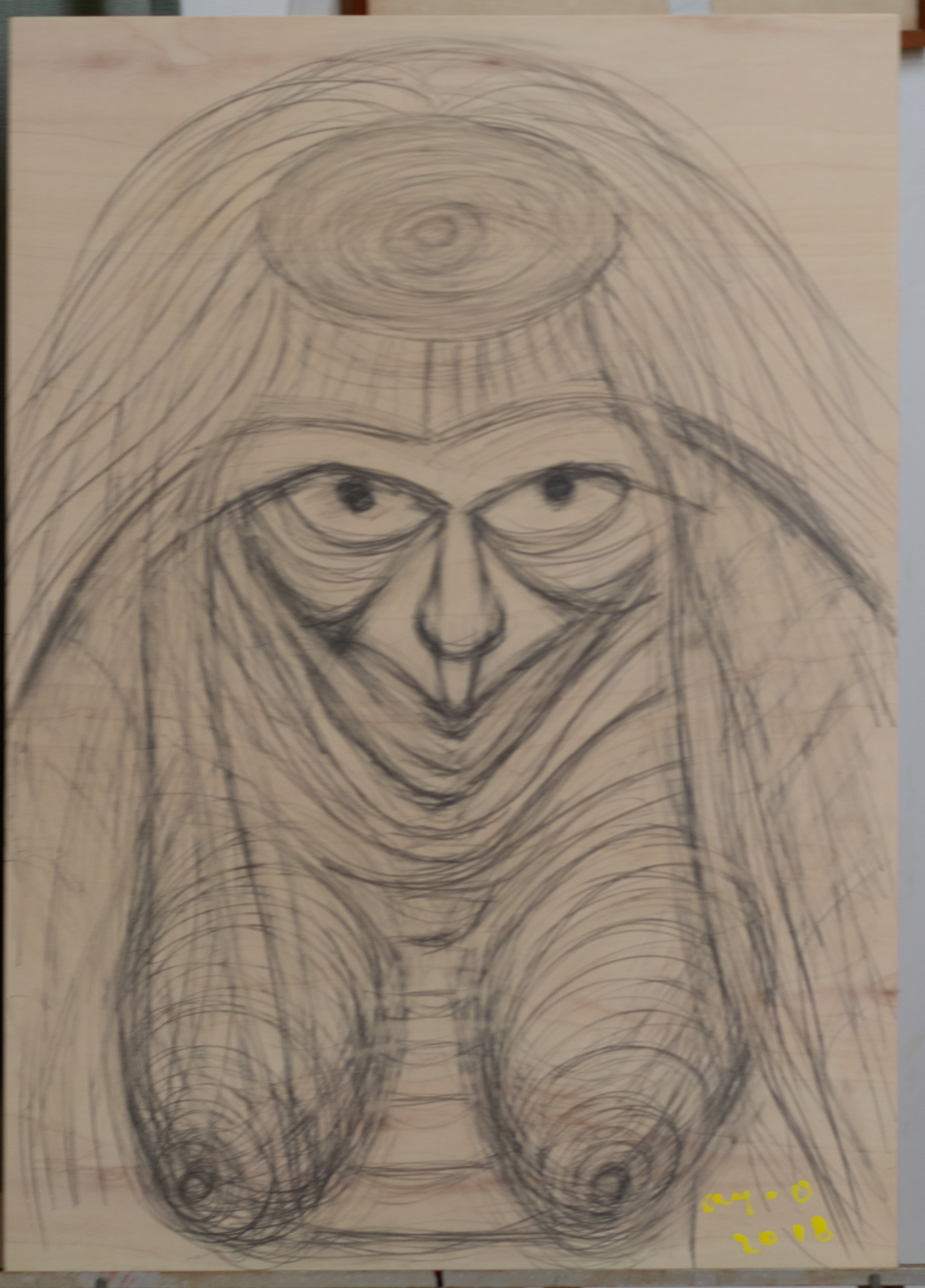
Ay-O as Kappa

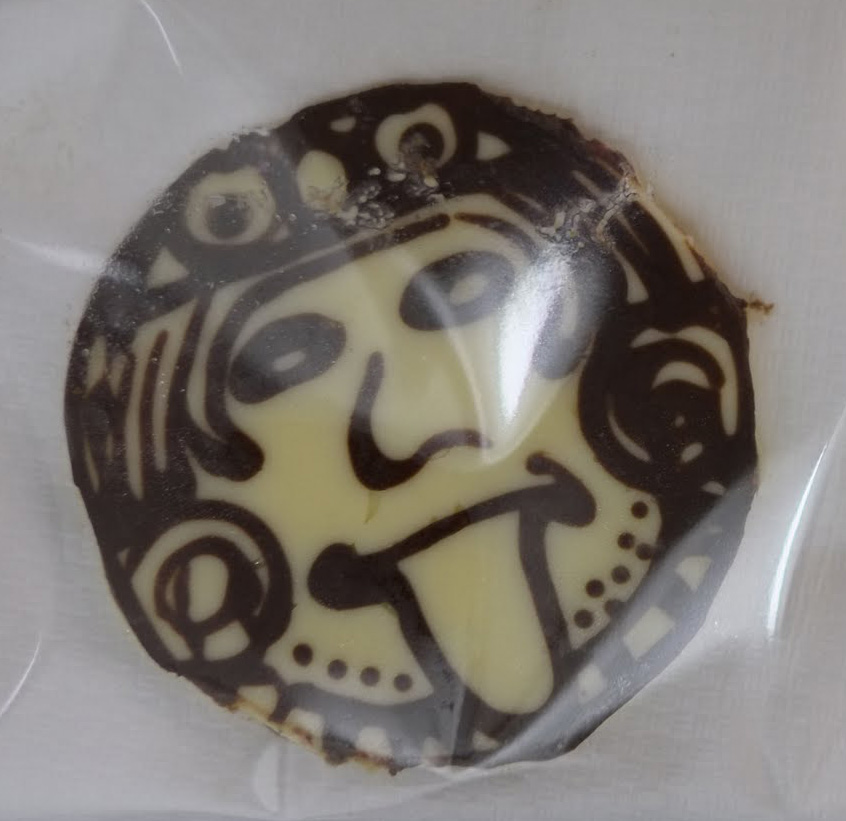
Fluxus Aztec Face (81st birthday cake detail)

== Signatures ==
Ay-O has several phases with different signatures. In older works from the 1950s, the signature is mostly written in plain letters, with the date, as in the 1955 signature.

At the same time, during the pre-rainbow period, some paintings were frequently executed on wood, and the signature was sometimes etched into the wood.

In this 1954 example, it is etched as 'O ai'.

With the arrival of the rainbow period in the 1980s, a new signature was introduced, in which the O encircles the other letter in a cartouche-like manner, as seen in this example from 1985 on one of the large 96 gradations works.

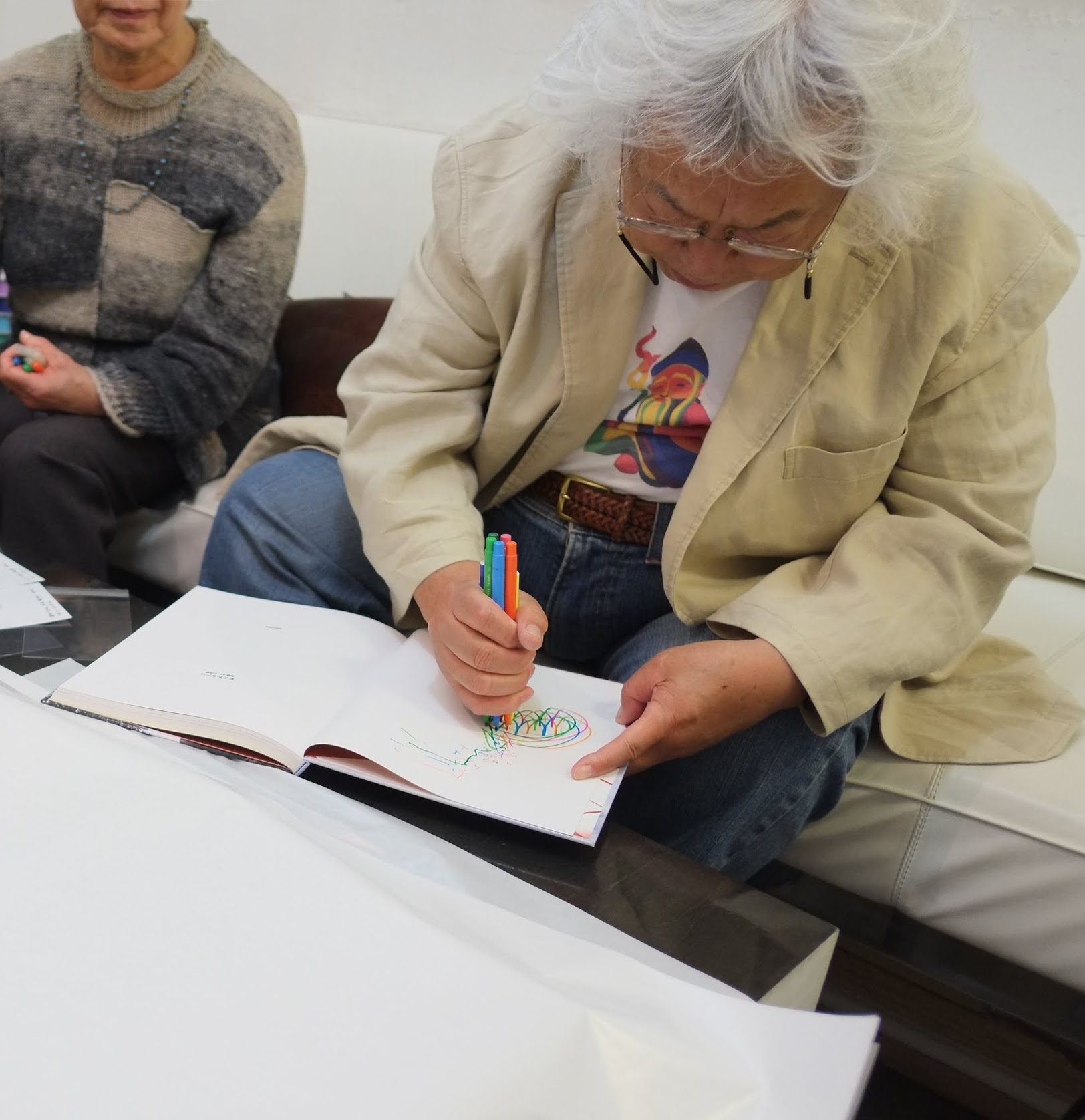
Execution of the rainbow signature

Finally, the rainbow artist developed his 'signature signature': the rainbow signature used mostly for autographs and paper. This is one of his mini happenings. To produce it, AY-O puts felt-tip pens in his fist, with all the colors of the rainbow, and signs with them, as shown in this picture of a book signed with the rainbow signature.

On paper Ay-O signs using roman letters and his kanji (靉嘔). As for the origin of the name from Ay-O's own and most recent retrospective catalog "Over the rainbow once more" (2012), page 75: "Ay-O, an unusual pseudonym for a Japanese, was conceived during Ay-O's third year at Tokyo Kyoiku University, when he had his friends choose then favorite sounds from the Japanese syllabary A, I, U, E and O. The result: 'AIO.' To express this name, he selected the kanji character 'ai,' from aitai (靉靆) meaning a scene of drifting clouds, and the kanji character 'ou' (long 'o') from the title of Jean-Paul Sartre's novel. 'Outo' (嘔吐) for ('Nausea')."

Signatures of Ay-O
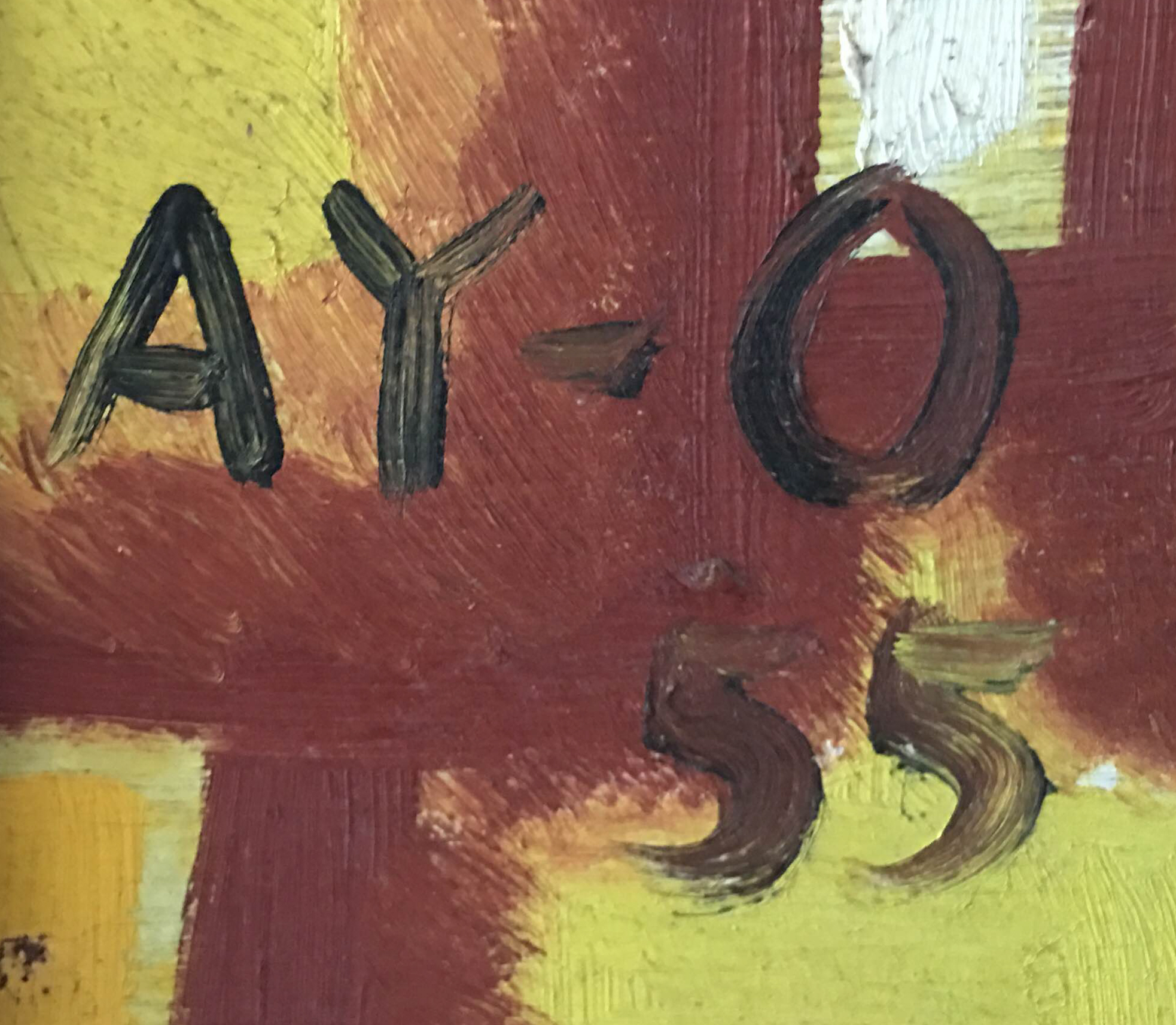
Signature of Ay-O on wood (1955)

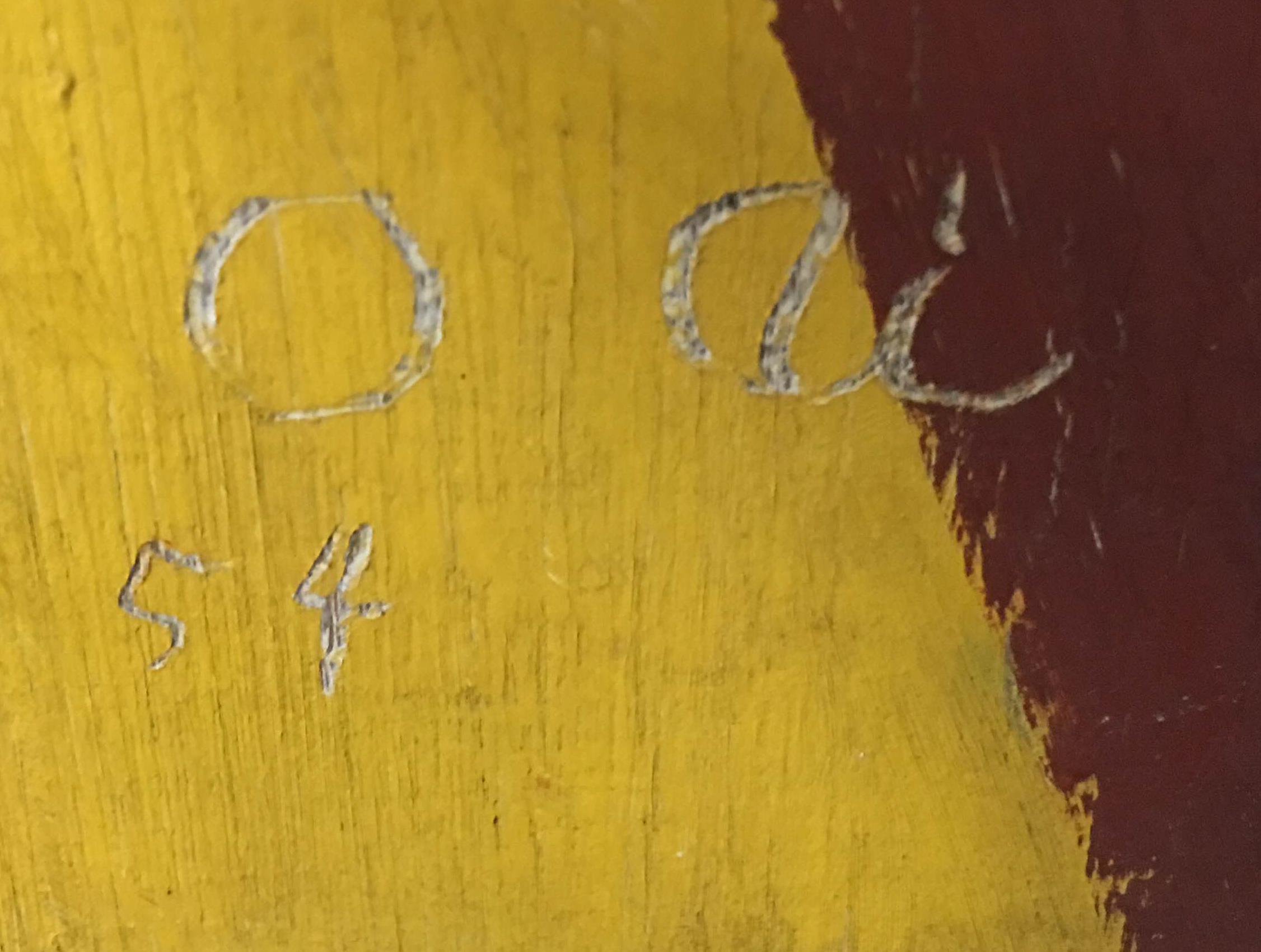
Etched signature 'O ai' (1954)

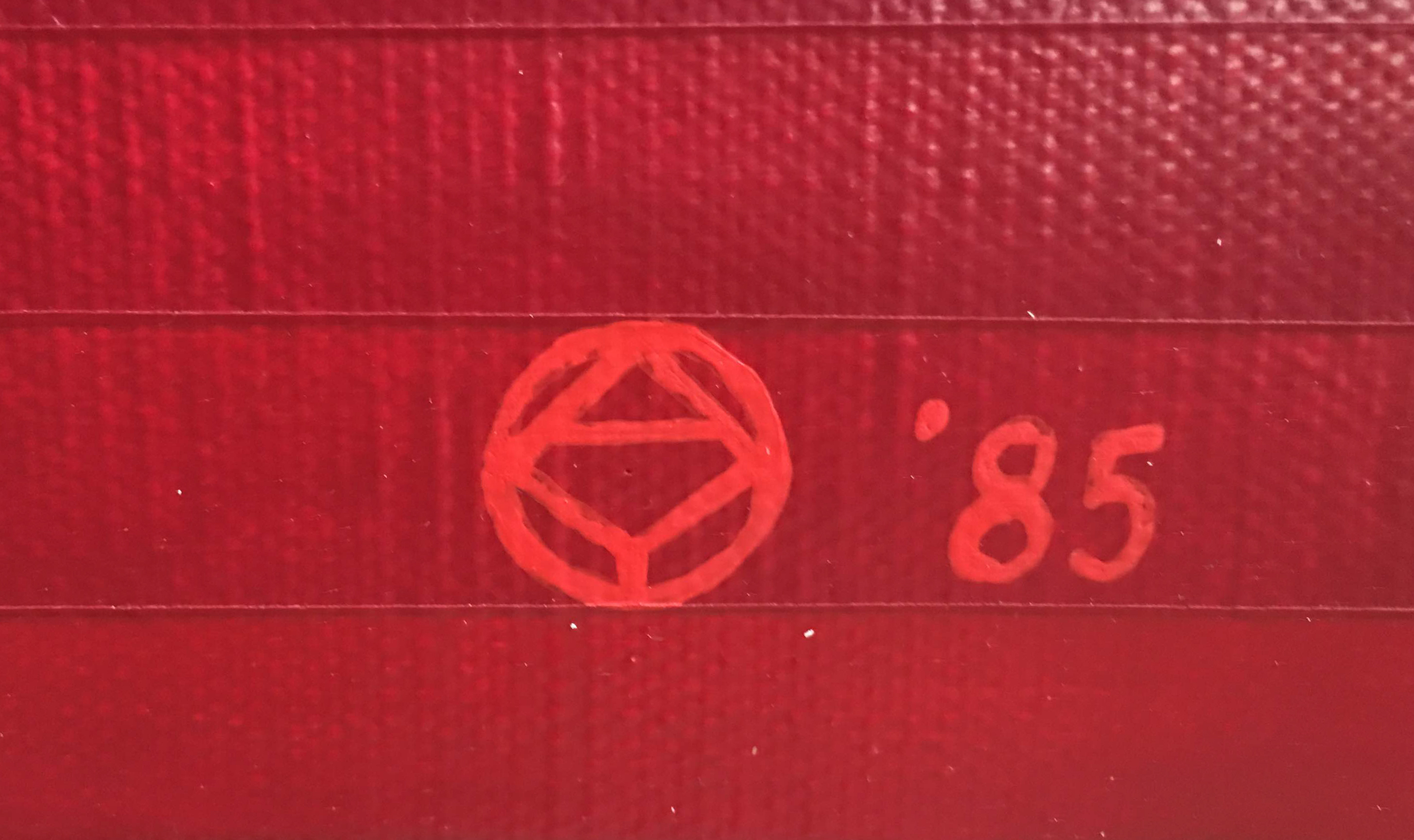
Cartouche from 80s

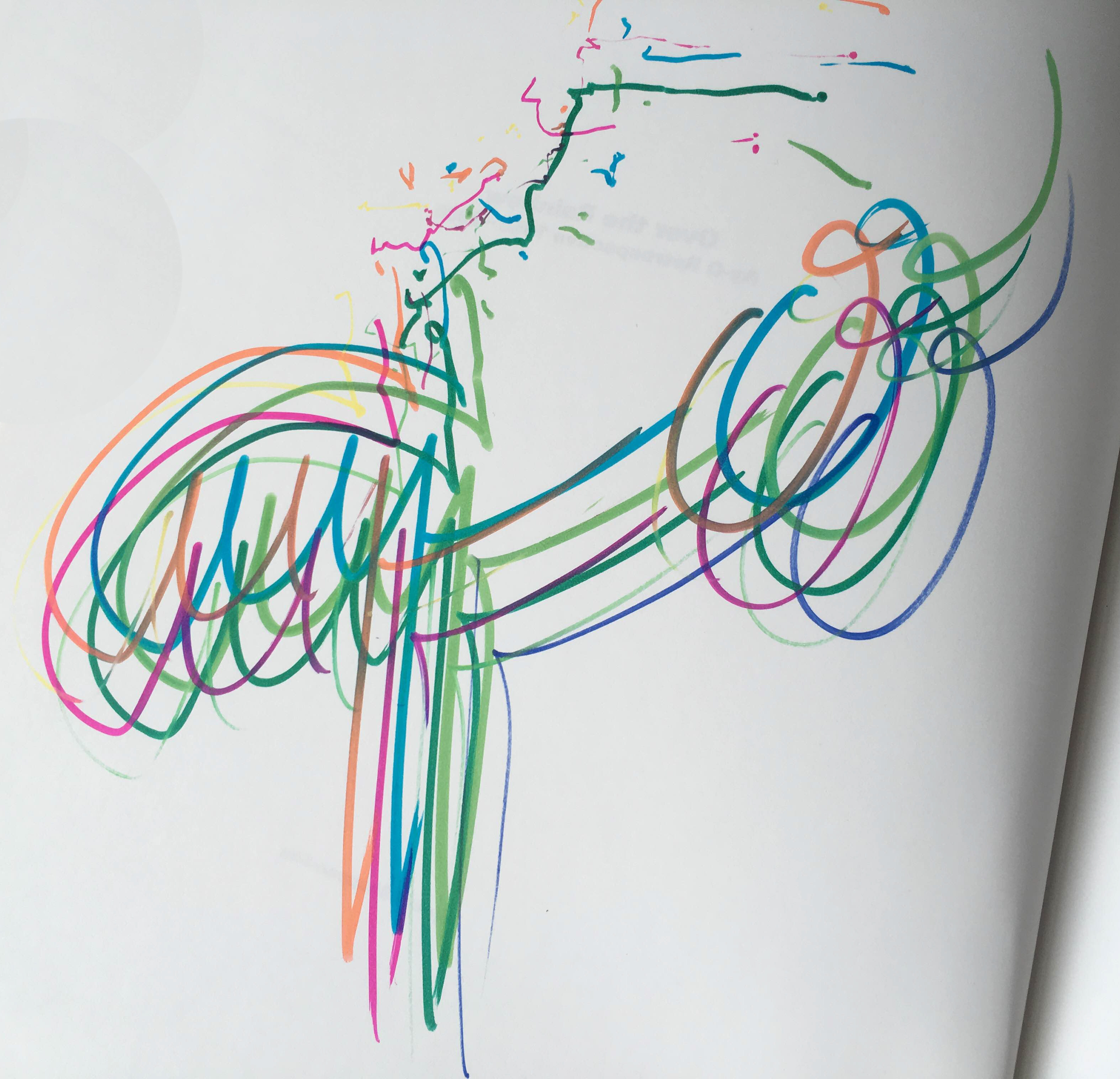
rainbow signature

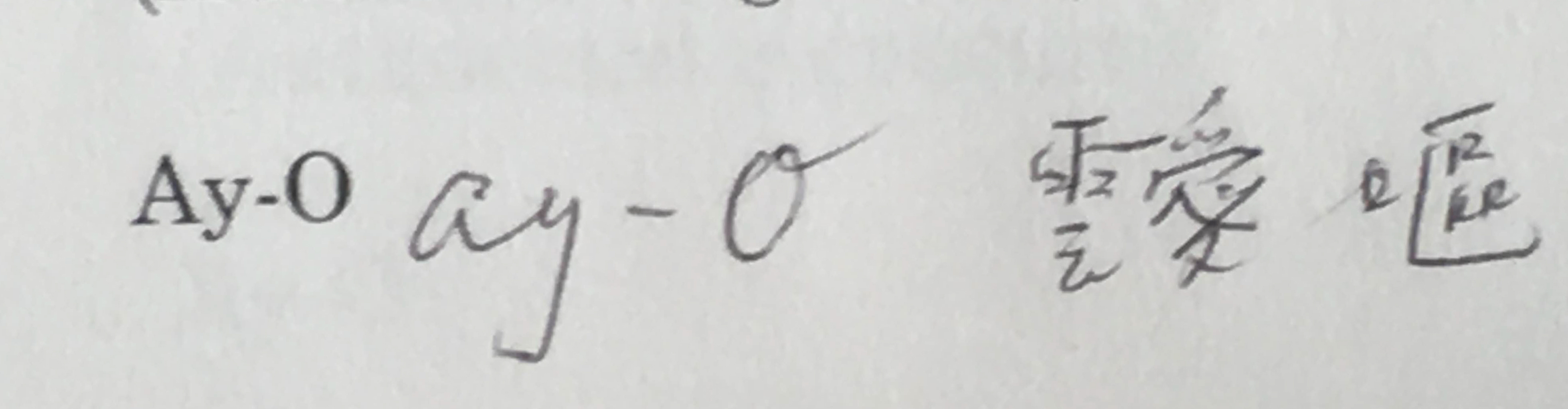
paper kanji and roman characters

== Publications ==
- Mr. Fluxus: A Collective Portrait of George Maciunas 1931–1978. Thames & Hudson. 1998.
- Niji: Ai O hanga zen sakuhinshu, 1954–1979. Sobunsha.
- Ouzel. Chikumasyobo Publishing. 1978.
- Over the Rainbow, Ay-O Retrospective 1950-2006. Bijutsu Shuppan-Sha. 2006. ISBN 978-4-568-10359-5.
- Ay-O over the Rainbow once more. 2012. ISBN 978-4-906702-01-5.
