= Kitaura, Ibaraki =

Dissolved municipality in Ibaraki prefecture, Japan

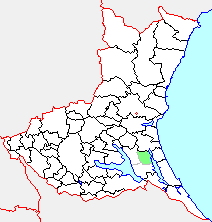
Map of Kitaura, Ibaraki

Kitaura (北浦町, Kitaura-machi) was a town located in Namegata District, Ibaraki Prefecture, Japan. It is now a part of the city of Namegata.

As of 2003, the town had an estimated population of 10,916 and a density of 199.56 persons per km^{2}. The total area was 54.70 km^{2}.

On September 2, 2005, Kitaura, along with the towns of Asō and Tamatsukuri (all from Namegata District), were merged to create the city of Namegata and it ceases as an independent municipality.
