= Kyōko Kagawa =

Japanese actress (born 1931)

- 香川 京子
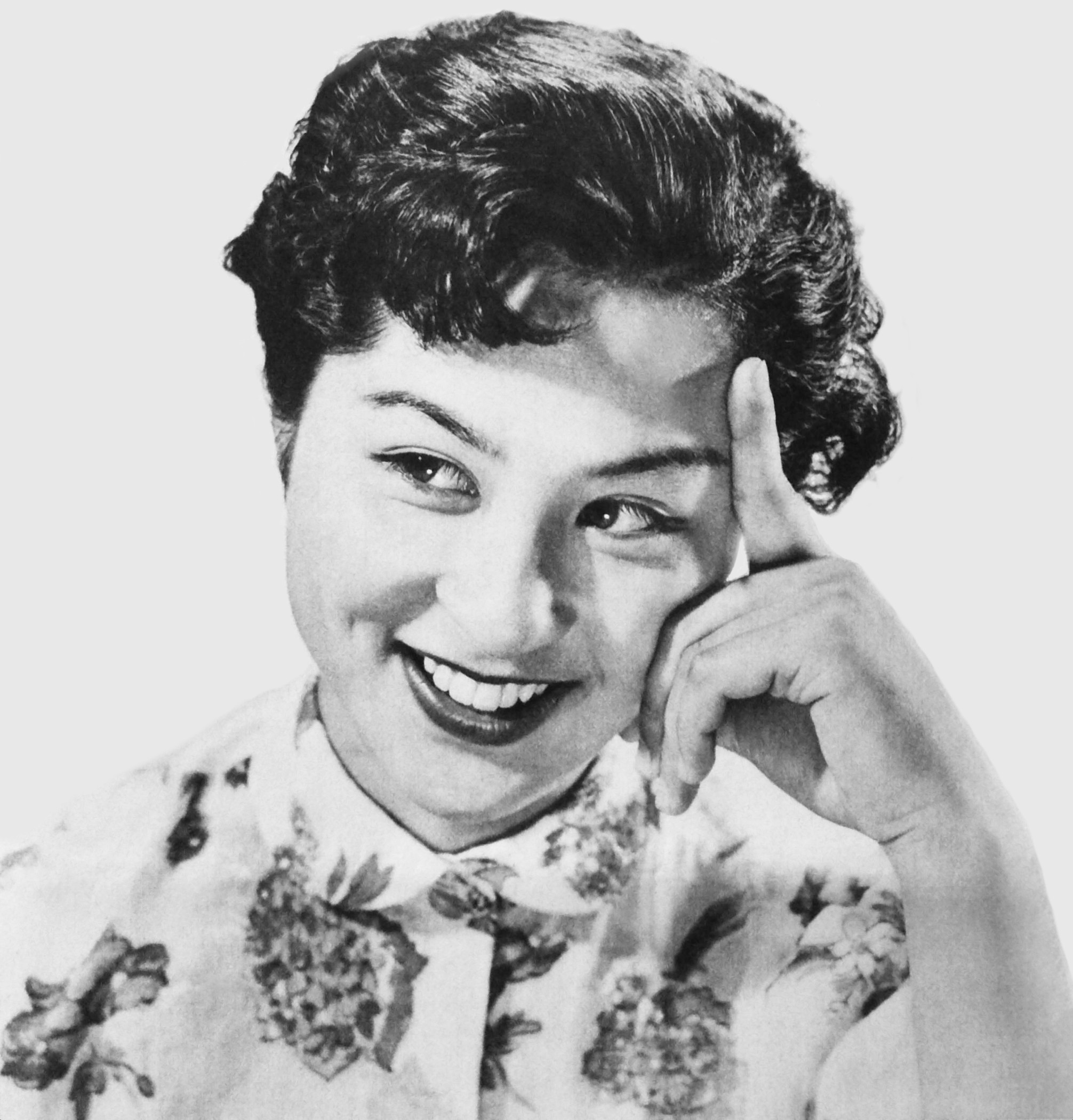
- Kyōko Kagawa in 1954
- Born: Kyoko Ikebe (池辺 香子); 5 December 1931 (age 94); Asō (currently Namegata), Ibaraki Prefecture, Japan
- Other name: Kyoko Makino (牧野 香子)
- Occupation: Actress
- Years active: 1950–present

Kyōko Kagawa (香川 京子, Kagawa Kyōko; born 5 December 1931) is a Japanese actress. During her career spanning 70 years, she has worked with directors like Akira Kurosawa, Kenji Mizoguchi, Yasujirō Ozu and Mikio Naruse, appearing in films such as Tokyo Story, Sansho the Bailiff, The Bad Sleep Well, Mothra, and High and Low.

== Biography ==
Kagawa was born in Asō (currently Namegata), Ibaraki Prefecture, and graduated from Tokyo Metropolitan Tenth High School for Girls in 1949. She was discovered in the "New Face Nomination" contest run by the Tokyo Shimbun in 1949 and gave her film debut the following year in Mado kara tobidase. A prolific actress, she collaborated with directors like Akira Kurosawa, Kenji Mizoguchi, Yasujirō Ozu, Mikio Naruse, Kinuyo Tanaka, Hiroshi Shimizu, Shiro Toyoda, Kozaburo Yoshimura, Ishiro Honda, Yuzo Kawashima, Tomu Uchida, Hiroshi Inagaki and Hirokazu Koreeda.

Kagawa married in 1963. After appearing in Kurosawa's Red Beard (1965), she followed her husband, a reporter for the Yomiuri Shimbun, to New York. Upon her return, she acted in television dramas until she appeared again on the big screen in Satsuo Yamamoto's Karei-naru Ichizoku (1974).

In 2011, the National Museum of Modern Art, Tokyo, honored her long career and contribution to Japanese cinema with an exhibition dedicated to her.

== Selected filmography ==
=== Films ===
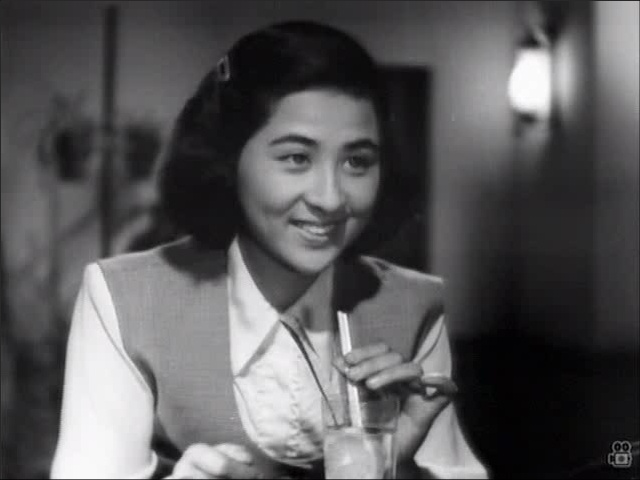
Kyōko Kagawa in Tokyo Heroine (1950)

- Tokyo Heroine (1950)
- Man in the Storm (1950)
- Mother (1952)
- Lightning (1952)
- Tokyo Story (1953)
- Love Letter (1953)
- Sansho the Bailiff (1954)
- The Crucified Lovers (1954)
- Onna no Koyomi (1954)
- The Shiinomi School
- Christ in Bronze (1956)
- A Cat, Shozo, and Two Women (1956)
- Shūu (1956)
- An Osaka Story (1957)
- The Lower Depths (1957)
- A Holiday in Tokyo (1958)
- Anzukko (1958)
- The Three Treasures (1959)
- The Bad Sleep Well (1960)
- Mothra (1961)
- The Story of Osaka Castle (1961)
- Girls of the Night (1961)
- High and Low (1963)
- Red Beard (1965)
- Karei-naru Ichizoku (1974)
- Kenji Mizoguchi: The Life of a Film Director (1975)
- Tora-san's Dream of Spring (1979)
- Shikibu Monogatari (1990)
- Madadayo (1993)
- After Life (1998)
- Letters from the Mountains (2002)
- Mifune: The Last Samurai (2016)
- Tenshi no Iru Toshokan (2017)
- Shimamori (2022)
- The Pass: Last Days of the Samurai (2022)

=== Television ===
- Hana no Shōgai (NHK, 1963)
- Kasuga no Tsubone (NHK, 1989)
- In This Corner of the World (TBS, 2018)

== Honours ==
- Medal with Purple Ribbon (1998)
- Kinuyo Tanaka Award (1993)
- Order of the Rising Sun (2004)
- FIAF Award (2011)
