= Highest 2 Lowest =

2025 film by Spike Lee

- Release poster
- Directed by: Spike Lee
- Screenplay by: Alan Fox
- Based on: High and Low by; Akira Kurosawa; Hideo Oguni; Ryūzō Kikushima; Eijirō Hisaita; King's Ransom by Ed McBain
- Produced by: Todd Black; Jason Michael Berman
- Starring: Denzel Washington; Jeffrey Wright; Ilfenesh Hadera; ASAP Rocky
- Cinematography: Matthew Libatique
- Edited by: Barry Alexander Brown; Allyson C. Johnson
- Music by: Howard Drossin
- Production companies: A24; Kurosawa Production; 40 Acres and a Mule Filmworks; Escape Artists; Mandalay Pictures
- Distributed by: A24; Apple Original Films
- Release dates: May 19, 2025 (Cannes); August 15, 2025 (United States); September 5, 2025 (Apple TV)
- Running time: 133 minutes
- Country: United States
- Language: English
- Box office: $1.5 million

Highest 2 Lowest is a 2025 American neo noir crime thriller film directed by Spike Lee from a screenplay by Alan Fox. It is an English-language remake of Akira Kurosawa's 1963 Japanese film High and Low, itself based on Ed McBain's 1959 novel King's Ransom. The film stars Denzel Washington, Jeffrey Wright, Ilfenesh Hadera, ASAP Rocky, John Douglas Thompson, Dean Winters, LaChanze, Princess Nokia, and Ice Spice (in her film debut). It is the fifth collaboration between Lee and Washington and the first since Inside Man (2006).

Principal photography began in New York City in March 2024 and wrapped that May. Highest 2 Lowest had its world premiere out of competition of the Cannes Film Festival on May 19, 2025, and was released theatrically in the United States by A24 on August 15 before becoming available on Apple TV+ on September 5. The film received generally positive reviews from critics, but was a box-office bomb.

== Plot ==
David King is a New York City music mogul, considered to have the "best ears in the business", and the founder of Stackin' Hits Records. Having once sold his majority interest in the company, he intends to buy back majority ownership to avert a buyout by a rival label. To regain majority ownership, King offers to buy out one of his two partners’ shares. To raise the cash for the deal, he puts up most of his personal assets, including his Dumbo penthouse home and collection of art by contemporary Black artists, as collateral.

The day the deal is to go through, King receives an anonymous call from a kidnapper demanding $17.5 million in Swiss 1,000-franc notes for the safe return of his son, Trey. King immediately calls the police and agrees with his wife, Pam, to pay the ransom, even though it risks the cash he needs for his business deal. But Trey is soon found safe, as the kidnapper has mistakenly taken Kyle, Trey's best friend and the son of King's driver and confidant, Paul Christopher.

The kidnapper still demands the money in exchange for Kyle's life. Despite King's willingness to ransom his own son, he is reluctant to do the same for Kyle. Paul and Trey both plead with King to save Kyle. King's business partner warns him that failing to do so will hurt the company's image. After a long night of soul-searching, King agrees to pay the ransom.

Following the kidnapper's instructions, King packs the money in an Air Jordan backpack, which the police mark with a GPS tracker, goes to Brooklyn's Borough Hall subway stop, and gets on a train to Yankee Stadium. Near the stadium, the kidnapper calls King and orders him to go between the train cars. Then an accomplice triggers the emergency brake, the train jerks to a halt, and the bag falls between the cars and through the ironwork of the elevated line to the street. Another accomplice, riding a moped, catches it, and the bag is subsequently handed off between additional accomplices on mopeds several times as they escape through the Puerto Rican Day Parade. When the police manage to catch the bagman, the money has already been removed. Kyle is released in a nearby park.

King's actions have made him a hero to the public, and several Stackin' Hits songs are climbing the charts. But King's lenders of the $17.5 million say he must repay them in two weeks or they will begin seizing the collateral he used to secure the loan, as it was agreed that the money was to be used only for the buyout. King broke the contract by using the money to pay Kyle's ransom rather than to buy shares of Stackin' Hits. Kyle cannot identify his kidnapper, but recalls hearing a distinctive hip-hop track while he was captive. King, listening to a playlist of demo tracks that Trey has put together for him to listen to, recognizes the voice of a rapper, Yung Felon, as the caller's. The police do not consider this decisive, so King and Paul, both armed, track down Yung Felon's address themselves. There, King meets his wife, Rosa, and infant son, David. Rosa tells him that "Archie" (Yung Felon's real name) is an ex-convict and aspiring rapper who idolizes King. Believing he wants to sign Archie to his label, Rosa directs King to his recording studio, where he confronts Archie. In an impromptu rap battle, Archie says he saw King as a father figure and resorted to the kidnapping after being ignored by him for years. A gunfight breaks out and Archie flees to a nearby elevated subway train station. King chases him to the platform and onto the train, finally catching him between cars and knocking him unconscious. Meanwhile, the detectives find the ransom money at Archie's apartment.

King offers Paul a chance to be part of the new label. Paul, whose left eye was cut by glass when Archie, shot at his car, "respectfully" declines. Archie takes a plea deal, accepting a 25-year prison sentence in return for another face-to-face meeting with King. When they meet, Archie tries to convince King to sign him. He has become the world's most-streamed musical artist since the kidnapping and says he has already turned down many lucrative offers. King says he has left Stackin' Hits Records to create a new, smaller label, and rejects Archie, who explodes in anger and disappointment.

At their penthouse, King, Pam, and Trey audition Sula, a singer-songwriter Trey discovered. Her performance of her song "Highest 2 Lowest" wows the Kings, who offer to sign her to their new label.

== Cast ==
- Denzel Washington as David King
- Jeffrey Wright as Paul Christopher
- Ilfenesh Hadera as Pam King
- ASAP Rocky as Archie/Yung Felon
- John Douglas Thompson as Detective Earl Bridges
- Dean Winters as Detective Higgins
- LaChanze as Detective Bell
- Aubrey Joseph as Trey King
- Elijah Wright as Kyle Christopher
- Michael Potts as Patrick Bethea
- Wendell Pierce as Gabe
- Destiny Frasqueri as Rosa Fuentes
- Isis Gaston as Marisol Cepeda
- Frederick Weller as Alex Cordova
- Nicholas Turturro as Frankie Da Lunatic
- Jensen McRae as June York
- Andy McQueen as Larry Friday
- Aiyana-Lee as Sula

Rick Fox, Rod Strickland, Don Lemon, Eddie Palmieri, Anthony Ramos, and Rosie Perez appear as themselves.

== Production ==
Spike Lee received Alan Fox's original script before the COVID-19 pandemic and was involved with rewriting it after Denzel Washington agreed to star. The revision took the form of an adaptation of Akira Kurosawa's film High and Low. In February 2024, the film was announced, to be produced by A24, Todd Black for Escape Artists, and Jason Michael Berman for Mandalay Pictures, with Lee as director and executive producer through his 40 Acres and a Mule Filmworks label. It is the fifth collaboration between Lee and Washington and their most recent since Inside Man (2006). Ilfenesh Hadera, Jeffrey Wright, and Ice Spice joined the cast in the following months. According to Lee, ASAP Rocky has the "main role" in the film. ASAP Rocky also created two songs for the soundtrack, "Both Eyes Closed" and "Trunks". Principal photography began in New York City on March 4, 2024, with Matthew Libatique as cinematographer, and wrapped on May 31. The production design featured reproductions of paintings in Lee's art collection, including works by Jean-Michel Basquiat, Kehinde Wiley, Deborah Roberts, and Frederick J. Brown.

=== Music ===
A24 Music released the soundtrack on August 15, 2025. It has 19 tracks, including original songs by ASAP Rocky, Aiyana-Lee, and Jensen McRae. A score album by Howard Drossin and an EP of music by pianist and composer Fergus McCreadie were also released.

== Release and reception ==
In April 2025, Thierry Frémaux, artistic director of the Cannes Film Festival, confirmed that Highest 2 Lowest would premiere out of competition at the Cannes Film Festival on May 19, 2025. The festival's official lineup announcement did not include the film as it was awaiting confirmation that Washington would attend. The film was scheduled to be released theatrically by A24 on August 22 before becoming available to stream on Apple TV on September 5. Its theatrical release was later moved up to August 15.

=== Box office ===
The film underperformed at the box office on its opening weekend, with numbers apparently "so weak that A24 and Apple Studios took the unorthodox step of not releasing box-office numbers at all". Variety wrote that it was the latest film to guest-star a famous musician but fail to reap the anticipated profits.

=== Critical response ===
On the review aggregator website Rotten Tomatoes, 83% of 234 critics' reviews are positive, with an average rating of 7.1/10. The website's consensus reads: "Spike Lee and Denzel Washington remix a classic with vibrantly contemporary results in Highest 2 Lowest, a swaggering thriller that lovingly showcases New York City." Metacritic, which uses a weighted average, assigned the film a score of 74 out of 100, based on 47 critics, indicating "generally favorable" reviews.

Robert Daniels of RogerEbert.com gave the film three and a half out of four stars and wrote, "While many will come to Highest 2 Lowest craving the angst of Kurosawa's masterpiece, for once Lee isn't setting out to copy what was great before. He is using the past as a starting point to launch into what may be the final phase of his career. He is wielding a plethora of inspirations—musical, cinematic, and historical—to reunite with an old friend. He is making a Spike Lee joint. And it's exceptional." David Ehrlich of IndieWire gave the film a B, writing, "Lee is so much more interesting for what he brings to a project than for what he takes away from it, and Highest 2 Lowest is naturally at its best when it deviates from its source material." Richard Brody of The New Yorker wrote, "Lee turns the story into what is one of his most personal films, both emotionally and intellectually" and "Oddly, the move comes not as a renunciation but as a new adventure. The movie’s subject may be production, but the director is striking boldly out into a strange new artistic world."

Donald Clark of The Irish Times gave Highest 2 Lowest two out of five stars and wrote, "Too much of Highest 2 Lowest feels knocked off in a hugely expensive hurry" and "The film is never boring, but, once that delightful opening winds down, the action clunks where it should purr."

=== Accolades ===
Award	Date of ceremony	Category	Recipient(s)	Result	Ref.
AARP Movies for Grownups Awards	January 10, 2026	Best Director	Spike Lee	Nominated	
Black Reel Awards	February 16, 2026	Outstanding Film	Highest 2 Lowest	Nominated	
Black Reel Awards	February 16, 2026	Outstanding Director	Spike Lee	Nominated	
Black Reel Awards	February 16, 2026	Outstanding Lead Performance	Denzel Washington	Nominated	
Black Reel Awards	February 16, 2026	Outstanding Supporting Performance	Jeffrey Wright	Nominated	
Black Reel Awards	February 16, 2026	Outstanding Supporting Performance	ASAP Rocky	Nominated	
Black Reel Awards	February 16, 2026	Outstanding Breakthrough Performance	ASAP Rocky	Nominated	
Black Reel Awards	February 16, 2026	Outstanding Ensemble	Kim Coleman	Nominated	
Black Reel Awards	February 16, 2026	Outstanding Original Score	Howard Drossin	Nominated	
Black Reel Awards	February 16, 2026	Outstanding Original Soundtrack	Highest 2 Lowest	Nominated	
Black Reel Awards	February 16, 2026	Outstanding Original Song	Aiyana-Lee Anderson and Nicole Daciana Anderson (for "Highest 2 Lowest")	Nominated	
Black Reel Awards	February 16, 2026	Outstanding Costume Design	Francine Jamison-Tanchuck	Nominated	
Celebration of Cinema and Television	December 9, 2025	Career Achievement Award	Spike Lee	Won	
Georgia Film Critics Association	December 27, 2025	Best Original Song	Aiyana-Lee Anderson and Nicole Daciana Anderson (for "Highest 2 Lowest")	Nominated	
Gotham Independent Film Awards	December 1, 2025	Breakthrough Performer	ASAP Rocky	Nominated	
Hollywood Music in Media Awards	November 19, 2025	Best Original Song in an Independent Film	Aiyana-Lee Anderson and Nicole Daciana Anderson (for "Highest 2 Lowest")	Won	
NAACP Image Awards	February 28, 2026	Outstanding Motion Picture	Highest 2 Lowest	Nominated	
NAACP Image Awards	February 28, 2026	Outstanding Actor in a Motion Picture	Denzel Washington	Nominated	
NAACP Image Awards	February 28, 2026	Outstanding Supporting Actor in a Motion Picture	Jeffrey Wright	Nominated	
NAACP Image Awards	February 28, 2026	Outstanding Supporting Actor in a Motion Picture	ASAP Rocky	Nominated	
NAACP Image Awards	February 28, 2026	Outstanding Breakthrough Performance in a Motion Picture	ASAP Rocky	Nominated	
NAACP Image Awards	February 28, 2026	Outstanding Ensemble Cast in a Motion Picture	Denzel Washington, Jeffrey Wright, Ilfenesh Hadera, A$AP Rocky	Nominated	
NAACP Image Awards	February 28, 2026	Outstanding Soundtrack/Compilation Album	Highest 2 Lowest (Original Soundtrack)	Nominated	
San Diego Film Critics Society	December 15, 2025	Best Supporting Actor	Jeffrey Wright	Nominated	
San Diego Film Critics Society	December 15, 2025	Best Editing	Barry Alexander Brown and Allyson C. Johnson	Nominated	
Saturn Awards	March 8, 2026	Best Thriller Film	Highest 2 Lowest	Nominated	
Savannah Film Festival	October 28, 2025	Legend of Cinema Award	Spike Lee	Won	

== See also ==
- List of films set in New York City
- New York City Subway in popular culture
