= Namegata District =

Former district in Ibaraki prefecture, Japan

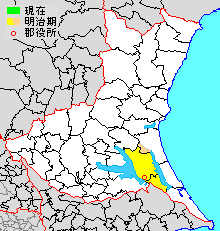
Namegata district

Namegata District (行方郡, Namegata-gun) was a district located in Ibaraki Prefecture, Japan.

As of 2003, the district has an estimated population of 40,930 and a density of 246.08 persons per km^{2}. The total area is 166.33 km^{2}.

== District timeline ==
- April 1, 2001 - The town of Itako absorbed the town of Ushibori to create the city of Itako.
- September 2, 2005 - The towns of Asō, Kitaura and Tamatsukuri were merged to create the city of Namegata. Therefore, Namegata District was dissolved as a result of this merger.
