= Tamatsukuri =

Dissolved municipality in Ibaraki prefecture, Japan

Coordinates: 36°06′N 140°25′E

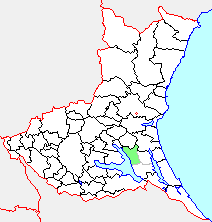
Map of Tamatsukuri, Ibaraki

Tamatsukuri (玉造町, Tamatsukuri-machi) was a town located in Namegata District, Ibaraki Prefecture, Japan. It is now a part of the city of Namegata.

As of 2003, the town had an estimated population of 13,793 and a density of 269.13 persons per km^{2}. The total area was 51.25 km^{2}.

On September 2, 2005, Tamatsukuri, along with the towns of Asō and Kitaura (all from Namegata District), were merged to create the city of Namegata and it ceases as an independent municipality.
