= High and Low (1963 film) =

1963 Japanese police procedural film by Akira Kurosawa

- Theatrical release poster
- Directed by: Akira Kurosawa
- Screenplay by: Hideo Oguni; Ryūzō Kikushima; Eijirō Hisaita; Akira Kurosawa
- Based on: King's Ransom by Evan Hunter
- Produced by: Ryūzō Kikushima; Tomoyuki Tanaka
- Starring: Toshirō Mifune; Tatsuya Nakadai; Kyōko Kagawa; Tatsuya Mihashi
- Cinematography: Asakazu Nakai; Takao Saitō
- Edited by: Akira Kurosawa
- Music by: Masaru Satō
- Production companies: Kurosawa Films; Toho
- Distributed by: Toho
- Release date: 1 March 1963 (Japan)
- Running time: 143 minutes
- Country: Japan
- Language: Japanese
- Budget: ¥230 million
- Box office: ¥460.2 million

High and Low (Japanese: 天国と地獄, Hepburn: Tengoku to Jigoku; lit. 'Heaven and Hell') is a 1963 Japanese police procedural film directed by Akira Kurosawa. It was written by Kurosawa, Hideo Oguni, Eijirō Hisaita, and Ryūzō Kikushima as a loose adaptation of the 1959 novel King's Ransom by Evan Hunter. Starring Toshirō Mifune, Tatsuya Nakadai, Kyōko Kagawa and Tatsuya Mihashi, it tells the story of Japanese businessman Kingo Gondō (Mifune) struggling for control of the major shoe company of which he is a board member. He plans a leveraged buyout of the company with his life savings when a kidnapper mistakenly abducts his chauffeur's son to ransom him for ¥30 million. (Note: Equivalent to ¥154 million in 2024) The film is viewed as influential on police procedural cinema, and has been remade multiple times internationally.

The film was produced by Toho, which bought the rights to Hunter's novel in 1961 for $5,000. (Note: Equivalent to $53,870 in 2025) Working on a production budget of ¥230 million, (Note: Equivalent to ¥1.18 billion in 2024) High and Low began filming on 2 September 1962, taking place on location in Yokohama and on set at Toho Studios. Only one attempt could be made to film the ransom exchange. The shoot required multiple cameramen, leading to all other film productions being shut down for the day. Filming ended on 30 January 1963. Kurosawa worked with Masaru Satō to score the film in their eighth collaboration; the film's soundtrack contains a variety of influences, including mambo, classical, and modern popular music. Post-production took just under a month and, after test screenings in mid-February 1963, the film received a wide distribution.

High and Low was released in Japan on 1 March 1963 and became the highest-grossing film at the Japanese box office for that year. The film received generally positive reviews both domestically and abroad. In September 1963, the film was entered into the Official Selection for the Venice Film Festival. The limited American release of the film in late November coincided with the assassination of President John F. Kennedy, an event that led to a depression in initial box office takings. High and Low was nominated for Best Foreign Film at the Golden Globe Awards for 1964. Critical opinion of the film has remained high, with analyses of the film focusing on Kurosawa's humanism in tackling the issue of a growing class divide, the growth of an international consumer culture, and the film's use of structure to interrogate morality and social division.

== Plot ==
Wealthy executive Kingo Gondō is engaged in a struggle to gain control of the company National Shoes. The board of the company is split between executives seeking to make cheap and low-quality shoes, and the ageing largest shareholder who makes sturdy but unfashionable shoes. Gondō rejects these plans, envisioning a strategy requiring high production costs for long-term profitability. He has secretly set up a leveraged buyout to gain control of the company, mortgaging all his property. Just as he is about to put the plan into action, Gondō receives a phone call from someone claiming to have kidnapped his son, Jun, for a ransom of ¥30 million. Gondō is prepared to pay the ransom, but the call is dismissed as a prank when Jun returns home from playing outside. However, Jun's playmate Shin'ichi, the child of Gondō's chauffeur, is missing as the kidnappers had mistakenly abducted him instead.

In another phone call, the kidnapper reveals that he has discovered his mistake but still demands the same ransom. Gondō is forced to make a decision whether to pay the ransom to save the child or complete the buyout. After contemplating it, Gondō announces that he will not pay the ransom, fearing that doing so would jeopardise his job, his finances, and the future of his family. His plans are thwarted when his top aide, Kawanishi, lets the "cheap shoes" faction know about the kidnapping in return for a promotion should they take over. Finally, after continuous pleading from the chauffeur and under pressure from his wife, Gondō decides to pay the ransom. The evening prior to the ransom exchange, with police assistance, Gondō fixes two briefcases to contain pods that release a foul odour when submerged in water or pink smoke when burnt. Following the kidnapper's instructions, the money is put into the briefcases and thrown out from a moving train as police attempt to monitor the area. Shin'ichi is safely recovered at the site of the money drop.

The police undertake an investigation using clues from the kidnapper's phone calls and Shin'ichi's memory to determine his identity. They eventually find the hideout where Shin'ichi was kept prisoner, discovering two bodies of the kidnapper's accomplices suspiciously killed by an overdose of heroin. The police surmise that the kidnapper engineered their deaths by supplying them with uncut drugs. Meanwhile, Gondō is forced out of the company and his creditors demand the collateral put up against his loan in lieu of the debt. Seeking the support of the press, the police encourage them to report the story widely and help misdirect the kidnapper with a false report. Gondō is seen as a hero, while the National Shoes Company is vilified. Further clues, culminating in a plume of pink smoke, lead to the identity of the kidnapper: Ginjirō Takeuchi, a medical intern at a nearby hospital. However, the police lack hard evidence to link him to the murder of his accomplices.

The police lay a trap by first planting a false story in the newspapers implying that the accomplices are still alive, and then forging a note from them demanding more drugs. Concerned about his accomplices, Takeuchi tests the drugs' strength on another drug addict who overdoses and dies. He is later apprehended at the accomplices' hideout by the police while trying to supply another lethal dose of uncut heroin. Most of the ransom money is recovered, but it is too late to save Gondō's property from auction. With Takeuchi facing a death sentence, he requests to see Gondō while in prison. Gondō agrees to meet him face to face. By this time, Gondō is working for a rival shoe company, earning less money but enjoying much more freedom in running it. Takeuchi tells Gondō that he has no regrets for his actions, explaining that envy from seeing Gondō's house on the hill every day led him to conceive of the crime. Gradually losing his composure, he shrieks as he is dragged away and a screen divides the two of them, leaving Gondō alone.

== Cast ==
=== Main cast ===
- Toshirō Mifune as Kingo Gondō (権藤金吾, Gondō Kingo)
- Tatsuya Nakadai as Inspector Tokura (戸倉警部), the chief investigator in the kidnapping case.
- Kyōko Kagawa as Reiko Gondō (権藤伶子, Gondō Reiko)
- Tatsuya Mihashi as Kawanishi (河西), Gondō's secretary.
- Kenjiro Ishiyama as Chief Detective 'Bos'n' Taguchi (田口), Tokura's partner.
- Isao Kimura as Detective Arai (荒井)
- Takeshi Katō as Detective Nakao (中尾)
- Yutaka Sada as Aoki (青木), Gondō's chauffeur.
- Tsutomu Yamazaki as Ginjirō Takeuchi (竹内銀次郎, Takeuchi Ginjirō), the mastermind and chief instigator of the kidnapping plot.
- Takashi Shimura as the Chief of the Investigation Section
- Susumu Fujita as Manager of Investigations
- Yoshio Tsuchiya as Detective Murata (村田)
- Jun Tazaki as Kamiya, National Shoes Publicity Director (神谷)
- Nobuo Nakamura as Ishimaru, National Shoes Design Department Director (石丸)
- Yunosuke Ito as Baba, National Shoes Executive (馬場)
- Toshio Egi as Jun Gondō (権藤純, Gondō Jun)
- Masahiko Shimizu as Shin'ichi Aoki (青木進一, Aoki Shin'ichi), the chauffeur's son who is kidnapped at the beginning of the film.

=== Other characters ===
- Kōji Mitsui as reporter
- Minoru Chiaki as reporter
- Eijirō Tōno as factory worker
- Kamatari Fujiwara as incineration worker
- Masao Shimizu as prison director
- Kyū Sazanka as creditor
- Akira Nagoya as Yamamoto
- Kō Nishimura as creditor
- Jun Hamamura as creditor
- Ikio Sawamura as trolley man
- Kin Sugai as addict
- Masao Oda as executor
- Gen Shimizu as chief physician

== Production ==
=== Development ===
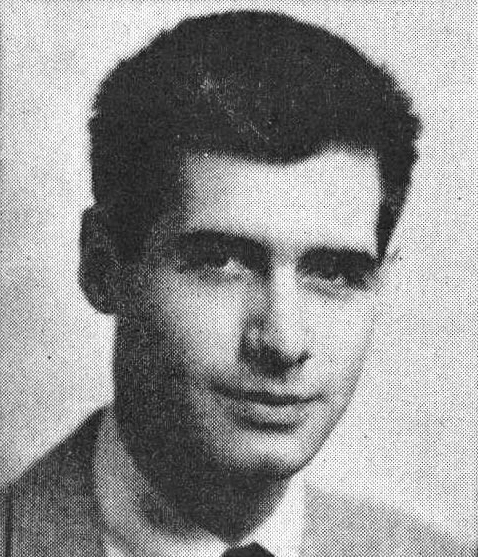
Evan Hunter (credited under his pen name Ed McBain) c. 1953

High and Low's screenplay was co-written by Akira Kurosawa, Hideo Oguni, Eijirō Hisaita, and Ryūzō Kikushima. The story is based on Evan Hunter's novel King's Ransom (1959). Toho purchased the rights to adapt the novel in 1961 for $5,000. The film contains significant differences from the novel. Much of the High and Low's story during and after the ransom exchange is not derived from the original work. The film departs from the novel by placing emphasis on social issues and the class perspective of the protagonist; drugs are featured; and unlike Hunter's protagonist, Gondō does not catch the kidnapper himself. The script was originally written with an ending that depicted Inspector Tokura and Gondō having a conversation.

The script was written straight-to-final draft (a process that creates a production-ready screenplay without writing prior drafts and treatments), similarly to Yojimbo (1961) and Sanjuro (1962) before it. Kurosawa told the film historian Donald Richie after the release of Red Beard (1965) that he made High and Low because his friend's son was kidnapped. In an interview with Joan Mellen, Kurosawa said that one reason he decided to make the film was due to his frustration with the lenient penalties for kidnapping under Japanese law applied at the time, believing they did not adequately reflect the suffering endured by victims and their families. Although Kurosawa was not particularly impressed by Hunter's writing, he found the novel's kidnapping premise compelling. While appalled by the cruelty and audacity of the crime, he also felt that Yamazaki's circumstances made him a character worthy of some sympathy.

=== Pre-production and production ===
The film had a budget of ¥230 million. Pre-production began on 20 July 1962, when Kurosawa began casting roles that had not yet been filled. He cast Tsutomu Yamazaki to play the role of the kidnapper, possibly at the suggestion of his former assistant, Hiromichi Horikawa, who had directed Yamazaki in the film My Daughter and I (1962). Yamazaki recalled feeling anxious and nauseous during the audition, calming down only after he began exchanging lines with Kurosawa. The role brought him considerable acting success, appearing in two more of Kurosawa's films—Red Beard and Kagemusha (1980)—and starring in the TV series Hissatsu Shiokinin (1973). Kurosawa also included cameos by his previous collaborators, including Susumu Fujita, the star of his first film Sanshiro Sugata (1943), and character actor Masao Shimizu.

High and Low was filmed at Toho Studios and on location in Yokohama. The film was shot using TohoScope, a widescreen filming system. Filming began on 2 September 1962 with the first act, the majority of which was filmed at Toho Studios. Many of the takes shot for the film's first half were ten minutes long, and it is possible that they would have been longer if the capacities of the cameras' magazines were larger. Two different sets were used to film Gondō's home overlooking Yokohama. One was constructed on location, overlooking the city. The night scenes, showing the same location and view, were filmed with a miniature display outside the window, as the exterior of the location set could not be photographed well at night. Long-distance lenses were used, particularly to obtain close-ups, as the camera rarely entered the set. The set was constructed as a room with an open wall. During the production of his films, Kurosawa would take his frustrations out on the cast and crew, a pattern that became worse during High and Low's creation—it was here that his reputation of making difficulties for the studio and those working on the film began to precede him.

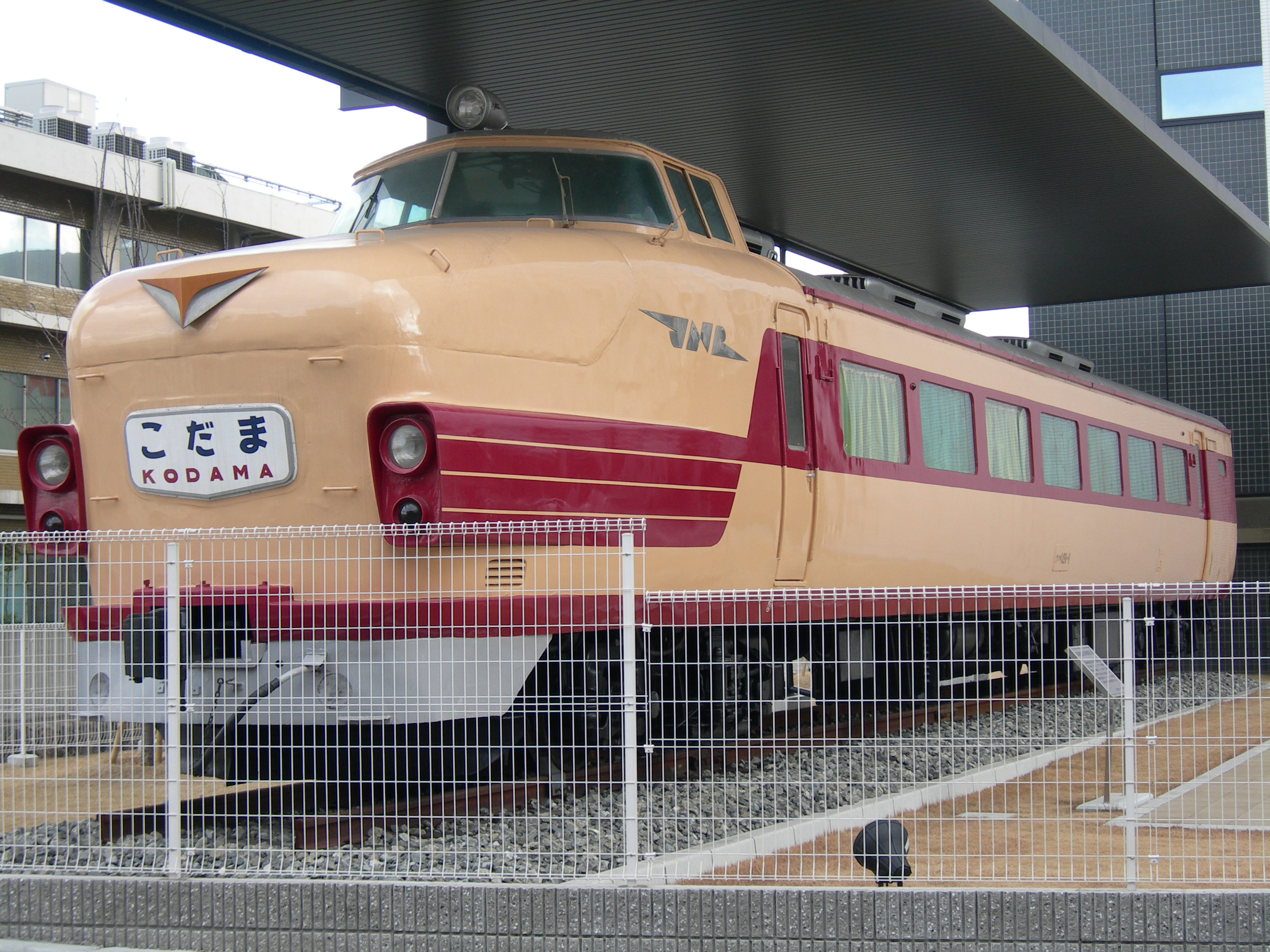
A preserved Kodama express train, as seen in the film

The ransom exchange sequence (wherein money is dropped through the open window of a Kodama express train) required nine cameras to film and was shot almost entirely with hand-helds. All the cameramen at Toho were required to film simultaneously, which led to every other film production being shut down for the day. One camera was positioned under the bridge where the money drop took place, two 8 mm cameras photographed the kidnappers at the ends of the train, and detectives were each followed by two cameras. There was only one attempt to film the scene due to the reservation and use of the express train. During the take, one of the cameras following Takeshi Katō on the train malfunctioned and did not capture the scene. The crew had to reshoot his part on a different day. According to script supervisor Teruyo Nogami, during this scene, a nearby building obscured the face of one of the kidnapper's accomplices. To fix the issue, alterations were made to the second floor of the building with a blue sheet used to disguise these alterations, a job conceived and executed just a day before filming took place. However, film critic Atsushi Kobayashi writes that it was instead a prefabricated construction worker's dormitory, which was removed by stagehands, that was blocking the view of the kidnapped child Shin'ichi.

The Yokohama exteriors were filmed in January 1963, but the cold weather made it difficult to act convincingly as if it were summer. For one scene, Kurosawa dyed the nearby river with black paint and poured dirt into it to make the environment filthier. The scene depicting a slum where the kidnapper buys a second lethal dose of heroin was shot on set, but was modelled after Koganechō, which was a hotbed of sex work and drug trafficking. The police accompanied location scouters to the area due to the danger. The location of the final scene took inspiration from prisons in other countries, installing glass doors and wire mesh behind the windows. An additional large set was made for the original final scene that depicted a conversation between Gondō and Inspector Tokura. While filming the final scene, Yamazaki burnt his hands on the wire mesh from the heat of the lighting. Filming ended on 30 January 1963.

=== Editing ===
The use of multiple cameras simultaneously during the film's first half meant that a ten-minute scene would have a corresponding hour of footage to cut between. The ransom exchange sequence, filmed using multiple camera perspectives, was an unprecedented shoot that required Kurosawa's particular attention during the editing process. Kurosawa employed colour for the first time in his career midway through the film. The use of a trail of pink smoke in a pair of shots drives the investigation forward. According to film theorist Noël Burch, the moment acts as a singularising pivot that determines the investigative response. At this point in his career, Kurosawa felt that he and his crew were still too unfamiliar with the use of colour in film, and so decided to continue shooting films in black and white.

The original script ending was changed when Kurosawa noted the performance of Yamazaki as being especially powerful. The original final scene contained a reflective conversation between Mifune and Nakadai. The crew spent two weeks filming the scene that initially followed the confrontation between Gondō and the kidnapper Takeuchi, but Kurosawa ultimately decided to cut it in favour of the final ending. The film was test-screened in mid-February. The final cut is 3,924 metres (12,874 ft) of film in length.

=== Music ===
High and Low was scored by Masaru Satō—his eighth collaboration with Akira Kurosawa. The film includes music from The H-Man (1958), also by Satō, such as "The Magic Begins" sung by Yumi Shirakawa. The opening titles feature a slow mambo, which is used as a tone-setter and thereafter used sparingly throughout the rest of the film. Satō was inspired by his mentor Fumio Hayasaka's final work, which had been influenced by rhythmless jazz music, and so composed the opening titles as a conscious development of their work together on Hayasaka's final film soundtrack I Live in Fear (1955). During the scene where the kidnapper is first seen by the audience, Franz Schubert's Trout Quintet can be heard on the radio. Kurosawa had originally wanted to use "Greenfields" by The Brothers Four and Elvis Presley's "It's Now or Never", but could not buy the rights. Satō composed some original jazz music for the film, which can be heard in scenes around the city of Yokohama.

To Kurosawa, music in films was supposed to reflect the mood of the scene, with its context and volume under tight control. The music's context either supports or contrasts the image by way of aural cues, for example, the use of trumpets with the discovery of new leads in the film to amplify the success of the investigation. When the police are in pursuit of the kidnapper, the Neapolitan song "'O sole mio" is played, but during climactic scenes, the relative lack of music was intentional so as not to disrupt important or dramatic moments.

== Themes ==
=== Morality and the class divide ===
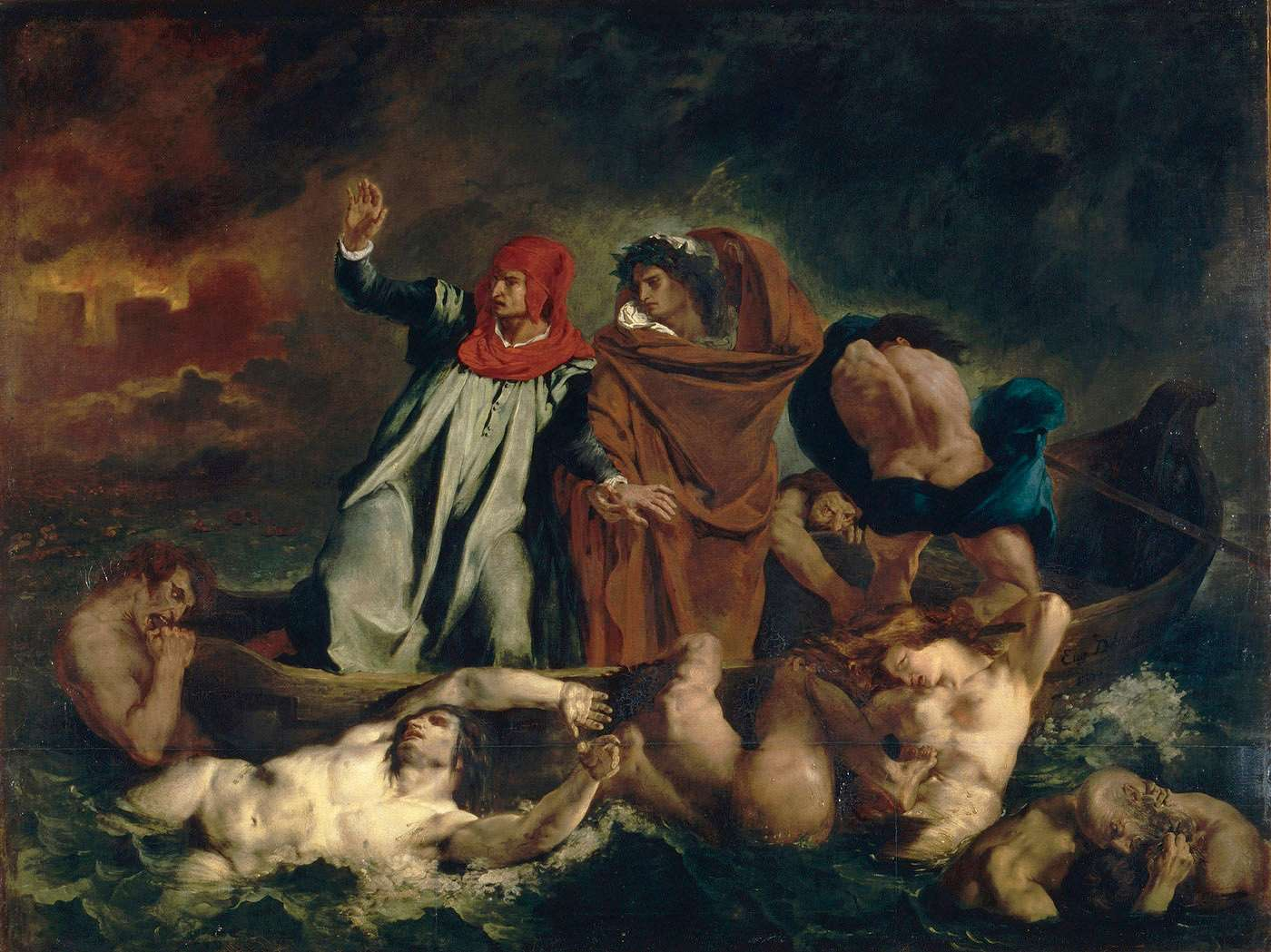
The scholar Donald Richie analogises Gondō and the police to Dante and Virgil in the Divine Comedy as parties to a moral conflict.

The film scholars Michael Ryan and Melissa Lenos emphasise that High and Low's story is one of moral choice. They analyse the film's morality through Kurosawa's depiction of composition, space, and blocking. In his analysis of intertextuality, Donald Richie, an acquaintance of Kurosawa and film historian, notes the oppositional extremity of High and Low's Japanese title, Tengoku to Jigoku—which translates to 'heaven and hell'—and underlines that by comparing the depiction of Yokohama to Dante Alighieri's narrative poem the Divine Comedy (c. 1320). In this comparison, Gondō takes on the role of Dante, at first unaware of the moral conflict ahead of him, with the accompanying police representing the angels, demigods, and Virgil. To Richie, the moral character of the film is black and white: Kurosawa aligns Gondō with the representatives of heaven, with 'heaven' and 'hell' contrasted until Gondō and Takeuchi are forced to reconcile with the fact that they had caused each other pain. Stuart Galbraith IV also invokes Dante in the depiction of the film's environment, noting that while Gondō's 'heavenly' house looks down on the people below, this is contrasted with a 'hell' in Yokohama "that is, in part at least, seductive." He further proposes that Gondō's nouveau riche background and moral compass matches that of Kurosawa and Mifune's own.

When asked in 1975 whether it was correct to view the film as being anti-capitalist, Kurosawa responded:

Well, I did not want to say so formally. I always have many issues about which I am angry, including capitalism. Although I don't intend explicitly to put my feelings and principles into films, these angers slowly seep through. They naturally penetrate my filmmaking.

According to Stephen Prince, the film's narrative creates a false reality via images and technologies (such as radios, cameras, telephones, and tape recorders). The perspective mediated by these technologies conceals the social tensions between the lives of Gondō and Takeuchi. He underscores this by focusing on how Kurosawa's use of blocking positions the characters to create and reflect different social and moral relationships. The social divisions are never reconciled and synthesised, but remain hidden by Gondō's appeal to humanism to overcome these divisions in his final confrontation with the kidnapper. Mitsuhiro Yoshimoto considers its class commentary reactionary for de-emphasising Gondō's class status by sympathising with him to promote a humanistic ideal instead. However, the film scholar James Goodwin views this class divide as being dramatised by Gondō's loss of wealth, as such, the superimposed images of Gondō and the kidnappers' faces over each other in the final scene visually associates them with a shared psychology. The historian David Conrad comments upon a reversal of the usual association of Kurosawa's films with humanism: that the film ends by condoning capital punishment as an acceptable outcome of the justice system.

=== Commercialism and modern Japan ===
To Conrad, the film's foregrounding of Japan's economic growth (such as the proliferation of personal luxuries, cars, and air conditioning) reflects the country's growing internationalism. This growth of international and consumer culture is seen in elements such as the Old West cowboy outfits Jun and Shin'ichi are seen wearing, and the nightclub seen towards the end of the film. He describes "the specter of miscegenation" that is evoked in the nightclub scene by having foreign men and Japanese women dancing together. The scene highlights the contemporary social restriction on interracial dating while subtly placing foreign influence under suspicion by linking it to the location of criminal activity. In particular, Conrad draws attention to the drug-related crime and waste management as concerns of contemporary society, as indicated by the police's investigation. The role of the police has also been criticised by film scholar James Maxfield as revealing the structure of Japan's capitalist society itself to be "a significant crime". He suggests that the police's inaction to save an addict who becomes a victim of the kidnapper's uncut heroin characterises them as uncaring. This "slightly undermines the viewers' sense of their unalloyed triumph in capturing [the kidnapper]."

Also commenting on the changes in Japanese society, Mitsuhiro Yoshimoto wrote about the film as an embodiment of urban anxiety during Japan's post–World War II recovery. As Yokohama was rebuilt, its streets and society did not fit with older maps of the area. Yoshimoto thus views the characters' subjectivities as being formed by the contemporary redevelopment of Yokohama, the detectives having to interpret the new social and spatial changes to progress in the investigation. He concludes that despite this, the film does not fully reflect a renewed sense of national identity, however. Ryan and Lenos argue that High and Low's use of blocking and symmetrical images are contrasted in the film's first and second halves. Both Gondō and the kidnapper represent a pernicious American cultural influence, but while the first half sees Gondō gradually reintegrated into group compositions, the kidnapper is framed individually. They argue that the film makes an argument in favour of conservatism in Japan.

Film scholar Mike Phillips identifies in the film a critique of early financialisation (a change in economies that places more emphasis on financial services rather than material goods). He sees High and Low as encouraging a material culture by referencing and incorporating the contemporary growth in consumerism and popular culture—symbols of financialisation that are undesirable aspects of the new society—onto the film stock itself. To Phillips, the Old West outfits worn by Jun and Shin'ichi embody this shift from a material, manufacturing culture, to a consumerist culture. TV Westerns are understood as aspects of an "ephemerality" that allows the kidnapper to treat the children as interchangeable commodities that have value without the kidnapper producing anything himself. To Phillips the film's final scene presents a dialectic relationship between Gondō and the kidnapper. Gondō's reflection in the window (which is visually linked to a reflection in the screen of a switched-off television set) embodies a material rejection of television as a symbol of this cultural commodification.

=== Structure ===
Kingo Gondō's expensive house (background) and the houses of the shanty town downhill (middle ground) framed together in the film

The film journalist Eric San Juan describes High and Low as a "deliberately structured" film that uses its plot layout to provide a social critique and abstracted view of the class divide. Prince notes, in his study of Kurosawa's filmography, a dialectical structure in the film. The narrative change from the wealthy Gondō's home to the shanty town below offers an opposing view to the ordered and confined space of the first half. The use of a police investigation for the narrative's structure is analysed by Goodwin as an interrogation of social divisions and the nature of power on the human spirit. He compares the third act's showdown in the unrecovered slum with the sump in Drunken Angel (1948) and the bombed out factories in The Bad Sleep Well (1960) as aspects of the environment that represent these social divisions.

Film scholar David Desser divides High and Low into three sections, describing the shift from Gondō's home, to the detectives investigating, and the kidnapper's world as "planes of action" that follow a chronology, moving from 'high' to 'low'. He notes the process of the police investigation as a thematic tension between Kurosawa's humanistic sentiment and formalistic tendencies. To Desser, "High and Low transcends its origins in formula fiction through a keen humanism." Matthew Bernstein writes on the recontextualisation of the novel as reframing the story around a moral and social critique of modern Japan. Gondō's character was changed dramatically from Hunter's novel, effectively sidelining him from the second half of the story so that he may learn the humanistic obligation the individual has to society. To Ryan and Lenos, by dividing the film's structure into segments of 'heaven' and 'hell', High and Low supports communal values over individualist ones.

Philosopher Gilles Deleuze writes in his book Cinema 1: The Movement Image (1983) that High and Low demonstrates the situation–action paradigm in its structure. To Deleuze, situation–action is a structural formula that refers to an understanding of spatial and environmental factors in the film's frame that enable characters within the story to act. In High and Low, the narrative's second half is a "senseless, brutal action" after the confined and theatrical space of its situational first half. He believes that this transition from situation to action represents an expansion of space in the film which sees the exploration and exposition of its moral themes of 'heaven and hell'; at the same time, the Kurosawan hero crosses through that expanded space laterally by taking action. The process of the situation–action paradigm in the film represents a mutual agreement across the class divide.

== Release ==
=== Theatrical ===
High and Low was released in Japan on 1 March 1963. The film was released as part of a series of commemorative films that marked Toho's thirtieth anniversary the previous year. The number of kidnappings in Japan increased slightly following the film's release. Kurosawa had intended to inspire harsher punishments by emphasising the crime's lenient sentencing, but was instead blamed for an increase in kidnapping cases. In the aftermath of the Yoshinobu-chan murder and kidnapping case in late March, Kurosawa said that because of this increase, the impact of the case took a personal toll on him. People called the Kurosawa household and threatened to kidnap the director's daughter Kazuko, then 8 or 9 years old. She was driven to and from school everyday, and forbidden from leaving the house as a precaution to prevent a potential kidnapping.

In August 1963, the film was entered into the Venice Film Festival as part of the Official Selection (placing it in competition for the festival's awards). Toho International released the film with English subtitles in the United States on 26 November 1963. Debuting in the Toho Cinema, New York, the film acquired a wider, though modest, distribution through Walter Reade–Sterling. High and Low was reissued in Japan in 1969 and 1977. The film was re-released in the United States, on new 35 mm prints in 1986, and again in 2002 as part of the "Kurosawa & Mifune" film festival. In January and February 2023, the British Film Institute (BFI) ran a Kurosawa Season, providing a platform for guest hosts (Asif Kapadia, Sonali Joshi, and Ian Haydn Smith) to discuss the major themes permeating Kurosawa's work, starting with High and Low.

=== Home media ===
A VHS version of the film was released by Home Vision Cinema, with The Criterion Collection responsible for the release of a DVD. A Blu-ray version was released on 26 July 2011; included are interviews with Tsutomu Yamazaki and Toshirō Mifune, and a 37-minute documentary detailing the film's production. In 2009, Criterion also released High and Low alongside other Kurosawa films in a box set. The BFI released a DVD of the film in 2005, with a Blu-ray version released on 27 January 2025.

== Reception ==
=== Box office ===
The film was a box office success in Japan, garnering ¥460.2 million in ticket sales (Note: Equivalent to ¥2.37 billion in 2024) and becoming the highest grossing domestic film of that year. Ticket sales during the film's opening week at the Toho Cinema in New York were dampened by the assassination of President John F. Kennedy four days prior. At the end of its eight-week run in that cinema alone, the film generated around $46,800 total in box office returns. (Note: Variety magazine reported $46,800 in ticket sales from Toho Cinema by the end of the film's run in January 1964. Equivalent to $485,826 in 2025.) Beginning in its fifth week, the penultimate week of December in 1963, it started to play in different cinemas across New York. The re-release of High and Low in 2002 as part of a multi-title film festival accrued $561,692 for all twelve films in total. (Note: Equivalent to $1,005,434 in 2025)

=== Critical response ===
==== Contemporary opinion ====
Contemporary reviews of High and Low were generally positive. Upon release in the United States, some questioned whether investigative techniques such as handwriting profiling and voiceprint analysis were possible in Japan at the time. Some critics praised the film's blocking and staging. A review in Kinema Junpo magazine praised the film's direction, proclaiming it "a masterpiece" with a rich imagination, however criticising the lack of characterisation and "organic unity" between the film's two halves. The Los Angeles Times considered it a structural departure from Kurosawa's earlier films, celebrating High and Low's camera work and social perspective. In Time magazine's review, Kurosawa's scene composition was praised, as was his ability to build suspense; yet the review criticised the film's pacing after the kidnapper's identity is discovered, further referring to the story as "hackneyed, and at times implausible".

At the Venice Film Festival, a negative review in Cahiers du Cinéma dismissed the film's modern context and its "metaphysics and morality [...] taking precedence over suspense". It further criticised the film for police apologia and having sympathy for its rich protagonist but considered the train sequence to be beautiful. Sight and Sound, viewing the film at Venice, dismissed it as "turgid and disappointing". Upon release in the UK, a 1967 review in the magazine by Robert Vas singled out High and Low's structure as particularly inspired. Vas commended the film's technical elements, including the lighting and acting, but he criticised the film's ending as an uncomplicated message delivered by obvious metaphors. Writing for the Kenyon Review in 1965, Charles Higham praised the film's geometric design before analysing the film's third act as a humanistic exposure of modern Japan.

Most American reviewers responded positively to High and Low's formal style, but did not think the source material was worthy of the art. In The New Republic, Stanley Kauffmann lauded the film's technical elements but questioned why Kurosawa made the film, believing it retained a facile sense of the moral conflict found in the detective fiction of Hunter's novel. Judith Crist of the New York Herald Tribune praised Kurosawa's creation of suspense and the expansion of the novel's moral conflict, but she did not consider it one of the ten best films of the year. Howard Thompson of The New York Times considered the film to be an outstanding achievement among detective films, going on to commend the execution of the ransom-exchange sequence on the train and the performances of Mifune and Nakadai. Upon viewing the film, the critic Tadao Satō considered it, along with other works of Kurosawa's made after I Live in Fear (1955), to be drained of thematic and sentimental meaning. He thought the characters acted irrationally, particularly concerning the motivation of Yamazaki's kidnapper.

==== Retrospective opinion ====
On the review aggregator website Rotten Tomatoes, High and Low has an approval rating of 97% based on 70 critic reviews; those with a score formed an average of 8.3/10. In a 1988 special edition of Kinema Junpo magazine, a poll of readers and 39 critics ranked the film the second best film of 1963, behind only The Insect Woman. Tsutomu Yamazaki, viewing the film nearly 30 years after its release at the Sydney Film Festival, still considered the film "fresh and interesting", but criticised his performance as substandard. Meanwhile, Yutaka Sada considered his own performance to be his best work in all of Kurosawa's films. The filmmaker Takashi Miike recalled feeling a kinship with the film, including an obsession with its final scene. Director Martin Scorsese included it on a list of "39 Essential Foreign Films for a Young Filmmaker" in 2014, and on the list of his 84 favorite films in 2024. In a GQ interview published in June 2025, video game designer Hideo Kojima named it as one of his four favorite films, though he noted his preferences shift over time.

Shortly before the 1986 American re-release of High and Low, Paul Attanasio, writing in The Washington Post, noted that it did not count among Kurosawa's masterpieces, but favourably compared the film's plot and symbolism with William Shakespeare's plays and connected the film with Throne of Blood (1957), Kurosawa's adaptation of Shakespeare's Macbeth, saying that High and Low is "Macbeth, if Macbeth had married better." In 1998 the film journalist Masaaki Tsuzuki referred to the film as "the great fruit and one of the last moments" of Kurosawa's humanism. David Parkinson, writing for Empire in 2006, gave it four out of five stars, commenting on the film's use of obscured comparison between social classes to illustrate that the equality between men is separated by the choices they make when faced with a crisis. Scott Tobias wrote for The A.V. Club in 2008 that the film's divided structure heightened its realism to create a powerful sense of suspense. Writing for The Guardian in 2025, Peter Bradshaw rated High and Low five stars out of five. He praised the film's storytelling and moral dilemma, referring to Gondō as "the ultimate capitalist ... [who finds] it isn't at all clear if he thinks his compromised moral heroism and sacrifice has been worth it."

=== Awards ===
Award	Date of ceremony	Category	Recipient(s)	Result	Ref.
Mainichi Film Awards	1963	Best Film	High and Low	Won	
Mainichi Film Awards	1963	Best Screenplay	Akira Kurosawa, Hideo Oguni, Eijirō Hisaita, Ryūzō Kikushima	Won	
Venice International Film Festival	7 September 1963	Golden Lion	High and Low	Nominated	
Edgar Awards	1964	Best Foreign Film	High and Low	Nominated	
Golden Globe Awards	11 March 1964	Foreign Film – Foreign Language	High and Low	Nominated	

== Legacy ==
Although historically receiving comparatively less acclaim than his 1950s output, High and Low is sometimes cited as one of Kurosawa's greatest works. The film scholar Audie Bock appraised the film as the last of Kurosawa's great humanitarian dramas, believing his subsequent films to be too sanctimonious, containing a different moral sense. It has been compared to Kurosawa's earlier police procedural Stray Dog (1949), marked by similar moral and social themes in an unfolding crime investigation set during the summer. The film has been viewed as influential on the genre of police procedurals, including the films of Bong Joon Ho and David Fincher. The South Korean film Parasite (2019), directed and co-written by Bong, has a similar premise to Kurosawa's film: a family living in an expensive house on a hill are unknowingly shadowed by criminals living in the poorer, lower part of the city. Bong affirmed these similarities between High and Low and Parasite's framing of the class difference in discussing the design of his characters' houses. The final prison sequence also inspired the set design for the asylum in Matt Reeves's The Batman (2022).

The Indian film Inkaar (1977) is an unauthorised Hindi-language remake. The rights to remake Kurosawa's film were acquired by Universal in 1993, and Martin Scorsese was set to direct a script written by David Mamet, but the project lingered in development purgatory; an attempt to revive it in 2001 with Scorsese as co-producer also failed to materialise. In 2007, the film was adapted into a J-drama by Yasuo Tsuruhashi for TV Asahi. The plot of the miniseries Full Circle (2023) was inspired by High and Low. A reinterpretation of the film directed by Spike Lee, titled Highest 2 Lowest, was released in 2025.

== See also ==
- List of works by Akira Kurosawa
- Social mystery – A subgenre of mystery fiction in Japan that emerged in the 1950s–60s, focusing on social issues and institutional critique
