= Asō Domain =

Feudal domain in Edo period Japan

Asō Domain 麻生藩
- under Tokugawa shogunate Japan
- 1604–1871
- Capital: Asō jin'ya
  - Type: Daimyō
- Historical era: Edo period
  - Established: 1604
  - Disestablished: 1871
- Today part of: part of Ibaraki Prefecture

Asō Domain (麻生藩, Asō-han) was a feudal domain under the Tokugawa shogunate of Edo period Japan, located in Hitachi Province (modern-day Ibaraki Prefecture), Japan. It was centered on Asō Jin'ya in what is now the city of Namegata, Ibaraki. It was ruled for all of its history by the Shinjō clan.

== History ==
Shinjō Naoyori, a retainer of Toyotomi Hideyoshi and lord of Takatsuki Domain in Settsu Province sided with the losing western forces in the Battle of Sekigahara in 1601, and was deprived of his lands. However, in 1604, after pledging his fealty to Tokugawa Ieyasu, he was restored to a 33,000 koku holding spanning eight districts of Hitachi and Shimotsuke Provinces, centered at Asō.

His son, Shinjō Naosada, divided the domain by giving 3000 koku to his younger brother Naofusa. The 5th daimyō, Shinjō Naonori succeeded as an infant, and the domain continued to be run by his retired father, the 4th daimyō Shinjō Naotoki, who had established himself at a subsidiary 7000 koku holding in Kashima District. However, when Shinjō Naonori died at age 17 without an heir, the domain was suppressed by the Tokugawa shogunate. Shinjō Naotoki successfully petitioned the Shōgun for its restoration later the same year, but was given only 3000 koku of hatamoto lands to add to his existing 7000 koku.

During the Boshin War, the domain assisted in the suppression of the Mito Rebellion. The site of Asō Jin'ya is now occupied by Asō Elementary School, and the house of the karō of Asō Domain has been preserved as a museum.

The domain had a population of 6043 people in 1389 households per a census in 1838.

== Holdings at the end of the Edo period ==
As with most domains in the han system, Asō Domain consisted of several discontinuous territories calculated to provide the assigned kokudaka, based on periodic cadastral surveys and projected agricultural yields.

- Hitachi Province
  - 4 villages in Ibaraki District
  - 19 villages in Namegata District

== List of daimyō ==
#	Name	Tenure	Courtesy title	Court Rank	kokudaka
Shinjō clan (Tozama) 1604-1871
1	Shinjō Naoyori (新庄直頼)	1604–1612	Suruga-no-kami (駿河守)	Lower 5th (従五位下)	33,000 koku
2	Shinjō Naosada (新庄直定)	1612–1618	Echizen-no-kami (越前守)	Lower 5th (従五位下)	30,000 koku
3	Shinjō Naoyoshi (新庄直好)	1618–1662	Echizen-no-kami (越前守)	Lower 5th (従五位下)	30,000 koku
4	Shinjō Naotoki (新庄直時)	1662–1674	Oki-no-kami (隠岐守)	Lower 5th (従五位下)	30,000 koku
5	Shinjō Naonori (新庄直矩)	1674–1676	--none--	--none--	23,000 koku
6	Shinjō Naotoki (新庄直時)	1676–1677	Oki-no-kami (隠岐守)	Lower 5th (従五位下)	10,000 koku
7	Shinjō Naonori (新庄直詮)	1677–1708	Tonomo-no-kami (主殿頭)	Lower 5th (従五位下)	10,000 koku
8	Shinjō Naosuke (新庄直祐)	1708–1735	Suruga-no-kami (駿河守)	Upper 5th (従五位上)	10,000 koku
9	Shinjō Naotaka (新庄直隆)	1735–1755	Etchu-no-kami (越中守)	Lower 5th (従五位下)	10,000 koku
10	Shinjō Naoyoshi (新庄直侯)	1755–1772	Echizen-no-kami (越前守)	Lower 5th (従五位下)	10,000 koku
11	Shinjō Naonori (新庄直規)	1772–1803	Suruga-no-kami (駿河守)	Lower 5th (従五位下)	10,000 koku
12	Shinjō Naokazu (新庄直計)	1803–1845	Tonomo-no-kami (主殿頭)	Lower 5th (従五位下)	10,000 koku
13	Shinjō Naotora (新庄直彪)	1845–1865	Suruga-no-kami (駿河守)	Lower 5th (従五位下)	10,000 koku
14	Shinjō Naohatsu (新庄 直𩑛)	1866–1867	--none--	--none--	10,000 koku
15	Shinjō Naotaka (新庄直敬)	1867–1871	Shimotsuke-no-kami (下野守)	Lower 5th (従五位下)	10,000 koku
