= Asō =

Town in Ibaraki Prefecture, Japan

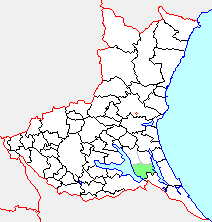
Map of Asō, Ibaraki

Asō (麻生町, Asō-machi) was a town located in Namegata District, Ibaraki Prefecture, Japan. It is now a part of the city of Namegata.

As of 2003, the town had an estimated population of 16,221 and a density of 268.65 persons per km^{2}. The total area was 60.38 km^{2}.

On September 2, 2005, Asō, along with the towns of Kitaura and Tamatsukuri (all from Namegata District), were merged to create the city of Namegata and it ceases as an independent municipality.
