= The Bricklayer =

Film by Renny Harlin

- Release poster
- Directed by: Renny Harlin
- Screenplay by: Hanna Weg; Matt Johnson
- Based on: The Bricklayer by Paul Lindsay
- Produced by: Jeffrey Greenstein; Yariv Lerner; Jonathan Yunger; Heidi Jo Markel; Robert Van Norden
- Starring: Aaron Eckhart; Nina Dobrev; Tim Blake Nelson; Ilfenesh Hadera; Clifton Collins Jr.
- Cinematography: Matti Eerikäinen
- Edited by: Iain Erskine
- Music by: Walter Mair
- Production companies: Millennium Media; Eclectic Pictures
- Distributed by: Vertical Entertainment
- Release dates: December 14, 2023 (New Zealand & Australia); January 5, 2024 (United States)
- Running time: 110 minutes
- Country: United States
- Language: English
- Box office: $899,683

The Bricklayer is a 2023 American action thriller film directed by Renny Harlin and written by Hanna Weg and Matt Johnson, based on the 2010 novel of the same name by Paul Lindsay under his pen name Noah Boyd, and starring Aaron Eckhart, Nina Dobrev, Tim Blake Nelson, Ilfenesh Hadera and Clifton Collins Jr.

The film was released on December 14, 2023 in New Zealand and Australia. It was later released on January 5, 2024 in the United States by Vertical Entertainment.

== Plot ==
Steve Vail, a former CIA field agent, is working as a bricklayer when the CIA recruits him to track down the killer of three international journalists who have been murdered within a month, including Greta Becker, an outspoken critic of U.S. intelligence activities across the world, where the CIA is being framed as being responsible. Kate Bannon, a junior CIA agent assigned to the case, and CIA Director O'Malley meet and inform him that Victor Radek, a former operative and friend of Steve who was believed to be dead, was responsible for the murders, believing that he wants revenge against the agency for leaving him to die after a botched mission and the death of his family. Vail refuses due to Kate's inexperience. One night, Vail is attacked by Radek's men, but he kills them.

Steve heads for Greece with Kate, and Steve meets his old friend Patricio and ditches Kate at the hotel in Thessaloniki to meet with his former lover and undercover agent, Tye Delson. She tells him that former informant-turned-gangster Denis "Sten" Stefanopoulos might have information about Radek. At a pool party, Steve confronts Sten and fights with his security before Kate arrives to help him escape, following him through a tracker she planted on him. Steve had already placed her tracker on Sten so he would lead them to Radek. Kate questions Steve about Radek and he reveals that Radek was working undercover for the Russian and Greek mafia and that the CIA would provide asylum for his family. However, his cover was blown, and the mafia killed his family. Radek went rogue and killed the mafia, forcing the agency to send Steve to kill Radek. They follow the tracker to Sten's residence, where Steve discovers hidden documents in a brick wall, and Kate finds Becker's phone. Sten's assistant enters the house and fights Steve. Kate hesitates, failing to shoot the man before Steve kills him.

Patricio decrypts the phone, and they learn that Radek's next target is Alekos Melas, a critic of U.S. intelligence. Steve suddenly receives a call from Radek and tells him that the agency blew his cover because he couldn't complete one of their assignments: to assassinate a Greek politician, so he's blackmailing them for revenge. Radek kills Alekos and escapes from the team. Steve visits Tye, who reveals that she knew of Radek before Steve came to her. He and Kate find Patricio dead after Radek tortured him. Sten and his henchmen arrive to kill Steve and Kate after being ordered by Radek, but they use a bomb strapped to Patricio's dead body as a booby-trap, killing Sten and the rest of the henchmen.

Steve and Kate return to the U.S. to meet O'Malley, who tells him that Radek threatened to leak the agency's covert activities worldwide unless they paid him $100 million. O'Malley removes Steve from the mission after the difficulties he has caused with local police and sends Kate to deliver the ransom, but Steve takes over Kate's place and delivers the money to Radek in a computer in a basement. When the transfer was complete, Radek makes a video call to Steve, knowing he would be the one to deliver the money. He blames Steve for failing to protect his family despite faking his death before and plans to assassinate the Greek prime minister Kostas Leontaris, putting the blame on the agency before rigging a bomb. Steve escapes the blast, and he and Kate pursue Radek to public speaking of Kostas. Steve uses a sledgehammer to knock the platform, causing Radek to miss. Steve apologizes to Radek, who provokes Steve into killing him.

After being hospitalized, O’Malley comes to cover for Steve, and Radek's manifestos are recovered before the authorities can see them, but the money is never recovered. Steve deduces that Tye was the real culprit who had been helping Radek leak the agency's activities and stole the ransom money. Tye's men arrive to kill Steve, but he manages to kill all of them with a bomb. Tye attempts to kill Steve, but Kate arrives and shoots Tye, causing her to crash and kill her. Afterward, Kate resigns from the agency, and Steve returns to his bricklayer job.

== Cast ==
- Aaron Eckhart as Vail, a former CIA operative and bricklayer
- Nina Dobrev as Kate, a junior CIA agent working with Vail
- Clifton Collins Jr. as Radek, a former operative and friend of Vail
- Tim Blake Nelson as O'Malley, the Director of the CIA
- Ilfenesh Hadera as Tye, CIA Thessaloniki Station Chief
- Ori Pfeffer as Sten

== Production ==
The film was announced in August 2011, with Gerard Butler set to star and produce. In January 2022, it was announced that Aaron Eckhart would replace Butler as the lead Steve Vail. In February 2022, it was announced that Nina Dobrev joined the cast. Later that same month, it was announced that Tim Blake Nelson and Clifton Collins Jr. joined the cast. In May 2022, it was reported that Ilfenesh Hadera was also cast. Principal photography began in Thessaloniki, Greece, in March 2022. Filming took place at Nu Boyana Film Studios in Bulgaria and Greece.

== Release ==
In May 2022, it was reported that Screen Media acquired the North American distribution rights to the film. In October 2023 it was reported that Vertical Entertainment had picked up the rights and set a January 5, 2024 day-and-date release in the United States.

=== Critical reception ===
On the review aggregator website Rotten Tomatoes, 48% of 23 critics' reviews are positive, with an average rating of 5.2/10. Dennis Harvey of Variety wrote: "There may be nothing memorable enough here to stir great enthusiasm for another Steve Vail outing, given basic genre components sufficiently generic to seem more MacGruber than 007. But while you're watching, Harlin and company provide a fun ride".
