= Man in the Storm =

1952 film

- Directed by: Kiyoshi Saeki
- Written by: Toshio Yasumi
- Starring: Kyōko Kagawa
- Cinematography: Minoru Yokoyama
- Distributed by: Toei Company
- Release date: 7 February 1952
- Country: Japan
- Language: Japanese

Man in the Storm (嵐の中の母, Arashi no Naka no Haha; Mother in the Storm) is a 1952 Japanese film directed by Kiyoshi Saeki. It was entered into the 1952 Cannes Film Festival.

== Cast ==
- Kyōko Kagawa (as K. Kagawa)
- Yaeko Mizutani (as Y. Mizutani)
- Yōichi Numata (as Y. Numata)
