= King's Ransom (novel) =

1959 novel by Ed McBain (Evan Hunter)

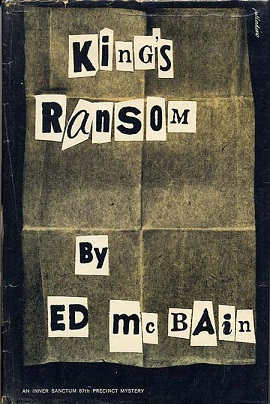
First edition (publ. Simon & Schuster)

King's Ransom: An 87th Precinct Mystery is a novel by Ed McBain (Evan Hunter) published in 1959, part of his 87th Precinct series of police procedural novels and short stories. It centers on the moral dilemma faced by a wealthy man when he is forced to choose between using his wealth to fulfill a personal ambition or saving the life of a kidnapped child.

== Adaptations ==
- "King's Ransom", episode 21 of the American television series 87th Precinct, is based on the novel. It was broadcast February 19, 1962.
- The 1963 Japanese film High and Low, directed by Akira Kurosawa, is loosely based on the novel.
- Full Circle is an American mystery drama miniseries inspired by Kurosawa's High and Low. Created and written by Ed Solomon and directed by Steven Soderbergh for the Max streaming television service, it premiered July 13, 2023.
- Highest 2 Lowest, a remake of the Kurosawa film, was released on August 15, 2025, after debuting at the Cannes Film Festival in May 2025. It was directed by Spike Lee and features Denzel Washington in the lead role.

== See also ==
- Evan Hunter bibliography
