= Ilfenesh Hadera =

American actress

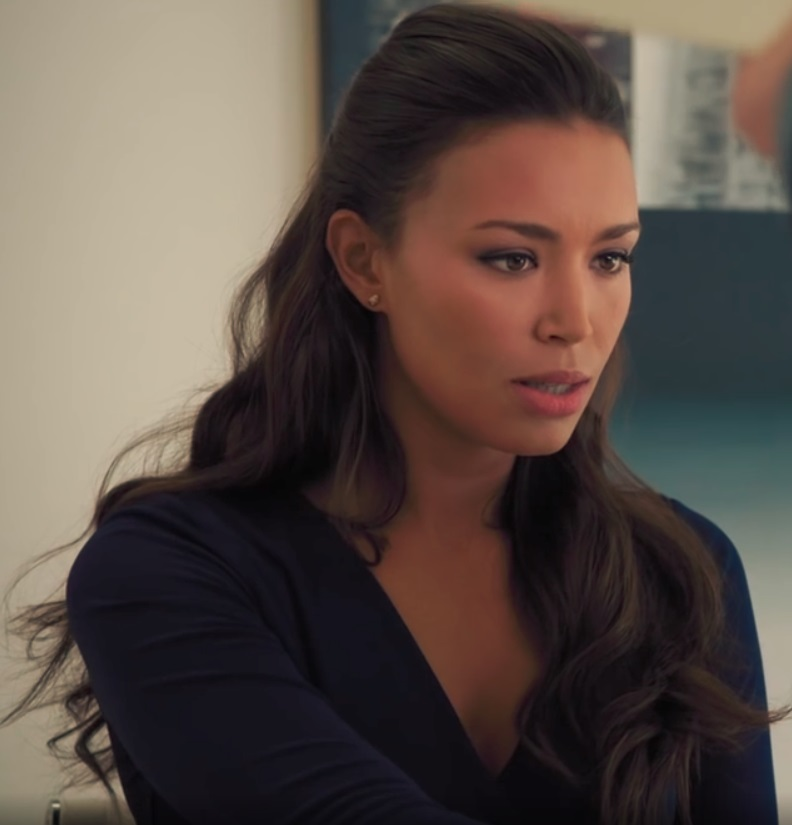
- Hadera on Billions in 2017
- Education: RADA/King's College London (MFA)
- Occupation: Actress
- Years active: 2010–present

Ilfenesh Hadera is an American actress. Hadera has been a frequent collaborator of director Spike Lee, appearing in Oldboy (2013), Chi-Raq (2015), She's Gotta Have It (2018-2019) and Highest 2 Lowest (2025).

== Early life ==
Hadera was raised in Harlem, New York. She identifies as half Ethiopian and half white. Her father, Asfaha Hadera, an Ethiopian refugee of Tigrayan descent, is the founder of the African Services Committee (ASC), a Harlem-based organization that works with African refugees. Her mother, Kim Nichols, has served as co-director of ASC since 1984. She volunteered with the organization prior to beginning her acting career.

Hadera attended The Harlem School of the Arts, followed by the Fiorello H. LaGuardia High School. She went on to receive an MFA in text and performance studies from RADA/King's College London.

== Career ==
In 2010, Hadera made her acting debut in the film 1/20.

A frequent collaborator with Spike Lee, she has appeared in Oldboy, Chi-Raq, She's Gotta Have It and Highest 2 Lowest. She's also appeared in The Bricklayer, The Blacklist, Show Me a Hero, Chicago Fire, and The Punisher.

Hadera co-starred as Stephanie Holden in the 2017 film Baywatch, and in 2018 starred as Kay Daniels in the TV series Deception. She had a recurring role in the Showtime series Billions, as a secretary to billionaire fund manager Bobby Axelrod, played by Damian Lewis.

On September 29, 2019, Hadera began starring as Mayme Johnson, the wife of Bumpy Johnson in the premiere of the American crime drama television series, Godfather of Harlem on Epix. In 2025, she played Pam King in Highest 2 Lowest.

== Filmography ==
=== Film ===
Year	Title	Role	Notes
2010	1/20	Hazel	
2013	Oldboy	Judy	
2015	Chi-Raq	Ms. McCloud	
2017	Baywatch	Stephanie Holden	
2024	The Bricklayer	Tye	
2024	Werewolves	Lucy Marshall	
2025	Highest 2 Lowest	Pam King	

=== Television ===
Year	Title	Role	Notes
2011	Da Brick	Saalinge	TV movie
2013	The Blacklist	Jennifer Palmer	Episode: "Pilot"
2015	Show Me a Hero	Carmen Febles	Main cast
2015	Chicago Fire	Serena Holmes	Recurring role (season 4)
2016	Difficult People	Abby	Episode: "Patches"
2016	Conviction	Naomi Golden	Recurring role
2016–17	Billions	Deb Kawi	Recurring role (seasons 1-2)
2017	Master of None	Lisa	Recurring role (season 2)
2017	The Punisher	Mistress	Episode: "Crosshairs"
2017–19	She's Gotta Have It	Opal Gilstrap	Recurring role
2018	Deception	Kay Daniels	Main cast
2019–2025	Godfather of Harlem	Mayme Johnson	Main cast
2021	Run the World	Herself	Episode: "What a Co-inky-dick"
2021–22	Blue Bloods	Det. Angela Reddick	2 episodes
2023	East New York	A.D.A. Vonny Diskant	Episode: "In the Bag"
2023–24	The Equalizer	Michelle Chambers	2 episodes
2026	Will Trent	Joanne Drexler	2 episodes
