= Namegata =

Namegata 行方市
- City
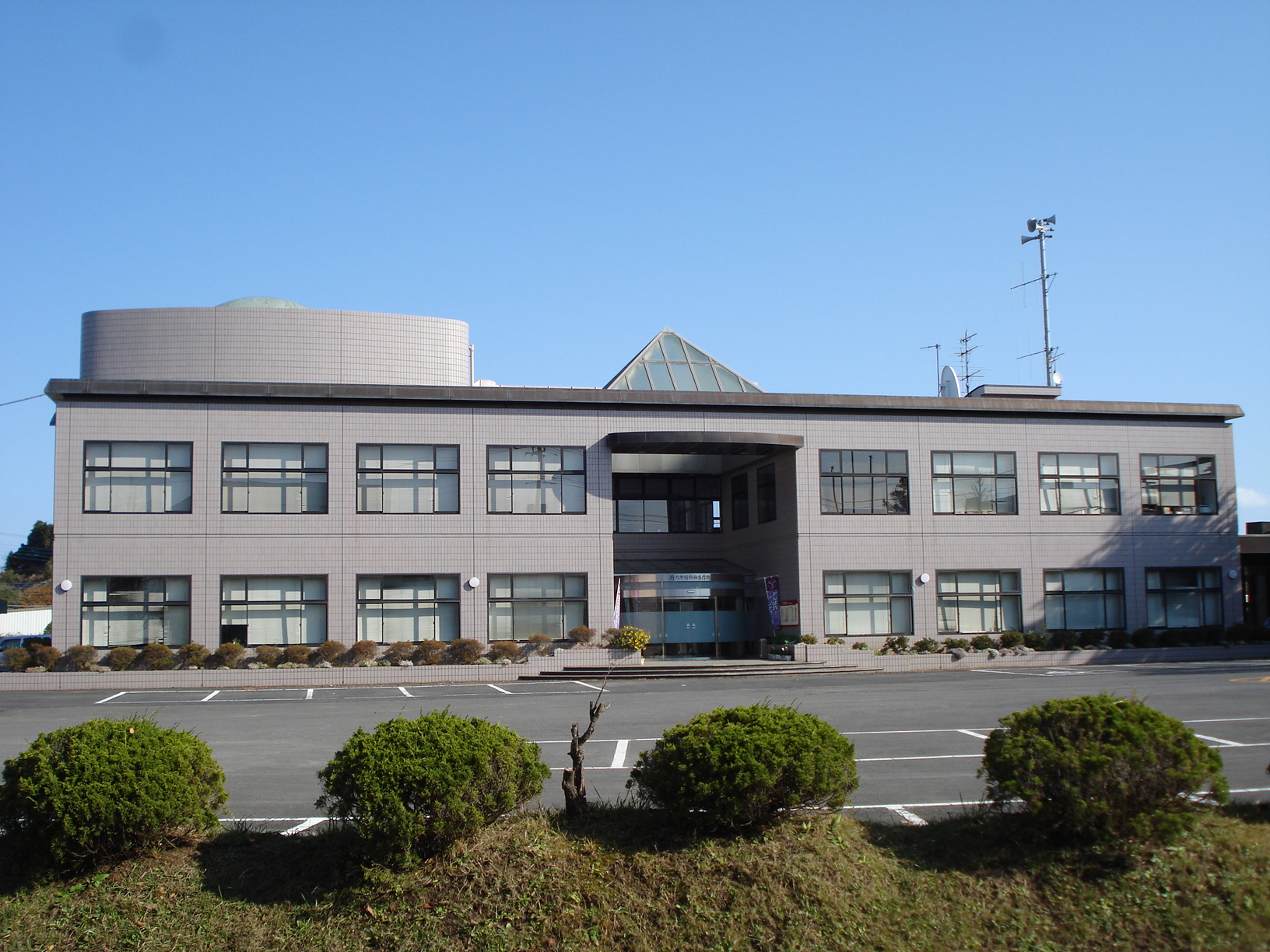
- Namegata city hall

- Flag Seal

- Location of Namegata in Ibaraki Prefecture

- Coordinates: 35°59′25.8″N 140°29′20.5″E
- Country: Japan
- Region: Kantō
- Prefecture: Ibaraki

Area
  - Total: 222.48 km^{2} (85.90 sq mi)

Population (September 2015)
  - Total: 31,960
  - Density: 143.7/km^{2} (372.1/sq mi)
- Time zone: UTC+9 (Japan Standard Time)
- Tree: Ginkgo biloba
- Flower: Lilium auratum
- Bird: Egret
- Phone number: 0299-72-0811
- Address: Aso 1561-9, Namegat-shi, Ibaraki-ken 311-3892
- Website: Official website

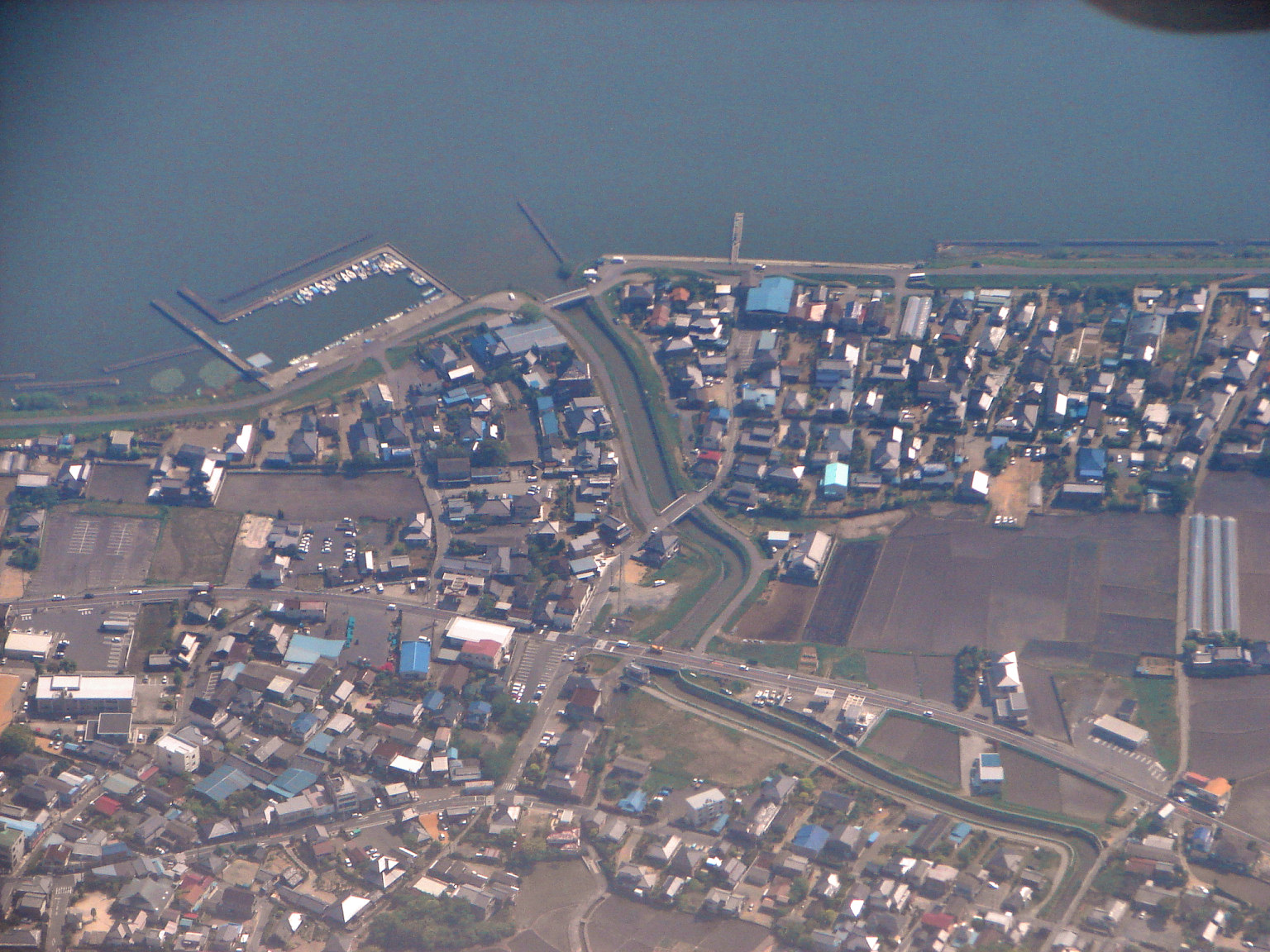
Aerial view of marina on Lake Kasumigaura in Namegata

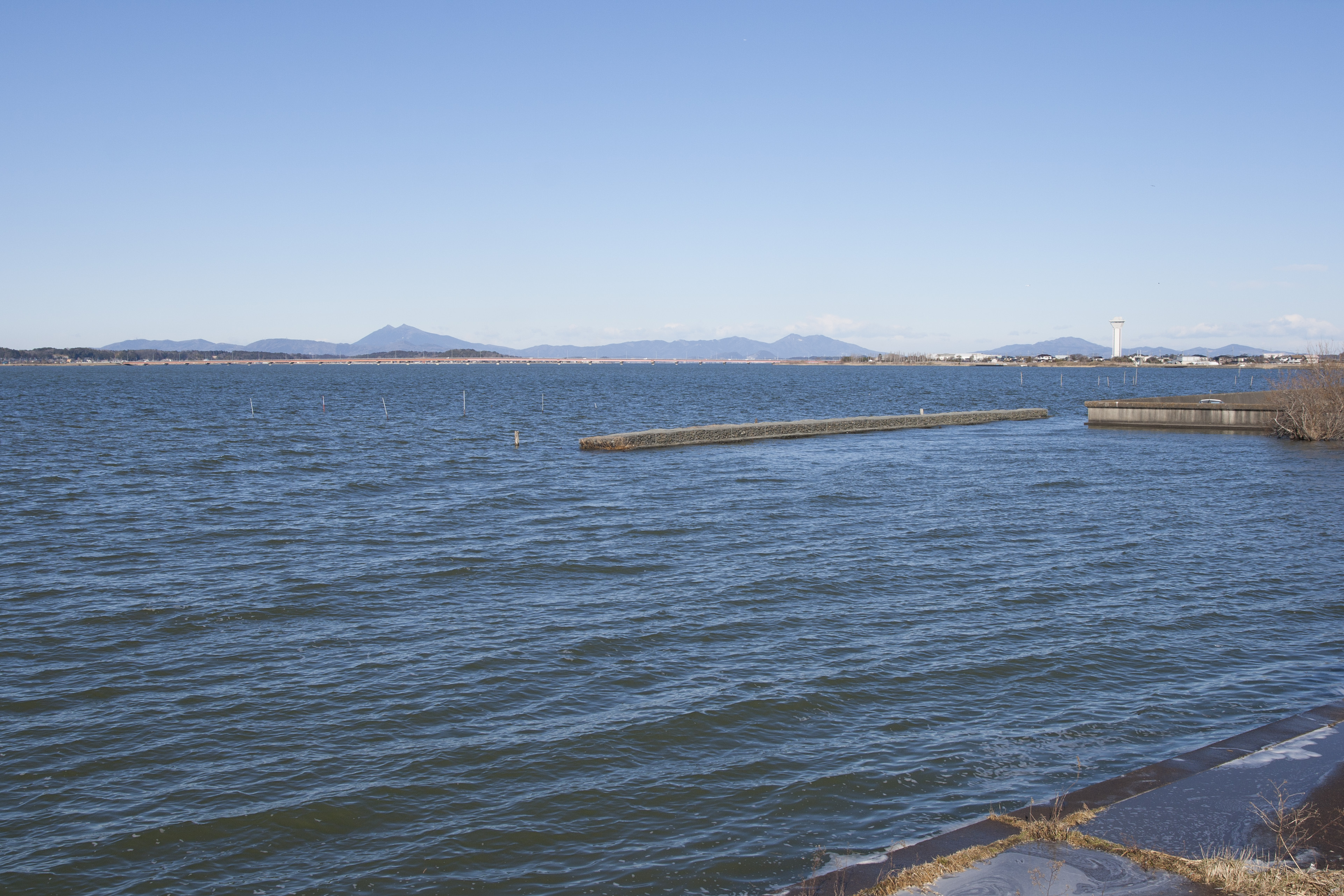
Lake Kasumigaura from Namegata

Namegata (行方市, Namegata-shi) is a city in Ibaraki Prefecture, Japan. As of 1 July 2020, the city had an estimated population of 32,144 in 11,412 households and a population density of 144.5 persons per km^{2}. The percentage of the population aged over 65 was 35.9%. The city's total area is 222.48 square kilometres (85.90 sq mi).

== Geography ==
Namegata is in south-central Ibaraki Prefecture, bordered by Lake Kasumigaura to the east and Lake Kitaura to the west. It is about 70 kilometers from central Tokyo and about 40 kilometers from the prefectural capital at Mito.

=== Surrounding municipalities ===
Ibaraki Prefecture

- Itako
- Hokota
- Kashima
- Kasumigaura
- Omitama

=== Climate ===
Namegata has a humid subtropical climate (Köppen Cfa) characterized by warm summers and cool winters with light snowfall. The average annual temperature in Namegata is 14.1 °C. The average annual rainfall is 1410 mm, with September being the wettest month. The temperatures are highest on average in August, at around 25.8 °C, and lowest in January, at around 3.4 °C.

== Demographics ==
Per Japanese census data, the population of Namegata has declined over the past 40 years.

Historical population
Year	Pop.	±%
1920	33,789	—
1930	35,996	+6.5%
1940	38,680	+7.5%
1950	49,391	+27.7%
1960	47,549	−3.7%
1970	42,589	−10.4%
1980	42,660	+0.2%
1990	42,990	+0.8%
2000	41,465	−3.5%
2010	37,611	−9.3%
2020	32,185	−14.4%

== History ==
During the Edo period, portions of what later became the city of Namegata were controlled by the Asō Domain, a feudal domain under the Tokugawa shogunate. The towns of Asō and Tamazukuri were created by establishing the modern municipalities system on April 1, 1889. The village of Kitaura was established on April 1, 1955, and elevated to town status on October 1, 1997. The three towns merged to form the city of Namegata on September 2, 2005.

== Government ==
Namegata has a mayor-council form of government with a directly elected mayor and a unicameral city council of 18 members. Namegata contributes one member to the Ibaraki Prefectural Assembly. Regarding national politics, the city is part of Ibaraki 2nd district of the lower house of the Diet of Japan.

== Economy ==
The economy of Namegata is primarily agriculture, with aquaculture on Lake Kasumigaura taking a predominant role.

== Education ==
Namegata has 16 public elementary schools, four public middle schools operated by the city government, and two public high schools operated by the Ibaraki Prefectural Board of Education.

== Transportation ==
=== Railway ===
- Namegata does not have any commercial passenger rail service.

=== Highway ===
- National Route 354
- National Route 355

== Local attractions ==
Namegata has many attractions, including:

- Hitachi Seaside Park
- Kasumigaura Fureai Land
- Namegata Farmers Village
- Sairen-ji Temple

== Noted people from Namegata ==
- Kyōko Kagawa, actress
- Hiromi Nagasaku, actress, singer
- Fukushiro Nukaga, politician
- Hideaki Ozawa, football player
- Mitsuo Yanagimachi, screenwriter and film director
