= 1967 European Formula Two Championship =

Seasons
- ← none 1968 →

The 1967 European Formula Two season was the 1st FIA European Formula Two Championship. It commenced on 24 March 1967 and ended on 8 October after ten races. Jacky Ickx won the Championship after winning the last race in Vallelunga, but the most successful driver of the season was Jochen Rindt, who won five Championship races but, as a graded driver, he was ineligible to earn points, so Ickx won the Championship. Other graded drivers, like Jim Clark and Jackie Stewart, also each won races.

== Teams and drivers ==
Entrant	Constructor	Chassis	Engine	Tyre	Driver	Rounds
(United Kingdom) Motor Racing Developments	Brabham-Ford	BT23; BT23C	Ford Cosworth FVA 1.6 L4	G	(Australia) Jack Brabham	1, 3, 5-6, 9
(United Kingdom) Motor Racing Developments	Brabham-Ford	BT23; BT23C	Ford Cosworth FVA 1.6 L4	G	(New Zealand) Denny Hulme	1-2
(United Kingdom) Motor Racing Developments	Brabham-Ford	BT23; BT23C	Ford Cosworth FVA 1.6 L4	G	(Australia) Frank Gardner	1-5, 7-10
(United Kingdom) Roy Winkelmann Racing (Netherlands) Racing Team Holland	Brabham-Ford	BT23	Ford Cosworth FVA 1.6 L4	G F	(Austria) Jochen Rindt	1–3, 5-6, 9
(United Kingdom) Roy Winkelmann Racing (Netherlands) Racing Team Holland	Brabham-Ford	BT23	Ford Cosworth FVA 1.6 L4	G F	(United Kingdom) Alan Rees	1-3, 5, 7-10
(United Kingdom) Roy Winkelmann Racing (Netherlands) Racing Team Holland	Brabham-Ford	BT23	Ford Cosworth FVA 1.6 L4	G F	(Netherlands) Gijs van Lennep	7
(United Kingdom) Team Lotus (United Kingdom) Lotus Components Ltd (United Kingdom) Herts Aero Club	Lotus-Ford	48; 41B	Ford Cosworth FVA 1.6 L4	F	(United Kingdom) Graham Hill	1-3, 5-6, 8-10
(United Kingdom) Team Lotus (United Kingdom) Lotus Components Ltd (United Kingdom) Herts Aero Club	Lotus-Ford	48; 41B	Ford Cosworth FVA 1.6 L4	F	(United Kingdom) Jackie Oliver	1, 3, 5-6, 8-10
(United Kingdom) Team Lotus (United Kingdom) Lotus Components Ltd (United Kingdom) Herts Aero Club	Lotus-Ford	48; 41B	Ford Cosworth FVA 1.6 L4	F	(United Kingdom) Jim Clark	3, 5-6, 8
(United Kingdom) Team Lotus (United Kingdom) Lotus Components Ltd (United Kingdom) Herts Aero Club	Lotus-Ford	48; 41B	Ford Cosworth FVA 1.6 L4	F	(Mexico) Moisés Solana	6
(United Kingdom) Bruce McLaren Motor Racing	McLaren-Ford	M4A	Ford Cosworth FVA 1.6 L4	F	(New Zealand) Bruce McLaren	1–3
(United Kingdom) Tyrrell Racing Organisation	Matra-Ford	MS5; MS7	Ford Cosworth FVA 1.6 L4	D	(United Kingdom) Jackie Stewart	1-2, 6, 8-9
(United Kingdom) Tyrrell Racing Organisation	Matra-Ford	MS5; MS7	Ford Cosworth FVA 1.6 L4	D	(Belgium) Jacky Ickx	1-5, 7-10
(United Kingdom) Tyrrell Racing Organisation	Matra-Ford	MS5; MS7	Ford Cosworth FVA 1.6 L4	D	(France) Jean-Pierre Jaussaud	6, 10
(United Kingdom) Lola Racing Ltd	Lola-Ford	T100	Ford Cosworth FVA 1.6 L4	F	(United Kingdom) John Surtees	1-2, 9
(United Kingdom) Lola Racing Ltd	Lola-Ford	T100	Ford Cosworth FVA 1.6 L4	F	(United Kingdom) Chris Irwin	3-8
(United Kingdom) Lola Racing Ltd	Lola-Ford	T100	Ford Cosworth FVA 1.6 L4	F	(Italy) Andrea de Adamich	8
(United Kingdom) Lola Racing Ltd	Lola-BMW	T100	BMW M11 1.6 L4	F	(United Kingdom) Chris Irwin	1, 9
(United Kingdom) Lola Racing Ltd	Lola-BMW	T100	BMW M11 1.6 L4	F	(United Kingdom) John Surtees	3
(United Kingdom) Witley Racing Syndicate	Brabham-Ford	BT23	Ford Cosworth FVA 1.6 L4	F	(United Kingdom) Robin Widdows	1-5, 7, 9-10
(United Kingdom) McKechnie Racing Organisation	Brabham-Ford	BT21/23; BT21	Ford Cosworth FVA 1.6 L4	F	(United Kingdom) Chris Lambert	1–2, 10
(United Kingdom) Andrew Fletcher	Brabham-Lotus	BT18	Lotus LF 1.6 L4	?	(United Kingdom) Andrew Fletcher	1, 9-10
(United Kingdom) Andrew Fletcher	Brabham-Lotus	BT18	Lotus LF 1.6 L4	?	(United Kingdom) Jimmy Veitch	2
(United Kingdom) Ian Raby Racing	Brabham-Lotus	BT14; BT18	Lotus LF 1.6 L4	?	(United Kingdom) Ian Raby	1-7
(United Kingdom) Ian Raby Racing	Brabham-Lotus	BT14; BT18	Lotus LF 1.6 L4	?	(United Kingdom) Andrew Fletcher	4, 7
(United Kingdom) Frank Manning Racing	Lola-Lotus	T64	Lotus LF 1.6 L4	?	(United Kingdom) Robert Lamplough	1-2, 4, 6-7, 9
(United Kingdom) Frank Manning Racing	Lola-Lotus	T64	Lotus LF 1.6 L4	?	(Spain) Paco Godia	6
(United Kingdom) Frank Manning Racing	Brabham-Lotus	BT21A	Lotus LF 1.6 L4	?	(United Kingdom) Mike Walker	9
(United Kingdom) Frank Manning Racing	Brabham-Lotus	BT21A	Lotus LF 1.6 L4	?	(United Kingdom) Robert Lamplough	10
(France) Matra Sports	Matra-Ford	MS5; MS7	Ford Cosworth FVA 1.6 L4	?	(France) Jean-Pierre Beltoise	1-3, 5-10
(France) Matra Sports	Matra-Ford	MS5; MS7	Ford Cosworth FVA 1.6 L4	?	(France) Johnny Servoz-Gavin	3, 5-8, 10
(France) Matra Sports	Matra-Ford	MS5; MS7	Ford Cosworth FVA 1.6 L4	?	(France) Henri Pescarolo	9
(West Germany) BMW	Lola-BMW	T100	BMW M11 1.6 L4	D	(West Germany) Hubert Hahne	1, 3, 5-6, 8-10
(West Germany) BMW	Lola-BMW	T100	BMW M11 1.6 L4	D	(Switzerland) Jo Siffert	2-3, 10
(United Kingdom) John Coombs	McLaren-Ford	M4A	Ford Cosworth FVA 1.6 L4	D F	(United Kingdom) Piers Courage	All
(United Kingdom) Bob Gerard (United Kingdom) Cooper Racing	Cooper-Ford	T84; T82	Ford Cosworth FVA 1.6 L4	?	(United Kingdom) Trevor Taylor	1-2
(United Kingdom) Bob Gerard (United Kingdom) Cooper Racing	Cooper-Ford	T84; T82	Ford Cosworth FVA 1.6 L4	?	(United Kingdom) Mike Beckwith	1, 3, 7, 9
(United Kingdom) Bob Gerard (United Kingdom) Cooper Racing	Cooper-Ford	T84; T82	Ford Cosworth FVA 1.6 L4	?	(United Kingdom) Robert Ellice	2
(United Kingdom) Bob Gerard (United Kingdom) Cooper Racing	Cooper-Ford	T84; T82	Ford Cosworth FVA 1.6 L4	?	(United Kingdom) Peter Gethin	3
(United Kingdom) Bob Gerard (United Kingdom) Cooper Racing	Cooper-Ford	T84; T82	Ford Cosworth FVA 1.6 L4	?	(United Kingdom) Alan Rollinson	4-5
(United Kingdom) Bob Gerard (United Kingdom) Cooper Racing	Cooper-Ford	T84; T82	Ford Cosworth FVA 1.6 L4	?	(United Kingdom) John Cardwell	4-5, 9
(United Kingdom) Bob Gerard (United Kingdom) Cooper Racing	Cooper-Ford	T84; T82	Ford Cosworth FVA 1.6 L4	?	(United Kingdom) Harry Stiller	7
(United Kingdom) Bob Gerard (United Kingdom) Cooper Racing	Cooper-Lotus	T73	Lotus LF 1.6 L4	?	(United Kingdom) Julian Gerard	9
(United Kingdom) Mike Costin	Brabham-Ford	BT10	Ford Cosworth FVA 1.6 L4	?	(United Kingdom) Mike Costin	2
(United Kingdom) Ron Harris Racing Division	Protos-Ford	16	Ford Cosworth FVA 1.6 L4	?	(United Kingdom) Brian Hart	2, 4, 6-8
(United Kingdom) Ron Harris Racing Division	Protos-Ford	16	Ford Cosworth FVA 1.6 L4	?	(France) Éric Offenstadt	3
(United Kingdom) Ron Harris Racing Division	Protos-Ford	16	Ford Cosworth FVA 1.6 L4	?	(Mexico) Pedro Rodríguez	4, 6, 8
(United Kingdom) Ron Harris Racing Division	Protos-Ford	16	Ford Cosworth FVA 1.6 L4	?	(Netherlands) Rob Slotemaker	7
(United Kingdom) Reg Parnell Racing	Parnell-Ford	Parnell	Ford Cosworth FVA 1.6 L4	?	(United Kingdom) Mike Spence	2
(United Kingdom) W. A. Jones	Alexis-Lotus	Mk 8	Lotus LF 1.6 L4	?	(United Kingdom) Philip Robinson	2-4, 6-7
(United Kingdom) W. A. Jones	Alexis-Lotus	Mk 8	Lotus LF 1.6 L4	?	(United Kingdom) Chris Meek	9-10
(West Germany) Gerhard Mitter	Brabham-Ford	BT23	Ford Cosworth FVA 1.6 L4	?	(West Germany) Gerhard Mitter	3
(United Kingdom) David Bridges Motor Sports	Brabham-Ford	BT16	Ford Cosworth SCB 1.5 L4	D	(United Kingdom) Brian Redman	3, 9
(United Kingdom) David Bridges Motor Sports	Lola-Ford	T100	Ford Cosworth FVA 1.6 L4	D	(United Kingdom) Brian Redman	6, 9-10
(Switzerland) Midland Racing Team	Brabham-Lotus	BT10; BT16; BT18	Lotus LF 1.6 L4	?	(Switzerland) Paul Blum	4-5
(Switzerland) Midland Racing Team	Brabham-Lotus	BT10; BT16; BT18	Lotus LF 1.6 L4	?	(Switzerland) Bruno Frey	4-5
(Switzerland) Midland Racing Team	Lotus	41C	Lotus LF 1.6 L4	?	(Switzerland) Walter Habegger	4-5
(Austria) Auto Sport Club Schartner-Bombe	Brabham-Lotus	BT9	Lotus LF 1.6 L4	?	(Austria) Gerhard Krammer	5
(United Kingdom) Mercury Stable Motor Racing	U2-Lotus	Mk 6B	Lotus LF 1.6 L4	?	(United Kingdom) Arthur Mallock	7
Ford France SA	Matra-Ford	MS5	Ford Cosworth FVA 1.6 L4	?	(France) Jo Schlesser	7-9
(United Kingdom) Graham Owen	Cooper-Ford	T83	Ford Cosworth SCB 1.5 L4	?	(United Kingdom) Peter Gaydon	9
(United Kingdom) Frank Lythgoe Racing	McLaren-Ford	M4A	Ford Cosworth FVA 1.6 L4	F	(United Kingdom) Alan Rollinson	9-10
(Italy) Nanni Galli	Brabham-Alfa Romeo	BT23	Alfa Romeo GTA 1.6 L4	?	(Italy) Nanni Galli	10
(Italy) Luigi Bertocco	Bertocco-Alfa Romeo	Bertocco	Alfa Romeo Giulia 1.6 L4	?	(Italy) Francesco Vento	10

- Pink background denotes graded drivers

== Results and standings ==
=== Races ===
Round	Name	Circuit	Date	Winning driver	Winning car	Winning team	Championship Race Winner	Results
1	(United Kingdom) Guards 100	Snetterton Motor Racing Circuit	24 March	(Austria) Jochen Rindt	Brabham BT23	Roy Winkelmann Racing	(United Kingdom) Alan Rees	Result
2	(United Kingdom) BARC 200	Silverstone Circuit	27 March	(Austria) Jochen Rindt	Brabham BT23	Roy Winkelmann Racing	(United Kingdom) Alan Rees	Result
3	(West Germany) ADAC Eifelrennen	Nürburgring Südschleife	23 April	(Austria) Jochen Rindt	Brabham BT23	Roy Winkelmann Racing	(Belgium) Jacky Ickx	Result
4	(West Germany) Deutschland Trophäe	Hockenheimring	9 July	(Australia) Frank Gardner	Brabham BT23	Motor Racing Developments	(Australia) Frank Gardner	Result
5	(Austria) Flugplatzrennen Tulln-Langenlebarn	Tulln-Langenlebarn Airfield Circuit	16 July	(Austria) Jochen Rindt	Brabham BT23	Roy Winkelmann Racing	(France) Jean-Pierre Beltoise	Result
6	(Spain) Gran Premio de Madrid	Circuito del Jarama	23 July	(United Kingdom) Jim Clark	Lotus 48	Team Lotus	(United Kingdom) Chris Irwin	Result
7	(Netherlands) Grote Prijs van Zandvoort	Circuit Park Zandvoort	30 July	(Belgium) Jacky Ickx	Matra MS5	Tyrrell Racing Organisation	(Belgium) Jacky Ickx	Result
8	(Italy) Gran Premio del Mediterraneo	Autodromo di Pergusa	20 August	(United Kingdom) Jackie Stewart	Matra MS7	Tyrrell Racing Organisation	(France) Jean-Pierre Beltoise	Result
9	(United Kingdom) Guards Trophy	Brands Hatch	28 August	(Austria) Jochen Rindt	Brabham BT23	Roy Winkelmann Racing	(France) Jo Schlesser	Result
10	(Italy) Gran Premio di Roma	ACI Vallelunga Circuit	8 October	(Belgium) Jacky Ickx	Matra MS7	Tyrrell Racing Organisation	(Belgium) Jacky Ickx	Result

=== Drivers ===
Note: Graded drivers, e.g. Jochen Rindt, were ineligible to score points.

Points distribution was:

- First place: 9 points
- Second place: 6 points
- Third place: 4 points
- Fourth place: 3 points
- Fifth place: 2 points
- Sixth place: 1 point

Pos	Driver	SNE (United Kingdom)	SIL (United Kingdom)	NÜR (West Germany)	HOC (West Germany)	TUL (Austria)	JAR (Spain)	ZAN (Netherlands)	EMM (Italy)	BRH (United Kingdom)	VLL (Italy)	Pts
1	(Belgium) Jacky Ickx	DNS	7	3	10	5		1	3	5	1	45
2	(Australia) Frank Gardner	Ret	6	12	1	4	10	3	9	4	4	34
3	(France) Jean-Pierre Beltoise	Ret	Ret	10		3	Ret	4	2	Ret	2	27
4	(United Kingdom) Piers Courage	7	Ret	5	3	9	8	2	Ret	Ret	Ret	24
5	(United Kingdom) Alan Rees	3	2	9		11	11	5	6	Ret	7	23
6	(United Kingdom) Chris Irwin	Ret		7	Ret	7	3	Ret	Ret	DNQ		15
7	(France) Johnny Servoz-Gavin			Ret		8	5	Ret	5		3	15
8	(France) Jo Schlesser							Ret	4	3		13
9	(United Kingdom) Brian Hart		Ret		2		Ret	6	8			8
10	(United Kingdom) Brian Redman			Ret			6			8	5	8
11	(United Kingdom) Robin Widdows	Ret	8	DNS	4	Ret	9	7		Ret	11	8
12	(West Germany) Hubert Hahne	DNS		4						9		7
13	(United Kingdom) Jackie Oliver	Ret		11		Ret	DNS		Ret	6	Ret	3
14	(United Kingdom) Philip Robinson		11	DNS				Ret				2
=	(West Germany) Gerhard Mitter			8								2
=	(United Kingdom) Ian Raby	Ret	Ret	16	5	13	Ret	Ret				2
17	(United Kingdom) Alan Rollinson				6	10				Ret	13	1
=	(France) Jean-Pierre Jaussaud						Ret				6	1
	(United Kingdom) Robert Lamplough	DNS	Ret		Ret		12	10		DSQ	12	0
	(United Kingdom) Trevor Taylor	Ret	Ret									0
	(France) Henri Pescarolo									10		0
	(United Kingdom) Mike Beckwith	Ret		Ret				11		Ret		0
	(United Kingdom) Andrew Fletcher	Ret			7			12		DNQ	Ret	0
	(United Kingdom) Chris Lambert	DSQ	Ret								10	0
	(United Kingdom) Mike Costin		Ret									0
	(United Kingdom) Jimmy Veitch		Ret									0
	(United Kingdom) Robert Ellice		Ret									0
	(United Kingdom) Peter Gethin			14								0
	(Switzerland) Walter Habegger				8	12						0
	(Switzerland) Bruno Frey				9	Ret						0
	(Switzerland) Paul Blum				Ret	Ret						0
	(United Kingdom) John Cardwell				Ret	Ret				Ret		0
	(Austria) Gerhard Krammer					DNQ						0
	(Mexico) Moisés Solana						13					0
	(Spain) Paco Godia						DNS					0
	(Netherlands) Gijs van Lennep							8				0
	(United Kingdom) Arthur Mallock							Ret				0
	(Netherlands) Rob Slotemaker							Ret				0
	(Italy) Andrea de Adamich							Ret				0
	(United Kingdom) Julian Gerard									Ret		0
	(United Kingdom) Mike Walker									DNQ		0
	(United Kingdom) Chris Meek									DNQ	14	0
	(United Kingdom) Peter Gaydon									DNQ		0
	(Italy) Francesco Vento										Ret	0
	(United Kingdom) Malcolm Payne										Ret	0
	(United Kingdom) Keith St. John										Ret	0
	(France) Éric Offenstadt										Ret	0
	(United Kingdom) Philip Robinson										Ret	0
	(West Germany) Willy Martini										Ret	0
Graded drivers ineligible for points
	(Austria) Jochen Rindt	1	1	1		1	Ret			1		0
	(United Kingdom) Graham Hill	2	NC	15		6	Ret		7	7	8	0
	(New Zealand) Denis Hulme	4	NC									0
	(New Zealand) Bruce McLaren	5	4	6								0
	(Australia) Jack Brabham	6	10	13		2	4			Ret		0
	(United Kingdom) Jackie Stewart	Ret	5				2		1	2		0
	(United Kingdom) John Surtees	Ret	3	2						DNQ		0
	(United Kingdom) Jim Clark			Ret		Ret	1		NC			0
	(Switzerland) Jo Siffert		NC	Ret							9	0
	(Mexico) Pedro Rodríguez				NC		7		NC			0
Pos	Driver	SNE (United Kingdom)	SIL (United Kingdom)	NÜR (West Germany)	HOC (West Germany)	TUL (Austria)	JAR (Spain)	ZAN (Netherlands)	EMM (Italy)	BRH (United Kingdom)	VAL (Italy)	Pts

Colour	Result
Gold	Winner
Silver	Second place
Bronze	Third place
Green	Points classification
Blue	Non-points classification
Blue	Non-classified finish (NC)
Purple	Retired, not classified (Ret)
Red	Did not qualify (DNQ)
Red	Did not pre-qualify (DNPQ)
Black	Disqualified (DSQ)
White	Did not start (DNS)
White	Withdrew (WD)
White	Race cancelled (C)
Blank	Did not practice (DNP)
Blank	Did not arrive (DNA)
Blank	Excluded (EX)

== Non-championship race results ==
Other Formula Two races, which did not count towards the European Championship, also held in 1967.

Race Name	Circuit	Date	Winning driver	Constructor
(France) XXVII Grand Prix Automobile de Pau	Pau	2 April	(Austria) Jochen Rindt	(United Kingdom) Brabham-Ford
(Spain) II Gran Premio de Barcelona	Montjuïc	9 April	(United Kingdom) Jim Clark	(United Kingdom) Lotus-Ford
(United Kingdom) VIII Spring Trophy ‡	Oulton Park	15 April	(United Kingdom) Jackie Oliver	(United Kingdom) Lotus-Ford
(United Kingdom) I Guards' International Trophy	Mallory Park	14 May	(United Kingdom) John Surtees	(United Kingdom) Lola-Ford
(Belgium) IV Grote Prijs van Limborg	Zolder	21 May	(United Kingdom) John Surtees	(United Kingdom) Lola-Ford
(United Kingdom) XV London Trophy	Crystal Palace	29 May	(Belgium) Jacky Ickx	(France) Matra-Ford
(West Germany) II Rhein-Pokalrennen	Hockenheimring	11 June	(United Kingdom) Robin Widdows	(United Kingdom) Brabham-Ford
(France) XXXIII Grand Prix de Reims	Reims-Gueux	25 June	(Austria) Jochen Rindt	(United Kingdom) Brabham-Ford
(France) XV Grand Prix de Rouen-les-Essarts	Rouen-Les-Essarts	9 July	(Austria) Jochen Rindt	(United Kingdom) Brabham-Ford
(West Germany) XXIX Großer Preis von Deutschland ‡	Nürburgring	6 August	(United Kingdom) Jackie Oliver	(United Kingdom) Lotus-Ford
(Sweden) VII Sveriges Grand Prix	Karlskoga	13 August	(United Kingdom) Jackie Stewart	(France) Matra-Ford
(Finland) VII Suomen Grand Prix	Keimola	3 September	(United Kingdom) Jim Clark	(United Kingdom) Lotus-Ford
(Finland) I Hämeenlinnan Ajot	Ahvenisto	5 September	(Austria) Jochen Rindt	(United Kingdom) Brabham-Ford
(United Kingdom) XIV International Gold Cup ‡	Oulton Park	16 September	(United Kingdom) Jackie Stewart	(France) Matra-Ford
(France) XXVI Grand Prix d'Albi	Albi	24 September	(United Kingdom) Jackie Stewart	(France) Matra-Ford
(Spain) XV Gran Premio de España ‡	Jarama	12 November	(France) Johnny Servoz-Gavin	(France) Matra-Ford

‡ – Joint F1/F2 races. F2 winners shown.
