= Suna no Utsuwa =

Suna no Utsuwa may refer to:

- Suna no Utsuwa (novel), a 1961 novel by Seichō Matsumoto
- Castle of Sand, a 1974 film adaptation of the novel
- Suna no Utsuwa (TV series), a 2004 Japanese television drama series, based on the novel
