= Paul Blum =

American intelligence officer and translator (1898–1981)

- Paul Blum in the mountains of North Carolina in summer 1941, photographed by Donald Keene
- Born: Paul Charles Blum; March 31, 1898; Yamate, Yokohama, Japan
- Died: August 16, 1981 (aged 83); New York, U.S.
- Education: Yale University; Columbia University
- Occupations: Intelligence officer; businessman; writer; translator
- Employers: Office of Strategic Services; Central Intelligence Agency
- Military career
- Allegiance: United States of America
- Branch: United States Army
- Unit: United States Army Ambulance Service
- Conflicts: World War I
- Awards: Croix de Guerre

Paul Charles Blum (March 31, 1898 – August 16, 1981) was an American intelligence officer, businessman, writer and translator. He worked for the Office of Strategic Services (OSS) and its successor, the Central Intelligence Agency (CIA).

== Early life and education ==
Paul Charles Blum was born on March 31, 1898, in the Yamate foreign settlement of Yokohama, Japan. His father, Henri Blum, was a French Jew from the Alsace region of France, and was a distant relative of Prime Minister Léon Blum. His mother, Rose Blum (née Isaacs), was a Jewish American. Blum spent his childhood in Yokohama, graduated from Saint Joseph International School, and returned to France in 1912. After attending high school in Geneva, Blum graduated from Yale University. Blum was a fluent speaker of French.

When the United States entered into World War I, Blum enlisted in the United States Army Ambulance Service. He was awarded the Croix de Guerre. He lived in Paris after the end of the war and was allegedly associated with Jean Cocteau and Ernest Hemingway. In 1927, Blum translated the book The Life of Buddha: According to the Legends of Ancient India by André-Ferdinand Hérold, from the original French into English. In 1940, Nazi Germany invaded France and Blum moved to New York. He enrolled in Columbia University to study Japanese. Although he was raised in Yokohama, there were very few Westerners born in Japan at that time who understood Japanese, and Blum was not an exception. At Columbia, Blum befriended fellow student Donald Keene. In the summer of 1941, Blum and Keene lived together with others in a house in the mountains of North Carolina for private instruction in Japanese. During this time, Blum told Keene of his experience living in different countries. He also advised Keene, who was studying French literature, to study Japanese instead because of the fewer number of learners of Japanese in comparison to French.

== Career ==
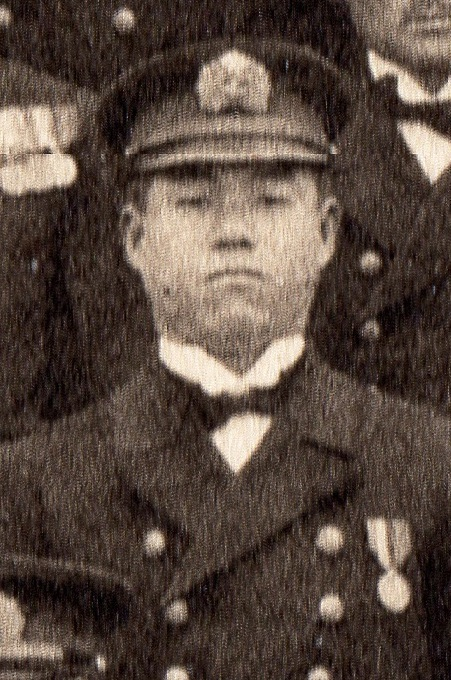
Yoshirō Fujimura

At the outbreak of the Pacific War, Blum joined the Office of Strategic Services (OSS). After working in Thailand and Portugal, he was assigned to the OSS office in Bern, Switzerland in October 1944. He worked there until the spring 1947, engaging in intelligence activities as a subordinate of Allen Dulles. In 1945, nearing the end of World War II, Blum was involved in the attempted peace initiatives brought by Yoshirō Fujimura, the former Japanese naval attaché in Berlin.

Blum also took part in Operation Sunrise, a series of secret negotiations in March 1945 in Switzerland between elements of the Nazi German SS and the OSS under Allen Dulles. He was tasked by Dulles to open the surrender talks with the emissaries of SS General Karl Wolff. On March 3, 1945, Blum met with Guido Zimmer, Luigi Parrilli and Eugen Dollmann in Lugano, Switzerland. This meeting set the stage for the March 8 meeting between Wolff and Dulles in Lucerne.

In 1948, Blum came to Japan as an attaché for the United States Embassy in Japan and worked at the GHQ's Ministry of Foreign Affairs in the Mitsui Main Building. He was disguised as a diplomat, but was actually working as the first chief of the Japan branch of the Central Intelligence Agency (CIA). This fact was kept secret at the time.

After arriving in Japan, Blum contacted Shintarō Ryū, the European correspondent for The Asahi Shimbun during World War II and later its managing editor. He got in touch with Yoshirō Fujimura to establish The Jupitor Corporation [sic], a trading company in Minami-Aoyama, Minato, Tokyo. Blum lived on the 2nd and 3rd floors of the company's building with Fujimura.

From approximately 1948, Blum started collecting intelligence by hosting the "Tuesday meetings", a series of roundtable discussions with leading Japanese figures and intellectuals at Tokyo's Imperial Hotel. In autumn 1949, Fujimura secured a large residence (a former Nabeshima clan residence) in Kamiyama-chō, Shibuya. The Tuesday meetings were moved there, held every second Tuesday of the month as an evening dinner. Blum reported the details of his activities to Washington every time. Shintarō Ryū of The Asahi Shimbun was the organizer of the meetings on the Japanese side. The gathered Japanese leaders included Shintarō Ryū, Shigeharu Matsumoto (chairman of the International House of Japan), Saburō Matsukata (managing director of Kyodo News), literary critic Samitarō Uramatsu, agricultural economist Seiichi Tobata, political scientist Masamichi Rōyama, Minister of Education Maeda Tamon and Keiai Sajima (director of Shin-Etsu Chemical). They were referred to as the "eight samurai". In the background of these activities was that Douglas MacArthur, the Supreme Commander of the Allied Forces, had not permitted the CIA to operate in Japan, and Blum had very few subordinates. At times, Prime Minister Shigeru Yoshida walked from the nearby residence of Takakichi Asō to participate, and Blum was also invited to Yoshida's residence in Ōiso. The Tuesday meetings were dissolved after the Treaty of San Francisco came into effect in April 1952.

== Retirement and death ==
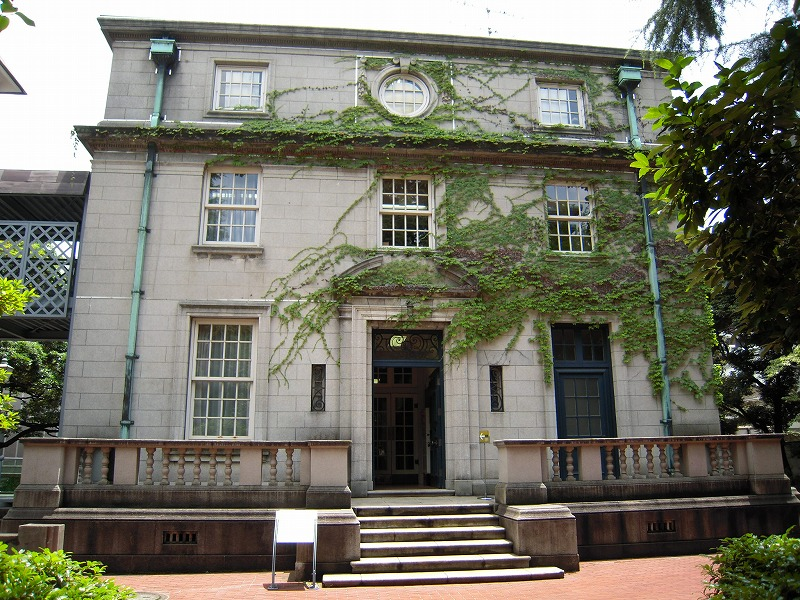
Blum donated his collection of Japanese-related literature to the Yokohama Archives of History.

After the Tuesday meetings were dissolved, Blum retired from the CIA. In 1956, he sold the residence in Kamiyama-chō. He worked in the private sector following his retirement.

Until Allen Dulles was appointed the Deputy Director of Central Intelligence in 1951, Blum was not a CIA officer, but a State Department employee and a personal collaborator of Dulles. In July 1952, following the peace treaty, Blum's name disappeared from the staff lists of the US Embassy in Japan and the GHQ's Ministry of Foreign Affairs. His recognized title is unclear, and some say it is inappropriate to call Blum the first CIA station chief in Japan.

Blum was a well-known collector of Japan-related literature and of ukiyo-e. Following his retirement from the CIA, he also completed the English translation (co-translation with Makiko Yamamoto) of Seichō Matsumoto's novel Points and Lines. In 1978, he moved to New York as a result of "rising living expenses and taxes due to the strong yen". At the request of the city of Yokohama, Blum donated his collection of books to the Yokohama Archives of History, which the city was preparing to open. This donation is said to have been recommended by Donald Keene. The museum opened in June 1981, and features "The Paul C. Blum Collection". Blum attended the museum's opening ceremony, but after returning to Japan he became ill and later died in New York on August 16, 1981. Additional donations were made to the Yokohama Archives of History in accordance with Blum's will. "The Paul C. Blum Collection" features approximately 5,200 Japanese-related foreign books written by Westerners since the 16th century. It also includes approximately 700 Japanese books related to Western studies and Yokohama, and approximately 500 items such as Yokohama ukiyo-e, kawaraban, and old European maps. In addition, there are materials related to Japanese scholar Basil Hall Chamberlain.

Takayasu Narimatsu, the founder of Japan's first spaghetti specialty store Hole in the Wall (壁の穴, Kabe no Ana), worked as a butler at Blum's residency at the time the Tuesday meetings were held. After World War II, Narimatsu worked as a language interpreter at the U.S. Yokosuka Navy Base. In 1948, Blum made an effort to recruit Narimatsu while he was reading a book by Norman Mailer on a coastal beach in Yokosuka. He declined once, but the next day he was contacted by the admiral of Yokosuka who persuaded him that "Mr. Blum is powerful". Narimatsu was treated well, but was given a gag order saying "Don't tell anyone what you saw or heard". Blum hired four people, including Narimatsu, to work in his residence during the Tuesday meetings. Narumatsu retired from Blum's residence in 1953 due to the dissolution of the Tuesday meetings after the peace treaty came into effect. The same year, he opened the spaghetti specialty store Hole in the Wall (壁の穴, Kabe no Ana) in Tamura-chō, Tokyo with financial support from Blum and other acquaintances. The store was named by Blum.

In 1998, Paul Blum's nephew Robert S. Greene, a jazz pianist, wrote a biography of Blum titled Blum-san!: Scholar, Soldier, Gentlemen, Spy, the Many Lives of Paul Blum, published by The Jupitor Corporation.

== Works ==
- Blum, Paul C. (1963). Yokohama in 1872: A Rambling Account of the Community in which the Asiatic Society of Japan was Founded. Tokyo: Asiatic Society of Japan.

=== Translations ===
- Hérold, A. Ferdinand [in French] (1927). The Life of Buddha: According to the Legends of Ancient India. Translated by Blum, Paul C. New York: Albert & Charles Boni.
- Kondō, Ichitarō (1955). Toshusai Sharaku (Worked 1794–1795). Kodansha Library of Japanese Art. Vol. 2. Translated by Blum, Paul C. Rutland, Vermont / Tokyo, Japan: Charles E. Tuttle Company.
- Matsumoto, Seichō (1970). Points and Lines. Translated by Yamamoto, Makiko; Blum, Paul C. Tokyo, Japan / Palo Alto, California: Kodansha International. ISBN 978-0-87011-126-6.
- Pezeu-Massabuau, Jacques (1978). The Japanese Islands: A Physical and Social Geography. Translated by Blum, Paul C. Rutland, Vermont: Charles E. Tuttle Company. ISBN 978-0-8048-1184-2.
