= Tobata (disambiguation) =

Tobata is a ward of the city of Kitakyushu in Japan.

Tobata may also refer to:

- Tobata Station, a railway station on the Kagoshima Main Line in Tobata
- 46596 Tobata, a main-belt minor planet
- Seiichi Tobata, a Japanese professor of agriculture
