= Masato Ide =

Japanese screenwriter (1920–1989)

Masato Ide ( 井 手 雅人, い で ま さ と, Ide Masato^{?}), born on January 1, 1920, in Saga, Japan and died on July 17, 1989, was a Japanese screenwriter and novelist.

== Selected filmography ==
=== Cinema ===
- 1951 : Sasurai no kōro
- 1951 : Koi no rantan
- 1952 : Musume jūku wa mada junjō yo
- 1953 : Kenbei
- 1955 : Dansei No. 1
- 1955 : Vanished Enlisted Man (Kieta chutai)
- 1955 : Gokumonchō
- 1956 : Hadashi no seishun
- 1957 : Kao
- 1957 : Sanjūrokunin no jōkyaku
- 1957 : The Loyal Forty-Seven Ronin (Dai Chūshingura)
- 1957 : Ippon-gatana dohyō iri
- 1958 : Point and Line (Ten to sen)
- 1960 : Sake to onna to yari
- 1961 : Official Gunman (Kēnju yaro ni gōyojin)
- 1961 : Confessions of a wife (Tsuma wa kokuhaku suru)
- 1961 : Yato kaze no naka o hashiru
- 1962 : Man with Te Dragon Tattoo (Hana to ryu)
- 1962 : Doburoku no Tatsu
- 1963 : Dokuritsu kikanjūtai imada shagekichu
- 1964 : Garakuta
- 1965 : Goben no tsubaki
- 1965 : Red Beard (赤 ひ げ, Akahige) by Akira Kurosawa
- 1965 : Shonin no isu
- 1966 : Abare Gōemon
- 1968 : Seishun
- 1968 : The Sands of Kurobe (黒 部 の 太陽, Kurobe no taiyō) by Kei Kumai
- 1977 : Arasuka monogatari
- 1978 : The Demon (鬼畜, Kichiku) by Yoshitarō Nomura
- 1978 : Dainamaito don don
- 1980 : Kagemusha, Shadow of the Warrior (影武者, Kagemusha) by Akira Kurosawa
- 1980 : Warui yatsura
- 1980 : Furueru shita
- 1985 : Ran (乱) by Akira Kurosawa
- 1986 : Shiroi yabō
- 1987 : Jirō monogatari
- 1992 : The Oil-Hell Murder (女 殺 油 地獄, Onna goroshi abura no jigoku) by Hideo Gosha

== Television ==
- List of Lone Wolf and Cub episodes

== Books ==
- Masato Ide "People and Scenarios" (1991, Scenario Writers Association)

== Awards ==
- 1987 Nominee BAFTA Film Award
- Best Screenplay - Adapted Ran (1985)
- 1979 Nominee Award of the Japanese Academy
- Best Screenplay - Kichiku (1978) & Dainamaito don don (1978)
