= Tokyo Express (disambiguation) =

Tokyo Express, Imperial Japanese Navy re-supply trips done by warships during World War II.

Tokyo Express may also refer to:

- Tokyo Express (flights), regular Soviet (and later Russian) military flights around Japan
- Tokyo Express, also known as Points and Lines, a murder mystery novel by Seichō Matsumoto
- Tokio Express, a container ship scrapped in 2000
- Tokyu Corporation, a railway company "Tokyo Express Electric Railway Share Company".
- Tokyo Express: The Guadalcanal Naval Campaign – 1942, a board wargame
