= 1967 Guards 100 =

Race details
- Date: 24 March 1967
- Official name: I Guards 100
- Location: Snetterton Circuit; Thetford, England
- Course: Permanent racing facility
- Course length: 4.361 km (2.7098 miles)
- Distance: 40 laps, 218.05 km (135.49 miles)
- Weather: Sunny, Mild, Dry

Pole position
Driver	(Austria) Jochen Rindt	Roy Winkelmann Racing
- Time: 1:28.8

Fastest lap
Drivers	(United Kingdom) Jackie Stewart	Tyrell Racing Organisation
	(United Kingdom) Graham Hill	Team Lotus
	(Austria) Jochen Rindt	Roy Winkelmann Racing
- Time: 1:28.2

Podium
First	(Austria) Jochen Rindt	Roy Winkelmann Racing
Second	(United Kingdom) Graham Hill	Team Lotus
Third	(United Kingdom) Alan Rees	Roy Winkelmann Racing

The Guards 100 was a European Formula Two race held on 23 March 1967 at the Snetterton Circuit in Thetford, England.

== Results ==
=== Heat 1 ===
Pos.	No.	Driver	Entrant	Constructor	Time/Retired
1	3	(Austria) Jochen Rindt	Roy Winkelmann Racing	Brabham-Cosworth	15:02.8
2	1	(Australia) Jack Brabham	Motor Racing Developments	Brabham-Cosworth	+ 3.5 s
3	2	(New Zealand) Denny Hulme	Motor Racing Developments	Brabham-Cosworth	+ 4.6 s
4	5	(New Zealand) Bruce McLaren	Bruce McLaren Motor Racing	McLaren-Cosworth	+ 11.0 s
5	4	(United Kingdom) Graham Hill	Team Lotus	Lotus-Cosworth	+ 11.0 s
6	12	(United Kingdom) Alan Rees	Roy Winkelmann Racing	Brabham-Cosworth	+ 13.8 s
7	31	(United Kingdom) Piers Courage	John Coombs	McLaren-Cosworth	+ 17.8 s
8	14	(United Kingdom) Robin Widdows	Witley Racing Syndicate	Brabham-Cosworth	+ 21.6 s
9	11	(Australia) Frank Gardner	Motor Racing Developments	Brabham-Cosworth	+ 25.0 s
10	20	(United Kingdom) Chris Irwin	Lola Racing Ltd	Lola-BMW	+ 26.4 s
11	33	(United Kingdom) Mike Beckwith	Bob Gerard – Cooper Racing	Cooper-Cosworth	+ 29.6 s
12	27	(United Kingdom) Jackie Oliver	Lotus Components, Ltd.	Lotus-Cosworth	+ 29.8 s
13	26	(West Germany) Hubert Hahne	BMW	Lola-BMW	+ 50.6 s
14	17	(United Kingdom) Andrew Fletcher	Andrew Fletcher	Brabham-Lotus	+ 1 Lap
Ret	19	(United Kingdom) Ian Raby	Ian Raby Racing	Brabham-Lotus	8 laps
Ret	7	(United Kingdom) John Surtees	Lola Racing Ltd	Lola-Cosworth	8 laps – Shock absorber
Ret	25	(France) Jean-Pierre Beltoise	Matra Sports	Matra-Cosworth	5 laps – Fuel injection
Ret	6	(United Kingdom) Jackie Stewart	Tyrrell Racing Organisation	Matra-Cosworth	5 laps – Fuel feed
Ret	23	(United Kingdom) Robert Lamplough	Frank Manning Racing	Lola-Lotus	4 laps – Fuel injection
Ret	15	(United Kingdom) Chris Lambert	McKechnie Racing Organisation	Brabham-Cosworth	4 laps – Gear linkage
Ret	32	(United Kingdom) Trevor Taylor	Bob Gerard – Cooper Racing	Cooper-Cosworth	3 laps – Handling
Ret	24	(Belgium) Jacky Ickx	Tyrrell Racing Organisation	Matra-Cosworth	2 laps – Ignition

=== Heat 2 ===
Pos.	No.	Driver	Entrant	Constructor	Time/Retired
1	2	(New Zealand) Denny Hulme	Motor Racing Developments	Brabham-Cosworth	15:03.4
2	1	(Australia) Jack Brabham	Motor Racing Developments	Brabham-Cosworth	+ 1.4 s
3	12	(United Kingdom) Alan Rees	Roy Winkelmann Racing	Brabham-Cosworth	+ 3.8 s
4	11	(Australia) Frank Gardner	Motor Racing Developments	Brabham-Cosworth	+ 4.8 s
5	5	(New Zealand) Bruce McLaren	Bruce McLaren Motor Racing	McLaren-Cosworth	+ 5.0 s
6	4	(United Kingdom) Graham Hill	Team Lotus	Lotus-Cosworth	+ 9.4 s
7	6	(United Kingdom) Jackie Stewart	Tyrrell Racing Organisation	Matra-Cosworth	+ 20.4 s
8	33	(United Kingdom) Mike Beckwith	Bob Gerard – Cooper Racing	Cooper-Cosworth	+ 21.0 s
9	20	(United Kingdom) Chris Irwin	Lola Racing Ltd	Lola-BMW	+ 23.6 s
10	7	(United Kingdom) John Surtees	Lola Racing Ltd	Lola-Cosworth	+ 33.2 s
11	31	(United Kingdom) Piers Courage	John Coombs	McLaren-Cosworth	+ 1 Lap – Not running, spark plug
12	32	(United Kingdom) Trevor Taylor	Bob Gerard – Cooper Racing	Cooper-Cosworth	+ 1 Lap
13	17	(United Kingdom) Andrew Fletcher	Andrew Fletcher	Brabham-Lotus	+ 1 Lap
14	19	(United Kingdom) Ian Raby	Ian Raby Racing	Brabham-Lotus	+ 2 Laps
NC	14	(United Kingdom) Robin Widdows	Witley Racing Syndicate	Brabham-Cosworth	+ 2 Laps – Ignition
NC	23	(United Kingdom) Robert Lamplough	Frank Manning Racing	Lola-Lotus	+ 2 Laps
Ret	26	(West Germany) Hubert Hahne	BMW	Lola-BMW	6 Laps – Shock absorber
Ret	27	(United Kingdom) Jackie Oliver	Lotus Components, Ltd.	Lotus-Cosworth	5 Laps – Clutch
NC	25	(France) Jean-Pierre Beltoise	Matra Sports	Matra-Cosworth	+ 5 laps
Ret	3	(Austria) Jochen Rindt	Roy Winkelmann Racing	Brabham-Cosworth	1 Lap – Clutch
DQ	15	(United Kingdom) Chris Lambert	McKechnie Racing Organisation	Brabham-Cosworth	Not under starter's orders
DNS	24	(Belgium) Jacky Ickx	Tyrrell Racing Organisation	Matra-Cosworth	–

=== Final ===
Pos.	No.	Driver	Entrant	Constructor	Time/Retired	Points
1	3	(Austria) Jochen Rindt	Roy Winkelmann Racing	Brabham-Cosworth	59:40.6	
2	4	(United Kingdom) Graham Hill	Team Lotus	Lotus-Cosworth	+ 0.0 s	
3	12	(United Kingdom) Alan Rees	Roy Winkelmann Racing	Brabham-Cosworth	+ 42.6 s	9
4	2	(New Zealand) Denny Hulme	Motor Racing Developments	Brabham-Cosworth	+ 55.2 s	
5	5	(New Zealand) Bruce McLaren	Bruce McLaren Motor Racing	McLaren-Cosworth	+ 1:08.4 s	
6	1	(Australia) Jack Brabham	Motor Racing Developments	Brabham-Cosworth	+ 1:23.4 s	
7	31	(United Kingdom) Piers Courage	John Coombs	McLaren-Cosworth	+ 1 Lap	6
NC	19	(United Kingdom) Ian Raby	Ian Raby Racing	Brabham-Lotus	+ 8 laps	
Ret	27	(United Kingdom) Jackie Oliver	Lotus Components, Ltd.	Lotus-Cosworth	8 laps – Crash	
Ret	6	(United Kingdom) Jackie Stewart	Tyrrell Racing Organisation	Matra-Cosworth	8 laps – Fuel starvation	
Ret	14	(United Kingdom) Robin Widdows	Witley Racing Syndicate	Brabham-Cosworth	4 Laps – Clutch	
Ret	11	(Australia) Frank Gardner	Motor Racing Developments	Brabham-Cosworth	3 Laps – Clutch	
Ret	32	(United Kingdom) Trevor Taylor	Bob Gerard – Cooper Racing	Cooper-Cosworth	2 laps – Clutch	
Ret	25	(France) Jean-Pierre Beltoise	Matra Sports	Matra-Cosworth	2 laps – Rear axle	
Ret	7	(United Kingdom) John Surtees	Lola Racing Ltd	Lola-Cosworth	1 lap – Throttle	
Ret	33	(United Kingdom) Mike Beckwith	Bob Gerard – Cooper Racing	Cooper-Cosworth	0 Laps – Accident	
Ret	20	(United Kingdom) Chris Irwin	Lola Racing Ltd	Lola-BMW	0 Laps – Accident	
Ret	17	(United Kingdom) Andrew Fletcher	Andrew Fletcher	Brabham-Lotus	0 Laps – Accident	
DQ	15	(United Kingdom) Chris Lambert	McKechnie Racing Organisation	Brabham-Cosworth	19 Laps – Not under starter's orders	
DNS	24	(Belgium) Jacky Ickx	Tyrrell Racing Organisation	Matra-Cosworth	-	
DNS	23	(United Kingdom) Robert Lamplough	Frank Manning Racing	Lola-Lotus	-	
DNS	26	(West Germany) Hubert Hahne	BMW	Lola-BMW	-	

Note: Pink background denotes graded drivers ineligible for championship points
