= Suna no Utsuwa (novel) =

Mystery novel by Seichō Matsumoto

- Author: Seichō Matsumoto
- Original title: 砂の器 (Suna no Utsuwa)
- Language: Japanese
- Genre: Social mystery
- Publisher: Kobunsha
- Publication date: 1961
- Publication place: Japan

Suna no Utsuwa (砂の器), also known as Inspector Imanishi Investigates, is a mystery novel written by Seichō Matsumoto. The novel centers on senior detective Eitaro Imanishi in his efforts to unravel an unsolved murder at a Tokyo train station, while also exploring the generational differences between Japanese who lived through World War II, and the younger generation who lived primarily during the post-war era, as well as the urban, foreign-influenced avant-garde popular culture in contrast to fading traditional Japanese culture.

== Publication history ==
Suna no Utsuwa was originally serialized as a serial in the Japanese newspaper Yomiuri Shimbun between 1960 and 1961 and then published by Kobunsha in 1961. The novel has been made into film and TV dramas.

== Plot ==
The story begins at Kamata Station in Tokyo in 1960, when a body is discovered in the trainyard beaten to death. Veteran detective Eitaro Imanishi investigates based on only two clues: the victim was seen at a cafe speaking to another man with distinct Tōhoku dialect before the murder, and the word "Kameda" was overheard. Imanishi travels to the Tōhoku region with junior detective Hiroshi Yoshimura to investigate but finds no convincing leads. However, while on the return trip, they briefly encounter a famous group of young, avant-garde artists called the "Nouveau Group", who are on tour. Yoshimura, as a younger-generation Japanese is well acquainted with this group, while Imanishi being part of the pre-war generation, is not.

The novel introduces the Nouveau Group further, a collection of artists in their 20's from various backgrounds, but centers around two major figures: Eiryo Waga a cutting-edge music composer, and Sekigawa Shigeo an art critic. Eiryo Waga is engaged to Sachiko Tadokoro, whose father is a well-to-do politician, while Sekigawa Shigeo is carrying on a love-tryst with a bar hostess named Emiko Miura in secret.

As the investigation continues, Detective Imanishi determines that the murdered man was Miki Ken'ichi, a respected former police officer who used to live in Shimane Prefecture, and that the accent overheard was in fact local to Shimane Prefecture, not Tohoku. Miki Ken'ichi was on pilgrimage to Ise Shrine and for reasons unclear headed to Tokyo rather than return home afterwards. He was killed the night of his arrival in Tokyo. During the investigation, another member of the Nouveau Group, Kunio Miyata, dies from a heart attack from mysterious circumstances, and another member of his acting group Rieko Naruse takes her own life with a vague suicide note.

Imanishi continues to follow many leads that prove unsuccessful. Meanwhile, the story focuses on critic Sekigawa who pressures his lover Emiko to terminate their unborn child prematurely. Emiko refuses, and she too dies under mysterious circumstances after a fall that triggers a miscarriage.

Imanishi's investigations lead to Osaka where he discovers a false family register filed after the fire-bombings of March 1945, by a homeless youth who had runaway from Shimane Prefecture. With some effort, Imanishi is able to determine that this youth is Eiryo Waga, formerly Motoura Hideo, who has gone to great lengths to hide his impoverished upbringing and build a new identity. Ken'ichi's visit to Tokyo threatened to expose his background just as he was planning to wed into high-society, and thus Waga murders him with an infatuated Rieko was an accomplice to cover up the evidence.

A series of additional clues help link Waga's skills with music and cutting-edge sound technology to the deaths of Miyata and Emiko through the use of ultrasonic waves: first to induce a heart attack in Miyata, and to assist Sekigawa in forcing an abortion on Emiko, though the latter lead to her unintentional death.

The novel ends with Waga's arrest at Haneda Airport, but Imanishi insists that Yoshimura get credit for the arrest because he feels Yoshimura represents the younger generation, and "from now on, it is the era of you young people".

== Adaptations ==
- Castle of Sand (1974), a Shochiku production, directed by Yoshitarō Nomura and starring Tetsurō Tamba.
- Suna no Utsuwa (1977), a Fuji TV production, mini-series in 6 episodes. directed by Takuji Tominaga. It stars Tatsuya Nakadai (Eitaro Imanishi) and Masakazu Tamura (Eiryo Waga).
- Suna no Utsuwa (2004), a TBS production, starring Masahiro Nakai as Eiryo Waga and Ken Watanabe as Eitaro Imanishi.
