= Isaac Shapiro =

American lawyer (1931–2025)

- Born: 1931; Japan
- Died: July 7, 2025 (aged 93–94)
- Education: Columbia University (BA, LLB)
- Occupation: lawyer
- Employer: Skadden, Arps, Slate, Meagher & Flom
- Known for: President of Japan Society
- Spouse: Jacqueline Weiss

Isaac Shapiro (1931 – July 9, 2025) was an American lawyer with Skadden, Arps, Slate, Meagher & Flom. He was an expert in Soviet law, Japanese law, and served as the president of Japan Society. He also wrote widely about Japan and Japanese-American relations.

== Biography ==
Shapiro was born in Japan in 1931 as a Stateless person. His father was Constantine Shapiro, a Russian Jewish musician who left the country with his family after the Russian Revolution. The elder Shapiro lived in Germany, where he was the first cellist of the Frankfurter Opern- und Museumsorchester, and moved to Japan, where he pioneered the establishment of Western classical music. His mother was a concert pianist who met and married the elder Shapiro in Berlin, before leaving for Harbin, China, and Japan. He was also a nephew of concert pianist Maxim Shapiro and Russian-French philosopher Vladimir Lossky.

Shapiro grew up in the Japanese-occupied Harbin and Yokohama during World War II. He studied at Saint Joseph College, Yokohama but his studies were interrupted by the war. He moved to the United States in 1945, after then-marine officer John C. Munn hired him as translator and was made his guardian. He attended Punahou School in Honolulu, graduating from Columbia College in 1954, and Columbia Law School in 1956. He was also a Fulbright scholar and studied at the University of Paris.

He joined Milbank Tweed upon graduating from law school and opened the firm's first Japanese office in Tokyo in 1977, which led to protests from the Japan Federation of Bar Associations, resulting in a freeze on the establishment of foreign law offices in Japan. However, his trailblazing effort subsequently led to the entry of other foreign law firms. In 1986, he joined Skadden, Arps, Slate, Meagher & Flom and headed its international practice, opening its practice in Japan. He became of counsel to the firm in 2001.

Shapiro was a director of Bank of Tokyo Mitsubishi Foundation in New York City, and served as a past president of the Isamu Noguchi Foundation. He also served as president of the Japan Society from 1970 to 1977.

He was the author of Edokko: Growing Up a Foreigner in Wartime Japan, an autobiography of his childhood. He was also the author of The Soviet Legal System, a textbook on Soviet law, co-written with Columbia law professor John N. Hazard.

In 2006, Shapiro was awarded an Order of the Rising Sun, Gold Rays with Neck Ribbon by the Emperor of Japan for his service in promoting U.S.-Japan cultural relations.

== Personal life and death ==
Shapiro was married to Jacqueline Weiss, whom he met at Columbia Law. They had three children. Weiss comes from a family of rabbis and is a niece of the former rabbis of Congregation Emanu-El in San Francisco and the Rockdale Temple in Cincinnati.

Shapiro died on July 7, 2025 at the age of 94.
