= Saint Joseph College, Yokohama =

Saint Joseph's International College
- セント・ジョセフ・インターナショナル・カレッジ
- Yokohama City; Japan

Information
- Type: K-12
- Religious affiliation: Catholic
- Established: 1901
- Closed: 2000

Saint Joseph College (セント・ジョセフ・カレッジ) was a Catholic international school, located on the "Bluff" in Naka-ku, Yokohama, Japan. The school started as a division of Gyosei Gakuin in 1888 and was established as an independent school by the Marianists in 1901. St. Joseph closed with the graduating class of June 2000. It served kindergarten, elementary education and secondary education primarily to the expatriate community in Yokohama.

The school was the host to Japan's first Scout troop, established in 1911.

== Alumni ==
- Ureo Egawa (Willy Mueller), class of 1921, actor
- Charles J. Pedersen, class of 1922, awarded the Nobel Prize in Chemistry in 1987
- Andy Albeck (1921–2010), head of United Artists movie studio
- Isamu Noguchi, class of 1921, Japanese-American artist and landscape architect
- Masumi Okada (Otto Sevaldsen) (1935–2006), class of 1949, actor, singer, stand-up comedian, emcee, and film producer
- Paul Blum, American intelligence officer
- Isaac Shapiro, American lawyer, former president of Japan Society
