= The Sands of Kurobe =

- Film poster
- Directed by: Kei Kumai
- Written by: Masato Ide; Kei Kumai; Shōji Kimoto (story)
- Produced by: Toshiro Mifune
- Starring: Toshiro Mifune; Yujiro Ishihara; Osamu Takizawa; Takashi Shimura; Shūji Sano
- Cinematography: Mitsuji Kanau
- Edited by: Mutsuo Tanji
- Music by: Toshiro Mayuzumi
- Release date: February 17, 1968 (Japan)
- Running time: 196 minutes
- Country: Japan
- Language: Japanese

The Sands of Kurobe (Japanese: 黒部の太陽, Hepburn: Kurobe no Taiyō) is a 1968 Japanese epic drama film directed by Kei Kumai. It is an adaptation of the novel The Sun of Kurobe (黒部の太陽; Kurobe no Taiyō) that dramatizes the construction of the massive Kurobe Dam, the tallest dam in Japan. The film was Japan's submission to the 41st Academy Awards for the Academy Award for Best Foreign Language Film, but was not accepted as a nominee. Produced by its stars Toshiro Mifune and Yujiro Ishihara, the film's first run in cinemas lasted for a month, significantly longer than the week or ten days that films at that time usually ran in Japan.

== Cast ==
- Toshiro Mifune as Kitagawa
- Yujiro Ishihara as Iwaoka
- Osamu Takizawa as Otagaki
- Takashi Shimura as Ashimura
- Shūji Sano as Hirata
- Jūkichi Uno as Mori
- Ryūtarō Tatsumi as Genzō
- Isao Tamagawa as Sayama
- Takeshi Katō as Kunikida
- Sumio Takatsu as Ōno
- Tappie Shimokawa
- Asao Sano
- Mizuho Suzuki as Senda
- Eijirō Yanagi as Fujimura
- Akira Yamanouchi as Tsukamoto
- Masao Shimizu as Tayama
- Hideaki Nitani as Odagiri

== See also ==
- List of submissions to the 41st Academy Awards for Best Foreign Language Film
- List of Japanese submissions for the Academy Award for Best Foreign Language Film
