= The Demon (1978 film) =

1978 Japanese film

- Theatrical poster
- Directed by: Yoshitaro Nomura
- Written by: Masato Ide
- Based on: "Kichiku" by Seichō Matsumoto
- Produced by: Yoshiki Nomura; Yoshitarō Nomura
- Cinematography: Takashi Kawamata
- Music by: Yasushi Akutagawa
- Distributed by: Shochiku
- Release dates: October 7, 1978 (Japan); June 22, 1979 (United States)
- Running time: 110 minutes
- Country: Japan
- Language: Japanese

The Demon (Japanese: 鬼畜, Hepburn: Kichiku) is a 1978 Japanese psychological drama film directed by Yoshitarō Nomura and written by Masato Ide, based on the short story by Seichō Matsumoto.

== Plot ==
Consumed by the jealousy and power struggles of their own relationships, a man, his mistress and his wife involve three children in their own games-with tragic results. After Sōkichi stops providing his mistress with monetary support, she leaves her three children with him, whom she insists are also his, and disappears. Sōkichi is bewildered and his wife is livid. With regard only for their own discomfort, they go about remedying their situation.

== Cast ==
- Ken Ogata as Sōkichi Takeshita
- Shima Iwashita as Oume, Sōkichi's wife
- Mayumi Ogawa as Kikuyo, Sōkichi's lover
- Hiroki Iwase as Riichi, Sōkichi and Kikuyo's 1st son

== Awards ==
- 1979 Awards of the Japanese Academy
  - Won
    - Best Actor - Ken Ogata
    - Best Director - Yoshitarō Nomura
  - Nominated
    - Best Film
    - Best Music Score - Yasushi Akutagawa
    - Best Screenplay - Masato Ide
- 1979 Blue Ribbon Awards
  - Best Actor - Ken Ogata
  - Best Director - Yoshitarō Nomura
- 1978 Hochi Film Awards
  - Best Actor - Ken Ogata
- 1979 Kinema Junpo Awards
  - Best Actor - Ken Ogata
- 1979 Mainichi Film Concours
  - Best Actor - Ken Ogata
  - Best Art Direction - Kyohei Morita
  - Best Cinematography - Takashi Kawamata
