= Suspicion (1982 film) =

- Film poster

Japanese name
- Kanji: 疑惑
Transcriptions
- Revised Hepburn: Giwaku
- Directed by: Yoshitaro Nomura
- Written by: Motomu Furuta; Motomu Furuta
- Based on: Giwaku; 1981 novel by Seichō Matsumoto
- Produced by: Yoshitaro Nomura
- Starring: Kaori Momoi
- Cinematography: Takashi Kawamata
- Music by: Yasushi Akutagawa
- Distributed by: Shochiku
- Release date: September 18, 1982 (Japan)
- Running time: 127 minutes
- Country: Japan
- Language: Japanese

Suspicion (Japanese: 疑惑, Hepburn: Giwaku) is a 1982 Japanese film directed by Yoshitaro Nomura. It is based on the novel with the same name by Seichō Matsumoto.

== Plot summary ==
A woman is saved from a car in which her lover drowned. The police are suspicious, because her affect is hardly that of a grieving spouse. When the dead man is revealed to be extremely rich she is charged with murder, and is assigned a divorced female lawyer to defend her case.

== Cast ==
Actor	Role
Kaori Momoi	Kumako Onizawa
Shima Iwashita	Ritsuko Sahara
Akira Emoto	Shigekazu Akitani
Isuzu Yamada	Tokie Horiuchi
Takeshi Kaga	Katsuo Toyosaki
Norihei Miki	Tamotsu Kinoshita
Jiro Kawarazaki	Detective Kobayashi
Tanie Kitabayashi	Harue Shirakawa
Akiji Kobayashi	Chief of Police, Ishihara
Nenji Kobayashi	Judge Munakata
Akira Nagoya	Iwasaki
Tetsurō Tamba	Okamura

== Awards and nominations ==
7th Hochi Film Award

- Won: Best Actress - Kaori Momoi

== Other adaptations ==
- Giwaku (November 13, 1992) on FUJI TV, starring Ayumi Ishida.
- Giwaku (March 22, 2003) on TV Asahi, starring Kōichi Satō.
- Giwaku (January 24, 2009) on TV Asahi, starring Masakazu Tamura.
- Kokuhatsu Kokusen Bengonin (2011) (8 episodes) on TV Asahi, starring Masakazu Tamura.
- Giwaku (November 9, 2012) on FUJI TV, starring Takako Tokiwa.
- Giwaku (February 3, 2019) on TV Asahi, starring Ryōko Yonekura.
