= Andy Albeck =

American film executive

Andreas Albeck
- Born: September 25, 1921; Vladivostok, Soviet Russia
- Died: September 29, 2010 (aged 89); New York City, US
- Employer: United Artists
- Title: President and CEO
- Spouses: Nelly Stal (divorced) Lotte Jamel (m. 1958)
- Children: 2

Andreas "Andy" Albeck (September 25, 1921 – September 29, 2010) was an American movie executive, who was president and chief executive of United Artists, during a time when it released two films by Woody Allen, along with two films in both the James Bond and Rocky film series. He also oversaw production of Martin Scorsese's Raging Bull, a movie frequently mentioned as one of the films considered the greatest ever, as well as Heaven's Gate, the box office bomb that led to the studio's demise as an independent studio.

== Biography ==
Albeck was born on September 25, 1921, in Vladivostok, Russia. His father was a Danish executive with a shipping firm, while his mother was a Russian escaping the Bolshevik Revolution. His family was taken aboard an American naval vessel to Yokohama, Japan, where Albeck was raised and educated at St. Joseph College. His first connection to the film industry was in 1939, when he became a sales representative for Columbia Pictures in what was then the Dutch East Indies, present day Indonesia. He came to United Artists when the company made the 1951 acquisition of Eagle-Lion Films, the British film company he had been working for.

His first marriage, to Nelly Stal, produced two children, Johannes and Nina. The marriage ended in divorce. In 1958 Albeck remarried Lotte Jamel, whom he had met in 1952 when she had been brought to the United States by her cousin Mickey Marcus, a colonel in the United States Army and Israel's first general. Albeck later had Marcus' experience during World War II and the 1948 Arab–Israeli War made into the 1966 United Artists film Cast a Giant Shadow, starring Kirk Douglas.

Albeck worked his way up through the sales department at United Artists, earning promotions to become president of its broadcasting division and senior vice president of operations. In 1978, Transamerica Corporation chose him to head the studio after its former chairman Arthur B. Krim left with a group of executives to form Orion Pictures, picking Albeck for his ability to control costs and his positive relationship with wary Transamerica executives. Author Steven Bach, who served as head of production at United Artists under Albeck, wrote, "Andy Albeck was not show business; that much was clear," in his book Final Cut.

During his tenure at United Artists, the studio produced The French Lieutenant's Woman starring Meryl Streep, Manhattan and Stardust Memories by director Woody Allen and the James Bond films Moonraker and For Your Eyes Only. Albeck also oversaw two films in the Rocky series, both of which were box office successes. Raging Bull, with Robert De Niro playing the role of Jake LaMotta, was a critical success that went on to be ranked on the American Film Institute's top 100 films of all time. Albeck's undoing was the film Heaven's Gate, which went several times over its original budget and earned little in box office revenue in the wake of overwhelmingly negative reviews, such as by Vincent Canby of The New York Times, who called the film "an unqualified disaster" when it was released in November 1980. In the following weeks Albeck was named chairman of United Artists and removed from his post as president, resigning from the firm in February 1981 in the wake of media reports that he had been forced to retire. In the wake of losses amounting to $44 million, making it what was then the biggest money losing film in history, the studio was purchased in May 1981 by Metro-Goldwyn-Mayer from Transamerica to form MGM/UA in a deal valued at $380 million.

In his retirement, he operated the award-winning Albeck Family Christmas Tree farm in Lafayette Township, New Jersey, growing blue spruce trees on a 200-acre (81 ha) farm. A resident of Manhattan, Albeck died there at the age of 89 on September 29, 2010, at NYU Langone Medical Center due to heart failure. He was survived by his second wife, Lotte, as well as by his son and daughter from his first marriage, six grandchildren and two great-grandchildren.
