= Terumi Niki =

Japanese actress from Tokyo (born 1949)

- 二木 てるみ
- Born: 11 May 1949 (age 77); Tokyo, Japan
- Occupation: Actress

Terumi Niki (二木 てるみ, Niki Terumi; born 11 May 1949) is a Japanese actress from Tokyo. Since a child, she has been a member of the Japanese Theatrical Company Gekidan Wakakusa, of which she has joined in 1953. She played the young girl Otoyo in Akira Kurosawa's Red Beard (1965).

== Selected filmography ==
=== Film ===
- Keisatsu Nikki aka Policeman's Diary (1955)
- Ryūri no Kishi (1956)
- Enraptured (1961)
- Red Beard (1965)
- Karafuto 1945 Summer Hyosetsu no Mon (1974)
- La Seine no Hoshi aka Star of the Seine (1975)
- Gowappa 5 Gōdam (1976)
- Hasami Otoko aka The Man Behind the Scissors (2005)
- Mifune: The Last Samurai (2015)

=== Television ===
- Taikōki (1965), Ohatsu

=== Dubbing ===
- The Diary of Anne Frank, Anne Frank (Millie Perkins)
- To Kill with Intrigue, Ting Chan Yen (Hsu Feng)
