= Red Beard =

- Theatrical release poster
- Directed by: Akira Kurosawa
- Screenplay by: Masato Ide; Hideo Oguni; Ryūzō Kikushima; Akira Kurosawa
- Based on: Akahige Shinryōtan by Shūgorō Yamamoto
- Produced by: Tomoyuki Tanaka; Ryūzō Kikushima
- Starring: Toshiro Mifune; Yūzō Kayama; Reiko Dan; Kyōko Kagawa; Akemi Negishi; Miyuki Kuwano; Tsutomu Yamazaki; Takashi Shimura
- Cinematography: Asakazu Nakai; Takao Saito
- Edited by: Akira Kurosawa
- Music by: Masaru Sato
- Production companies: Kurosawa Productions; Toho
- Distributed by: Toho
- Release dates: April 3, 1965 (roadshow); April 24, 1965 (Japan)
- Running time: 185 minutes
- Country: Japan
- Language: Japanese
- Budget: ¥200–300 million
- Box office: ¥400 million (Japan)

Red Beard (Japanese: 赤ひげ, Hepburn: Akahige) is a 1965 Japanese period drama film co-written, edited, and directed by Akira Kurosawa, in his last collaboration with actor Toshiro Mifune. Based on Shūgorō Yamamoto's 1959 short story collection, Akahige Shinryōtan, the film takes place in Koishikawa, a district of Edo, towards the end of the Tokugawa period (i.e. early or mid-19th century), and is about the relationship between a town doctor and his new trainee. Fyodor Dostoevsky's novel Humiliated and Insulted provided the source for a subplot about a young girl, Otoyo (Terumi Niki), who is rescued from a brothel.

The film looks at the problem of social injustice and explores two of Kurosawa's favorite topics: humanism and existentialism. A few critics have noted the film to be reminiscent in some ways of Ikiru. It is Kurosawa's last black-and-white film. The film was a major box office success in Japan but is known for having caused a rift between Mifune and Kurosawa, with this being the final collaboration between them after working on 16 films together. The film was screened in competition at the 26th Venice International Film Festival. Toshiro Mifune won a Volpi Cup for Best Actor for his performance in the film. It was also nominated for a Golden Globe for Best Foreign Language Film.

== Plot ==
The young and arrogant doctor Noboru Yasumoto, trained in a Dutch medical school in Nagasaki, aspires to the status of personal physician of the Shogunate, a position currently held by a close relative, and expects to progress through the privileged and insulated army structure of medical education. However, for Yasumoto's post-graduate medical training, he is assigned to a rural clinic under the guidance of Dr. Kyojō Niide, known as Akahige ("Red Beard"). Beneath a gruff exterior, Niide is a compassionate and wise clinic director.

Yasumoto is initially livid at his posting, believing that he has little to gain from working under Niide. He assumes that Niide is only interested in seeing Yasumoto's medical notes from Nagasaki, and he rebels against the clinic director. He refuses to see patients or to wear his uniform, disdains the food and spartan environment, and enters a forbidden garden where he meets "The Mantis", a mysterious patient that only Niide can treat. Meanwhile, we learn that Yasumoto's former fiancée, Chigusa, was unfaithful to him, ending their engagement, and generating a disdain in him for romantic relationships.

As Yasumoto struggles to come to terms with his situation, the film tells the story of a few of the clinic's patients. One of them is Rokusuke, a dying man whom Niide discerns is troubled by a secret misery that is only revealed when his desperately unhappy daughter shows up. Another is Sahachi, a well-loved man of the town known for his generosity to his neighbours, who has a tragic connection to his wife, whose corpse is discovered after a landslide. After committing bigamy, she had him unknowingly kill her by asking that he "hold me closer" while hugging, as she surreptitiously held a knife to herself. Niide brings Yasumoto along to rescue a sick twelve-year-old girl, Otoyo, from a brothel (brutally fighting off a local gang of thugs in the process) and then assigns the girl to Yasumoto as his first patient. Through these experiences, Yasumoto begins to humble himself and open his eyes to the world around him.

When Yasumoto himself falls ill, Niide asks Otoyo to nurse him back to health, knowing that caring for Yasumoto will also be part of her own continued healing. Chigusa's younger sister, Masae, visits the clinic to check in on Yasumoto, telling him that his mother is sick and wants him to visit. Through his mother, Yasumoto learns that Chigusa now has a child with her new lover. Masae later makes a kimono for Otoyo and Yasumoto's mother suggests he marry Masae.

Yasumoto begins to understand the magnitude of cruelty and suffering around him, as well as his power to ease that suffering, and learns to regret his vanity and selfishness.

Later, when a local boy, Chōbu, is caught stealing food from the clinic, Otoyo shows him compassion and befriends him, passing on the compassion she received from Niide and Yasumoto. When the brothel's madam comes to the clinic to claim Otoyo and take her back to the brothel, the doctors and clinic staff refuse to let Otoyo go, and chase the madam away. When Chōbu and his destitute family try to escape their misery by taking poison together, the clinic doctors work to save them.

Yasumoto is offered the position of personal physician to the Shogunate he had so coveted. He agrees to marry Masae, but at the wedding announces that he will not accept the new position, but will stay at the clinic, turning down a comfortable and prestigious place in society to continue serving the poor alongside Niide. Surprised by his decision and advising him against it, Niide eventually gives in.

== Cast ==
- Toshiro Mifune as Dr. Kyojō Niide also known as "Red Beard", a rough-tempered yet charitable town doctor and martial artist
- Yūzō Kayama as Dr. Noboru Yasumoto
- Tsutomu Yamazaki as Sahachi
- Yōko Naitō as Masae
- Reiko Dan as Osugi, a nurse
- Miyuki Kuwano as Onaka
- Kyōko Kagawa as "The Mantis", a madwoman
- Tatsuyoshi Ehara as Genzo Tsugawa
- Terumi Niki as Otoyo
- Kamatari Fujiwara as Rokusuke
- Akemi Negishi as Okuni, Rokusuke's daughter
- Yoshitaka Zushi as Chōbu
- Yoshio Tsuchiya as Dr. Handayu Mori
- Eijirō Tōno as Goheiji
- Takashi Shimura as Tokubei Izumiya
- Chishū Ryū as Yasumoto's father
- Kinuyo Tanaka as Yasumoto's mother
- Kōji Mitsui as Heikichi
- Haruko Sugimura as Kin, the madam of a local brothel
- Atsushi Watanabe as Patient B
- Yōko Fujiyama as Chigusa

Cast taken from The Criterion Collection.

== Production ==
=== Writing ===
After finishing High and Low (1963), director Akira Kurosawa accidentally picked up Shūgorō Yamamoto's 1959 novel Akahige Shinryōtan. Although he initially believed it would make a good script for fellow director Hiromichi Horikawa, Kurosawa became so interested in it as he wrote, that he knew he would have to direct it himself. Kurosawa completed writing the script for the film in early July 1963, which he co-wrote with screenwriters Masato Ide, Hideo Oguni, and Ryūzō Kikushima. Kurosawa noted that the script was quite different from the book, specifically mentioning how the young girl main character was not in Yamamoto's novel. With this character, Kurosawa tried to show what Fyodor Dostoevsky showed using the character Nellie in Humiliated and Insulted.

=== Filming ===
Kurosawa and Mifune taking a break on set during filming. This film would be the last collaboration between the two because of Kurosawa's increasingly long production schedules for his films, which required Mifune to turn down many other TV and movie offers.

Principal photography began on December 21, 1963, and wrapped up two years later. Kurosawa got sick twice during filming, while actors Toshiro Mifune and Yūzō Kayama fell ill once each. Mifune would never again work with Kurosawa because the director's increasingly long production schedules required Mifune to turn down too many other TV and movie offers. The set was intended to be as realistic and historically accurate as possible. Film historian Donald Richie wrote that the main set was an entire town with back alleys and side streets, some of which were never even filmed. The materials used were actually about as old as they were supposed to be, with the tiled roofs taken from buildings more than a century old and all of the lumber taken from the oldest available farmhouses. Costumes and props were "aged" for months before being used; the bedding (made in Tokugawa-period patterns) was actually slept in for up to half a year before shooting. The wood used for the main gate was over a hundred years old, and after filming, it was re-erected at the entrance to the theater that hosted Red Beard's premiere.

Richie wrote that one could argue that Kurosawa "completely wasted his million yen set," as the main street is seen for only one minute (although its destruction was incorporated into the earthquake scene). Likewise, the scenes with the bridges and those in the elaborately constructed paddy are also rather brief. However, tourist bus companies did run tours through the set during the two years it took to make Red Beard.

According to Stephen Prince's audio commentary on the Criterion Collection's 2002 DVD, the film was shot at an aspect ratio of 2.35:1, and was Kurosawa's first film to use a magnetic 4-track stereo soundtrack.

== Release ==
Toho was originally slated to release Red Beard during the New Year's holiday season, but it was delayed, forcing producer Tomoyuki Tanaka to produce Ghidorah, the Three-Headed Monster, instead. The film was eventually given a roadshow theatrical release in Japan by Toho on April 3, 1965, and was released throughout Japan on April 24, 1965. The film earned ¥400 million, with ¥361.59 million in distributor rental earnings, making it was one of the highest-grossing Japanese films of 1965. Toho International released the film to theaters in the United States with English subtitles in January 1966, and it was reissued by Frank Lee International in December 1968. In 1978, the film received a theatrical release in France, and sold 200,402 tickets during its theatrical run. The film was screened at the 72nd Venice International Film Festival in 2015.

In 1992, the film was released in the United States on LaserDisc by The Criterion Collection, and on VHS by Media Home Entertainment. The Criterion Collection released the film on DVD in the United States on July 16, 2002. Toho released the film on DVD in Japan on November 21, 2002 and reissued it on February 18, 2015. In 2003, BFI released 'Red Beard' on a Region 2 DVD, with English subtitles. Their copy comes in a box with extensive sleeve notes. In 2014, Madman Entertainment distributed the film on DVD in Region 4.

== Reception ==
=== Critical reception ===
On the review aggregator website Rotten Tomatoes, 75% of 16 critics' reviews are positive, with an average rating of 7.50/10. The film has a score of 4.2/5 on Eiga.com, based on 41 reviews, with 56% of reviewers giving it a 5/5. Metacritic, which uses a weighted average, assigned the film a score of 90 out of 100, based on 10 critics, indicating "universal acclaim".

The film opened to highly positive reviews in Japan, with many calling it one of Kurosawa's best films, and winning the Best Film award by the Japanese film magazine Kinema Junpo. However, the film received a mixed response from Western audiences; while it was a box-office success in Japan, it performed poorly abroad.

Roger Ebert gave the film four stars in a review dated December 26, 1969, writing "Akira Kurosawa's Red Beard is assembled with the complexity and depth of a good 19th century novel, and it's a pleasure, in a time of stylishly fragmented films, to watch a director taking the time to fully develop his characters." Michael Sragow of The New Yorker wrote "This 1965 film, the last of Akira Kurosawa's collaboration with Toshiro Mifune, is often derided as a soap opera. But the story of a grizzled nineteenth-century doctor nicknamed Red Beard (Mifune) and his green physician (Yuzo Kayama) who learns human medical values from him is actually a masterpiece."

=== Accolades ===
Award	Year	Category	Recipient(s)	Result	Ref(s)
Venice International Film Festival Awards	1965	Golden Lion		Nominated	
Venice International Film Festival Awards	1965	Volpi Cup for Best Actor	Toshiro Mifune	Won	
Venice International Film Festival Awards	1965	San Giorgio Prize		Won	
Venice International Film Festival Awards	1965	International Catholic Film Secretariat Award		Won	
Golden Globe Awards	1965	Best Foreign Language Film		Nominated	
Moscow International Film Festival Awards	1965	Soviet Filmmakers Alliance Award		Won	
Blue Ribbon Awards	1965	Best Picture		Won	
Blue Ribbon Awards	1965	Best Actor	Toshiro Mifune	Won	
Blue Ribbon Awards	1965	Supporting Actress	Terumi Niki	Won	
Silver Frames Awards	1967	Foreign Film Actor Award	Toshiro Mifune	Won	
Mainichi Film Awards	1980	Japan Film Awards		Won	
Mainichi Film Awards	1980	Starring Actor Award	Toshiro Mifune	Won	
Kinema Junpo Awards	1980	Japan Film Director Award	Akira Kurosawa	Won	
