= Seichō Matsumoto =

Japanese detective fiction writer (1909–1992)

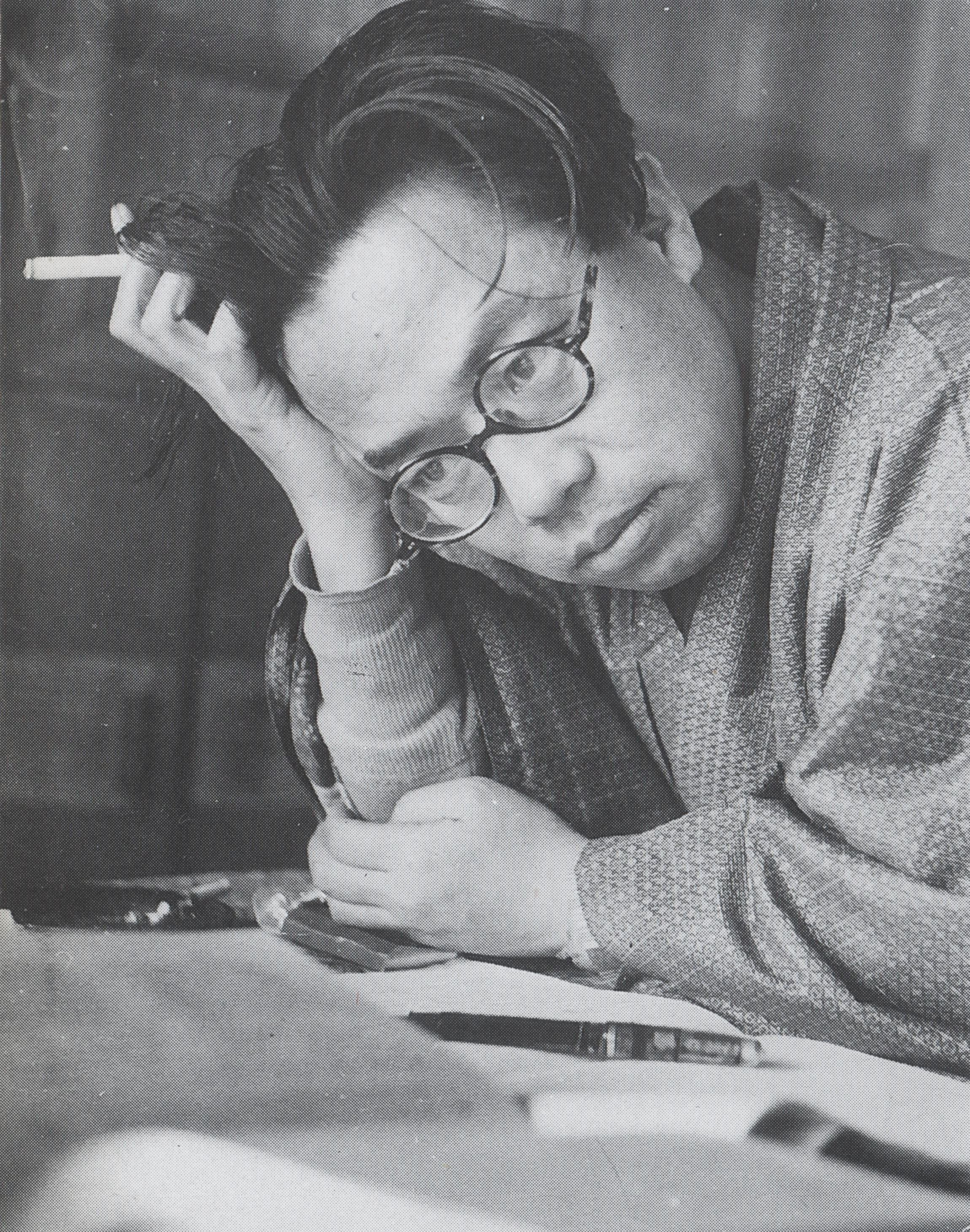
- Seichō Matsumoto in 1955
- Born: Kiyoharu Matsumoto; December 21, 1909; Fukuoka, Japan
- Died: August 4, 1992 (aged 82); Tokyo Women's Medical University Hospital
- Occupation: Writer
- Writing career
- Genres: Detective fiction Social mystery non-fiction Ancient history

Seichō Matsumoto (松本 清張, Matsumoto Seichō; Japanese pronunciation: [mä̀.t͡sɨ́.mó̞.tó̞ (|) sé̞ì.c̟͡ɕò̞ò̞, -sé̞è̞-]; December 21, 1909 – August 4, 1992; born Kiyoharu Matsumoto) was a Japanese writer, credited with popularizing detective fiction in Japan.

Matsumoto's works broke new ground by incorporating elements of human psychology and ordinary life. His works often reflect a wider social context and postwar nihilism that expanded the scope and further darkened the atmosphere of the genre. His exposé of corruption among police officials and criminals was a new addition to the field. The subject of investigation was not just the crime but also the society affected.

Although Matsumoto was a self-educated prolific author, his first book was not printed until he was in his forties. In the following 40 years, he published more than 450 works. Matsumoto's work included historical novels and non-fiction, but it was his mystery and detective fiction that solidified his reputation as a writer internationally.

Credited with popularizing the genre among readers in his country, Matsumoto became Japan's best-selling and highest earning author in the 1960s. His most acclaimed detective novels, including Ten to sen (1958; Points and Lines, 1970); Suna no utsuwa (1961; Inspector Imanishi Investigates, 1989) and Kiri no hata (1961; Pro Bono, 2012), have been translated into a number of languages, including English. He received the Akutagawa Prize in 1952, the Kikuchi Kan Prize in 1970, and the Mystery Writers of Japan Award in 1957. He served as president of the Mystery Writers of Japan from 1963 to 1971.

Matsumoto also collaborated with film director Yoshitarō Nomura on adaptations of eight of his novels to film, including Castle of Sand.

== Early life ==
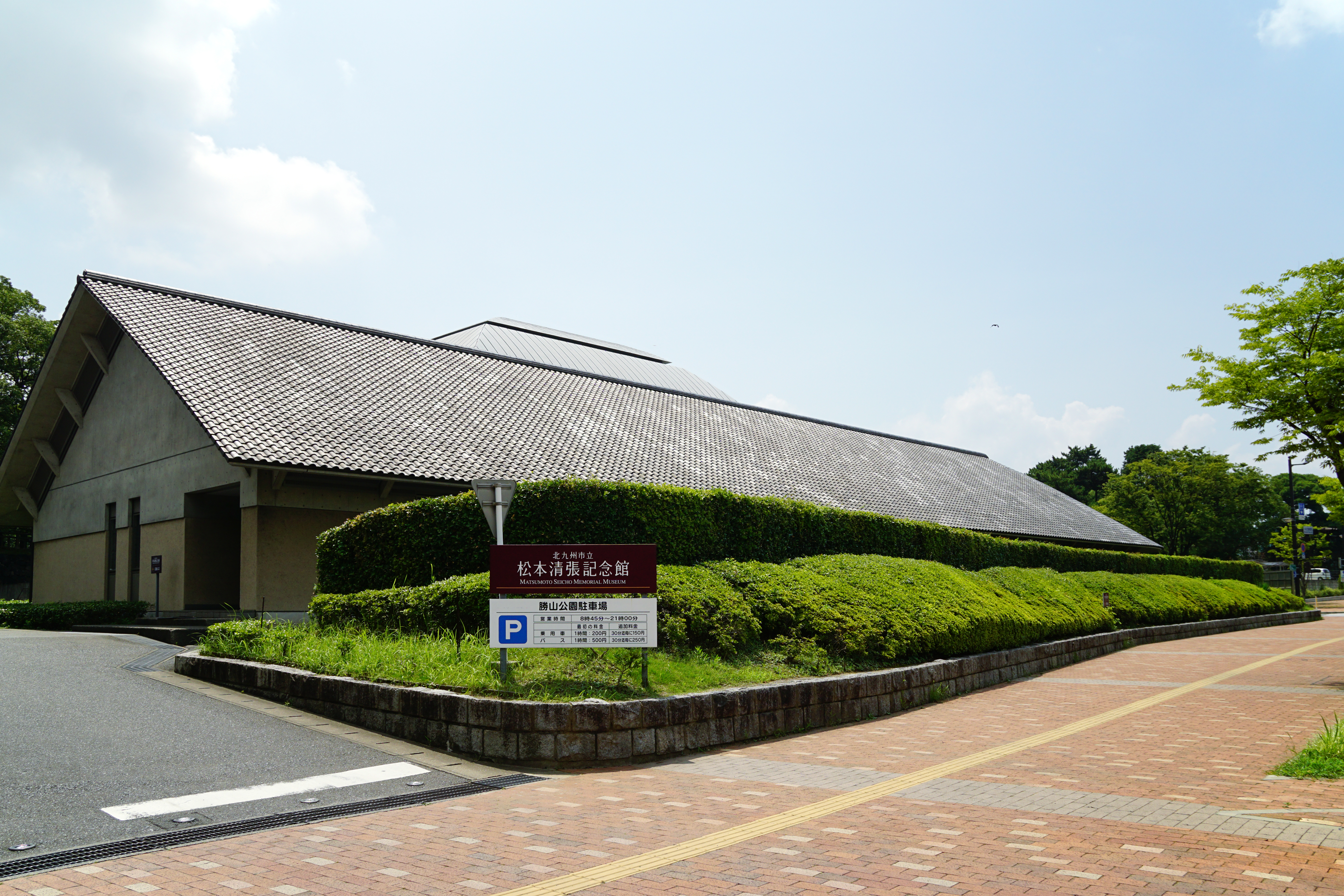
Matsumoto Seicho Memorial Museum (Kokura)

Matsumoto was born in the city of Kokura, now Kokura Kita ward, Kitakyushu, Fukuoka prefecture, Kyushu, in 1909. His real name was Kiyoharu Matsumoto before he adopted the pen name Seichō Matsumoto; "Seichō" is the Sino-Japanese reading of the characters of his given name. He was an only child. After graduating from elementary school, Seichō was hired at a utility company. As an adult he designed layouts for the Asahi Shimbun in Kyushu. His work in the advertising department was interrupted by serving in World War II as a medical corpsman. He spent much of the war in Korea before resuming work at the Asahi Shimbun after the war. He transferred to the Tokyo office in 1950.

Although Matsumoto attended neither secondary school nor university, he was well-educated. As a rebellious teenager, he had read banned revolutionary texts as part of a political protest, which enraged Seichō's father, causing him to destroy his son's collection of literature. Matsumoto sought award-winning works of fiction and studied them. His official foray into literature occurred in 1950 when the magazine Shukan Asahi hosted a fiction contest. He submitted his short story "Saigō satsu" (Saigō's Currency) and placed third in the competition. Within six years he had retired from his post at the newspaper to pursue a full-time career as a writer.

== Writing career ==
Matsumoto wrote short fiction while simultaneously producing multiple novels, at one point as many as five concurrently, in the form of magazine serials. Many of his crime stories debuted in periodicals, among them "Harikomi" (The Chase), in which a woman reunites with her fugitive lover while police close in on them.

For his literary accomplishments, Matsumoto received the Mystery Writers of Japan Prize, Kikuchi Kan Prize, and the Yoshikawa Eiji Prize for Literature. In 1952 he was awarded the Akutagawa Prize for "Aru 'Kokura-nikki' den" (The Legend of the Kokura-Diary).

As a lifelong activist, Matsumoto voiced both anti-American and anti-Japanese sentiments in some of his writings. For example at the height of the 1960 Anpo protests, Matsumoto tapped into the anti-American mood with his notorious work of "non-fiction" Black Fog over Japan (日本の黒い霧, Nihon no kuroi kiri), in which an enterprising detective uncovers a vast conspiracy by American secret agents that ties together many famous incidents and unsolved crimes of the postwar period. Likewise, many of Matsumoto's works of fiction and nonfiction revealed various aspects of home-grown corruption in the Japanese system. In 1968 he traveled to communist Cuba as a delegate of the World Cultural Congress and ventured to North Vietnam to meet with its president later that same year.

Matsumoto was also interested in archeology and ancient history. He made his ideas public in his fiction and in many essays. His interest extended to Northeast Asia, the Western Regions, and the Celts.

A novel was written by Seichō Matsumoto based on the true events in the Kokura incident where US troops raped Japanese women on 11 July 1950. Duchess Harris wrote an essay “How negative stereotypes in material culture impact global politics”, criticising Matsumoto's novelisation for focusing on race in the incident, saying “The image of the Black GI as rapist has become something of a staple in Japanese pornography and films about the Occupation. The Black rapist trope also appears in Matsumoto Seicho’s short story, Kuroji no e.” Others also criticised his racial focus.

== International recognition ==
In 1977, Matsumoto met Ellery Queen when they visited Japan. In 1987, he was invited by French mystery writers to talk about his sense of mystery at Grenoble.

Matsumoto died from cancer at the age of 82.

== Awards ==
- 1953 – Akutagawa Prize: Aru 'Kokura-nikki' den (The Legend of the Kokura-Diary)
- 1957 – Mystery Writers of Japan Award: Kao (The Face) (short story collection)
- 1967 – Yoshikawa Eiji Prize for Literature
- 1970 – Kikuchi Kan Prize
- 1990 – Asahi Prize

== Works ==
=== Novels ===
- Points and Lines (点と線), Ten to Sen, 1958) (English translation: Tokyo Express)
- Walls of Eyes (ja:眼の壁, Me no Kabe, 1958)
- The Pale Track (ja:蒼い描点, Aoi Byōten, 1959)
- Zero Focus (ja:ゼロの焦点, Zero no Shōten, 1959) (English translation: Point Zero)
- Black Forest (ja:黒い樹海, Kuroi Jukai, 1960)
- Tower of Waves (ja:波の塔, Nami no Tou, 1960)
- Pro Bono (ja:霧の旗, Kiri no Hata, 1961)
- Shadow Area (ja:影の地帯, Kage no Chitai, 1961)
- Inspector Imanishi Investigates (砂の器, Suna no Utsuwa, 1961)
- Bad Sorts (ja:わるいやつら, Warui Yatsura, 1961)
- Dark Gospel (ja:黒い福音, Kuroi Fukuin, 1961) (English translation: Twilight in Musashino)
- The Globular Wilderness (ja:球形の荒野, Kyūkei no Kōya, 1962)
- Manners and Customs at time (ja:時間の習俗, Jikan no Shūzoku, 1962)
- Beast Alley (ja:けものみち, Kemono-Michi, 1964)
- Grass Inscription (ja:草の陰刻, Kusa no Inkoku, 1965)
- The Complex of D (ja:Dの複合, D no Fukugō, 1968)
- Mighty Ant (ja:強き蟻, Tsuyoki Ari, 1971)
- A Quiet Place (ja:聞かなかった場所, Kikanakatta Basho, 1971)
- Far Approach (ja:遠い接近, Tōi Sekkin, 1972)
- Fire Street between Ancient Persia and Japan (ja:火の路, Hi no Michi, 1975)
- Glass Castle (ja:ガラスの城, Garasu no Shiro, 1976)
- The Passed Scene (ja:渡された場面, Watasareta Bamen, 1976)
- Vortex (ja:渦, Uzu, 1977)
- Empty City (ja:空の城, Kū no Shiro, 1978)
- Pocketbook of Black Leather (ja:黒革の手帖, Kurokawa no Techō, 1980)
- The Magician in Nara Period (ja:眩人, Genjin, 1980)
- Night Light Stairs (ja:夜光の階段, Yakou no Kaidan, 1981)
- Death Delivery (ja:死の発送, Shi no Hassō, 1982)
- Street of Desire (ja:彩り河, Irodorigawa, 1983)
- Straying Map (ja:迷走地図, Meisou Chizu, 1983)
- Hot Silk (ja:熱い絹, Atsui Kinu, 1985)
- Foggy Conference (ja:霧の会議, Kiri no Kaigi, 1987)
- Black Sky (ja:黒い空, Kuroi Sora, 1988)
- Madness of gods (ja:神々の乱心, Kamigami no Ranshin, 1997)

=== Short stories ===
- Saigō's Currency (ja:西郷札, Saigō satsu, 1951)
- The Legend of the Kokura-Diary (ja:或る「小倉日記」伝, Aru "Kokura-nikki" den, 1952)
- The Face (ja:顔, Kao, 1955)
- The Voice (ja:声, Koe, 1955)
- The Stakeout (ja:張込み, Harikomi, 1955)
- The Woman who Took the Local Paper [aka The Serial] (ja:地方紙を買う女, Chihōshi o Kau Onna, 1957)
- Wait a Year and a Half [aka Just Eighteen Months] (ja:一年半待て, Ichinenhan Mate, 1957)
- The Demon (ja:鬼畜, Kichiku, 1958)
- Amagi-Pass (ja:天城越え, Amagi Goe, 1958)
- The Finger (ja:指, Yubi, 1969)
- Suspicion (ja:疑惑, Giwaku, 1982)

=== Japanese modern history ===
- Black Fog over Japan (ja:日本の黒い霧, Nihon-no Kuroi Kiri, 1960)
- Unearthing the Shōwa Period (ja:昭和史発掘, Shōwa-shi Hakkutsu, 1965–1972)
- Essay of Ikki Kita (北一輝論, Kita Ikki Ron, 1976)
- February 26 Incident (二・二六事件, Ni-niroku Jiken, 1986–1993)

=== Ancient history ===
- Essay of Yamataikoku (ja:古代史疑, Kodai-shi-gi, 1968)
- Japanese Ancient History by Seichō (ja:清張通史, Seichō Tsūshi, 1976–1983)
- From Persepolis to Asuka, Yamato (ja:ペルセポリスから飛鳥へ, Peruseporisu kara Asuka e, 1979)

=== English translations ===
==== Novels ====
- Points and Lines (original title: Ten to Sen) trans. Makiko Yamamoto and Paul C. Blum (Kodansha International, 1970)
- Inspector Imanishi Investigates (original title: Suna no Utsuwa) trans. Beth Cary (New York, Soho Press, 2003, ISBN 9781569470190; London, Penguin Books, 2025, ISBN 9780241724439)
- Pro Bono (original title: Kiri no Hata), trans. Andrew Clare (New York, Vertical, 2012, ISBN 978-1-934287-02-6)
- A Quiet Place (original title: Kikanakatta Basho), trans. Louise Heal Kawai (London, Bitter Lemon Press, 2016, ISBN 9781908524638 (hbk); London, Penguin Books, 2025, ISBN 9780241744208, (pbk))
- Point Zero (original title: Zero no shōten) trans. Louise Heal Kawai (London, Bitter Lemon Press, 2024, ISBN 9781913394936)
- Tokyo Express (original title: Ten to Sen) (Note: Retranslation) trans. Jesse Kirkwood (London, Penguin Books, 2023, ISBN 9780241439081)
- Suspicion (original short story title: Giwaku) trans. Jesse Kirkwood (London, Penguin Books, 2025, ISBN 9780241756409)

==== Short story collection ====
- The Voice and Other Stories
  - "The Accomplice" (original title: Kyōhansha)
  - "The Face" (original title: Kao)
  - "The Serial" (original title: Chihōshi o Kau Onna)
  - "Beyond All Suspicion" (original title: Sōsa Kengai no Jōken)
  - "The Voice" (original title: Koe)
  - "The Woman Who Wrote Haiku" (original title: Kantō-ku no Onna)

==== Short stories ====
- "The Cooperative Defendant" (original title: Kimyō na Hikoku)
  - Ellery Queen's Japanese Golden Dozen: The Detective Story World in Japan (Edited by Ellery Queen. Charles E. Tuttle Company, 1978)
  - Classic Short Stories of Crime and Detection (Garland, 1983)
  - The Oxford Book of Detective Stories (Oxford University Press, 2000)
- "The Woman Who Took the Local Paper" (original title: Chihōshi o Kau Onna)
  - Ellery Queen's Mystery Magazine, June 1979
  - Ellery Queen's Crime Cruise Round the World: 26 Stories from Ellery Queen's Mystery Magazine (Dial Press, 1981)
  - Murder in Japan: Japanese Stories of Crime and Detection (Dembner Books, 1987)
- "The Secret Alibi" (original title: Shōgen)
  - Ellery Queen's Mystery Magazine, November 1980
  - Murder in Japan: Japanese Stories of Crime and Detection (Dembner Books, 1987)
- "The Humble Coin"
  - Ellery Queen's Mystery Magazine, July 1982
- "Just Eighteen Months" (aka "Wait a Year and a Half") (original title: Ichi Nen Han Mate)
  - "Just Eighteen Months": Ellery Queen's Prime Crimes (Davis Publications, 1983)
  - "Wait a Year and a Half": The Mother of Dreams and Other Short Stories (Kodansha America, 1986)
  - "Wait a Year and a Half": Japanese Short Stories (Folio Society, 2000)
- "Beyond All Suspicion" (original title: Sōsa Kengai no Jōken)
  - Ellery Queen's Mystery Magazine, January 1991
- "The Stakeout" (original title: Harikomi)
  - The Columbia Anthology of Modern Japanese Literature: Volume 2: From 1945 to the Present (Columbia University Press, 2007)

== Film adaptations ==
- Stakeout (1958) directed by Yoshitarō Nomura
- Voice Without a Shadow (1958) directed by Seijun Suzuki
- Points and Lines (1958) directed by Tsuneo Kobayashi
- The Lost Alibi (1960) directed by Hiromichi Horikawa
- Black Sea Of Trees (1960) directed by Haruo Harada
- Death On The Mountain (1961) directed by Toshio Sugie
- Zero Focus (1961) directed by Yoshitarō Nomura
- Kiri no Hata (1965) directed by Yoji Yamada
- The Shadow Within (1970) directed by Yoshitarō Nomura
- Cross-Currents (1970) directed by Yusuku Watanabe
- Castle of Sand (1974) directed by Yoshitarō Nomura
- The Demon (1978) directed by Yoshitarō Nomura
- Suspicion (1982) directed by Yoshitarō Nomura
- Amagi Pass (1983) directed by Haruhiko Mimura

== See also ==
- Japanese detective fiction
