= Points and Lines =

Novel by Seichō Matsumoto

- 1970 edition
- Author: Seichō Matsumoto
- Original title: Ten to Sen (点と線)
- Language: Japanese
- Genre: Detective fiction, Social mystery
- Publication date: 1958
- Publication place: Japan

Points and Lines (Japanese: 点と線, Hepburn: Ten to Sen), is a novel by Seichō Matsumoto, published in 1958. It was initially serialized, and first translated into English by Makiko Yamamoto and Paul C. Blum, published by Kodansha International in 1970. A new translation by Jesse Kirkwood was released as Tokyo Express by Penguin Classics in 2022. Points and Lines was Matsumoto's first published novel.

== Plot ==
The novel starts with a Tatsuo Yasuda, a businessman with several connections in a government ministry currently being investigated for corruption, inviting two waitresses from a restaurant he frequents for dinner. At the train station where they see him off, the waitresses notice their coworker, Toki, boarding the Asakaze with what they believe is her lover.

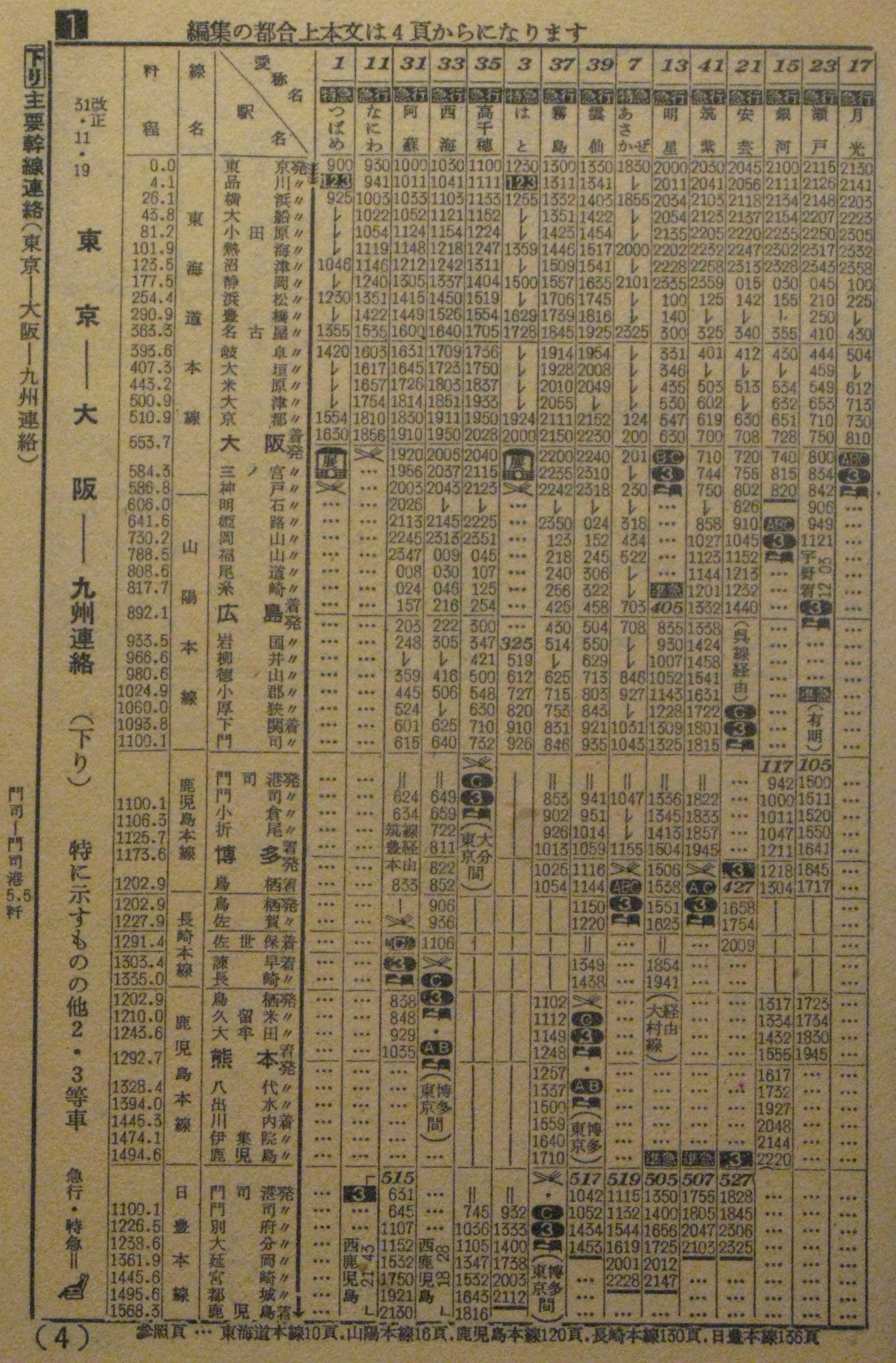
A train timetable from when the novel was published, and a key aspect of the plot.

Around a week later, two bodies are discovered at a beach in Kashii. Officers identify the victims as Toki and Sayama, a key witness who worked at the government ministry being investigated, and conclude it was a double suicide between two lovers. Veteran detective Shigetaro Torikai suspects foul play and investigates on his own, finding good reason for his suspicions, but is halted by his superiors.

Detective Mihara Kiichi, whose department is currently investigating the corruption scandal, arrives from Tokyo to Fukoka to investigate. The novel carries on from his perspective as he meets with Yasuda, his bedridden wife Ryoko, and traces the train, ferry, and plane routes that make up his alibi.

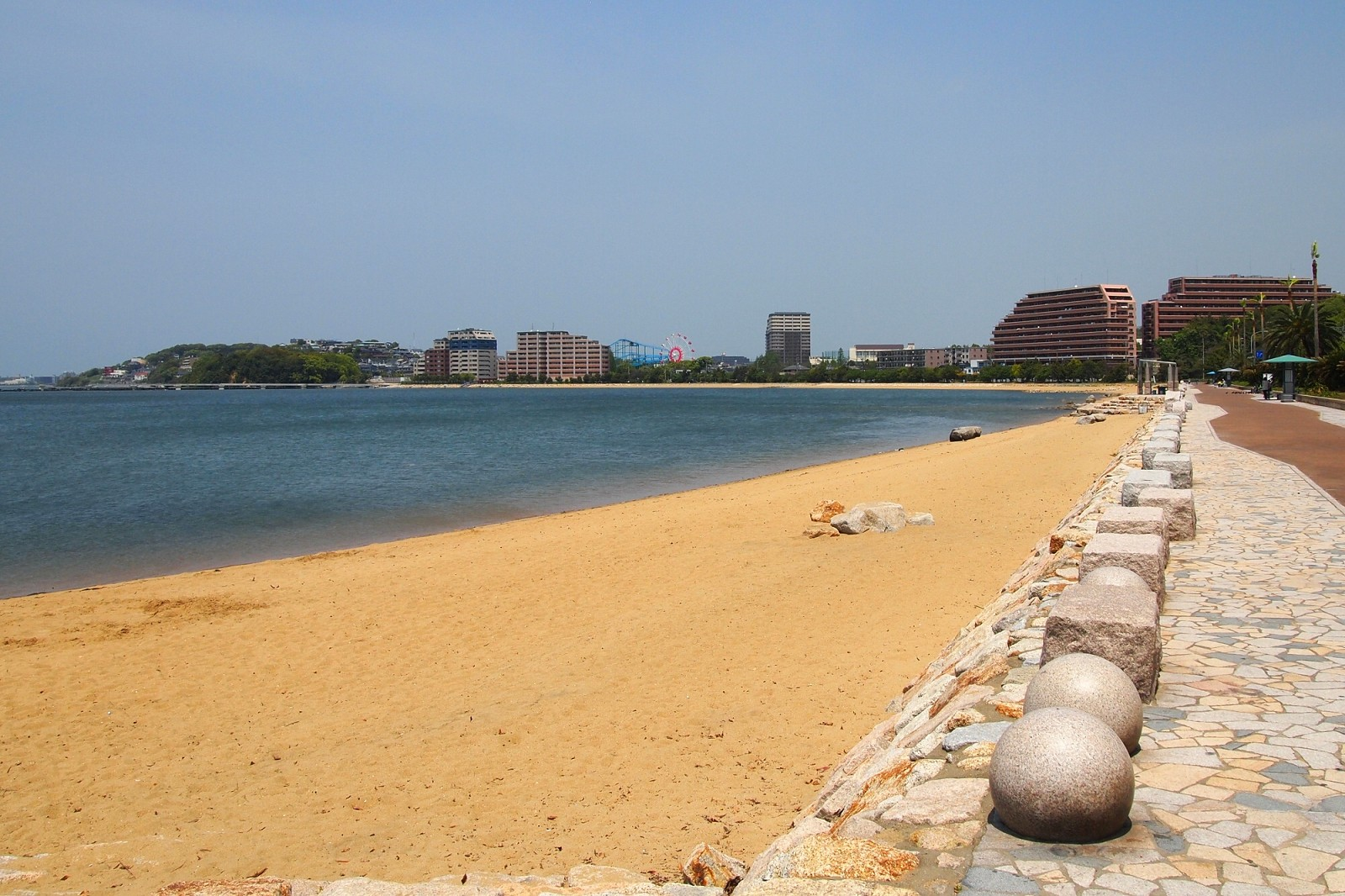
Kashii beach in 2011, near where the murder took place.

The novel ends with Kiichi writing a letter to Torikai, explaining how Yasuda had colluded with a senior in the government ministry to kill Sayama and prevent him from incriminating them. Yasuda and Ryoko had poisoned Toki, revealed to be Yasuda’s mistress, and Sayama separately, then arranged their bodies together in order to make their deaths appear to be a suicide instead. Kiichi laments that Ryoko and Yasuda committed suicide before they could be arrested, and no evidence was left behind to arrest the senior government minister who colluded with them.

== Reception ==
Points and Lines was Matsumoto's first novel, and is often considered his finest work. The novel's themes reflect his left-wing ideals and the trepidation of post-war Japan, exploring government corruption and the limits of justice through Japan's efficient transit system as a symbol of progress.

Writing for World Literature Today, J. Madison Davis named it among the ten greatest crime novels of all time.

It was made into a movie by Toei Company in 1958 and a TV drama in 2007.
