= Suna no Utsuwa (TV series) =

- Also known as: Vessel of Sand
- Starring: Masahiro Nakai; Ken Watanabe; Yasuko Matsuyuki; Kotomi Kyono
- Theme music composer: Akira Senju
- Country of origin: Japan
- Original language: Japanese
- No. of episodes: 11

Original release
- Network: TBS
- Release: January 18 – March 28, 2004

Vessel of Sand (砂の器, Suna no Utsuwa) is a 2004 Japanese television drama series. It is based on a Japanese novel Suna no Utsuwa.

== Cast ==
- Masahiro Nakai as Eiryo Waga/Hideo Motoura
- Ken Watanabe as Shuichiro Imanishi (named Eitaro Imanishi in the original book)
- Yasuko Matsuyuki as Asami Naruse (Rieko Naruse)
- Masaru Nagai as Masaya Yoshimura (Hiroshi Yoshimura)
- Shinji Takeda as Keisuke Sekigawa (Shigeo Sekigawa)
- Kotomi Kyono as Ayaka Tadokoro (Sachiko Tadokoro)
- Yoshinori Okada as Makoto Miyata (Kunio Miyata)
- Hitomi Satō as Reiko Ogihara (Emiko Miura)
- Yoko Moriguchi as Junko Imanishi
- Hidekazu Akai as Kenichi Miki
- Masachika Ichimura as Yuzuru Aso (gender flipped from Akiko Sugiura)
- Isao Natsuyagi as Shigeyoshi Tadokoro
- Yoshio Harada as Chiyokichi Motoura

== Awards ==
7th Nikkan Sports Drama Grand Prix

- Won: Best Drama
- Won: Best Actor - Masahiro Nakai
