= Malcolm Payne =

English social work academic

- Born: 13 June 1947 (age 79)

Academic work
- Discipline: Social work
- Notable works: Modern social work theory

Malcolm Payne (born 13 June 1947), is a retired English academic and writer in the field of social work. He is best known for his Modern social work theory textbook, which is in its fourth edition. He is an Adviser (Policy and Development) at St Christophers Hospice, London, Emeritus Professor of Community Studies, Manchester Metropolitan University, and Honorary Professor, Kingston University St Georges Medical School. He was made an honorary Fellow of the University of Chichester in 2005.

== Books ==
- Payne, Malcolm (1982). Working in teams. London: Macmillan. ISBN 9780333308875.
- (1993) Search: the social services and community care consultancy and training directory, 1993-4 . In BASW Trading.
- Payne M (1993) Linkages: effective networking in social care . In Whiting and Birch.
- Payne, Malcolm; Campling, Jo (1995). Social work and community care. Basingstoke: Macmillan. ISBN 9780333606247.
- Payne, Malcolm (1986). Social care in the community. Basingstoke: Macmillan Education. ISBN 9780333363195.
- Payne, Malcolm (1993). Linkages: effective networking in social care. London: Whiting and Birch. ISBN 9781871177343.
- Payne, Malcolm (1997). Writing for publication in social services journals (3rd ed.). Chicago: Whiting and Birch. ISBN 9781861770202.
- Payne, Malcolm (1997). Writing for publication in social services journals (3rd ed.). Chicago: Whiting and Birch. ISBN 9781861770202.
- Payne, Malcolm (1997). Modern social work theory (2nd ed.). Chicago, Illinois: Lyceum Books. ISBN 9780925065155.
- Payne, Malcolm; Shardlow, Steven (1998). Contemporary issues in social work: Western Europe. Aldershot, Hants, England Brookfield, Vermont: Arena Ashgate Pub. Co. ISBN 9781857424270.
- Payne, Malcolm (2000). Teamwork in multiprofessional care. Basingstoke: Macmillan. ISBN 9780333729779.
- Payne, Malcolm (2000). Teamwork in multiprofessional care. Chicago, Ill: Lyceum Books. ISBN 9780925065360.
- Payne, Malcolm (2000). Anti-bureaucratic social work. Birmingham: Venture Press. ISBN 9781861780409.
- Payne, Malcolm; Shardlow, Steven M. (2002). Social work in the British Isles. London Philadelphia, Pennsylvania: Jessica Kingsley Publishers. ISBN 9781417533107.
- Payne, Malcolm; Adams, Robert; Dominelli, Lena (2002). Critical practice in social work. Basingstoke: Palgrave. ISBN 9780333925539.
- Payne, Malcolm (2005). The origins of social work: continuity and change. Houndmills, Basingstoke, Hampshire New York: Palgrave Macmillan. ISBN 9780333737910.
- Payne, Malcolm; Adams, Robert; Dominelli, Lena (2005). Social work futures: crossing boundaries, transforming practice. Houndmills, Basingstoke, Hampshire New York: Palgrave Macmillan. ISBN 9781403916143.
- Payne, Malcolm (2007). What is professional social work. Chicago, Illinois: Lyceum Books. ISBN 9780925065995.
- Payne, Malcolm; Hartley, Nigel (2008). The creative arts in palliative care. London Philadelphia: Jessica Kingsley. ISBN 9781281782342.
- Payne, Malcolm; Askeland, Gurid Aga (2008). Globalization and international social work postmodern change and challenge. Aldershot, England Burlington, Vermont: Ashgate. ISBN 9780754689492.
- Payne, Malcolm; Adams, Robert; Dominelli, Lena (2009). Social work: themes, issues and critical debates (3rd ed.). Basingstoke England New York: Palgrave Macmillan. ISBN 9780230218659.
- Payne, Malcolm; Reith, Margaret (2009). Social work in end-of-life and palliative care. Chicago, Illinois: Lyceum Books. ISBN 9781933478586.
- Payne, Malcolm (2009). Social care practice in context. Basingstoke England New York: Palgrave Macmillan. ISBN 9780230521810.
- Payne, Malcolm; Adams, Robert; Dominelli, Lena (2009). Practising social work in a complex world. Basingstoke England New York: Palgrave Macmillan. ISBN 9780230218642.
- Payne, Malcolm; Adams, Robert; Dominelli, Lena (2009). Critical practice in social work. Basingstoke England New York: Palgrave Macmillan. ISBN 9780230218635.
- Payne, Malcolm (2011). Humanistic social work: core principles in practice. Chicago, Illinois: Lyceum Books. ISBN 9781933478302.
- Payne, Malcolm (2012). Citizenship social work with older people. Chicago, Illinois: Lyceum Books. ISBN 9781935871088.
- Payne, Malcolm (2014). Modern social work theory (4th ed.). Basingstoke: Palgrave Macmillan. ISBN 9780230249608.
