= Social mystery =

Subgenre of mystery fiction

The social mystery (社会派推理小説, shakaiha suiri shōsetsu) is a subgenre of mystery fiction, especially in Japan, which was established in the 1960s by works of Seichō Matsumoto. In general, this genre focuses on social issues in the manner of social realism. It pursues the context of a crime in addition to the crime itself. Main thesis of the social mystery is whydunit, rather than whodunit.

Social mystery tends to contrast with the classical whodunit (本格派推理小説, honkakuha suiri shōsetsu), which focuses on solving puzzles and breaking alibi. However, they are not completely independent, because it is not impossible to deal with social issues and puzzle solving in one work.

The works that reflect social context are not uncommon among mysteries from other countries. But it is a characteristic phenomenon in Japan to give such works a title as a separate subgenre.

== Style ==
Although shakai stories are intended to be more realistic than honkaku mysteries, that is not their sole defining trait. The purpose of emphasizing reality in a shakai story is to bring the social implications of crime to the forefront of the story, and therefore the realism present is in service of that goal. In fact, while there is a rivalry on the surface between the shakai and honkaku schools, it has become commonplace to mix and match elements of both varieties in order to create stories that are both satisfying as puzzles and grounded crime stories. Keigo Higashino is a famous master of this synthesized style.

While the shakai school involves realistic variants on honkaku puzzle stories, it also differentiates itself with stories that are contrary to the conventions of honkaku fiction. In other words, the shakai school also contains realistic takes on the henkaku school of detective fiction. This includes styles informed by the Western tradition of hardboiled stories, where crime is a psychologically traumatic dilemma, and cynicism towards the legal system informs a darker style of characterization. However, the shakai variant of hardboiled stories remains distinct from its Western counterpart.

A distinguishing character of the Japanese shakai school is the influence of Japanese horror on all Japanese crime writing. Although the emphasis on realism precludes the shakai school from having genuinely supernatural crimes, the psychological and aesthetics trappings of horror have produced a genre that is easy to distinguish from the Western hardboiled genre and other realistic crime stories. Serial killings and bizarre crimes are particularly common motifs in these kinds of shakai stories.

== History ==
Although different from today's social mystery fiction works, attempts to introduce social themes into detective fiction have existed since the pre-war period. In 1935, Edogawa Ranpo referred to works by Hayashi Fusao, Hirabayashi Taiko, and proletarian writer Hayama Yoshiki as “social detective fiction (社会的探偵小説, shakaiteki tantei shōsetsu)”.

In the post-war period, Udaru Ōshita wrote The Illusion (1955).

=== Seichō Revolution and the birth of a subgenre ===
It is unclear where the term or catchphrase “social mystery” originated. Nakajima Kawataro cites a 1960 newspaper article by Ara Masahito as the source. And in 1961, Seichō Matsumoto used the phrase “a group of works called so-called ‘social school’ or something like that,” suggesting that by this time it had already become a common term. In 1958, since Matsumoto's Points and Lines (点と線, ten to sen) and The Wall of Eyes (眼の壁, me no kabe) were published and became bestsellers, a large number of mysteries influenced by Matsumoto's style were published. Thus it seems that the term “social mystery” was coined and recognised as an independent subgenre.

In 1961, Tsutomu Mizukami published The Tusk of the Sea (海の牙, umi no kiba), and won the Mystery Writers of Japan Award. In 1963, Mizukami published The Starvation straits (飢餓海峡, kiga kaikyō), and was recognised as a social mystery writer. Kuroiwa Jūgo, Arima Yorichika, and others also published many social mystery works.

The rise of realistic social mystery shook the Japanese high literature circle, and even led to the literary fiction controversy of 1961: “What is literary fiction and what is genre fiction?”, as Ken Hirano raised the issue.

However, as the mass media became abuzz with the social mystery, vulgar social criticism fictions that did not have the conditions of being mystery or detective fiction were overwhelmingly published under the pretense of social mystery. As a result, the social mystery boom waned in the mid-1960s, and Matsumoto also criticised the excessive fashion.

=== Since the 1980s: new generations of social mystery ===
The 1980s saw the rise of the neo-classical whodunit (新本格派, shin honkakuha), a revival attempt of the classical whodunit in reaction to the realist orientation of the social mystery. Meanwhile, the social mystery genre was also revitalised by the emergence of a new generation of writers from the 1980s to 1990s.

Miyuki Miyabe, who claims to be the spiritual eldest daughter of Seichō Matsumoto, made her debut in 1987 and has continued to publish social mystery novels, most notably All She Was Worth (火車, kasha) and Reason (理由, riyū), winner of the Naoki Prize.

Natsuo Kirino's debut novel was a hard-boiled, but she wrote many social mysteries. Out (アウト, auto) won the ‘This Mystery is Excellent!’ 1st place and the Mystery Writers of Japan Award. Kirino's novels thoroughly dissect the dark side of Japanese society, depicting disturbing and eerie criminals and detectives.

Originally a neo-classical whodunit writer, Higashino Keigo became also known as a social mystery writer in 1999 with the publication of Journey Under the Midnight Sun (白夜行, Byakuyakō), and has since published both neo-classical and social mystery works.
