= Castle of Sand =

- Original Japanese poster art
- Directed by: Yoshitarō Nomura
- Written by: Yoshitarō Nomura; Shinobu Hashimoto; Yōji Yamada
- Based on: Suna no Utsuwa by Seicho Matsumoto
- Produced by: Shinobu Hashimoto; Yoshihara Mishima; Masayuki Sato
- Starring: Tetsuro Tamba; Go Kato; Kensaku Morita; Yoko Shimada; Karin Yamaguchi; Shin Saburi; Ken Ogata; Kiyoshi Atsumi
- Cinematography: Takashi Kawamata
- Edited by: Kazuo Ôta
- Music by: Yasushi Akutagawa
- Distributed by: Shochiku
- Release date: October 19, 1974 (Japan)
- Running time: 143 minutes
- Country: Japan
- Language: Japanese

Castle of Sand (Japanese: 砂の器, Hepburn: Suna no Utsuwa), alternatively The Castle of Sand, is a 1974 Japanese police procedural neo-noir film directed by Yoshitarō Nomura, based on the novel Suna no Utsuwa by Seicho Matsumoto.

== Plot ==
The film tells the tale of two detectives, Imanishi (Tetsuro Tamba) and Yoshimura (Kensaku Morita), tasked with tracking down the murderer of an old man, found bludgeoned to death in a rail yard. When the identity of the old man can't be determined, the investigation focuses on the only other clue: a scrap of conversation overheard at a bar between the old man and a younger one. A witness recalls the cryptic phrases "Kameda did this" and "Kameda doesn't change."

This sets off a wide-ranging investigation that covers swaths of geography, changing social mores, and time. The investigation ends with a conclusion which the source describes as emotional and heartbreaking, and shattering because the reason for the crime no longer exists in the world.

== Cast ==
- Tetsuro Tamba – Detective Eitaro Imanishi
- Go Kato – Eiryo Waga/Hideo Motoura
- Kensaku Morita – Detective Hiroshi Yoshimura
- Yoko Shimada – Rieko Takagi
- Karin Yamaguchi – Sachiko Tadokoro
- Ken Ogata – Kenichi Miki
- Seiji Matsuyama – Shokichi Miki
- Yoshi Katō – Chiyokichi Motoura
- Chishū Ryū – Kojuro Kirihara
- Taketoshi Naito
- Yoshio Inaba
- Shin Saburi – Shigeyoshi Tadokoro
- Kinzō Shin

== Awards ==
- 1975 Kinema Junpo Award
  - Best Screenplay (Shinobu Hashimoto and Yōji Yamada)
- Readers' Choice Award
  - Best Japanese Film Director (Yoshitaro Nomura)
- 1975 Mainichi Film Concours
  - Best Director (Yoshitaro Nomura)
  - Best Film (Yoshitaro Nomura)
  - Best Film Score (Kosuke Sugano )
  - Best Screenplay (Shinobu Hashimoto and Yōji Yamada)
- 9th Moscow International Film Festival
  - Diploma (Yoshitaro Nomura)
  - Nominated for Golden Prize (Yoshitaro Nomura).
