= Mallock U2 =

Race car

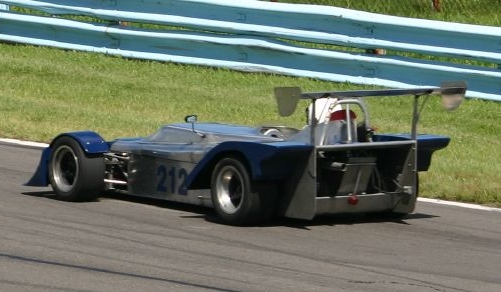
Mallock U2 Clubman car

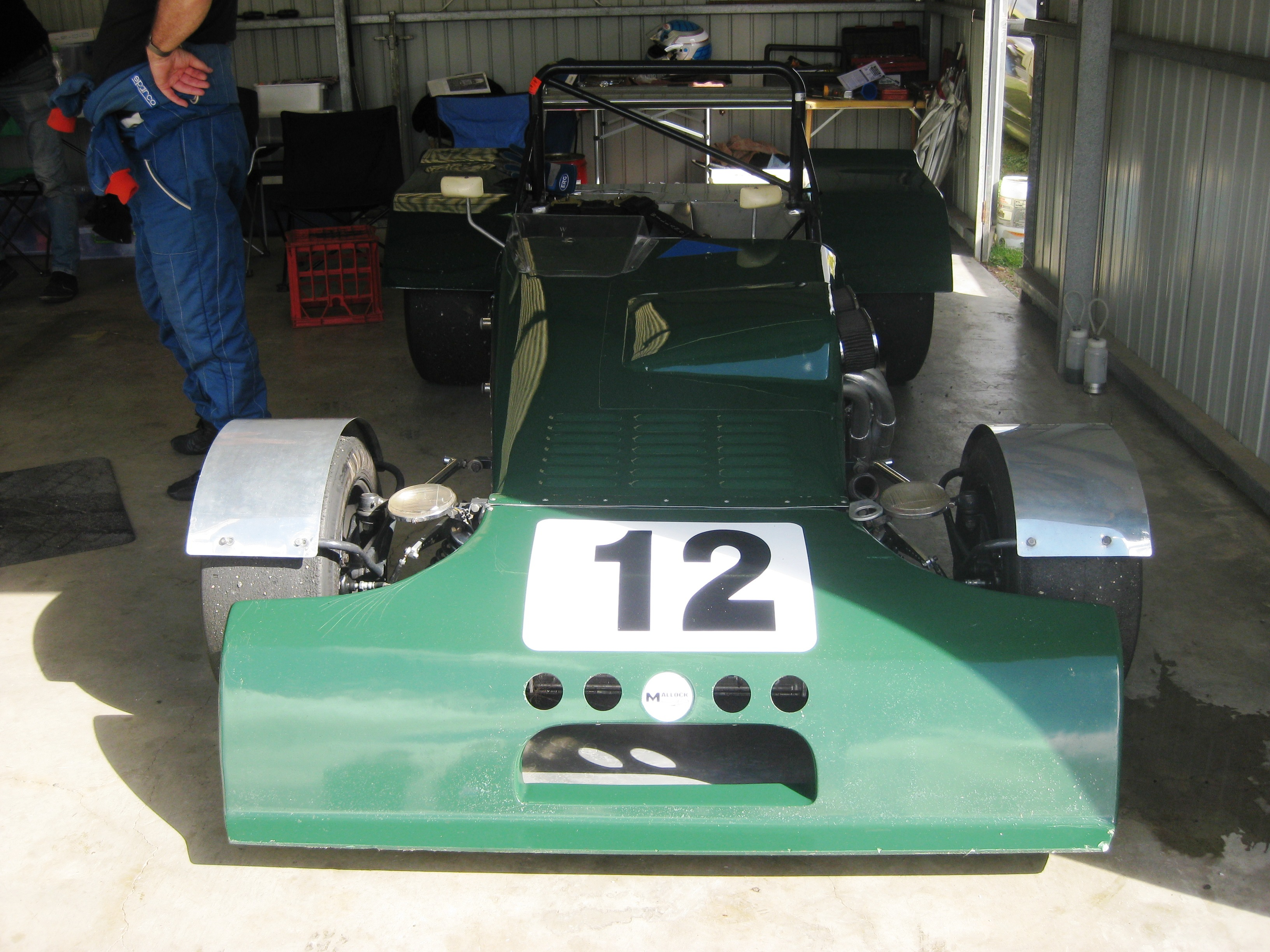
Mallock U2 front

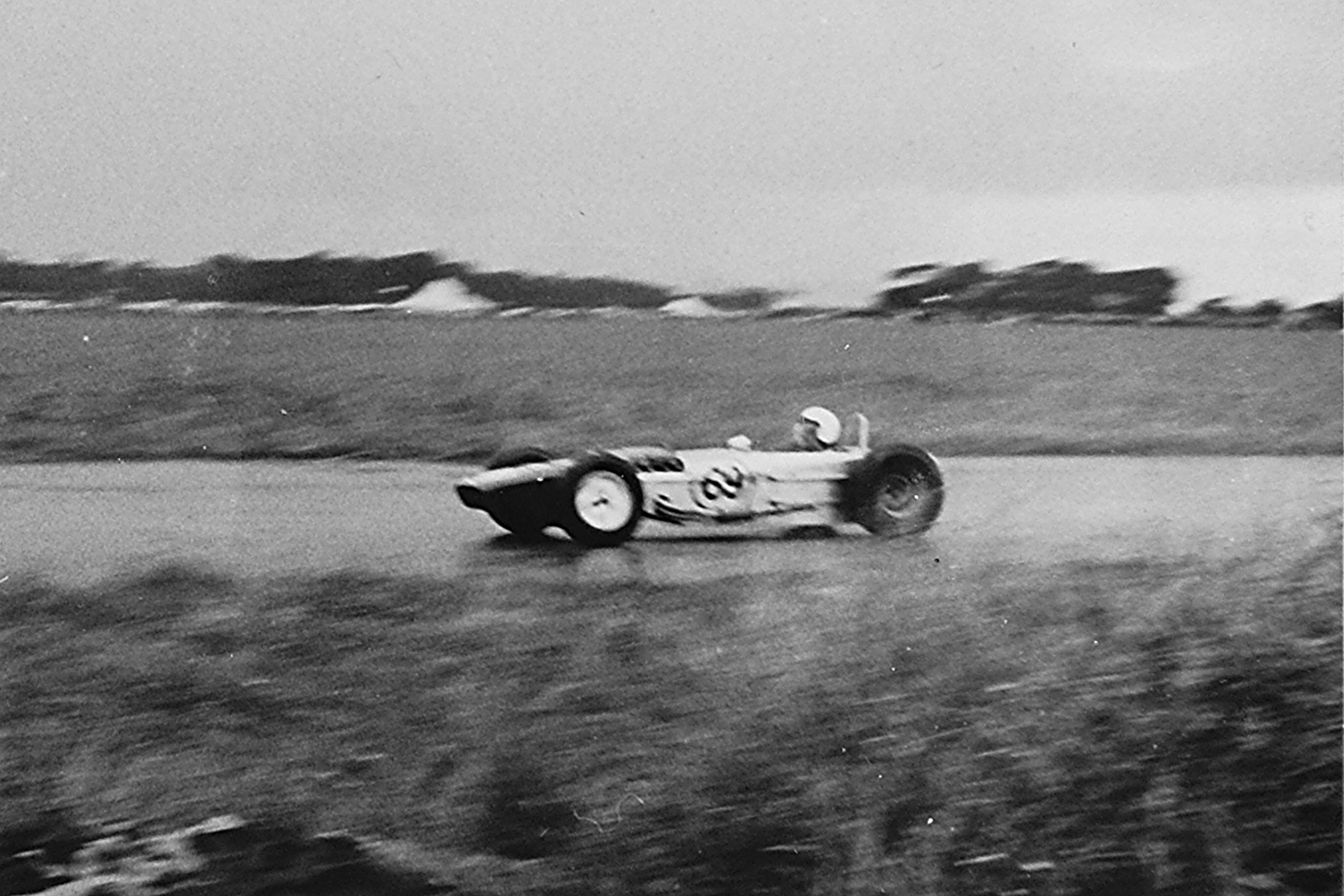
V. Davies's 1500cc Mallock U2 at the Llandow Circuit, South Wales, August 1966. Scanned print taken with a Halina 35X Super.

The Mallock U2 is a race car, designed, developed and built by Major Arthur Mallock and later his son Richard. Arthur's first customer race cars were simply called U2. The first of which the Mk1 were sold as kits in 1958. By about 1969 the name changed to Mallock U2. It was designed to compete in both single seater racing, e.g. Formula Junior and with the addition of cycle type mudguards in Sportscar racing. By 1965 a UK series was established to cater for “Lotus 7 type cars” or Clubmans which included the Mallock U2. purpose-built It was a versatile and highly effective front engined race car. It also competed in Formula Junior, Formula Ford, and Formula Three events. The chassis was constructed out of a steel tubular spaceframe, and it was later equipped with a De Dion rear axle, in 1972. It was very light, weighing only 948 lb (430 kg). It was powered by a number of different four-cylinder engines; including an 1,172 cc (71.5 cu in) Ford Sidevalve engine, a smaller 997 cc (60.8 cu in) Ford Kent engine, an 1,100 cc (67 cu in) BMC A-series engine, and even a 1.5–1.6 L (92–98 cu in) Ford-Cosworth SCA/Cosworth FVA engine. This drove the rear wheels through a conventional 4-speed Ford manual transmission to a live rear axle with the differential offset. This offset was made by mating up half of a Morris Minor axle and half of an axle first used in the Austin A30.
