= Mike Beckwith =

English racing driver (born 1935)

- Nationality: British
- Born: Michael Geoffrey Beckwith; 15 March 1935 (age 91) Hendon, London, UK
- Years active: 1961–1971

Michael Geoffrey Beckwith (born 15 March 1935) is a British former racing driver from England who competed in various classes in the 1960s and 1970s including non-championship Formula One and the Le Mans 24-hour race.

== Early life ==
Beckwith was born in Hendon, North London.

== Career ==
=== Early years (1962–1965) ===
Beckwith began his racing career in 1961, competing in two races with a Lotus 11. His best finish was fourth, in his first race, at Goodwood, in March.

1962 was Beckwith's first full season of racing. Using a Lotus 23, entered by Normand, a motor dealership for whom he worked, he achieved 6 victories and 6 other podium finishes out of 15 starts.

In 1963, Beckwith competed in 18 races using the Lotus 23, a Lotus Elite or an Elva Mk VII. That year, his occasional teammate was Jim Clark. He had one failure to finish and only three other results outside the top five. The season included victories at the Prix de Paris and at Mallory Park. He also took part in the Oulton Park Gold Cup using a Lotus 24-BRM entered by the British Racing Partnership. He retired after an accident on lap 17. The race was his only Formula One entry.

In 1964, Beckwith won the Marlboro 12 hour race in a Lotus Cortina, partnered by Jackie Stewart. He competed in domestic series using a Lotus Elan. Although eight entries were made, he took part in five events with a best finish of third at Mallory Park. He also acted as test-driver for BRM.

In 1965, out of six entries, the two events contested both resulted in wins at the Prix de Paris.

=== Formula Two and later career (1966–1971) ===
In 1966, entries in the Lavant Cup at Goodwood and the Eagle Trophy at Brands Hatch yielded fourth place in the former. However, he also drove in Formula Two (F2), entered by 'The Chequered Flag', with a Brabham-DAF (with Variomatic transmission). 16 races yielded one third- and one second-place.

The Brabham was replaced by a Gemini-DAF for 1967 and was slightly more successful with a win as well as other podium finishes. Four entries were also made by Bob Gerard using a Cooper T82. The same year, Beckwith participated in the Le Mans 24 hour race, competing in the P1.5 class using a Costin-Nathan GT, designed by Frank Costin and Roger Nathan. Co-driven by Nathan, the car retired after five hours with an electrical fault.

In 1968, Beckwith drove for A. G. Dean racing. Co-driven by Dean, in the latter's Ferrari Dino 206 S, he retired from the Brands Hatch six-hour race. At the Tourist Trophy, he finished 17th in Dean's Porsche Caerrera 6. In Formula Two, a move to a Tecno chassis was not successful. The Tecno was the chassis of choice in 1968 but Beckwith's rivals used conventional gearboxes. He also drove in European Formula Two for David Bridges using a Lola T100.

In 1969, Beckwith was entered in the Brands Hatch six-hour race in a works Lotus 62 (co-driven by Mo Nunn). However they did not attend. An entry alongside Nathan in the Costin-designed car (renamed as Astra RNR1 after Costin withdrew) in the 1000 km Monza was also not fulfilled. However, co-driven by Nathan, Beckwith finished 23rd in the car at the Nürburgring 1000 km race.

In 1970, Beckwith finished 16th in the Brands Hatch six-hour race in an Astra RNR2. co-driven again by Nathan, but did not finish in an Interserie event at Hockenheim using a group 7 Allegro sports car. An entry at the Nürburgring was not fulfilled. This marked the end of Beckwith's major career, 1971 yielding only a non-finish at Croft in the Lotus 62. He retired to concentrate on his career in the motor trade.

=== Non-championship Formula One results ===
(key)

Year	Entrant	Chassis	Engine	1	2	3	4	5	6	7	8	9	10	11	12	13	14
1963	British Racing Partnership	Lotus 24	BRM V8	LOM	GLV	PAU	IMO	SYR	AIN	INT	ROM	SOL	KAN	MED	AUT	OUL; Ret	RAN
