= Seiichi Tobata =

Japanese professor of agriculture (1899–1983)

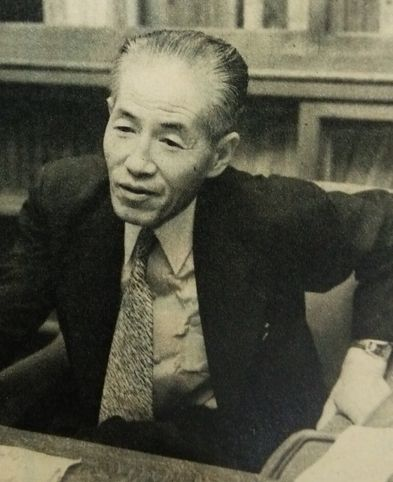
- Seiichi Tobata in 1956
- Born: 2 February 1899
- Died: 6 May 1983 (aged 84)
- Occupation: Professor of agriculture
- Awards: Ramon Magsaysay Award (1968)

Seiichi Tobata (東畑 精一, Tobata Seiichi; February 2, 1899 – May 6, 1983) was a Japanese professor of agriculture, and a pioneer of agricultural economics.

== Awards ==
Seiichi Tobata was awarded the 1968 Ramon Magsaysay Award for Public Service, for his contributions to modernization of Japanese agriculture.

He was also awarded the Grand Cordon of the Order of the Rising Sun (1975) and the Order of Culture (1980).

== See also ==
"The 1968 Ramon Magsaysay Award for Public Service – BIOGRAPHY of Seiichi Tobata" (Retrieved on February 10, 2008)
