= Yoshitarō Nomura =

Japanese filmmaker (1919–2005)

- 野村 芳太郎
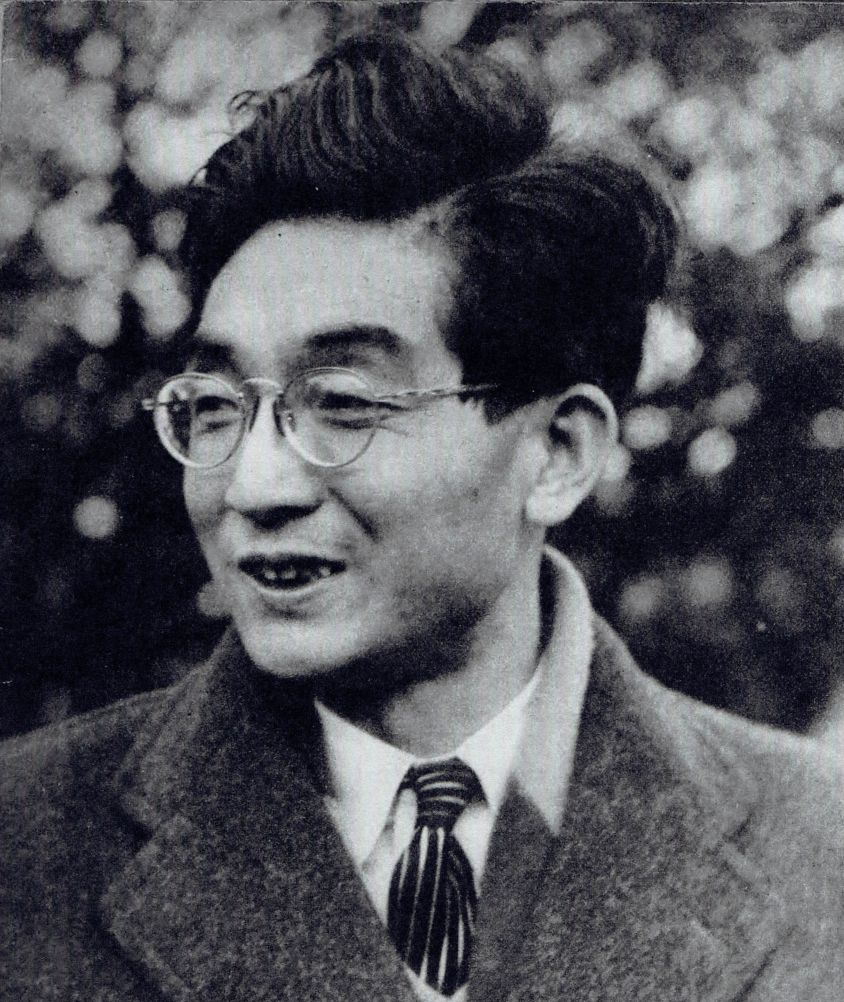
- Born: 23 April 1919; Asakusa, Tokyo, Japan
- Died: 8 April 2005 (aged 85); Shinjuku, Tokyo, Japan
- Occupation: Film director

Yoshitarō Nomura (野村 芳太郎, Nomura Yoshitarō, 23 April 1919 – 8 April 2005) was a prolific Japanese film director, film producer, and screenwriter. His first accredited film, Pigeon (鳩, Hato), was released in 1952; his last, Kikenna Onna-tachi (危険な女たち), in 1985. He received several awards during his career, including the Japanese Academy Award for "Best Director" for his 1978 film The Demon.

== Biography ==
Nomura was the son of Hotei Nomura, a contract film director at the Shochiku film studio. He entered Keio University to study art in 1936, graduated in 1941, and then joined the Shochiku studios as well. He was first hired as an assistant director but before being assigned any projects he was drafted into the army before being discharged in July 1946. In the fall of the same year, he returned to Shochiku and spent his entire film career working there.

During his years as an assistant director, he worked under the helm of film directors such as Keisuke Sasaki, Yuzo Kawashima, and Akira Kurosawa, whom he worked with in 1951 on the filming of The Idiot, based on the novel by Fyodor Dostoyevsky. In 1952, Nomura was promoted to director and made his directorial debut in 1953 with the film Pigeon (鳩, Hato), which was such a success that the studio gave him five more films to direct the following year.

He is considered one of the pioneers of Japanese film noir and frequently collaborated with mystery writer Seichō Matsumoto, adapting eight of his works into films. Nomura directed 89 films in total. He worked in several different genres, including musicals and jidaigeki (period dramas), but was considered most proficient within the thriller genre. Nomura's films frequently contain veiled criticism of Japanese society. His 1974 thriller Castle of Sand, for which he won a diploma at the 9th Moscow International Film Festival in 1975, is considered by many critics as his best work. Nomura retired from directing in 1985, after which he worked as a TV producer and as consultant to other Japanese directors. In 1995, he was decorated by the Japanese Government with the Order of the Rising Sun, the second highest order of Japan.

He died of pneumonia on 8 April 2005 in Shinjuku, Tokyo.

== Retrospective ==
In 2014, the National Science and Media Museum in the UK organised a programme of five Nomura films, all of which were adaptations of Seichō Matsumoto stories.

== Filmography as assistant director ==
- The Idiot (1951)
- Angels Dream Too (天使も夢を見る, Tenshi mo Yume o miru) (1951)
- Aihareru Tokoton Dōshi (相惚れトコトン同志) (1952)
- Konna Watashi ja Nakatta ni (こんな私じゃなかったに) (1952)
- Tomorrow is Payday (明日は月給日, Ashita ha Gekkyūbi) (1952)
- Gakusei Shachō (学生社長) (1953)

== Filmography as Director ==
=== 1950s ===
- Pigeon (鳩, Hato) (1952)
- Haru wa Camera ni Notte (春はキャメラに乗って) (1952)
- Jinanbō (次男坊) (1953)
- Gutei Kenkei (愚弟賢兄) (1953)
- Kinpira Sensei to Ojōsan (きんぴら先生とお嬢さん) (1953)
- Kurama Tengu Ao Men Yasha (鞍馬天狗 青面夜叉) (1953)
- Seishun Sanbagarasu (青春三羽烏) (1953)
- Izu no Odoriko (1954)
- Keian Suikoden (慶安水滸伝) (1954)
- Seishun Romance Seat Aozora ni Zasu (青春ロマンスシート 青空に坐す) (1954)
- Bikkuri Gojūsantsugi (びっくり五十三次) (1954)
- Daigaku wa Deta Keredo (大学は出たけれど) (1955)
- Zoku Otoko Daigaku Shinkon Kyōshitsu (続おとこ大学 新婚教室) (1955)
- Bōmeiki (亡命記) (1955)
- Tōkyō←→Honkon Mitsugetsu Ryokō (東京←→香港 蜜月旅行) (1955)
- Hanayome wa Doko ni Iru (花嫁はどこにいる) (1955)
- Taiyō wa Hibi ni Arata Nari (太陽は日々に新たなり) (1955)
- Koko wa Shizuka Nari (ここは静かなり) (1956)
- Kakubō Sanbagarasu (角帽三羽烏) (1956)
- Tabi Garasu Itarō (旅がらす伊太郎) (1956)
- Jinanbō Kokyō e Iku (次男坊故郷へ行く) (1956)
- Hanayome Boshū Chū (花嫁募集中) (1956)
- Odoru Matenrō (踊る摩天楼) (1956)
- Banjun Morishige no Fun Nyō Dan (伴淳・森繁の糞尿譚) (1957)
- Hanayome no o-Noroke (花嫁のおのろけ) (1958)
- Stakeout (張込み, Harikomi) (1958)
- Gekkyū 13,000 En (月給13,000円) (1958)
- Modern Dōchū Sono Koi Matta Nashi (モダン道中 その恋待ったなし) (1958)
- Donto Ikōze (どんと行こうぜ) (1959)

=== 1960s ===
- Kiiroi Sakuranbo (黄色いさくらんぼ) (1960)
- Ginza no o-Niichan Chōsensu (銀座のお兄ちゃん挑戦す) (1960)
- Kanshō Yō Dansei (鑑賞用男性) (1960)
- Saigo no Kirifuda (最後の切札) (1960)
- Haitoku no Mesu (背徳のメス) (1961)
- Zero Focus (ゼロの焦点, Zero no Shōten) (1961)
- Koi no Gashū (恋の画集) (1961)
- Haru no Sanmyaku (春の山脈) (1962)
- Hidarikiki no Sogekisha Tōkyōwan (左ききの狙撃者 東京湾) (1962)
- Ano Hashi no Hotori de (あの橋の畔で) (1962)
- Ano Hashi no Hotori de 2 (あの橋の畔で 第２部) (1962)
- Ano Hashi no Hotori de 3 (あの橋の畔で 第３部) (1963)
- Haikei Tennōheika-sama (拝啓天皇陛下様) (1963)
- Ano Hashi no Hotoride Kanketsu Hen (あの橋の畔で 完結篇) (1963)
- The Scarlet Camellia (五辧の椿, Go no Tsubaki) (1964)
- Zoku. Haikei Tennōheika Sama (続・拝啓天皇陛下様) (1964)
- Haikei Sōri Daijin Sama (拝啓総理大臣様) (1964)
- Suteki na Konban wa (素敵な今晩わ) (1965)
- Ohanahan (おはなはん) (1966)
- Ohanahan 2 (おはなはん 第二部) (1966)
- Bōkyō to Okite (望郷と掟) (1966)
- Danryū (暖流) (1966)
- Inochi Hateru Hi made (命果てる日まで) (1966)
- Family of Women (女たちの庭, Onna Tachi no Niwa) (1967)
- Aa! Kimi ga Ai (あゝ君が愛) (1967)
- Onna no Isshō (女の一生) (1967)
- Otoko nara Furi Mukuna (男なら振りむくな) (1967)
- Hakuchū Dōdō (白昼堂々) (1968)
- [Konto 55-gō to Suizenji Kiyoko no] Kamisama no Koibito ([コント５５号と水前寺清子の]神様の恋人) (1968)
- Yoake no Futari (夜明けの二人) (1968)
- Dekkai Dekkai Yarō (でっかいでっかい野郎) (1969)
- Hibari. Hashi no Hana (ひばり・橋の花と喧嘩) (1969)
- Konto 55-gō to Suizenji Kiyoko no Wan Tū Panchi Sanbyaku Rokujūgo-ho no Māchi (コント５５号と水前寺清子のワン・ツウー・パンチ 三百六十五歩のマーチ) (1969)
- Chinchin 55-gō Buttobase! Shuppatsu Shinkō (チンチン５５号ぶっ飛ばせ！出発進行) (1969)

=== 1970s ===
- Nani ga Nan demo Tamegorō (なにがなんでも為五郎) (1970)
- The Shadow Within (影の車, Kage no Kuruma) (1970)
- Sandogasa Da Yo Jinsei wa (三度笠だよ人生は) (1970)
- Kochira 55-gō Ōtō Seyo! Kiki Hyappatsu (こちら５５号応答せよ！危機百発) (1970)
- Konto 55-gō to Suizenji Kiyoko no Dai Shōbu (コント５５号と水前寺清子の大勝負) (1970)
- Konto 55-gō to Mīko no Zettaizetsumei (コント５５号とミーコの絶体絶命) (1971)
- Yaruzo Mite Ore Tamegorō (やるぞみておれ為五郎) (1971)
- Hana mo Mi mo Aru Tamegorō (花も実もある為五郎) (1971)
- Hatsu Warai Bikkuri Bushidō (初笑いびっくり武士道) (1972)
- Dame Oyaji (ダメおやじ) (1973)
- Shina no Kawa (しなの川) (1973)
- Castle of Sand (1974)
- Tōkyō do mannaka (東京ド真ン中) (1974)
- Shōwa Karesusuki (昭和枯れすすき) (1975)
- Village of the Eight Tombs (八つ墓村, Yatsu Haka Mura) (1977)
- The Incident (1978)
- The Demon (1978)
- The Three Undelivered Letters (配達されない三通の手紙, Haitatsusarenai Santsū no Tegami) (1979) based on a novel by Ellery Queen

=== 1980s ===
- Bad Sorts (わるいやつら, Warui Yatsura) (1980)
- Writhing Tongue (震える舌, Furueru Shita) (1980)
- Mayonaka no Shōtaijō (真夜中の招待状) (1981)
- Suspicion (1982)
- Meisō Chizu (迷走地図) (1983)
- Nezumi Kozō Kaitō Den (ねずみ小僧怪盗伝) (1984)
- Kikenna Onna-tachi (危険な女たち) (1985)
