= Mainichi Film Award for Best Screenplay =

Annual Japanese film award

- Awarded for: Best screenplay of the year
- Country: Japan
- First award: 1946

The Mainichi Film Award for Best Screenplay is a film award given at the Mainichi Film Awards.

== Award winners ==
Year	Film	Scriptwriter
1946	Ōsoneke no Ashita	Eijirō Hisaita
1947	One Wonderful Sunday	Keinosuke Uekusa
1948	Children Hand in Hand	Mansaku Itami
1949	Late Spring	Kogo Noda; Yasujirō Ozu
1950	Itsuwareru Seisō	Kaneto Shindo
1951	Carmen Comes Home	Keisuke Kinoshita
1952	Ikiru	Akira Kurosawa; Shinobu Hashimoto; Hideo Oguni
1953	A Japanese Tragedy; Magokoro; Koibumi	Keisuke Kinoshita
1954	Twenty-Four Eyes; The Garden of Women	Keisuke Kinoshita
1955	Meoto zenzai Ukikusa Nikki; Wataridori Itsu Kaeru	Toshio Yasumi
1956	Mahiru no ankoku Hakusen	Shinobu Hashimoto
1957	An Osaka Story; Stepbrothers	Yoshikata Yoda
1958	Harikomi; Iwashigumo; Yoru no Tuzumi	Shinobu Hashimoto
1959	Kiku to Isamu	Yōko Mizuki
1960	Kuroi Gashū; Irohanihoheto	Shinobu Hashimoto
1961	The Human Condition; Namonaku Mazushiku Utsukushiku; Futari no Musuko	Zenzo Matsuyama
1962	Being Two Isn't Easy; The Broken Commandment	Natto Wada
1963	High and Low	Akira Kurosawa; Hideo Oguni; Ryūzō Kikushima; Eijirō Hisaita
1964	Echigo Tsutsuishi Oyashirazu; Ai to Shi o Mitsumete	Yasutarō Yagi
1965	A Fugitive from the Past; Hiyameshi to Osanto Chan	Naoyuki Suzuki
1966	Shiroi Kyotō	Shinobu Hashimoto
1967	Wakamono Tachi	Hisashi Yamanouchi
1968	Profound Desires of the Gods	Shohei Imamura; Keiji Hasebe
1969	Boy	Tsutomu Tamura
1970	Where Spring Comes Late	Yoji Yamada
1970	Tora-san's Runaway	Akira Miyazaki
1971	The Ceremony	Mamoru Sasaki; Nagisa Ōshima
1972	The Rendezvous; Tabi no Omosa	Fumio Ishimori
1973	Tora-san's Forget Me Not	Yoji Yamada; Akira Miyazaki; Yoshitaka Asama
1974	Castle of Sand	Shinobu Hashimoto; Yoji Yamada
1975	Matsuri no Junbi	Takehiro Nakajima
1976	Fumō Chitai	Nobuo Yamada
1977	The Yellow Handkerchief	Yoji Yamada; Yoshitaka Asama
1978	Jiken	Kaneto Shindo
1979	Vengeance Is Mine	Masaru Baba
1980	Zigeunerweisen	Yōzō Tanaka
1981	Station	Sō Kuramoto
1982	Suspicion	Motomu Furuta; Yoshitarō Nomura
1983	Merry Christmas, Mr. Lawrence	Nagisa Ōshima
1983	The Family Game	Yoshimitsu Morita
1984	W's Tragedy	Haruhiko Arai; Shinichiro Sawai
1985	Fire Festival	Kenji Nakagami
1985	Typhoon Club	Yūji Kato
1986	Comic Magazine	Yuya Uchida; Isao Takagi
1987	A Taxing Woman	Juzo Itami
1988	Ikoka Modoroka	Toshio Kamata
1989	Shaso	Hiroo Matsuda
1990	Childhood Days	Taichi Yamada
1991	12-nin no Yasashii Nihonjin	Kōki Mitani; Tokyo Sunshine Boys
1992	The Triple Cross	Shōichi Maruyama
1993	All Under the Moon	Yoichi Sai; Wui Sin Chong
1993	Niji no Hashi; Bōkyō	Zenzo Matsuyama
1994	Ghost Pub; Natsu no Niwa The Friends	Yōzō Tanaka
1995	Like Grains of Sand	Ryōsuke Hashiguchi
1996	Shall We Dance?	Masayuki Suo
1997	Welcome Back, Mr. McDonald	Kōki Mitani
1998	Love Letter; Wait and See	Takehiro Nakajima
1999	M/Other	Nobuhiro Suwa; Tomokazu Miura; Makiko Watanabe
2000	A Class to Remember 4: Fifteen	Yoji Yamada; Yoshitaka Asama; Emiko Hiramatsu
2001	Go	Kankurō Kudō
2002	Out	Wui Sin Chong
2003	Hebi Ichigo	Miwa Nishikawa
2003	Battle Royale II: Requiem	Kenta Fukasaku; Norio Kida
2004	Vibrator	Haruhiko Arai
2005	A Stranger of Mine	Kenji Uchida
2006	What the Snow Brings	Masato Katō
2007	A Gentle Breeze in the Village	Aya Watanabe
2008	All Around Us	Ryōsuke Hashiguchi
2009	Villon's Wife	Yōzō Tanaka
2010	Heaven's Story	Yūki Satō
2011	Postcard	Kaneto Shindo
2012	Our Homeland	Yang Yong-hi
2013	The Backwater	Haruhiko Arai
2014	0.5mm	Momoko Andō
2015	Kakekomi	Masato Harada
2016	Satoshi: A Move for Tomorrow	Kōsuke Mukai
2017	The Tokyo Night Sky Is Always the Densest Shade of Blue	Yuya Ishii
2018	Lying to Mom	Katsumi Nojiri
2019	Another World	Junji Sakamoto
2020	I Never Shot Anyone	Shōichi Maruyama
2021	Intolerance	Keisuke Yoshida
2022	Plan 75	Chie Hayakawa
2023	Okiku and the World	Junji Sakamoto
2024	Evil Does Not Exist	Ryusuke Hamaguchi
2025	Kokuho	Satoko Okudera
