= Throne of Blood =

1957 Japanese film by Akira Kurosawa

- Theatrical release poster
- Directed by: Akira Kurosawa
- Screenplay by: Shinobu Hashimoto; Ryūzō Kikushima; Akira Kurosawa; Hideo Oguni
- Based on: Macbeth by William Shakespeare (uncredited)
- Produced by: Akira Kurosawa; Sōjirō Motoki
- Starring: Toshiro Mifune; Isuzu Yamada; Takashi Shimura
- Cinematography: Asakazu Nakai
- Edited by: Akira Kurosawa (uncredited)
- Music by: Masaru Sato
- Production company: Toho Co., Ltd
- Distributed by: Toho
- Release date: January 15, 1957 (Japan)
- Running time: 110 minutes
- Country: Japan
- Language: Japanese
- Budget: ¥120 million ($350,000)
- Box office: ¥198 million (Japanese rentals); US$46,808 (Kurosawa & Mifune Festival)

Throne of Blood (Japanese: 蜘蛛巣城, Hepburn: Kumonosu-jō; lit. 'The Spider Web Castle') is a 1957 Japanese epic jidaigeki film directed, co-written, produced, and edited by Akira Kurosawa, with special effects by Eiji Tsuburaya. The film transposes the plot of English dramatist William Shakespeare's play Macbeth (1606) from Medieval Scotland to feudal Japan, with stylistic elements drawn from Noh drama. The film stars Toshiro Mifune and Isuzu Yamada in the lead roles, modelled on the characters Macbeth and Lady Macbeth.

Like the play, the film tells the story of a warrior who assassinates his sovereign at the urging of his ambitious wife. Kurosawa was a fan of the play and intended to make his own adaptation for several years, delaying it after learning of Orson Welles' Macbeth (1948). Among his changes was the ending, which required archers to shoot arrows around Mifune. The film was shot around Mount Fuji and the Izu Peninsula. With a budget of US$350,000 (equivalent to $4,012,000 in 2025), the film was one of the most expensive films ever made in Japan at the time of its release.

Despite the change in setting and language and numerous creative liberties, Throne of Blood is often considered one of the best film adaptations of the classic play, and has received much critical praise. The film won two Mainichi Film Awards, including Best Actor for Toshiro Mifune.

== Plot ==
Childhood friends and samurai commanders Washizu and Miki are called to the Spider's Web Castle, the estate of local lord Tsuzuki, after defeating the lord's enemies in battle. On their way through the Spider's Web Forest, they encounter an evil spirit who foretells their future. The spirit informs them that Washizu will be named Lord of the Northern Garrison and Miki will become commander of the first fortress that day, that Washizu will later become Lord of Spider's Web Castle, and that Miki's son Yoshiteru will eventually become lord.

When the two reach the castle, Tsuzuki rewards them with exactly what the spirit had predicted. As Washizu discusses the events with his wife Asaji, she convinces him to murder Tsuzuki when he visits. She offers drugged sake to Tsuzuki's guards, incapacitating them and allowing Washizu to kill Tsuzuki with a spear. She then frames an unconscious guard, who is killed by Washizu in the ensuing chaos. Both Kunimaru, Tsuzuki's vengeful son, and Noriyasu, one of Tsuzuki's advisors, suspect Washizu's treachery and try to warn Miki, but Miki refuses to believe them.

Under Asaji's influence, Washizu comes to question Miki's loyalty but nevertheless chooses Yoshiteru as heir, as he and Asaji have no child of their own. Washizu plans to inform Miki and Yoshiteru about the decision at a grand banquet, but Asaji reveals that she is pregnant, leaving him in a quandary. He eventually decides to eliminate Miki and Yoshiteru.

At the banquet, an agitated Washizu drinks sake copiously as the guests await Miki and Yoshiteru's arrival. He hallucinates and sees Miki's ghost and, in a delusional panic, reveals what has transpired by exclaiming that he is willing to slay Miki a second time, unsheathing his sword and slashing at Miki's empty seat. Asaji has the guests dismissed. One of Washizu's men arrives carrying a bundle containing the severed head of Miki, and informs the couple that Yoshiteru has escaped. Washizu kills the man in a fit of anger.

As Washizu grows increasingly paranoid and tyrannical, his men begin to doubt and fear him, and rumors circulate that Yoshiteru, Kunimaru, and Noriyasu have joined forces with their onetime rival Inui. Washizu is distraught by the news that his heir has been born dead. In order to ascertain the outcome of the impending battle, he returns to the forest in search of the evil spirit. The spirit tells him that he will not be defeated in battle until "the trees of the Spider's Web Forest rise against the castle", leading him to believe that his victory is all but assured.

The next morning, Washizu finds Asaji in a semi-catatonic state, trying to wash clean an imaginary stain and stench of blood from her hands. He is then told by panicked soldiers that the trees of Spider's Web Forest have risen to attack them. A desperate Washizu tries to muster his troops, but they ignore his commands and fire arrows at him, severely wounding him. When Washizu tells them that to kill their lord is treason, they accuse him of having done the same. As his enemies approach the gates, he succumbs to his wounds, attempting to draw his sword as he dies. It is then revealed that the attacking force had used trees, cut from the forest during the night, to shield their advance onto the castle.

== Cast ==
Actor	Character	Macbeth analogue
Toshiro Mifune	Taketoki Washizu	Macbeth
Isuzu Yamada	Lady Asaji Washizu	Lady Macbeth
Takashi Shimura	Noriyasu Odagura	Macduff
Akira Kubo	Yoshiteru Miki	Fleance
Yōichi Tachikawa	Kunimaru Tsuzuki	Malcolm
Minoru Chiaki	Yoshiaki Miki	Banquo
Takamaru Sasaki	Lord Kuniharu Tsuzuki	King Duncan
Chieko Naniwa	Witch	The Three Witches
Kokuten Kōdō	First General	
Sachio Sakai	Washizu's samurai	
Yū Fujiki	Washizu's samurai	
Kichijirō Ueda	Washizu's workman	
Takeshi Katō	Tsuzuki's samurai	
Shōbun Inoue	Tsuzuki's messenger	
Asao Koike	Tsuzuki's messenger	
Eiko Miyoshi	Senior lady-in-waiting	
Isao Kimura	Messenger (Phantom)	
Seiji Miyaguchi	Messenger (Phantom)	
Nobuo Nakamura	Messenger (Phantom)	

== Crew ==
- Akira Kurosawa – director, co-writer, producer, editor
- Eiji Tsuburaya – special effects director
- Yoshimitsu Banno – assistant director
- Asakazu Nakai - cinematographer
- Kuichirō Kishida – lighting
- Takao Saitō – camera assistant
- Masao Fukuda – still photographer
- Kohei Ezaki – chief art director
- Yoshirō Muraki – art director and costume designer
- Masanori Kobayashi – make-up artist
- Ichirō Minawa – sound effects

Personnel taken from Throne of Blood by Robert N. Watson.

== Production ==
=== Development ===
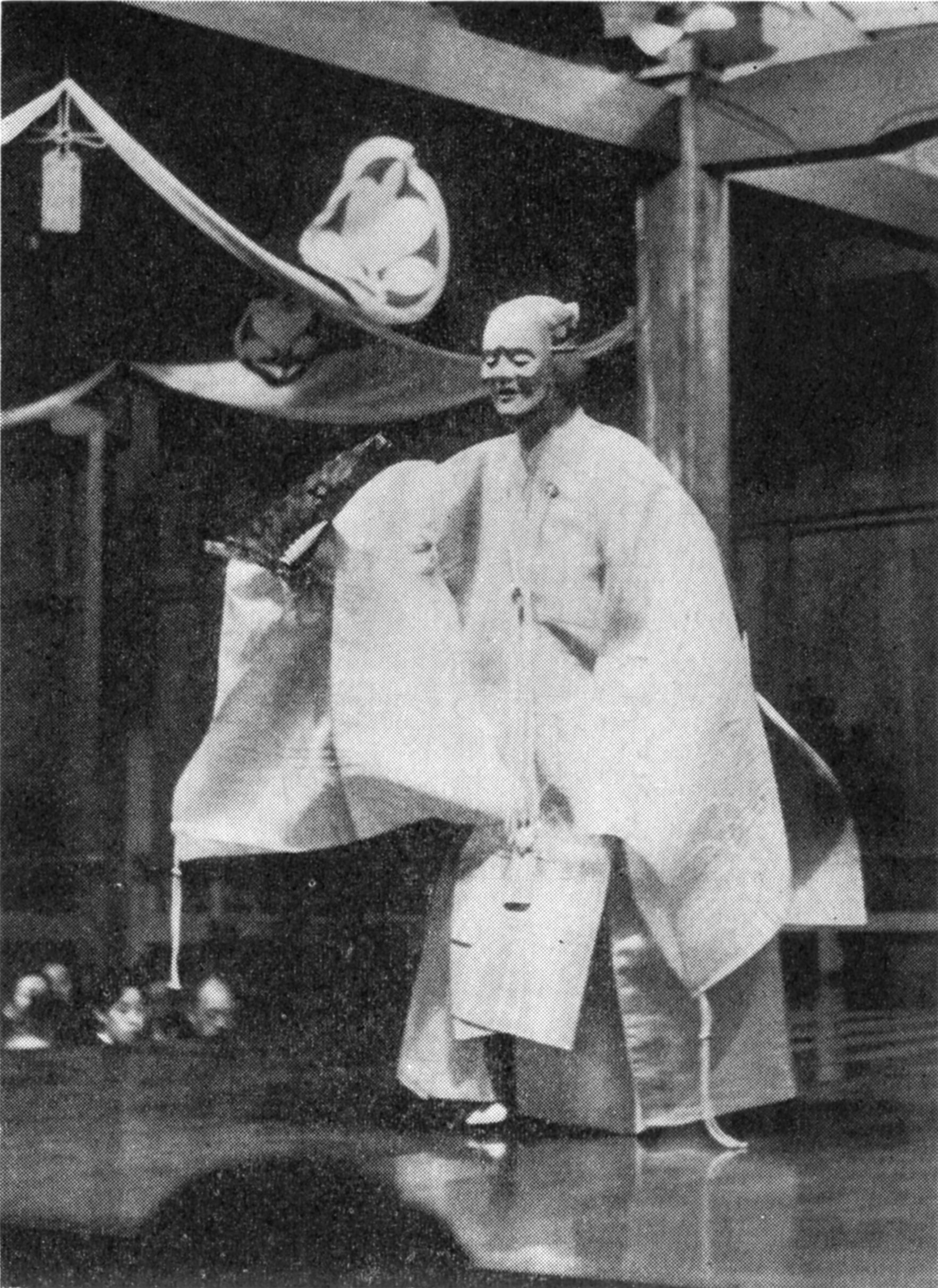
Noh was an influence on the film.

William Shakespeare's plays had been read in Japan since the Meiji Restoration in 1868, though banned during World War II for not being Japanese. Director Akira Kurosawa stated that he had admired Shakespeare's Macbeth for a long time, and that he envisioned making a film adaptation of it after he completed his 1950 film Rashomon. When he learned that Orson Welles had released his own version of Macbeth in 1948, Kurosawa decided to postpone his adaptation project for several years.

Kurosawa believed that Scotland and Japan in the Middle Ages shared social problems and that these had lessons for the present day. Moreover, Macbeth could serve as a cautionary tale complementing his 1952 film Ikiru.

In May 1956, Kurosawa announced that he would be producing three samurai films for Toho, Throne of Blood, The Hidden Fortress, and Revenge, each to be filmed from September 1956 to early 1957 by other directors. Ishirō Honda, best known for directing the 1954 kaiju film Godzilla, was slated to direct Throne of Blood, but Kurosawa ended up directing all three films himself.

The film combines Shakespeare's play with the Noh style of drama. Kurosawa was an admirer of Noh, which he preferred over Kabuki. In particular, he wished to incorporate Noh-style body movements and set design. Noh also makes use of masks, and the evil spirit is seen, in different parts of the film, wearing faces reminiscent of these masks, starting with yaseonna (old lady). Noh often stresses the Buddhist doctrine of impermanence. This is connected to Washizu being denied salvation, with the chorus singing that his ghost is still in the world. Furthermore, the film score's use of flute and drum are drawn from Noh.

=== Writing ===
All three of Kurosawa's frequent script collaborators participated for the first time: Hideo Oguni, Shinobu Hashimoto, and Ryūzō Kikushima, each working with the director for their fourth time. Initially, the screenwriters wrote the script with the intention that it would be directed by Ishirō Honda, but Toho insisted Kurosawa take the directing position after reading the script and realizing a large budget was required for the film.

=== Set design ===
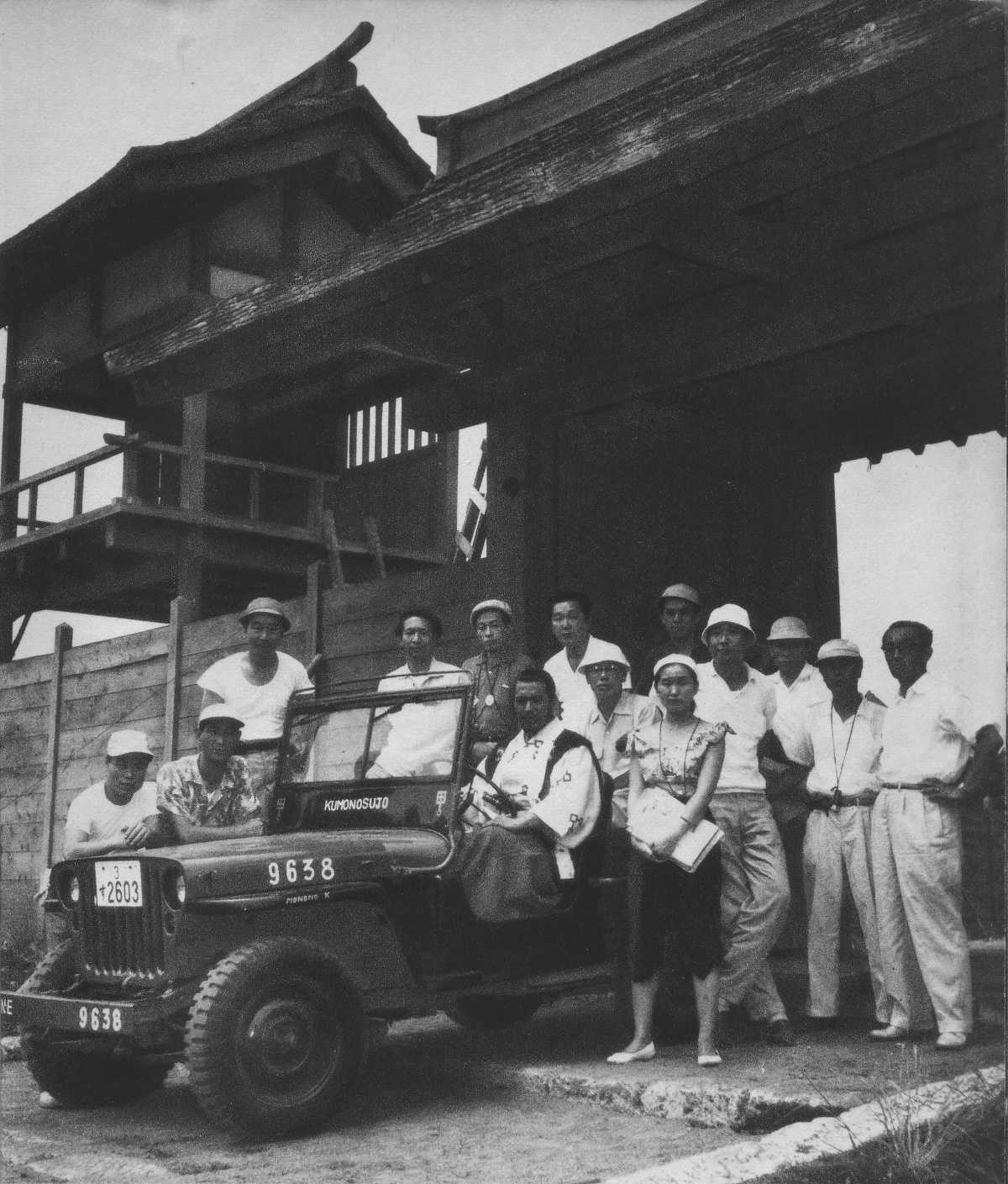
Cast and crew members on the open set of Throne of Blood, published in the early September 1956 issue of Kinema Junpo. (from left to right) Shinjin Akiike, Fumio Yanoguchi, Kuichirō Kishida, Samaji Nonagase, Takao Saito, Toshiro Mifune (in the jeep), Minoru Chiaki, Takashi Shimura, Teruyo Nogami (scripter), Yoshirō Muraki, Akira Kurosawa, Hiroshi Nezu, Asakazu Nakai, and Sōjirō Motoki.

The castle exteriors were built and shot on the volcanic slopes of Mount Fuji. The castle courtyard was constructed at Toho's Tamagawa studio, with volcanic soil brought from Fuji so that the ground matched. The interiors were shot in a smaller studio in Tokyo. The forest scenes were a combination of actual Fuji forest and studio shots in Tokyo. Washizu's mansion was shot in the Izu Peninsula.

In Kurosawa's own words:

"It was a very hard film to make. We decided that the main castle set had to be built on the slope of Mount Fuji, not because I wanted to show this mountain but because it has precisely the stunted landscape that I wanted. And it is usually foggy. I had decided that I wanted lots of fog for this film... Making the set was very difficult because we didn't have enough people and the location was so far from Tokyo. Fortunately, there was a U.S. Marine Corps base nearby, and they helped a great deal; also a whole MP battalion helped us out. We all worked very hard indeed, clearing the ground, building the set. Our labor on this steep fog-bound slope, I remember, absolutely exhausted us; we almost got sick."

Production designer Yoshirō Muraki said the crew opted to employ the color black in the set walls, and a lot of armor, to complement the mist and fog effects. This design was based on ancient scrolls depicting Japanese castles.

=== Special effects ===
The scene in which trees from the Spider's Web Forest approach the castle, was created by Toho's special effects department and directed by Eiji Tsuburaya. Originally, this scene was longer, but Kurosawa cut several shots of trees from the film because he was unimpressed by them.

Washizu's death scene, in which his own archers turn upon him and shoot him with arrows, was in fact performed with real arrows, shot by knowledgeable and skilled archers. During filming, Mifune waved his arms, which was how the actor indicated his intended bodily direction. This was for his own safety in order to prevent the archers from accidentally hitting him.

== Release ==
The film was released theatrically in Japan on January 15, 1957, by Toho, and grossed ¥198 million, making it the second-highest-grossing Japanese film of 1957, after Shintoho's Emperor Meiji and the Great Russo-Japanese War, which grossed ¥542.91 million. In the United States, the film was distributed by Brandon Films with English subtitles at 105 minutes and opened on November 22, 1961.

Throne of Blood was the first film to be screened at the 1st BFI London Film Festival on October 16, 1957. After the screening, Akira Kurosawa attended a party at film critic Dilys Powell's house, and had dinner with actor Laurence Olivier, and actress Vivien Leigh who were planning on playing Macbeth and Lady Macbeth in a film adaptation of William Shakespeare's Macbeth that never materialized. Olivier told Kurosawa that he had enjoyed watching the film and was impressed by the scene in which Toshiro Mifune's Macbeth is shot by arrows. Isuzu Yamada's acting impressed Leigh, and she asked why Yamada made such little movement when she was mad.

In 1991, the film was released in the United States on LaserDisc by The Criterion Collection, and on VHS by Media Home Entertainment. Toho released the film on DVD in Japan in 2002 and on Blu-ray in 2010. In 2013, Madman Entertainment distributed the film on DVD in Region 4. In Region A, The Criterion Collection released the film on Blu-ray in 2014, having released the film on DVD 10 years earlier.

In 2018, the film was screened by the National Film Archive of Japan at the Essential 2018 National Film Archive Opening Cinema Memorial in Kyōbashi, Tokyo, along with 9 other Japanese films. In 2021, the Kawakita Memorial Film Institute screened a 4K remaster of the film at the 12th 10am Film Festival.

== Reception ==
=== Critical response ===
On review aggregator Rotten Tomatoes the film has an approval rating of 96% based on 47 reviews, with an average score of 8.80/10. The site's consensus states: "A career high point for Akira Kurosawa – and one of the best film adaptations of a Shakespeare play."

When it was released in the United States in 1961, the Time review praised Kurosawa and the film as "a visual descent into the hell of greed and superstition".

Bosley Crowther from The New York Times called the idea of Shakespeare in Japanese "amusing", and complimented the cinematography. Most critics stated it was the visuals that filled the gap left by the removal of Shakespeare's poetry.

U.K. directors Geoffrey Reeve and Peter Brook considered the film to be a masterpiece, but denied it was a Shakespeare film because of the language. Film historian Donald Richie praised the film as "a marvel because it is made of so little: fog, wind, trees, mist". Film critic Stephen Prince compared its minimalist landscapes to the painting technique sumi-e.

David Parkinson of Empire magazine rated it 5 out of 5, calling it "highly cinematic" and "a film studded with magnificent set-pieces". Derek Malcolm of The Guardian considered Throne of Blood the film to "typify Kurosawa's art", writing, "It remains a landmark of visual strength, permeated by a particularly Japanese sensibility, and is perhaps the finest Shakespearean adaptation ever committed to the screen."

The film has received praise from literary critics despite the many liberties it takes with the original play. The American literary critic Harold Bloom judged it "the most successful film version of Macbeth". Sylvan Barnet writes it captured Macbeth as a strong warrior, and that "Without worrying about fidelity to the original," Throne of Blood is "much more satisfactory" than most Shakespeare films. Film historian David A. Conrad wrote that just as Shakespeare's play commented on "questions of legitimacy, masculinity, and civil war" that resonated in early 17th-century England, Kurosawa's movie engages with contemporary Japanese debates about the "spiderless cobweb" of postwar bureaucracy and industry. In his Movie Guide, Leonard Maltin gave the film four stars, calling it a "graphic, powerful adaptation".

=== Accolades ===
Award	Category	Recipient(s)	Result	Ref(s)
Venice Film Festival	Golden Lion	Akira Kurosawa	Nominated	
Kinema Junpo Awards	Best 10 Japanese Films		4th place	
Kinema Junpo Awards	Best Actress	Isuzu Yamada	Won	
Mainichi Film Awards	Best Actor	Toshiro Mifune	Won	
Mainichi Film Awards	Best Art Direction	Yoshirō Muraki	Won	
Blue Ribbon Awards	Best 10 Japanese Films		7th place	
Blue Ribbon Awards	Technology Award	Yoshirō Muraki	Won	
Visual Technology Awards	Art	Yoshirō Muraki	Won	

== Legacy ==
Akira Kurosawa's 1960 film The Bad Sleep Well, was heavily influenced by William Shakespeare's Hamlet, as well as The Count of Monte Cristo by Alexandre Dumas. Roman Polanski's 1971 film version of Macbeth has similarities to Throne of Blood, in shots of characters on twisted roads, set design, and music to identify locations and psychological conditions. Toshiro Mifune's death scene was the source of inspiration for Piper Laurie's death scene in the 1976 film Carrie, in which knives are thrown at her, in this case by character Carrie White using her psychic powers. In 1985, Kurosawa returned to adapting Shakespeare, choosing the play King Lear for his final epic film Ran, and again moving the setting to feudal Japan.

A Malay language remake called Istana Berdarah (lit. 'Bloody Palace') was made by Singaporean studio Keris Film Production in 1964 directed by Hussein Haniff.

Throne of Blood is referenced in the anime film Millennium Actress (2001) in the form of the Forest Spirit/Witch. It was adapted for the stage by director Ping Chong, premiering at the 2010 Oregon Shakespeare Festival in Ashland, Oregon.

== See also ==
- Akira Kurosawa's other Shakespeare adaptations:
  - The Bad Sleep Well, loosely based on Hamlet
  - Ran, based on King Lear
- List of Japanese films of 1957
- List of William Shakespeare screen adaptations

== Bibliography ==
- Barnet, Sylvan (1998). "Macbeth on Stage and Screen". Macbeth. A Signet Classic. ISBN 9780451526779.
- Bloom, Harold (1999). Shakespeare: The Invention of the Human. New York: Riverhead Books. ISBN 1-57322-751-X.
- Buchanan, Judith R. (2014). Shakespeare on Film. Routledge. ISBN 978-1317874966.
- Burnett, Mark Thornton (2014). "Akira Kurosawa". Great Shakespeareans Set IV. Vol. 14–18. London, New Delhi, New York and Sydney: Bloomsbury. ISBN 978-1441145284.
- Conrad, David A. (2022). Akira Kurosawa and Modern Japan. McFarland & Company. ISBN 978-1476686745.
- Davies, Anthony (1994). Filming Shakespeare's Plays: The Adaptations of Laurence Olivier, Orson Welles, Peter Brook, Akira Kurosawa. Cambridge University Press. ISBN 0521399130.
- Galbraith IV, Stuart (2002). The Emperor and the Wolf: The Lives and Films of Akira Kurosawa and Toshiro Mifune. Faber and Faber, Inc. ISBN 978-0-571-19982-2.
- Galbraith IV, Stuart (2008). The Toho Studios Story: A History and Complete Filmography. Lanham, Maryland, Toronto and Plymouth: The Scarecrow Press. ISBN 978-1461673743.
- Hamano, Yasuki, ed. (December 18, 2009). The Akira Kurosawa Archives (in Japanese). Vol. 2. Tokyo: Kodansha. ISBN 9784062155762.
- Hatchuel, Sarah; Vienne-Guerrin, Nathalie; Bladen, Victoria, eds. (2013). "The Power of Prophecy in Global Adaptations of Macbeth". Shakespeare on Screen: Macbeth. Publication Univ Rouen Havre. ISBN 9791024000404.
- "The Complete 85-Installment History of Kinema Junpo's Best Ten: 1924-2011". Kinema Junpo (in Japanese). Kinema Junposha. May 17, 2012. ISBN 9784873767550.
- Kliman, Bernice W. (2004). Macbeth (Second ed.). Manchester and New York: Manchester University Press. ISBN 0719062292.
- Kurosawa, Akira (December 1957). "10 Days in London and Paris". Kinema Junpo (in Japanese). No. 192. Kinema Junposha.
- Jin, Lei (2009). "Silence and Sound in Kurosawa's Throne of Blood". Shakespeare in Hollywood, Asia, and Cyberspace. West Lafayette, Indiana: Purdue University Press. ISBN 978-1557535290.
- Maltin, Leonard (September 2, 2014). Leonard Maltin's 2015 Movie Guide. New York: Penguin Group. ISBN 978-0451468499.
- McDonald, Keiko I. (1994). Japanese Classical Theater in Films. London and Toronto: Associated University Presses. ISBN 0838635024.
- McDougal, Stuart Y. (1985). Made into Movies: From Literature to Film. Holt, Rinehart, and Winston. ISBN 9780030638046.
- Phillips, Chelsea (2013). "I Have Given Suck". Shakespeare Expressed: Page, Stage, and Classroom in Shakespeare and His Contemporaries. Rowman & Littlefield. ISBN 978-1611475616.
- Prince, Stephen (1991). The Warrior's Camera: The Cinema of Akira Kurosawa. Princeton University Press. ISBN 978-0691010465.
- Richie, Donald (1998). The Films of Akira Kurosawa. Berkeley, Los Angeles and London: University of California Press. ISBN 0520220374.
- Richie, Donald (1964). "Kurosawa on Kurosawa". Sight & Sound. British Film Institute. Archived from the original on 2019-05-20.
- Ryfle, Steve; Godziszewski, Ed (2017). Ishiro Honda: A Life in Film, from Godzilla to Kurosawa. Wesleyan University Press. ISBN 9780819570871.
- Schneider, Steven Jay, ed. (2008). 1001 Movies You Must See Before You Die. Quintessence Editions (5th Anniversary/3rd ed.). Hauppauge, New York: Barron's Educational Series. ISBN 978-0-7641-6151-3.
- Takase, Masahiro (January 15, 2003). Stories from Inside Toho Studios: The Era of Toshiro Mifune (in Japanese). Toho Publishing. ISBN 978-4924609822.
- Tsuzuki, Masaaki (2010). The Complete Works and Life of Akira Kurosawa (in Japanese). Iwanami Shoten. ISBN 9784487804344.
- Usui, Yoshimi, ed. (January 20, 1959). The World of Mass and Comic. Complete Works of Contemporary Culture (in Japanese). Vol. 5. Chikuma Shobō. ASIN B000JBG5L8.
- Watson, Robert N. (2020). Throne of Blood. BFI Film Classics. London: Bloomsbury Publishing. ISBN 9781839021886.
- Yoshimoto, Mitsuhiro (2000). Kurosawa: Film Studies and Japanese Cinema. Duke University Press. ISBN 0822325195.
- Zinoman, Jason (2011). "He Likes to Watch". Shock Value: How a Few Eccentric Outsiders Gave Us Nightmares, Conquered Hollywood, and Invented Modern Horror. New York: The Penguin Press. ISBN 978-1-59420-302-2.
