= The Bad Sleep Well =

1960 film by Akira Kurosawa

- Theatrical release poster
- Directed by: Akira Kurosawa
- Written by: Hideo Oguni; Eijirō Hisaita; Akira Kurosawa; Ryūzō Kikushima; Shinobu Hashimoto
- Based on: Hamlet by William Shakespeare (uncredited)
- Produced by: Akira Kurosawa; Tomoyuki Tanaka
- Starring: Toshiro Mifune; Masayuki Mori; Kyōko Kagawa; Tatsuya Mihashi; Takashi Shimura
- Cinematography: Yuzuru Aizawa
- Edited by: Akira Kurosawa
- Music by: Masaru Sato
- Production companies: Toho Studios; Kurosawa Productions
- Distributed by: Toho
- Release date: September 19, 1960
- Running time: 151 minutes
- Country: Japan
- Language: Japanese
- Budget: ¥82.54 million
- Box office: ¥52.28 million

The Bad Sleep Well (Japanese: 悪い奴ほどよく眠る, Hepburn: Warui Yatsu Hodo Yoku Nemuru; lit. 'The worse they are, the better they sleep') is a 1960 Japanese neo-noir crime mystery film directed by Akira Kurosawa. It was the first film to be produced under Kurosawa's own independent production company. It was entered into the 11th Berlin International Film Festival.

The film stars Toshiro Mifune as a young man who gets a prominent position in a corrupt postwar Japanese company to expose the men responsible for his father's death. It draws upon Shakespeare's Hamlet, while doubling as a critique of corporate corruption. It is one of four films, along with Drunken Angel (1948), Stray Dog (1949) and High and Low (1963), in which Kurosawa explores the film noir genre. Like Kurosawa's next two movies with Mifune, Yojimbo (1961) and Sanjuro (1962), Mifune's character is "a lone hero fighting against overwhelming odds and corrupt authorities."

== Plot ==
A group of news reporters watch and gossip at an elaborate wedding reception held by the Public Development Corporation's Vice President Iwabuchi, who married his daughter Yoshiko to his secretary Koichi Nishi. The police interrupt the wedding to arrest corporate assistant officer Wada, the reception's master of ceremony, on charges of bribery in a kickback scheme. The reporters comment on similarity to an earlier scandal involving Iwabuchi, administrative officer Moriyama, and contract officer Shirai that was hushed up after the suicide of Assistant Chief Furuya, who had jumped from a seventh-story window of the corporate office building, bringing the investigation to a dead end before any of the company's higher-ups could be implicated. Following the wedding, the police question Wada and accountant Miura about bribery between Dairyu Construction Company and the government-funded Public Corporation.

Following the inquiry, Miura commits suicide by running in front of a truck when about to be arrested. Wada attempts to take his own life by jumping into an active volcano but is stopped by Nishi. To convince Wada to help him and his best friend Itakura in their agenda of revenge, Nishi then drives Wada where they both are shown spying on the (pre-scripted) funeral, that reveals to Wada what his employers thought of him. Nishi then focuses his efforts on contract officer Shirai by setting him up so that Iwabuchi and Moriyama believe him to be stealing from them, while also using Wada to drive him insane with guilt. Nishi then saves Shirai from an assassin hired by Iwabuchi before taking him to the office where Furuya died, revealing himself as Furuya's illegitimate son who exchanged identities with Itakura to avenge his father's death. Nishi's interrogation methods shatter what little sanity Shirai had left, with Moriyama deducing that someone connected to Furuya is orchestrating these events as he soon learns the truth about Nishi and informs Iwabuchi. Iwabuchi's son Tatsuo overhears and angrily drives Nishi off when he returns to the house.

Retreating to the ruins of a factory he worked at during World War II, Nishi manages to abduct Moriyama and starves him into revealing the location of evidence he can use to expose the corruption and all involved to the press. In the meantime, Wada slips away and brings back Yoshiko in the hopes that the newlyweds will reconcile. Nishi tells his wife that he has grown to truly love her. Yoshiko accepts the truth about her father's evil deeds and reluctantly agrees to allow Nishi to complete his plans to expose him. But as Nishi calls for a press conference to be held the next day and prepares to retrieve the final evidence, Iwabuchi deduces Yoshiko saw Nishi and tricks her by claiming Tatsuo intends to kill Nishi while promising to turn himself in. She offers to go with Iwabuchi, but he drugs his daughter with wine laced with sleeping pills.

Yoshiko comes to by the time Tatsuo returns home from duck hunting, realizing her father tricked her as they rush to Nishi's location. But they are too late, Itakura revealing that Nishi had been killed, with his murder made to look as though he'd crashed while driving drunk. He also reveals that Wada, Moriyama, and the evidence have all been disposed of. All three are devastated by this development, knowing the truth but having nothing to back up their story. After Iwabuchi cancels Nishi's conference, his children confront him and disown him. Iwabuchi receives a call from his superior and apologizes for the recent trouble while assuring them that he handled it. He then requests retirement, but his superior advises him to take a vacation. Iwabuchi proceeds to hang up after apologizing, as he lost his sense of time from having not slept at all the previous night.

== Cast ==
- Toshiro Mifune as Kōichi Nishi
- Masayuki Mori as Public Corporation Vice President Iwabuchi
- Kyōko Kagawa as Yoshiko Nishi
- Tatsuya Mihashi as Tatsuo Iwabuchi
- Takashi Shimura as Administrative Officer Moriyama
- Kō Nishimura as Contract Officer Shirai
- Takeshi Katō as Itakura
- Kamatari Fujiwara as Assistant-to-the-Chief Wada
- Chishū Ryū as Public Prosecutor Nonaka
- Seiji Miyaguchi as Prosecutor Okakura
- Kōji Mitsui as reporter
- Ken Mitsuda as Public Corporation President Arimura
- Nobuo Nakamura as legal adviser
- Susumu Fujita as detective
- Kōji Nanbara as Prosecutor Horiuchi
- Gen Shimizu as Managing Director Miura
- Natsuko Kahara as Furuya's wife
- Kunie Tanaka as hit man

== Production ==
After Toho Studios had grown frustrated with Kurosawa going overbudget during filming of The Hidden Fortress, in 1959 the director formed his own film company, Kurosawa Productions. Believing that making his first independent film merely for commercial success would be insulting to the audience, Kurosawa elected to tackle a subject of social significance.

The idea for The Bad Sleep Well came from Kurosawa's nephew Yoshio Inoue, whose story called "Bad Men's Prosperity" founded Kurosawa's draft. Kurosawa began writing the script with Eijirō Hisaita, whom he had collaborated with on No Regrets for Our Youth and The Idiot, both starring Setsuko Hara. Kurosawa's other writing collaborators Hideo Oguni, Ryūzō Kikushima and Shinobu Hashimoto would later join Kurosawa and Hisaita in the writing process once they were free from other projects. The process of writing the script took 80 days, with care taken to not resemble real-life cases of corruption in Japan.

Filming began on March 22, 1960, with the Navy Yard of Toyohashi, Mount Aso, Marunouchi Building and the Yokohama Prison serving as main locations. To convincingly play the part of a disabled wife, Kyōko Kagawa used uneven shoes and a knee brace. During filming of a car scene, Kagawa suffered facial injuries and considered quitting her acting career. At the hospital where she was being treated, Toshiro Mifune stopped the press from interviewing her by standing in front of her room door.

== Reception ==
Contemporary reviews were positive, with a Bosley Crowther piece in The New York Times from January 1963 calling it "an aggressive and chilling drama of modern-day Japan" which "gives to an ordinary tale of greedy and murderous contention a certain basic philosophical tone". It praises Kurosawa for staging "what amounts to cliches in this type of strongarm fiction in a way that makes them seem fresh and as fully of sardonic humor as though we had never seen their likes before". Dan Schneider considers it one of Kurosawa's finest movies.

The most common criticism of the film among professional reviewers refers to the ending. In a 2006 review of the Criterion Collection DVD release, The A.V. Club's Keith Phipps calls it "an assured, muscular Kurosawa film [...] that it's all the more disappointing when a shapeless, anticlimactic, but probably inevitable ending does it in".

At the 14th Mainichi Film Awards, Masayuki Mori and Masaru Sato won the awards for Best Supporting Actor and Best Music.

American filmmaker Francis Ford Coppola has listed The Bad Sleep Well as one of his favorite films, citing the first thirty minutes of the film "as perfect as any film I've ever seen" and used it as inspiration for the wedding sequence in the 1972 Oscar-winning gangster drama The Godfather.
