= Blue Ribbon Award for Best Screenplay =

Discontinued screenplay award in Japan

- Awarded for: Best Performance by a Screenplay
- Country: Japan
- Presented by: The Association of Tokyo Film Journalists
- First award: 1950
- Final award: 1966

The Blue Ribbon Award for Best Screenplay is a prize recognizing the work of a screenplay of a Japanese film. It was awarded annually by the Association of Tokyo Film Journalists as one of the Blue Ribbon Awards. It was lastly awarded in 1966 at the 17th Blue Ribbon Awards and discontinued.

== List of winners ==
No.	Year	Scriptwriter(s)	Film(s)
1	1950	Akira Kurosawa; Shinobu Hashimoto	Rashomon
2	1951	Sumie Tanaka	Home Sweet Home; Boyhood; Repast
3	1952	Ryōsuke Saitō	Honjitsu kyūshin
4	1953	Keisuke Kinoshita	A Japanese Tragedy; Koibumi; Magokoro; Ai no Sakyū
5	1954	Keisuke Kinoshita	Twenty-Four Eyes; The Garden of Women
6	1955	Ryūzō Kikushima	Otoko Arite; Rokunin no ansatsusha
7	1956	Shinobu Hashimoto	Mahiru no ankoku
8	1957	Ryūzō Kikushima	Kichigai Buraku
9	1958	Shinobu Hashimoto	Harikomi; Iwashigumo
10	1959	Yōko Mizuki	Kiku to Isamu
11	1960	N/A	N/A
12	1961	Zenzo Matsuyama	Na mo Naku Mazushiku Utsukushiku; Futari no Musuko
13	1962	Shinobu Hashimoto	Harakiri
14	1963	Shohei Imamura; Keiji Hasebe	The Insect Woman
15	1964	Takeo Kunihiro	Bakumatsu Zankoku Monogatari
16	1965	Naoyuki Suzuki	A Fugitive from the Past
17	1966	Shinobu Hashimoto	Shiroi Kyotō
