= Runaway Train (film) =

1985 film by Andrei Konchalovsky

- Theatrical release poster
- Directed by: Andrei Konchalovsky
- Screenplay by: Djordje Milicevic; Paul Zindel; Edward Bunker
- Story by: Akira Kurosawa; Hideo Oguni (uncredited); Ryūzō Kikushima(uncredited)
- Produced by: Menahem Golan; Yoram Globus
- Starring: Jon Voight; Eric Roberts; Rebecca De Mornay; Kyle T. Heffner; John P. Ryan; T. K. Carter; Kenneth McMillan
- Cinematography: Alan Hume
- Edited by: Henry Richardson
- Music by: Trevor Jones
- Production companies: Northbrook Films; Golan-Globus Productions
- Distributed by: The Cannon Group, Inc.
- Release dates: December 6, 1985 (Limited); January 17, 1986 (Wide)
- Running time: 110 minutes
- Country: United States
- Language: English
- Budget: $9 million
- Box office: $7.7 million (US)

Runaway Train is a 1985 American disaster action thriller film directed by Andrei Konchalovsky and starring Jon Voight, Eric Roberts, Rebecca De Mornay and John P. Ryan. The screenplay by Djordje Milicevic, Paul Zindel and Edward Bunker was based on an original 1960s screenplay by Akira Kurosawa, with uncredited contributions by frequent Kurosawa collaborators Hideo Oguni and Ryūzō Kikushima. The film was also the feature debut of both Danny Trejo and Tommy "Tiny" Lister, who both proceeded to successful careers as "tough guy" character actors.

Kurosawa intended the original screenplay to be his first color film following Red Beard, but difficulties with the American financial backers led to its being shelved.

The story concerns two escaped convicts and an assistant locomotive driver who are stuck on a runaway train as it barrels through snowy desolate Alaska. Voight and Roberts were both nominated for Academy Awards. Runaway Train received generally positive reviews from critics but was a box office disappointment.

== Plot ==
Oscar "Manny" Manheim is a bank robber and hero to the convicts of Alaska's Stonehaven Maximum Security Prison. After two previous escape attempts, Manny is put in solitary confinement for three years. A court order compels the cruel Warden Ranken to release him from solitary. Planning a third breakout, Manny is forced to move his plan to midwinter after he is stabbed in the hand. Manny recruits young prisoner Buck McGeehy to help in the plan. The two men escape through a sewer tunnel and hike to a switchyard. They steal railroad clothing and board a train consisting only of four locomotives.

The elderly railroad engineer, Al, has a heart attack after starting the train. He attempts to stop it by pulling the conductor's valve before falling dead from the locomotive, but his application of the brakes disables the dead man's switch without cutting the throttle, so the locomotives burn through the brake shoes and keep going. (Note: Though the control inputs shown on screen would be unlikely to cause this scenario, it was inspired by a similar real-life incident.) As the unmanned train accelerates, dispatchers Dave Prince and Frank Barstow are alerted to the situation. Barstow allows the train to reach the mainline while trying to keep the tracks farther down the line clear. The runaway smashes the rear flatbed and caboose of a freight train referred to as Eastbound #12 pulling onto a siding. The collision damages the cab of the lead locomotive and jams the front door of the second engine, an older EMD F-unit. Barstow's superior Eddie McDonald orders him to derail the train.

The train's horn then blows, alerting the authorities (and the two fugitives) that someone else is aboard the train. Barstow has the maintainer cancel the derailment. Ranken concludes his two escaped convicts are fleeing by rail. Meanwhile, the fugitives are discovered by Sara, a locomotive hostler who explains that she sounded the horn and the train is out of control. The train is going too fast for them to jump and can only be stopped from the lead engine, but the streamlined body of the second engine means that its now-unusable front door is the only way to reach the lead engine. They manage to slow the train by disconnecting the multi-unit cables between the second and third engine, shutting down the rear two locomotives.

The dispatchers realize that the main line will take the train through a tight curve near a chemical plant, where its excessive speed would cause a disastrous derailment. Reluctantly, they divert the runaway onto a dead-end branch line, where its derailment would kill only the three on board. Manny tries forcing Buck into a suicidal scramble around the second engine's frozen nose. Sara's intervention on Buck's behalf results in an armed face-off between the convicts. Emotionally broken, all three slump into depression. Ranken arrives in a helicopter and his accomplice is lowered towards the lead engine, but he falls through the second engine's windscreen and then under the train.

Spurred on by the appearance of his archenemy, Manny makes a perilous leap to the lead engine. He falls off the train but grabs onto the coupler, which crushes his injured hand before he manages to climb back up. Ranken boards the locomotive from the helicopter and confronts Manny, but Manny beats him and handcuffs him inside the engine. The frightened warden demands that Manny stop the train, but Manny has chosen to join Ranken in death rather than return to prison. When reminded of Buck and Sara in the second engine, Manny uncouples the lead engine from the rest of the train, leaving the other three engines to coast to a stop. He waves goodbye as Buck begs him to reconsider, then climbs onto the roof in the freezing snow, stretching his arms wide to embrace his freedom and incoming death. Buck and Manny's fellow inmates mourn in their cells as the lone engine vanishes into the storm.

The film ends with a quote from Shakespeare's Richard III: "No beast so fierce but knows some touch of pity. But I know none, and therefore am no beast."

== Cast ==
- Jon Voight as Oscar "Manny" Manheim
- Eric Roberts as Buck McGeehy
- Rebecca De Mornay as Sara
- Kyle T. Heffner as Frank Barstow
- John P. Ryan as Ranken
- T. K. Carter as Dave Prince
- Kenneth McMillan as Eddie MacDonald
- Stacey Pickren as Ruby
- Walter Wyatt as Conlan
- Edward Bunker as Jonah
- Reid Cruickshanks as Al Turner
- Dan Wray as Fat Con
- Michael Lee Gogin as Short Con
- Carmen Filpi as Signal Maintainer no. 40
- John Bloom as Tall Con
- Norton E. "Hank" Worden as Old Con
- Daniel Trejo as Boxer
- Tiny Lister as Jackson, security guard
- William Tregoe as Rogers (credited as William Tregoe, Jr.)
- Dennis Franz (uncredited) as Cop

== Production ==
=== Akira Kurosawa ===
Akira Kurosawa read an article in a 1963 Life magazine by Warren Young about a runaway train. He thought it would make a good film and contacted Joseph E. Levine about doing an international co-production. In June 1966, Kurosawa announced he would make Runaway Train for Joseph E. Levine's Embassy Pictures. The budget was to be $5.6 million. The script was written by Kurosawa, Hideo Oguni and Ryuzo Kikushima, about two escaped convicts who hide on board a stationary train, only for it to roll away, gradually picking up tremendous speed. Sidney Carroll was hired to adapt Kurosawa's script into English. The film would be shot along tracks between Syracuse and Rochester in New York over 16 weeks in October 1966. Tetsuo Aoyagi would produce and the film would be shot in 70 mm.

Plans to shoot were cancelled at the last minute, only to be scheduled and cancelled yet again. In April 1967 the project had been "indefinitely postponed" and Kurosawa signed to make Tora! Tora! Tora!.

=== Development ===
In 1982, the Nippon Herald company, which owned Kurosawa's script, asked Francis Ford Coppola to recommend a director. Coppola and his producer, Tom Luddy, suggested Andrei Konchalovsky. The director succeeded in raising finance from Cannon Films.

"The design is still Kurosawa's", said Konchalovsky. "The concentration of energy and passion, the existential point of view, and the image of the train as something – perhaps civilization – out of control.... Manny, the character played by Voight, feels, 'Win or lose, what's the difference?' That's not very familiar to the Western mind. We tend to love winners, and we don't like losers."

Konchalovsky knew Jon Voight, who had helped get the director his visa to work in the US in 1979 (Voight wanted Konchalovsky to direct Rhinestone Heights which was ultimately never made.)

Karen Allen was announced as the female lead. The part ended up being played by Rebecca De Mornay, who said "It's my first real action-oriented picture. There are scenes where I'm walking across the top of a train – things like that. I really wanted to do something that called for a lot of physical acting, where I'm acting not as much with words as with my body."

Danny Trejo was cast after he arrived on set in his role as a drug abuse counselor for a young person working with the crew who was troubled by the rampant cocaine abuse on set. Screenwriter-consultant Edward Bunker remembered Trejo from when they'd both been imprisoned at San Quentin State Prison, and helped Trejo get hired in a small on-screen role in addition to working as a boxing trainer for Roberts.

The Alaska Railroad decided that their name and logo would not be shown. Several scenes referred to the railroad as "A&E Northern." The filming took place near Portage Glacier, Whittier, and Grandview.

=== Shooting ===
Principal photography began spring of 1985, at the Butte, Anaconda, & Pacific Roundhouse in Anaconda, Montana. During filming, the crew realized they didn't have any real snow, due to warm temperatures (a false spring) in the area. They used Christmas tree flocks for fake snow, and they had to keep it from melting on the tracks at the west yard. Cannon Films had to cut short its stay in Anaconda, and they moved onto Deer Lodge, Montana, to film the prison scenes at the Old Montana State Prison. Approximately 200 extras were hired to play prisoners in the scenes. They spent a week filming several scenes at the prison. Finally, the second unit team went to Whittier, Alaska, to film on the Alaska Railroad tracks. The Bridge sequence was filmed on the Seneca Bridge on Placer Creek, about 5 miles (8 km) from Whittier. The scene where the signal maintainer at Jordan makes the switch on the tracks was filmed at Portage, Alaska. The cast and crew went to the Pan-Pacific Auditorium in Los Angeles, to film the interior of the train scenes and the prisoners' escape scene.

The runaway train's lineup in the movie consisted of four Alaska Railroad locomotives, all built by EMD: GP40-2 #3010, F7 #1500, and #1801 and #1810, both GP7s. The latter two locomotives had previously been rebuilt by ARR with low short hoods as opposed to a GP7's original high short hood but were fitted with mock-up high hoods made of plywood for the film, branded with fictional numbers 531 and 812, respectively. Because #1801's cab had been reconstructed prior to filming, the '531' prosthetic hood stood slightly higher than the normal hood height of a GP7 to fit over the locomotive's number board.

The locomotives used in the film have gone their separate ways:

- ARR GP40-2 #3010 is still active on the Alaska Railroad, painted in the new corporate scheme.
- ARR F7 #1500 was retired from service in 1992, and is now at the Museum of Alaska Transportation and Industry Museum in Wasilla, Alaska, as can be seen on the front page of their website MuseumOfAlaska.org.
- ARR GP7 #1810 was sold to the Oregon Pacific Railroad and operated as OP #1810. In 2008, the unit was sold to the Cimarron Valley Railroad and is now permanently coupled to former OP Slug #1010.
- ARR GP7 #1801 was sold to a locomotive leasing company in Kansas City, Missouri, then sold to the Missouri Central Railroad and operated as MOC #1800. The locomotive subsequently appeared in another motion picture, Under Siege 2: Dark Territory, in 1995. MOC became the Central Midland Railroad in 2002. As Central Midland had its own leased power, MOC 1800 was returned to Midwest Locomotive In Kansas City. Shortly after, it was then sold to the Respondek Rail Corp of Granite City, Illinois, and is now used on Respondek's Port Harbor Railroad subsidiary. The unit's identification is RRC #1800. As of 2015, the locomotive has been stored, is out of service, needing wheelwork. A return to service on the Port Harbor Railroad is unlikely, as there is talk about sending the unit to another Respondek Operation.
- The train that was hit by the runaway was led by MRS-1 #1605. This unit had been retired in 1984, one year before filming started. The unit has since been cut up for scrap.
- Sequences set at the rail yard, shot on the Butte, Anaconda and Pacific Railway in Anaconda, Montana, used local locomotives from the BA&P fleet along with former Northern Pacific EMD F9 #7012A, leased from the Mount Rainier Scenic Railroad. The two GP7s and the F9 were fitted with plywood boxes to duplicate the distinctive 'winterization hatches' carried on their Alaskan counterparts.
- BA&P EMD GP38-2 #109, the BA&P locomotive used in the yard scenes as the lead engine in place of ARR #3010, was subsequently sold to the Alaska Railroad and remains in service there as #2002, along with sister unit #2001 (ex-BA&P #108).

=== Accident ===
Richard (Rick) Holley was killed prior to the start of principal photography when the helicopter he was piloting hit power lines while scouting for shoot locations in Alaska. The film is dedicated to him during the closing credits.

== Music ==
USSR Academic Russian Chorus is credited for Antonio Vivaldi's "Gloria". The film was scored by composer Trevor Jones.

== Release ==
=== Box office ===
Runaway Train had its premiere in New York City on November 15, 1985, followed by its limited release in 965 theatres on December 6, 1985. It made $2,601,480 on that weekend. It was released nationwide on January 17, 1986, and was well received by critics, but failed to find an audience. It opened in 8th place on its premiere weekend and failed to make back its production cost. The film also had a premiere in Anaconda, Montana at the Washoe Theater on March 20, 1986. Invitations for the premiere were sent to people from the Department of Commerce, Rarus Railroad, and Cannon Films personnel, as well as Jon Voight, Eric Roberts, and Rebecca De Mornay. However, none of the actors could attend. The film made $7,936,012 worldwide.

=== Critical reception ===
Runaway Train received generally positive reviews, and has an 84% approval rating on Rotten Tomatoes based on 37 reviews, and an average rating of 7.3/10. The website's critical consensus states, "Charging forward with the momentum of a locomotive, Runaway Train makes great use of its adrenaline-fueled premise and star presences of Jon Voight and Eric Roberts". On Metacritic, the film has a weighted average score of 67 out of 100, based on 11 critics, indicating "generally favorable reviews". Janet Maslin, writing for The New York Times, felt that much of the film was absurd but that Jon Voight's performance was excellent, and she credits the film for "crude energy and bravado". In 2010, movie critic Michael Phillips said on his show At the Movies that it was the most under-rated movie of the 1980s. Roger Ebert awarded the film four out of four stars. Ebert wrote the opening prison scenes were well-made but routine, while the film's genius showed in the train sequences with "stunning" action scenes and the contrast between Roberts' "wild man" persona and Voight's "intelligent" convict; DeMornay's "role as an outsider gives them an audience and a mirror."

In 2014, Time Out polled several film critics, directors, actors, and stunt actors to list their top action films. Runaway Train was listed at 64th place out of 100 on this list.

=== Accolades ===
The film was entered into the 1986 Cannes Film Festival.

Award	Category	Nominee	Result
Academy Awards	Best Actor	Jon Voight	Nominated
Academy Awards	Best Supporting Actor	Eric Roberts	Nominated
Academy Awards	Best Film Editing	Henry Richardson	Nominated
ACE Eddie	Best Edited Feature Film	Henry Richardson	Nominated
Cannes Film Festival	Palme d'Or	Andrei Konchalovsky	Nominated
Golden Globe Awards	Best Motion Picture – Drama	Menahem Golan and Yoram Globus	Nominated
Golden Globe Awards	Best Actor – Motion Picture Drama	Jon Voight	Won
Golden Globe Awards	Best Supporting Actor – Motion Picture	Eric Roberts	Nominated
Motion Picture Sound Editors	Golden Reel Award for Best; Sound Editing – Foreign Feature		Won
Stuntman Awards	Best Vehicular Stunt (Feature Film)	Terry Jackson	Nominated

== Influence ==
Speed, a 1994 Hollywood film with a runaway bus, was inspired by Runaway Train. Screenwriter Graham Yost was told by his father, Canadian television host Elwy Yost, about Runaway Train, and that it was about a train that speeds out of control. Elwy mistakenly believed that the train's situation was due to a bomb on board. Such a theme had in fact been used in The Bullet Train. After seeing the Voight film, Graham decided that it would have been better if there had been a bomb on board a bus with the bus being forced to travel at 20 miles per hour (32 km/h) to prevent an actual explosion. A friend suggested that this be increased to 50 miles per hour (80 km/h).
