= Gondola no Uta =

1915 Japanese romantic ballad

Gondola no Uta (ゴンドラの唄; "The Gondola Song") is a 1915 romantic ballad that was popular in Taishō period Japan. Lyrics were written by Isamu Yoshii, melody by Shinpei Nakayama. The lyrics of the song are presented as the advice of an experienced individual to younger souls regarding the fleeting nature of youth and the caution against missing the opportunities of youth when they are available and before they have passed with growing age.

== Lyrics ==
Lyrics in Kanji and Hiragana:

命短し
恋せよ少女
朱き唇
褪せぬ間に
熱き血潮の
冷えぬ間に
明日の月日の
ないものを

命短し
恋せよ少女
いざ手をとりて
彼の舟に
いざ燃ゆる頬を
君が頬に
ここには誰れも
来ぬものを

命短し
恋せよ少女
波に漂う
舟の様に
君が柔手を
我が肩に
ここには人目も
無いものを

命短し
恋せよ少女
黒髪の色
褪せぬ間に
心のほのお
消えぬ間に
今日はふたたび
来ぬものを

In rōmaji:

inochi mijikashi
koi seyo otome
akaki kuchibiru
asenu ma ni
atsuki chishio no
hienu ma ni
asu no tsukihi no
nai mono wo

inochi mijikashi
koi seyo otome
iza te wo torite
ka no fune ni
iza moyuru ho wo
kimiga ho ni
koko ni wa dare mo
konu mono wo

inochi mijikashi
koi seyo otome
nami ni tadayou
fune no yo ni
kimiga yawate wo
waga kata ni
koko niwa hitome mo
nai mono wo

inochi mijikashi
koi seyo otome
kurokami no iro
asenu ma ni
kokoro no honoo
kienu ma ni
kyou wa futatabi
konu mono wo

In English:

life is brief
fall in love, maidens
before the crimson bloom
fades from your lips
before the tides of passion
cool within you,
for there is no such thing
as tomorrow, after all

life is brief
fall in love, maidens
before his hands
take up his boat
before the flush of
his cheeks fades
for there is not a person
who comes hither

life is brief
fall in love, maidens
before the boat drifts away
on the waves
before the hand resting on your shoulder
becomes frail
for there is no reach here
for the sight of others

life is brief
fall in love, maidens
before the raven tresses
begin to fade
before the flames in your hearts
flicker and die
for today, once passed,
is never to come again

== Music ==
The music is written in three quarter time as a melancholy waltz in a major key played to a slow meter. Its structure is written to accompany four poetic stanzas where the first two verses of each stanza serve as a refrain throughout the entire song.

== In popular culture ==
It was used as a theme song in Akira Kurosawa's 1952 film Ikiru. The terminally ill protagonist, played by Takashi Shimura, initially sings this romantic ballad as an expression of loss, and at the end with great contentment. His final performance of the song has been described as "iconic."

The song is also referenced in the Japanese manga titled Fushigi Yûgi: Genbu Kaiden.

This music is also used in a Japanese drama titled Haikei, Chichiue-sama.

The song is sung in Clemens Klopfenstein's film Macao (1988).

The song was also used in the Japanese TV show titled Otomen.

The line "fall in love maidens" (Koi seyo otome) is used as the subtitle of the video game Sakura Wars 4.

From the song, the phrase "Life is short, fall in love, maidens..." (Inochi mijikashi, koi seyo otome...) gained some popularity during the 1990s in Japan. Especially the phrase "Koi Seyo Otome" has been used as the title for several songs and a Japanese television drama.

In the anime series Kirby: Right Back at Ya!, Episode 42, King Dedede sings a version of the famous phrase "Life is short, fall in love, maidens..." (Inochi mijikashi, koi seyo otome...) but replaces "otome" with his own name, "Dedede". He sings this song on a swing set he built similar to the one in the film. However, this was only in the original version and was not translated into English.

The lyrics of the song were used in the novel Boogiepop and Others, as the leitmotif of Kamikishiro Naoko, one of the characters.

In the anime Kitsutsuki Tanteidokoro (Woodpecker Detective's Office), the song was recreated by the group "Now On Air" with mostly similar lyrics.

In the game Bungō to Alchemist (Bungo and Alchemist), character Yoshii Isamu (based on the real-life poet who wrote the lyrics of the song) recites the famous phrase, "Life is short, fall in love, maidens..." (Inochi mijikashi, koi seyo otome...) as one of the log in lines that plays when a player logs into the game.

== See also ==
- Carpe diem
