= Shinobu Hashimoto =

Japanese screenwriter (1918–2018)

- 橋本 忍
- Hashimoto in 1959
- Born: 18 April 1918; Hyōgo, Japan
- Died: 19 July 2018 (aged 100); Tokyo, Japan
- Occupations: Film director, screenwriter, film producer

Shinobu Hashimoto (橋本 忍, Hashimoto Shinobu; 18 April 1918 – 19 July 2018) was a Japanese screenwriter, director and producer. A frequent collaborator of Akira Kurosawa, he wrote the scripts for critically acclaimed films such as Rashomon and Seven Samurai, as well as the Samurai films Harakiri (1962) and Hitokiri (released in the US as Tenchu!) (1969).

== Early life ==
Shinobu Hashimoto was born in Hyōgo Prefecture on 18 April 1918. In 1938, he enlisted in the army, but became ill with tuberculosis while still training and spent four years in a veterans' sanitarium.

== Career ==
While hospitalized, another patient gave Hashimoto a film magazine. The magazine sparked his interest in screenwriting and he began a screenplay about his army experience, spending three years on the project.

Hashimoto was a frequent collaborator with Akira Kurosawa, from 1950 to 1970 writing eight screenplays Kurosawa directed. He often worked with Hideo Oguni, Ryūzō Kikushima as well as Kurosawa himself on the scripts for those projects. Hashimoto won numerous awards for his writing, including a succession of Blue Ribbon Awards and Mainichi Film Awards, particularly in the 1950s and 1960s. Hashimoto wrote more than eighty screenplays, including Rashomon, Ikiru, Seven Samurai (1950), Throne of Blood (a 1957 adaptation of Macbeth set in Japan), and The Hidden Fortress (1958). He also directed three films.

Achieving international acclaim, Hashimoto's scripts inspired notable films abroad, including The Magnificent Seven (1960 and then remade again in 2016), a remake of Seven Samurai, and Star Wars (1977), which George Lucas has described as inspired by The Hidden Fortress.

In 2006, he authored a memoir entitled Compound Cinematics: Akira Kurosawa and I. In 2008, Hashimoto wrote a screenplay for I Want to Be a Shellfish, a second full-length film adaptation of the post-World War II-based television series he wrote for Tokyo Broadcasting System Television in 1958.

== Later life and death ==
Hashimoto turned 100 in April 2018. He died in Tokyo on 19 July 2018 at the age of 100. In a tribute article for TIME, film director Antoine Fuqua expressed his respect for Hashimoto as a screenwriter stating: "(Hashimoto's) … working with Akira Kurosawa and Hideo Oguni, was so beautiful and poetic and powerful and heartbreaking. It was all about justice, it was all about sacrifice, and it made me want to be one of those guys".

== Awards and honors ==
- 1950: Blue Ribbon Award for Best Screenplay for Rashomon
- 1952: Mainichi Film Award for Best Screenplay for Ikiru
- 1956: Mainichi Film Award for Best Screenplay for Mahiru no ankoku
- 1956: Blue Ribbon Awards for Best Screenplay for Mahiru no ankoku
- 1958: Mainichi Film Award for Best Screenplay for Summer Clouds, Stakeout, and Night Drum
- 1958: Blue Ribbon Awards for Best Screenplay for Summer Clouds and Stakeout
- 1958: Kinema Junpo's Best Screenwriter Award for The Hidden Fortress
- 1960: Mainichi Film Award for Best Screenplay for Black Art Book (ja:黒い画集)
- 1962: Blue Ribbon Award for Best Screenplay for Harakiri
- 1966: Mainichi Film Award for Best Screenplay for Shiroi Kyotō
- 1974: Mainichi Film Award for Best Screenplay for Castle of Sand
- 2015: Mainichi Film Award Special Prize for screenwriting

== Filmography ==
Hashimoto is credited in the making of at least 85 films.

== See also ==
- List of centenarians (actors, filmmakers and entertainers)
