= Minoru Chiaki =

Japanese actor (1917–1999)

- 千秋 実
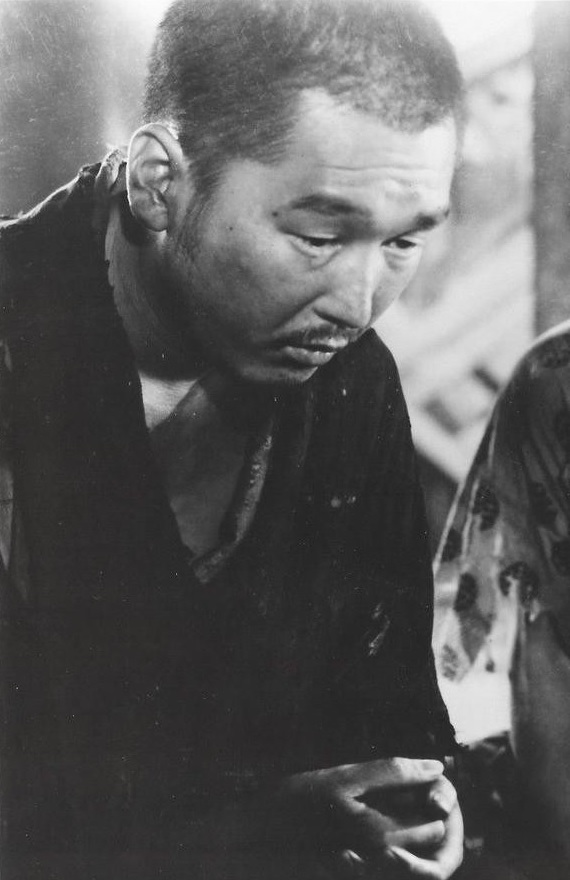
- Chiaki in a press photo from Rashomon (1950)
- Born: Katsuji Sasaki; April 28, 1917; Onnenai, Nakagawa, Kamikawa, Hokkaidō, Japan
- Died: November 1, 1999 (aged 82); Fuchu, Tokyo, Japan
- Occupation: Actor
- Years active: 1949–1999
- Spouse: Fumie Sasaki
- Children: Katsuhiko Sasaki

Minoru Chiaki (Japanese: 千秋 実, Hepburn: Chiaki Minoru; April 28, 1917 – November 1, 1999) was a Japanese actor who appeared in eleven of Akira Kurosawa's films, including Rashomon, Seven Samurai, Throne of Blood, and The Hidden Fortress. He was also one of Kon Ichikawa's favourite actors.

He attended, but did not graduate from, Chuo University. Later in his career, he appeared as a secondary actor in many Toei films. In 1986, he won the Best Actor at the Japan Academy Prize ceremony for his performance in Gray Sunset (1985).

He died of cardiac and pulmonary failure at age 82. His son Katsuhiko Sasaki is also an actor.

== Filmography ==
=== Film ===
- Stray Dog (1949) – Girlie Show director
- Rashōmon (1950) – Priest
- Nanairo no hana (1950) – Tahei Izumi
- Koi no Oranda-zaka (1951) – Suekichi
- The Idiot (1951) – Mutsuo Kayama, the secretary
- Araki Mataemon: Kettô kagiya no tsuji (1952)
- Mōjū tsukai no shōjo (1952)
- Bijo to touzoku (1952) – Takeichi no Takamaru
- Kyô wa kaisha no gekkyûbi (1952) – Chief of General Affairs
- Ikiru (1952) – Noguchi
- Mogura yokochô (1953)
- Seven Samurai (1954) – Heihachi Hayashida, one of the samurai
- Shunkin monogatari (1954) – Teizo
- Kakute yume ari (1954) – Sensuke Nasu
- Saizansu nitôryû (1954) – Kojirô Sasaki / Daijirô – His son / Danjûrô – Travelling actor
- Godzilla Raids Again (1955) – Kobayashi
- Ryanko no Yatarô (1955) – Gozematsu
- Kaettekita wakadan'na (1955) – Igarashi
- I Live in Fear (1955) – Jiro Nakajima
- Jirochô yûkyôden: amagi garasu (1955)
- Samurai III: Duel at Ganryu Island (1956) – Sasuke the boatman
- Kyûketsu-ga (1956) – Sango Kawase
- A Wife's Heart (1956) – Zenichi
- Narazu-mono (1956) – Sobei
- Gendai no yokubô (1956) – Mikami
- Oshidori no mon (1956)
- Oshaberi shacho (1957)
- Throne Of Blood (1957) – Yoshiaki Miki
- Ujô (1957) - Kenkichi Tanabe
- Sanjûrokunin no jôkyaku (1957) – Motohashi – Drug Salesman
- Hikage no musume (1957)
- Tôhoku no zunmu-tachi (1957) – Tasuke
- The Lower Depths (1957) – Tonosama – the former Samurai
- Hadairo no tsuki (1957) – Umekichi Ishikura
- Ninjutsu suikoden inazuma kotengu (1958)
- Futari dake no hashi (1958) – Kaikichi Ishida
- Anzukko (1958) – Saburo Yoshida
- Uguisu-jô no hanayome (1958)
- Hana no bojô (1958) – Fukuzô Yanami
- The Hidden Fortress (1958) – Tahei
- Oshaberi okusan (1959)
- Sengoku gunto-den (1959) – Jibu
- Naniwa no koi no monogatari (1959)
- Anyakôro (1959) – Nobuyuki Tokito
- The Human Condition (1959) – Onodera Heichô
- Sâtsu rarete tama ruka (I) (1960)
- Mito Komon 3: All Star Version (1960)
- Case of a Young Lord 8 (1960) – Sasajima Toshizo
- Shinran (1960) – Seizenbo
- Yôtô monogatari: hana no Yoshiwara hyakunin-giri (1960) – Jôsuke
- Shirakoya Komako (1960) – Matashirô
- Zoku shinran (1960)
- Yatarô gasa (1960) – Kichitaro
- Gen to fudômyô-ô (1961)
- Hadakakko (1961) – Sandwich man
- Ashita aru kagiri (1962)
- The Inheritance (1962) - Junichi Fujii
- Amakusa Shirô Tokisada (1962) – Sôho Tanaka
- Love Under the Crucifix
- Chiisakobe (1962) – Dairoku
- Kigeki: Detatoko shôbu – 'Chinjarara monogatari' yori (1962) – Tarô Yamada
- Hibari Chiemi no Yaji Kita Dochu (1963)
- Hibari Chiemi no oshidori senryô gasa (1963)
- High and Low (1963) – Journalist
- Uogashi no sempû musume (1963)
- Gobanchô yûgirirô (1963) – Takematsu
- Brave Records of the Sanada Clan (1963) – Yukimura Sanada
- Rojingai no kaoyaku (1963) – Fujimura Genzaemon
- The Body (1964) – Sasaki
- Samé (1964) – Shirosa
- Kono sora no aru kagiri (1964) – Ryûtarô Nogami
- Taking The Castle (1965) – Sanai
- Hiya-meshi to Osan to Chan (1965) – Nakagawa (episode 1)
- Zero faita dai kûsen (1966)
- The Face of Another (1966) – Apartment Superintendent
- Lake of Tears (1966) – Kidayu Momose
- Hatamoto yakuza (1966)
- Ai no Sanka (1967) – The Ship-master
- Sei no kigen (1967) – Girl's father
- Nippon ichi no danzetsu otoko (1969) – Shimizu
- Yoru no isoginchaku (1970) – Pastor
- Karafuto 1945 Summer Hyosetsu no mon (1974) – Planter
- Kyojin-gun monogatari: Susume eikô e (1977)
- Tokugawa ichizoku no houkai (1980)
- Gray Sunset (Hana Ichimonme) (1985) – Fuyukichi Takano
- Don Matsugorô no daibôken (1987) – Amenomori Seikai (final film role)

=== Television ===
- Kunitori Monogatari (1973) – Oda Nobuhide
- Edo no Kaze (1975)
- Sekigahara (1981) – Yamauchi Kazutoyo

== Honours ==
- Order of the Sacred Treasure, 4th Class, Gold Rays with Rosette (1989)
