= Ikiru =

1952 Japanese drama film by Akira Kurosawa

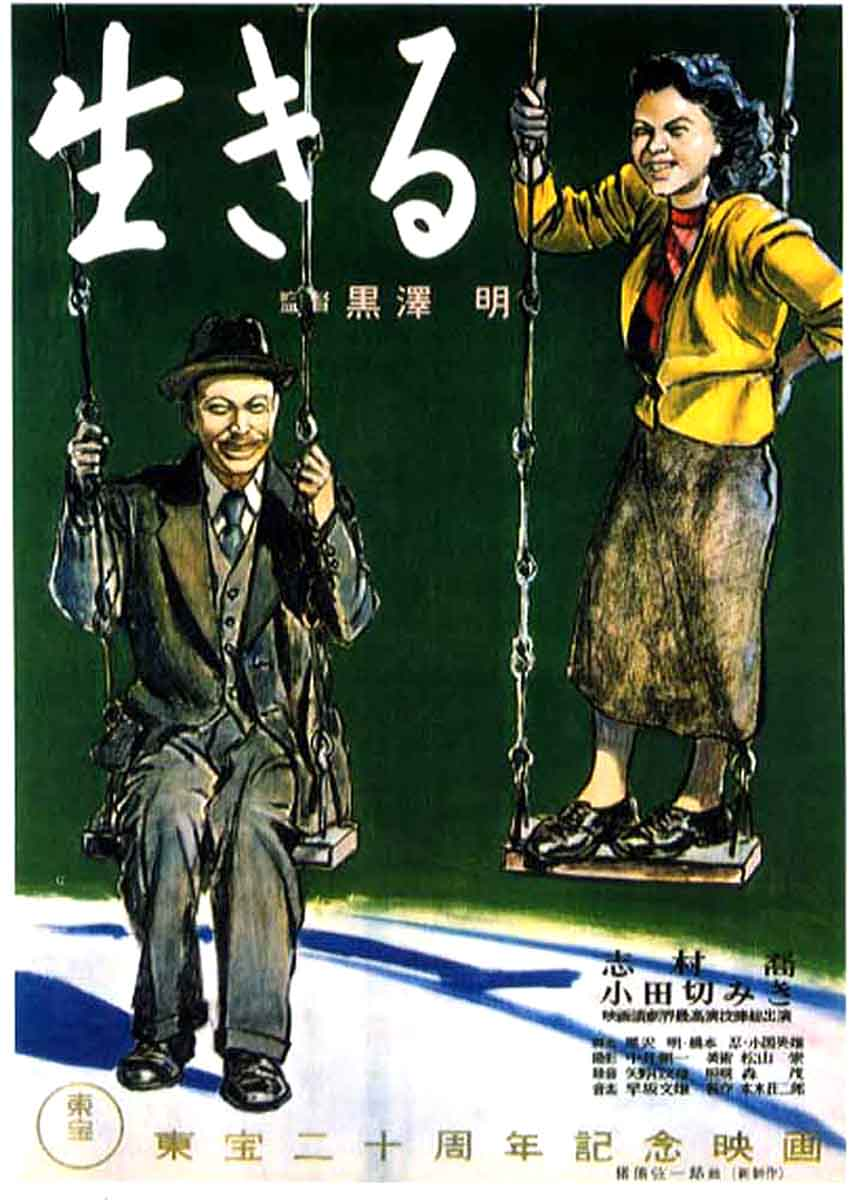
- Theatrical release poster
- Directed by: Akira Kurosawa
- Screenplay by: Akira Kurosawa; Shinobu Hashimoto; Hideo Oguni
- Produced by: Sōjirō Motoki
- Starring: Takashi Shimura; Miki Odagiri
- Cinematography: Asakazu Nakai
- Edited by: Kōichi Iwashita
- Music by: Fumio Hayasaka
- Production company: Toho
- Distributed by: Toho
- Release date: October 9, 1952 (Japan)
- Running time: 143 minutes
- Country: Japan
- Language: Japanese
- Budget: $85,000

Ikiru (Japanese: 生きる; 'To Live') is a 1952 Japanese drama film directed by Akira Kurosawa from a screenplay co-written with Shinobu Hashimoto and Hideo Oguni. The film examines the struggles of a terminally ill Tokyo bureaucrat (played by Takashi Shimura) and his final quest for meaning. The screenplay was partly inspired by Leo Tolstoy's 1886 novella The Death of Ivan Ilyich.

The film's major themes include learning how to live, the inefficiency of bureaucracy, and decaying family life in Japan, which have been the subject of analysis by academics and critics. It won awards for Best Film at the Kinema Junpo and Mainichi Film Awards and is widely considered one of the greatest films of all time. Ikiru is regarded by some as Kurosawa's masterpiece alongside his following film, Seven Samurai.

== Plot ==
Kanji Watanabe has worked in the same monotonous, bureaucratic position in the Tokyo public works department for thirty years and is close to retirement. His wife is dead, and his married son, Mitsuo, lives with him only so he can legally claim his estate upon death. At work, Watanabe is a witness to constant bureaucratic inaction. In one case, a group of parents who simply want permission to drain a cesspool so they can install a playground are endlessly sent back and forth between different offices in the same building.

After learning he has stomach cancer and has less than a year to live, Watanabe attempts to come to terms with his impending death. He plans to tell Mitsuo about the cancer but decides against it when his son does not pay attention to him. The old man explores the pleasures of Tokyo's nightlife, guided by an eccentric novelist whom he has just met. In a nightclub, Watanabe requests a song from the piano player, and sings "Gondola no Uta" (transl. Life is Brief) with great sadness. His singing greatly affects those watching him. Eventually, he realizes that hedonistic pleasure is only a distraction, not a solution.

The following day, Watanabe encounters Toyo, a young female subordinate, who needs his signature on her resignation. He takes comfort in observing her joyous love of life and enthusiasm and tries to spend as much time as possible with her. She eventually becomes suspicious of his intentions and grows wary of him.

After persuading her to join him for the last time, he opens up and asks for the secret to her love of life. She says that she does not know, but that she found happiness in her new job making toys, which makes her feel as if she is playing with all the children of Japan. Inspired, Watanabe decides that he should do something meaningful with his job. He surprises everyone by returning to work after a long absence and begins pushing for the playground project, overcoming concerns that he is intruding on the jurisdiction of other departments.

Watanabe dies months later, and at his wake, his former co-workers gather after the opening of the playground to figure out what caused such a dramatic change in his behavior. As they drink, they slowly realize Watanabe must have known he was dying, even when his son denies this truth, as he was unaware of his father's condition. They also hear from a witness that, in the last few moments in Watanabe's life, he sat on the swing at the park he built, singing "Gondola no Uta" as the snow fell. The bureaucrats vow to honor Watanabe's memory by following his example yet fall back into the same patterns as before the second they return to their offices, except for one. The film ends with this specific bureaucrat overlooking children frolicking in the new playground and admiring the sky, just like Watanabe.

== Cast ==
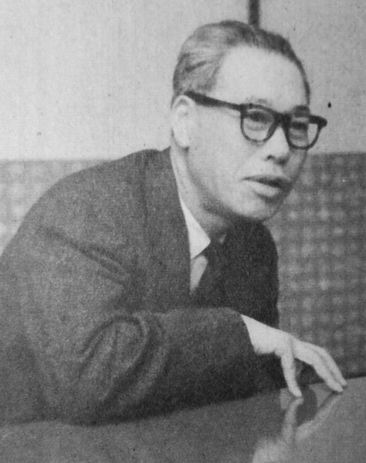
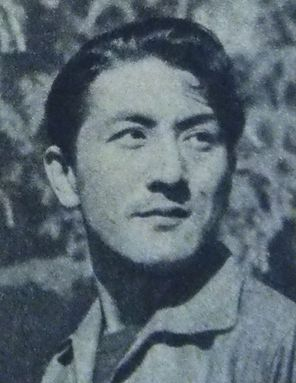
Takashi Shimura and Haruo Tanaka have starring roles.
- Takashi Shimura as Kanji Watanabe
- Shinichi Himori as Kimura
- Haruo Tanaka as Sakai
- Minoru Chiaki as Noguchi
- Bokuzen Hidari as Ohara
- Miki Odagiri as Toyo Odagiri, employee
- Kamatari Fujiwara as Sub-Section Chief Ōno
- Nobuo Nakamura as Deputy Mayor
- Yūnosuke Itō as Novelist
- Minosuke Yamada as Subordinate Clerk Saito
- Makoto Kobori as Kiichi Watanabe, Kanji's brother
- Nobuo Kaneko as Mitsuo Watanabe, Kanji's son
- Kyoko Seki as Kazue Watanabe, Mitsuo's wife
- Kumeko Urabe as Tatsu Watanabe, Kiichi's wife
- Atsushi Watanabe as Patient
- Noriko Honma as Housewife

== Production ==
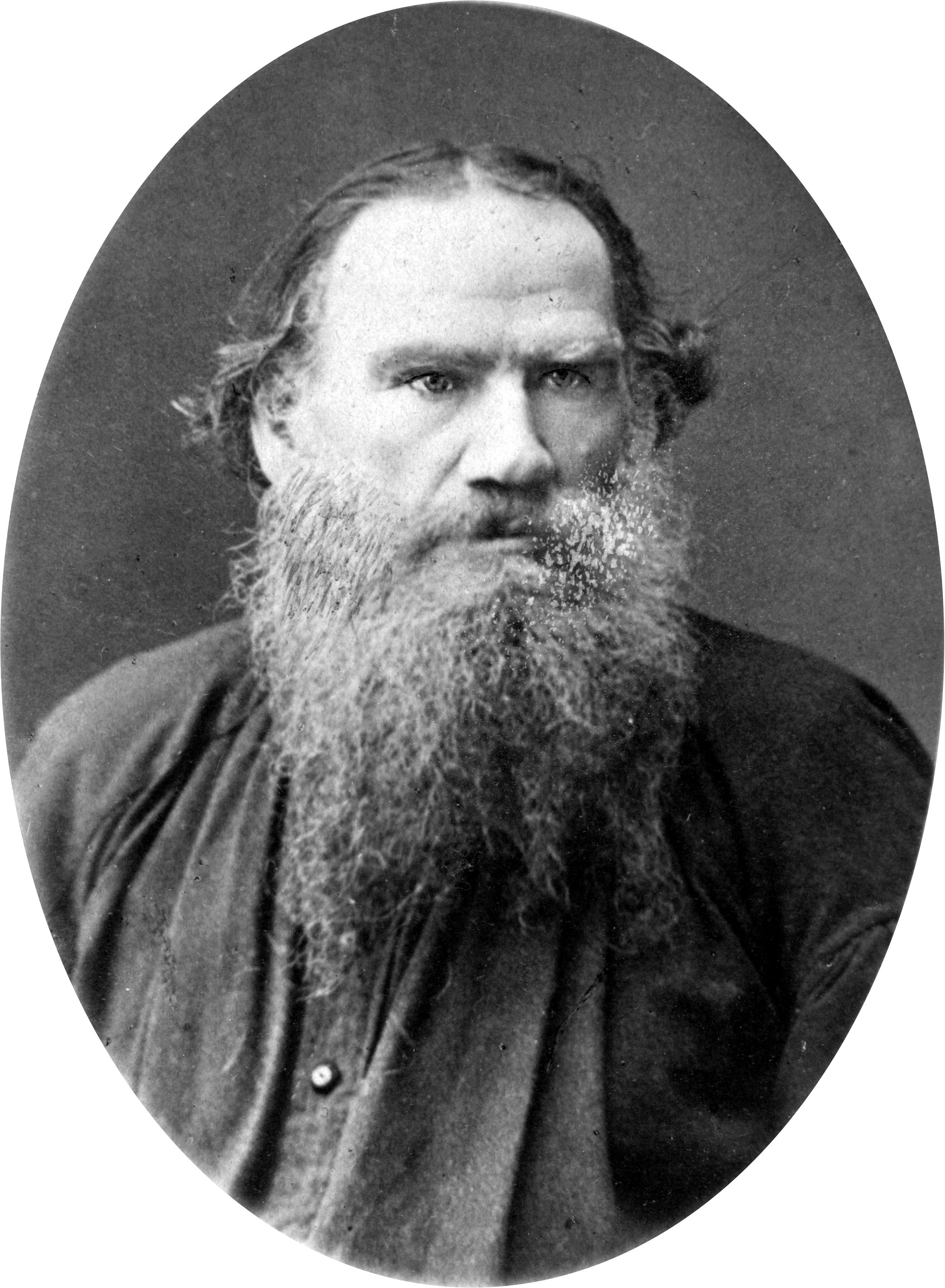
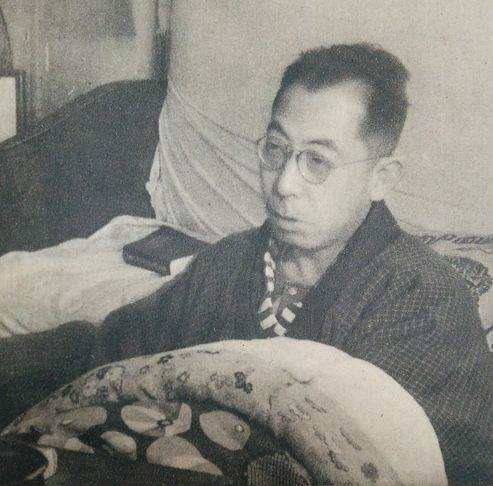
Leo Tolstoy's The Death of Ivan Ilyich was an inspiration for the screenplay, co-written by Hideo Oguni.

Ikiru's screenplay was co-written by Akira Kurosawa, Shinobu Hashimoto, and Hideo Oguni. The film marked the first collaboration between director Kurosawa and screenwriter Oguni. According to Oguni, the genesis of the film was Kurosawa's desire to make a film about a man who knows he is going to die and who wants a reason to live in his remaining days. Kurosawa said that the film originated from his meditations on death and wanting to create a film on contemporary Japan. Initially, Kurosawa told Hashimoto that a man who was set to die in 75 days had to be the theme and that the character's career was less important. Having the character as a criminal, homeless man or government minister would be acceptable.

The screenwriters consulted Leo Tolstoy's novella The Death of Ivan Ilyich, which Kurosawa wanted to use as the film's basis. In the film's first draft, Hashimoto set the death of Watanabe in the film conclusion. Oguni then changed the film's structure to place Watanabe's death halfway through the film. Kurosawa renamed the draft The Life of Kanji Watanabe to Ikiru, which Hashimoto found pretentious, but Oguni supported. The screenplay was completed on 5 February 1952. Preparations and rehearsals began in mid-January 1952, and filming began on March 14. After a summer vacation for Toho employees that began on early June, filming resumed on June 17 and concluded in mid-September of the same year.

Kurosawa dictated the scene where Watanabe is on the swing and mentioned the beginning lyrics of "Gondola no Uta." Because none of the men were familiar with the song, they consulted their eldest receptionist on the rest of the lyrics and the song title. The company vice president at Toho found the scenes in the office after Watanabe's funeral as unnecessary in the film's critique of bureaucracy, which Kurosawa refused to remove.

== Themes ==
=== Meaning of life ===
Death is a major theme in the film, which leads to the protagonist Watanabe's quest to find the meaning of life. Initially, Watanabe looks to nightclubs and women to live life to the fullest, but winds up singing the 1915 song "Gondola no Uta" as an expression of loss and an assertion of himself. Watanabe's singing of "Gondola no Uta", a Taishō era ballad, in a nightclub also portrays his sensibilities to an "older and arguably more wholesome era" of opportunities before the Great Depression, and his realization that "pleasure is not life". After his awakening, the singing of "Happy Birthday to You" symbolizes his rebirth. Because Toyo is young, she has the best insight as to how to live, and she is presented as the "unlikely savior" in Watanabe's "redemption."

Author Donald Richie wrote that the title of the film, meaning simply "to live," could signify that "existence is enough." However, Watanabe finds existence is painful, and he takes this idea as inspiration, wanting to ensure his life has not been futile. The justification of his life, found in his park, is how Watanabe discovered how "to live." In the end, Watanabe now sings "Gondola no Uta" with great contentment.

=== Bureaucracy ===
Ikiru is also an "indictment of Japanese bureaucracy." Historian David Conrad has remarked on its portrayal of Japanese governance after a 7-year American occupation, which relied on bureaucratic systems. Salarymen in post-war Japan were expected to work predictably in accordance with an organization's rules. The scene where the mothers first visit the city office requesting a playground shows "unconcern" in the bureaucrats, who send the visitors on a "farcical runaround," then ask them for a written request, with paperwork in the film as symbols of "meaningless activity." However, Watanabe uses the bureaucracy to forge his legacy, and apparently he is not disturbed when the bureaucracy quickly forgets he drove the project to build the playground.

Japanese health care is depicted as overly bureaucratic in the film when Watanabe visits a clinic in a "poignant" scene. The doctor is portrayed as paternalistic, and Watanabe does not stand up to his authority. Moreover, Conrad and writer Pico Iyer suggest that the doctor's indirect statement reflects a cultural preference for doctors to report negative news obliquely to patients.

=== Family life ===
Author Timothy Iles writes that, as with Yasujirō Ozu's 1953 film Tokyo Story, Ikiru may hold a negative view about the state of family life in modern Japan. Watanabe has lived with his son for years, but they have fallen out of any true relationship. His son Mitsuo sees Watanabe as a bother and regards him as only an obstacle to his obtaining the money from Watanabe's will. The children fall short of their responsibility to respect their parents.

Urbanization may be a reason for negative changes in Japanese society, but a reason for Watanabe and Mitsuo's drift is Watanabe's preoccupation with work. Another reason is Watanabe's not being with Mitsuo during a medical treatment when the boy was 10, which fits a pattern in Kurosawa's films of sons being overly harsh to their fathers. Through scenes with Toyo and Mitsuo, the film seems to portray that the absorption of the young generation in material life has led to indifference to their parents' sacrifices.

== Release ==
In Japan, Toho released Ikiru on 9 October 1952. The film was screened in the 1954 Berlin International Film Festival.

In the United States, the film was shown for a short time in California in 1956 under the title Doomed. It opened as Ikiru in New York City on 29 January 1960. Brandon Films released the film New York. The president of Brandon Films held a press conference on the day of release and claimed that US customs officials had detained his copy of the film after the inspector "questioned a scene or two". A customs spokesman responded that Brandon "was looking for publicity", and the film was released uncut. The film poster featured the stripper seen briefly in the film rather than Watanabe.

Toho carried out a 4K restoration of Ikiru, along with Seven Samurai (1954). As the original negatives of Ikiru could not be located, the transfer was made using a master positive and duplicate negative elements.

=== Critical reception ===
Takashi Shimura as Kanji Watanabe in the iconic scene

The film won critical approval upon its release. Bosley Crowther, writing for The New York Times, called it "a strangely fascinating and affecting film, up to a point—that being the point where it consigns its aged hero to the great beyond," which he deemed "anticlimactic." Crowther praised Shimura, writing he "measures up through his performance in this picture with the top film actors anywhere," and complimented Miki Odagiri, Nobuo Kaneko and Yunosuke Ito. Variety staff called the film "a tour-de-force...keeping a dramatic thread throughout and avoiding the mawkish."

Roger Ebert added it to his list of Great Movies in 1996, stating "Over the years I have seen Ikiru every five years or so, and each time it has moved me, and made me think. And the older I get, the less Watanabe seems like a pathetic old man, and the more he seems like every one of us." In his Great Movies review of Seven Samurai, Ebert called Ikiru Kurosawa's greatest film. In 2008, Wally Hammond of Time Out praised Ikiru as "one of the triumphs of humanist cinema." That year, The New Yorker's Michael Sragow described it as a "masterwork," noting Kurosawa was usually associated more with his action films. The scene featuring Watanabe on the swing in the playground he built has been described as "iconic."

In 1972, Sight & Sound critics poll named Ikiru the 12th greatest film of all time. In 1999, The Village Voice ranked the film at number 212 in its list of the top 250 Best Films of the Century, based on a poll of critics. Empire magazine ranked Ikiru 459th on its 2008 list of the 500 greatest movies of all time, and 44th on its 2010 list of "The 100 Best Films Of World Cinema." In 2009, the film was voted at No. 13 on the list of "The Greatest Japanese Films of All Time" by Japanese film magazine Kinema Junpo. In 2010 Ikiru was included on Time's All-Time 100 best movies list. In 2012 the film ranked 127th and 132nd on critic's and director's poll respectively in Sight & Sound Top 250 Films list. Martin Scorsese included it on a list of "39 Essential Foreign Films for a Young Filmmaker." The film was included in BBC's 2018 list of The 100 greatest foreign language films. Conversely, in 2016 The Daily Telegraph named it one of the 10 most overrated films.

The film has a 98% positive rating on Rotten Tomatoes, based on 55 reviews, with a weighted average of 8.8/10. The site's consensus reads: "Ikiru is a well-acted and deeply moving humanist tale about a man facing his own mortality, one of legendary director Akira Kurosawa's most intimate films". Metacritic, which uses a weighted average, assigned the film a score of 92 out of 100, based on 20 critics, indicating "universal acclaim".

=== Accolades ===
The film competed for the Golden Bear at the 4th Berlin International Film Festival in 1954.

Award	Date of ceremony	Category	Recipient(s)	Result	Ref(s)
BAFTA Awards	1960	Best Foreign Actor	Takashi Shimura	Nominated	
Berlin International Film Festival	18–29 June 1954	Special Prize of the Senate of Berlin	Akira Kurosawa	Won	
Kinema Junpo Awards	1953	Best Film	Akira Kurosawa	Won	
Mainichi Film Awards	1953	Best Film	Akira Kurosawa	Won	
Mainichi Film Awards	1953	Best Screenplay	Akira Kurosawa, Shinobu Hashimoto and Hideo Oguni	Won	
Mainichi Film Awards	1953	Best Sound Recording	Fumio Yanoguchi	Won	
Ministry of Education	1953	Minister of Education Award		Won	

== Legacy ==
Kurosawa believed William Shakespeare's play Macbeth could serve as a cautionary tale complementing Ikiru, thus directing his 1957 film Throne of Blood. Ikiru was remade as a Japanese television film that debuted on TV Asahi on 9 September 2007, the day after a remake of Kurosawa's High and Low. The Ikiru remake stars kabuki actor Matsumoto Kōshirō IX.

Anand, a 1971 Indian-Hindi film, was inspired by Ikiru. In 2003, DreamWorks attempted a U.S. remake, which would star Tom Hanks in the lead role, and it talked to Richard Price about adapting the screenplay. Jim Sheridan agreed to direct the film in 2004, though it has not been produced.

A musical adaptation was produced in Japan in 2020, with music by Jason Howland and book by Chikae Takahashi.

A British remake titled Living, adapted by Kazuo Ishiguro, directed by Oliver Hermanus, and starring Bill Nighy, was released in 2022.
