= Takashi Shimura =

Japanese actor (1905–1982)

- 志村 喬
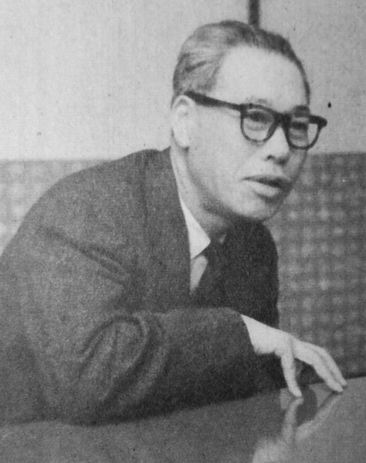
- Shimura in 1956
- Born: Shōji Shimazaki; March 12, 1905; Ikuno, Hyōgo, Empire of Japan
- Died: February 11, 1982 (aged 76); Tokyo, Japan
- Occupation: Actor
- Years active: 1928–1981

Japanese name
- Kanji: 志村 喬
- Hiragana: しむら たかし
- Katakana: シムラ タカシ
Transcriptions
- Romanization: Shimura Takashi

Alternative Japanese name
- Kanji: 島崎 捷爾
- Hiragana: しまざき しょうじ
Transcriptions
- Romanization: Shimazaki Shōji

Takashi Shimura (Japanese: 志村 喬, romanized: Shimura Takashi, born Shōji Shimazaki; March 12, 1905 – February 11, 1982) was a Japanese actor who appeared in over 200 films between 1934 and 1981. He appeared in 21 of Akira Kurosawa's 30 films (more than any other actor), including as a lead actor in Drunken Angel (1948), Rashomon (1950), Ikiru (1952) and Seven Samurai (1954). He played Professor Kyohei Yamane in Ishirō Honda's original Godzilla (1954) and its first sequel, Godzilla Raids Again (1955).

In total, Shimura appeared in more than 300 film roles between 1934 and 1980. He was twice nominated for the BAFTA Award for Best Foreign Actor, and won the Mainichi Film Award for Best Actor in 1950. For his contributions to the arts, the Japanese government decorated Shimura with the Medal with Purple Ribbon in 1974 and the Order of the Rising Sun, 4th Class, Gold Rays with Rosette in 1980.

== Early life ==
Shimura was born Shōji Shimazaki (島崎 捷爾, Shimazaki Shōji) in Ikuno, Hyōgo Prefecture, Japan. His forebears were members of the samurai class: in 1868 his grandfather took part in the Battle of Toba–Fushimi during the Boshin War. Shimura entered Ikuno Primary School in 1911 and Kobe First Middle School in 1917. He missed two years of schooling because of a mild case of tuberculosis, and subsequently moved to the prefectural middle school in Nobeoka, Miyazaki Prefecture, where his father had been transferred by his employer, Mitsubishi Mining. At Nobeoka Middle School, he excelled in English and became active on the literary society's magazine, to which he contributed poetry. He also became a star of the rowing club.

In 1923, he entered Kansai University, but after his father's retirement the family could no longer afford the fees for a full-time course and he switched to the part-time evening course in English literature, supporting himself by working at the Osaka municipal waterworks. Among the teachers in the English Literature Department were the playwright Toyo-oka Sa-ichirō (豊岡佐一郎) and the Shakespeare scholar Tsubouchi Shikō (坪内士行). These two inspired in Shimura an enthusiasm for drama. He joined the University's Theatre Studies Society and in 1928 formed an amateur theatrical group, the Shichigatsu-za (七月座) with Toyo-oka as director. He began to miss work because of the time he spent on theatrical activities and eventually lost his job. He then left university to try to earn a living in the theatre. The Shichigatsu-za turned professional and began to tour, but got into financial difficulties and folded.

== Career ==
After the failure of the Shichigatsu-za, Shimura went back to Osaka, where he began to get roles in radio plays. In 1930 he joined the Kindaiza (近代座) theatre company and became a fully professional actor. He toured China and Japan with the Kindaiza, but in 1932 he left the company and returned again to Osaka, where he appeared with the Shinseigeki (新声劇) and Shinsenza (新選座) troupes. Talking pictures were just then coming in and Shimura realised they would provide opportunities for stage-trained actors. In 1932 he joined the Kyoto studios of the film production company Shinkō Kinema. He made his film debut in the 1934 silent Ren'ai-gai itchōme (恋愛街一丁目: Number One, Love Street). The first film in which he had a speaking part was the 1935 Chūji uridasu (忠次売出す), directed by Mansaku Itami. His first substantial film role was as a detective in Mizoguchi Kenji's 1936 Osaka Elegy (Naniwa erejii; 浪華悲歌).

Shimura as a terminally ill bureaucrat in Kurosawa's Ikiru

The film which established his reputation as a first-rate actor was Itami Mansaku's 1936 Akanishi Kakita (赤西蠣太: Capricious Young Man). In 1937 he moved to Nikkatsu film corporation's Kyoto studios, and between then and 1942 appeared in nearly 100 films. His most notable role in these years was that of Keishirō in the long-running series Umon Torimono-chō (右門捕物帖), starring Kanjūrō Arashi. He also demonstrated his considerable ability as a singer in the 1939 "cine-operetta", Singing Lovebirds. During this time the political regime in Japan was growing ever more oppressive, and Shimura was arrested by the Special Higher Police (Tokubetsu Kōtō Keisatsu, known as Tokkō) and held for about three weeks because of his earlier association with left-wing theatre groups. He was eventually released on the recognisance of his wife Masako and fellow-actor Ryūnosuke Tsukigata. He is said to have made use of this experience later when playing a Tokkō official in Akira Kurosawa's 1946 No Regrets for Our Youth. When Nikkatsu and Daiei merged in 1942, Shimura moved to the Kōa Eiga studios and then in 1943 to Tōhō. A few weeks before the end of the Pacific War in August 1945, Shimura's elder brother was killed in Southeast Asia.

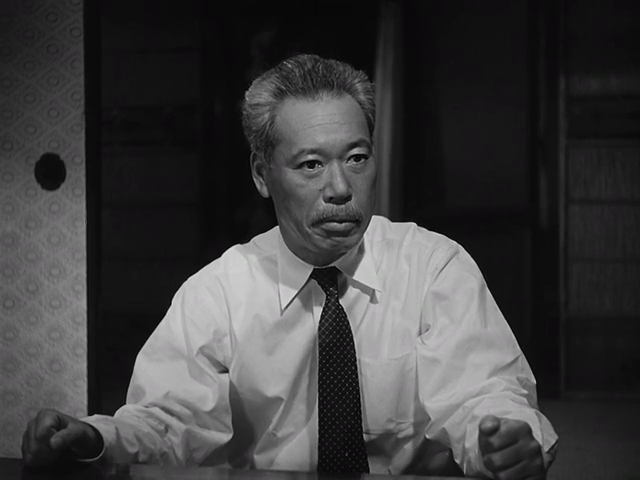
Shimura in Godzilla (1954)

In 1943, Shimura appeared as the old jujutsu teacher Murai Hansuke, a character based on the historical Hansuke Nakamura, in Kurosawa's debut movie, Sanshiro Sugata. Along with Toshirō Mifune, Shimura is the actor most closely associated with Kurosawa: he eventually appeared in 21 of Kurosawa's 30 films. In fact, Kurosawa's cinematic collaboration with Shimura, from Sanshiro Sugata in 1943 to Kagemusha in 1980, started earlier and lasted longer than his work with Mifune (1948–65). Shimura's performances for Kurosawa included the doctor in Drunken Angel (1948), the veteran detective in Stray Dog (1949), the flawed lawyer in Scandal (1950), the woodcutter in Rashomon (1950), the mortally ill bureaucrat in Ikiru (1952), and the lead samurai Kambei in Seven Samurai (1954). Kurosawa wrote the part in Kagemusha specifically for Shimura, but the scenes were cut from the Western release, so many in the West did not know that he had been in the film. The DVD release of the film by The Criterion Collection restored Shimura's footage.

Shimura appeared in a number of Tōhō kaiju (giant monster) and tokusatsu (special effects) films, many of which were directed by Kurosawa's good friend and colleague Ishirō Honda. Shimura's roles included Professor Kyohei Yamane in the original Godzilla (1954), a character he briefly reprised in Godzilla Raids Again (1955).

== Death ==
Shimura died on February 11, 1982, in Tokyo, Japan, from emphysema at the age of 76. His effects were presented to the Film Centre of the National Museum of Modern Art, Tokyo.

== Filmography ==
=== Film ===
- Number One, Love Street (1934) as Osachi's father
- Umon torimonochō: Harebare gojûsantsugi - Ranma hen (1935) as Santa
- Umon torimonochō: Harebare gojûsantsugi (1935)
- Chûji uridasu (1935)
- Umon torimonochō: Harebare gojûsantsugi - Saiketsu hen (1936)
- Osaka Elegy (1936) as Inspector
- Shura hakkō: Dai-san-pen (1936)
- Chûretsu nikudan sanyûshi (1936)
- Akanishi Kakita (1936) as Taranoshin Tsunomata
- Seishun gonin otoko: Zempen (1937)
- Seishun gonin otoko: Kōhen (1937)
- Taki no shiraito (1937)
- Mitokomon kaikokuki (1937)
- Jiraiya (1937) as Gundayū Yao
- Chikemuri Takadanobaba (1937) as Takusan
- The Skull Coin (1938)
- Kurama Tengu (1938) as Kichinosuke Saigō
- Shamisen yakuza (1938) as Heisuke
- Yami no kagebōshi (1938)
- Jigoku no mushi (1938)
- Akagaki Genzō (1938) as Jōzaemon Sakaya
- Yajikita dōchūki (1938)
- Shusse taikoki (1938)
- Mazō (1938)
- Zoku mazō - Ibara Ukon (1939)
- Edo no akutarō (1939)
- Singing Lovebirds (1939) as Kyōsai Shimura
- Tsubanari ronin (1939) as Sherikov
- Shunjū ittōryū (1939) as Jūbei Tamon
- Miyamoto Musashi: Dai-san-bu - Kenshin ichiro (1940)
- Zoku Shimizu minato (1940)
- Phantom Castle (1940)
- Oda Nobunaga (1940)
- Umi wo wataru sairei (1941)
- Sugata naki fukushū (1941)
- Edo saigo no hi (1941)
- Miyamoto Musashi: Ichijoji ketto (1942)
- Hahakogusa (1942)
- Sanshiro Sugata (1943, Kurosawa) as Hansuke Murai
- Himetaru kakugo (1943) as Ryōkichi Ishikawa
- Kaigun (1943)
- Haha no kinembi (1943)
- Kato hayabusa sento-tai (1944)
- The Most Beautiful aka Most Beautifully (1944, Kurosawa) as Chief Goro Ishida
- Shibaidō (1944)
- San-jaku sagohei (1944) as Yasukichi Ito
- Nichijō no tatakai (1944)
- Tokkan ekichō (1945)
- Ai to chikai (1945) as Murai's father, principle
- Kita no san-nin (1945) as Masaki
- Koi no fuunjii (1945) as Lieutenant Okamoto
- The Men Who Tread on the Tiger's Tail (1945, Kurosawa) as Kataoka
- Minshū no Teki (1946)
- Those Who Make Tomorrow (1946) as Theatre manager
- Juichinin no jogakusei (1946)
- No Regrets for Our Youth (1946, Kurosawa) as Police Commissioner 'Poison Strawberry' Dokuichigo
- Aru yo no Tonosama (1946)
- Four Love Stories (1947) as Masao's father (part 1)
- Twenty Four Hours of a Secret Life (1947)
- Snow Trail (1947) as Nojiro
- Haru no mezame (1947) as Kenzō Ogura
- A Second Life (1948) as Union leader
- Drunken Angel (1948, Kurosawa) as Doctor Sanada
- Life of a Woman (1949) as Murata
- The Quiet Duel (1949, Kurosawa) as Dr. Konosuke Fujisaki
- Lady from Hell (1949) as Chief of Police
- Mori no Ishimatsu (1949)
- Stray Dog (1949, Kurosawa) as Detective Sato. Won Best Actor award at 1950 Mainichi Film Concours.
- Onna koroshi abura jigoku (1949)
- Ore wa yojinbo (1950)
- Ma no ogon (1950)
- Shunsetsu (1950)
- Boryōku no Machi (1950)
- Scandal (1950, Kurosawa) as Attorney Hiruta
- Ikari no machi (1950) as Kimiko's father
- Rashomon (1950, Kurosawa) as Kikori, the wood cutter
- Yoru no hibotan (1950)
- Tenya wanya (1950)
- Ginza Sanshiro (1950)
- Datsugoku (1950)
- Ai to nikushimi no kanata e (1951)
- Elegy (1951)
- The Idiot (1951, Kurosawa) as Ono, Ayako's father
- Kedamono no yado (1951)
- Aoi shinju (1951)
- Mesu inu (1951) as Horie
- Hopu-san: sarariiman no maki (1951)
- The Life of a Horsetrader (1951) as Rokutaro Kosaka
- Nusumareta koi (1951)
- Vendetta for a Samurai (1952) as Jinzaemon Kawai
- The Skin of the South (1952)
- Muteki (1952)
- The Life of Oharu (1952) as Old Man
- Sengoku burai (1952)
- Bijo to touzoku (1952) as Yoshimichi
- Ikiru (1952, Kurosawa) as Kanji Watanabe
- Oka wa hanazakari (1952) as Kenkichi Kimura
- Minato e kita otoko (1952) as Okabe
- Fuun senryobune (1952)
- Hoyo (1953) as Watanabe, alias Nabesan
- Tobō chitai (1953)
- Yoru no owari (1953) as Yoshikawa
- Taiheiyō no washi (1953) as Colonel A, staff officer of the army
- Seven Samurai (1954, Kurosawa) as Kambei Shimada
- Jirochō sangokushi: kaitō-ichi no abarenbō (1954)
- Asakusa no yoru (1954) as Komazo
- Kimi shinitamo koto nakare (1954)
- Haha no hatsukoi (1954)
- Shin kurama tengu daiichi wa: Tengu shutsugen (1954)
- Godzilla (1954) as Dr. Kyohei Yamane
- Shin kurama tengu daini wa: Azuma-dera no ketto (1954)
- Bazoku geisha (1954) as Kotaro Yamabe
- Mekura neko (1955)
- Godzilla Raids Again (1955) as Dr. Kyohei Yamane
- Mugibue (1955) as Nobuo's father
- No Time for Tears (1955) as Tatsurō Shimamura
- Sanjusan go sha otonashi (1955)
- Shin kurama tengu daisanbu (1955)
- Muttsuri Umon torimonocho (1955)
- Geisha Konatsu: Hitori neru yo no Konatsu (1955) as Sakuma
- Sugata naki mokugekisha (1955) as Inspector Kasai
- Asagiri (1955)
- I Live in Fear aka Record of a Living Being (1955, Kurosawa) as Dr. Harada
- Samurai III: Duel at Ganryu Island (1956) as Sado Nagaoka the court official
- Shin, Heike monogatari: Yoshinaka o meguru sannin no onna (1956) as Sanemori Saito
- Wakai ki (1956) as Hanako's Father
- Kyatsu o nigasuna (1956) as Nagasawa
- The Underworld (1956) as Tsunejiro Furuya
- Godzilla, King of the Monsters (1956) as Dr. Yamane
- Narazu-mono (1956) as Juzo
- Tōkyō hanzai chizu (1956)
- Bōkyaku no hanabira (1957)
- Throne of Blood (1957, Kurosawa) as Noriyasu Odagura
- Yama to kawa no aru machi (1957)
- Kono futari ni sachi are (1957)
- Sanjūrokunin no jōkyaku (1957) as Yamagami - Detective
- Arakure (1957)
- Bōkyaku no hanabira: Kanketsuhen (1957)
- Kiken na eiyu (1957)
- Yuunagi (1957) as Yasunori Igawa
- Aoi sanmyaku Shinko no maki (1957)
- Zoku Aoi sanmyaku Shinko no maki (1957)
- Dotanba (1957)
- The Mysterians (1957) as Dr. Tanjiro Adachi
- Ohtori-jo no hanayome (1958)
- Edokko matsuri (1958) as Hōkinokami Aoyama
- The Loyal 47 Ronin (Chūshingura) (1958) as Jūbei Ōtake
- Seven from Edo (1958) as Sagamiya
- Haha (1958) as Ijūin
- Uguisu-jō no hanayome (1958)
- Ten to sen (1958) as Kasai
- Jinsei gekijō - Seishun hen (1958)
- The Hidden Fortress (1958, Kurosawa) as The Old General, Izumi Nagakura
- Nichiren to Mōko Daishūrai (1958) as Yasaburō
- Ken wa shitte ita (1958)
- Sora kakeru hanayome (1959) as Shichibei
- Tetsuwan tōshu Inao monogatari (1959) as Kyūsaku Inao
- Kotan no kuchibue (1959)
- Taiyō ni somuku mono (1959) as Ichikawa - detective
- Sengoku gunto-den (1959) as Saemon Toki
- Kagero ezu (1959) as Ryoan
- The Three Treasures (1959) as Elder Kumaso
- Beran me-e geisha (1959)
- Shobushi to sono musume (1959)
- Kēdamonō no torū michi (1959)
- Afraid to Die (1960) as Gohei Hirayama
- Storm Over the Pacific (1960) as Tosaku
- Yoru no nagare (1960) as Koichiro Sonoda
- Man Against Man (1960) as Chotaro Masue
- The Bad Sleep Well (1960, Kurosawa) as Administrative Officer Moriyama
- Gambare! Bangaku (1960)
- Sarariiman Chūshingura (1960) as Honzo Kadokawa
- Sen-hime goten (1960) as Sadonokami Honda
- The Story of Osaka Castle (1961) as Katagiri
- Harekosode (1961)
- Zoku sarariiman Chūshingura (1961) as Honzo Kadokawa
- Yojimbo (1961, Kurosawa) as Tokuemon - Sake Brewer
- Fundoshi isha (1961) as Matsuoemon
- Kutsukake Tokijirō (1961) as Hacchōnawate Tokubei
- Ai to honoho to (1961) as Yoshii
- Mothra (1961) as News Editor
- Kuroi gashū dainibu: Kanryū (1961)
- Futari no musuko (1961)
- Restoration Fire (1961) as Yahei
- Sanjuro (1962, Kurosawa) as Kurofuji
- Zoku sarariiman shimizu minato (1962)
- Long Way to Okinawa (1962)
- Gorath (1962) as Kensuke Sonoda - Paleontologist
- Kurenai no sora (1962)
- Kujira gami (1962)
- Chushingura: Hana no Maki, Yuki no Maki (1962) as Hyōbu Chisaka
- Attack Squadron! (1963) as Admiral
- High and Low (1963, Kurosawa) as Chief of Investigation Section
- Boryokudan (1963)
- Attack Squadron! (1963)
- The Lost World of Sinbad (1963) as King Raksha
- Tsukiyo no wataridori (1963) as Nagisa yo yuki jo
- Jinsei gekijo: shin hisha kaku (1964)
- Chi to daiyamondo (1964)
- Brand of Evil (1964) as Tsukamoto, manager
- Tensai sagishi monogatari: Tanuki no hanamichi (1964) as Komai
- Ghidorah, the Three-Headed Monster (1964) as Dr. Tsukamoto
- Kwaidan (1964) as Head priest (segment "Miminashi Hōichi no hanashi")
- Matatabi san ning yakuza (1965) as Kakegawa Bunzo
- Jigoku no hatobā (1965)
- Barā kētsu shobū (1965)
- Samurai Assassin (1965) as Narihisa Ichijō
- Red Beard (1965, Kurosawa) as Tokubei Izumiya
- Sanshiro Sugata (1965) as Mishima
- Taiheiyō kiseki no sakusen: Kisuka (1965) as Military Command president
- Frankenstein vs. Baragon (1965) as Axis Scientist
- Buraikan jingi (1965) as Genkichi Jinnai
- Kono koe naki sakebi (1965)
- Sarutobi Sasuke (1966) as Hakuunsai Tozawa
- Bangkok no yoru (1966) as Dr. Yoshino
- Kaerazeru hatoba (1966) as Detective Egusa
- Zesshō (1966) as Sōbei Sonoda
- Showa saidai no kaoyaku (1966)
- Noren ichidai: jōkyō (1966)
- Ārappoi no ha gōmen dazē (1967)
- Satogashi ga kowareru toki (1967) as Kudo
- Japan's Longest Day (1967) as Information Bureau Director Hiroshi Shimomura
- Gyangu no teiō (1967)
- Naniwa kyokaku: dokyo shichinin giri (1967)
- Kyokotsu ichidai (1967)
- The Sands of Kurobe (1968) as Ashimura
- The Bride From Hades (1968) as Hakuôdô
- Zatoichi and the Fugitives (1968) as Dr. Junan
- Gion matsuri (1968) as Tsuneemon
- Shin Abashiri Bangaichi (1968) as Tetsutarō Fujigami
- Sangyo supai (1968)
- Onna tobakushi amadera kaichō (1968)
- Gendai yakuza: yotamono no okite (1968)
- Ah kaiten tokubetsu kogetikai (1968)
- Samurai Banners (1969)
- Shōwa zankyō-den: Karajishi jingi (1969)
- It's Tough Being a Man (1969) as Hyōichirō Suwa
- Shin Abashiri Bangaichi: Saihate no Nagare-mono (1969)
- Shin Abashiri Bangaichi: Runin-masaki no ketto (1969)
- Nihon boryoku-dan: kumicho to shikaku (1969)
- The Militarists (1970) as Editor (uncredited)
- Yomigaeru daichi (1971) as Gondo
- Gorotsuki mushuku (1971)
- Tora-san's Love Call (1971) as Hyouichiro Suwa (Hiroshi's father)
- Otoko wa tsurai yo: Torajiro renka (1971)
- Gokuaku bozu - Nomu utsu kau (1971)
- Gokudo makari touru (1972)
- Zatoichi's Conspiracy (1973) as Sakubei
- Karei-naru Ichizoku (1974) as Yasuda - Makiko's father
- Ranru no hata (1974) as Shihei Furukawa
- Prophecies of Nostradamus (1974) as Pediatrician
- Karajishi keisatsu (1974)
- The Bullet Train (1975) as JNR President
- Zoku ningen kakumei (1976)
- Ogin-sama (1978, Love and Faith) as Sen Rikyu
- Otoko wa tsurai yo: Uwasa no Torajirō (1978) as Hiroshi's Father
- Dōran (1980) as Kosuke Miyagi
- Tempyō no Iraka (1980)
- Kagemusha (1980, Kurosawa) as Gyobu Taguchi
- Story of the Japan Philharmonic: Movement of Flame (1981) (final film role)

=== Television ===
- Akō Rōshi (1964)
- Ten to Chi to (1969), Nagao Fusakage
- Haru no Sakamichi (1971), Aoyama Tadatoshi
- Daichūshingura (1971), Horiuchi Denzaemon
- Akai Unmei (1976)
- Ōgon no Hibi (1978), Notoya
- Fumō Chitai (1979), Tanigawa

== Honours ==
- Medal with Purple Ribbon (1974)
- Order of the Rising Sun, 4th Class, Gold Rays with Rosette (1980)
