= The Garden of Women =

1954 film by Keisuke Kinoshita

- Theatrical release poster

Japanese name
- Kanji: 女の園
- Directed by: Keisuke Kinoshita
- Written by: Keisuke Kinoshita; Tomoji Abe (novel)
- Produced by: Takeshi Yamamoto
- Starring: Mieko Takamine; Hideko Takamine; Keiko Kishi; Yoshiko Kuga
- Cinematography: Hiroshi Kusuda
- Edited by: Yoshi Sugihara
- Music by: Chūji Kinoshita
- Production company: Shochiku
- Distributed by: Shochiku
- Release date: 16 March 1954 (Japan)
- Running time: 141 mins.
- Country: Japan
- Language: Japanese

The Garden of Women (女の園, Onna no sono) is a 1954 Japanese drama film written and directed by Keisuke Kinoshita. It is based on the novel Jinkō Teien (人工庭園; lit. Artificial Garden) by Tomoji Abe.

== Plot ==
After the opening sequence, documenting the uprise of students at a women's boarding school following the death of one of their fellow students, the preceding events are told in a flashback narration: Among a number of young female students, opposition is growing against the conservative-authoritarian school administration and its strict doctrines. The opposing students are divided into fractions themselves, left-wing like Akiko versus unpolitical like Tomiko, and ones who call for action now versus those who urge not to act prematurely. The latter is a repeated cause for debate between Akiko, an overt socialist of upper-class descent, and Toshiko, who acts as sort of a leading figure and ideologue. Catalyst of the events is student Yoshie, who is behind in her studies, but not allowed to work late at night according to the rules. Yoshie enrolled in the school in an attempt to escape her rigid father, who also rejects her wish to marry her friend Shimoda once both have their degrees. Picked on by teacher Mayumi and suffering from social distancing by the other girls, Yoshie finally commits suicide. While she is mourned by Tomiko and Shimoda, with Tomiko, Akiko and Mayumi blaming each other for her death, the other students block the auditorium under Toshiko's guidance and sing their unofficial student's hymn which the administration had banned.

== Cast ==
- Mieko Takamine — Mayumi Gojō, teacher
- Hideko Takamine — Yoshie Izushi
- Keiko Kishi — Tomiko Takioka
- Yoshiko Kuga — Akiko Hayashino
- Kazuko Yamamoto — Toshiko
- Takahiro Tamura — Sankichi Shimoda
- Masami Taura — Yoshikazu Sagara
- Chieko Higashiyama — President
- Kikue Mori — Dean
- Kuniko Igawa — Yoshie's sister
- Nobuo Kaneko — Kihei Hirato
- Yūko Mochizuki — Landlady
- Chieko Naniwa — Tomiko's aunt

== Reception ==
Film historians Keiko McDonald and Donald Richie have noted the film's contrast between the traditional, feudalistic Japan represented by the educational establishment, and the emerging, more democratic post-war values seen in the pupils. Richie also commented favourably on Kinoshita's treatment of adolescent girls' emotional problems in this context, drawing comparisons to Mädchen in Uniform. Nagisa Ōshima named The Garden of Women as the film which led to his decision to become a filmmaker himself in his 1995 documentary 100 Years of Japanese Cinema.

== Awards ==
The Garden of Women received the 1954 Mainichi Film Awards for Best Director, Best Screenplay, Best Supporting Actress (Yoshiko Kuga), Best Music and Best Sound Recording, as well as the Blue Ribbon Award for Best Screenplay.
