= Mahiru no ankoku =

Mahiru no Ankoku
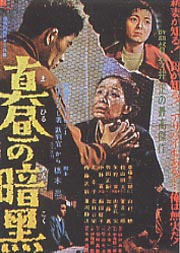
- Theatrical release poster

Japanese name
- Kanji: 真昼の暗黒
- Directed by: Tadashi Imai
- Written by: Shinobu Hashimoto; Hiroshi Masaki (book)
- Produced by: Tengo Yamada
- Starring: Kōjirō Kusanagi; Sachiko Hidari; Taketoshi Naitō; Chōko Iida; Sō Yamamura
- Cinematography: Shun'ichirō Nakao
- Music by: Akira Ifukube
- Production company: Gendai Production
- Release date: 27 March 1956 (Japan)
- Running time: 122 minutes
- Country: Japan
- Language: Japanese

Mahiru no Ankoku (Japanese: 真昼の暗黒; lit. 'Darkness at Noon') is a 1956 Japanese drama film directed by Tadashi Imai. It is based on an actual court case, described in the non-fiction book "Saibankan–Hito no inochi wa kenryoku de ubaeru mono ka" by attorney Hiroshi Masaki.

== Cast ==
- Kōjirō Kusanagi
- Sachiko Hidari
- Taketoshi Naitō
- Chōko Iida
- Sō Yamamura

== Awards ==
Mahiru no ankoku received the Blue Ribbon Award, the Mainichi Film Award and the Kinema Junpo Award for Best Film. It also received the Blue Ribbon Award and Mainichi Film Award for Best Director, Best Screenplay and Best Film Music.
