= Blue Ribbon Awards =

Japanese film awards

- Awarded for: Excellence in filmmaking
- Country: Japan
- First award: 1950; 76 years ago
- Website: cinemahochi.yomiuri.co.jp

The Blue Ribbon Awards (ブルーリボン賞, Burū Ribon Shō) are film-specific prizes awarded solely by movie critics and writers in Tokyo, Japan, established in 1950 by The Association of Tokyo Film Journalists (東京映画記者会, Tōkyō Eiga Kishakai), established under the name of the "Association of Tokyo Film Journalists Award", which was formed mainly by film reporters from the Yomiuri Shimbun, Asahi Shimbun, and Mainichi Shimbun. Currently, the Association is made up of film reporters from seven sports newspapers in Tokyo: Sports Hochi (previously Hochi Shimbun), Sankei Sports, Sponichi, Daily Sports, Tokyo Sports, Tokyo Chunichi Sports, and Nikkan Sports.

== History ==
Film reporters from the Yomiuri Shimbun, Asahi Shimbun, and Mainichi Shimbun took the lead in calling other reporters to "look back on the film industry over the past year, discuss the results, and summarize them". The first award ceremony was held on March 22, 1951 at the Tokyo Theater in Chūō, Tokyo. Finances were scarce, and the only thing given to the winners was a handwritten certificate tied with a matching blue ribbon, hence the name "Blue Ribbon Award". The current award consists of a certificate in Japanese paper with the reason for the award and a Montblanc fountain pen engraved with the name of the winner, tied with a blue ribbon. There are few documents left about the "Blue Ribbon Award" at the time, but there is a theory that the first award was called the "Japan Film Culture Award", but when it was announced in the newspaper in 1951, it was written as "The Association of Tokyo Film Journalists Award".

From the 4th (1953) to the 7th editions (1956), the award ceremony took place in Namikiza, in Ginza, with the cooperation of Toho producer Sanezumi Fujimoto, its owner. The award included a statuette designed by manga artist Taizo Yokoyama. The Newcomer Award was first given in the 2nd edition.

The Association had grown to 80 members, from 17 newspapers and agencies. Differences arose among the members in deciding the method to choose the winners. In March 1960, the six major Japanese newspapers (Yomiuri Shimbun, Asahi Shimbun, Mainichi Shimbun, Sankei Shimbun, Tokyo Shimbun, and Nihon Keizai Shinbun) as well as the Japanese Associated Press withdrew their support for the Blue Ribbon Awards. The newly established Association of Japanese Film Journalists held its own award ceremony, Association of Japanese Film Journalists Awards (日本映画記者会賞, Nihon Eiga Kishakai Shō), but there was also awards by other groups, like the theater press (The Theatron Awards) and the local newspapers (The White Bronce Awards).

In 1966, the "Black Mist Incident", a political scandal centered on the Liberal Democratic Party, that eventually enveloped Japan's baseball industry, led to the temporary suspension of the Blue Ribbon Award (as well as other awards). With many voices asking for the return of the ceremony, in particular those of the younger generation of reporters, in 1975, the awards were revived. With the number of Japanese films below those of Western films (7,457 screens in the 60s, 2,443 screens by 1975), the entire film industry was in a period of decline. The news of the return of the awards was a motivation to reform the cinematic industry. Namikiza had become too small a venue, so the tavern next door had to be rented for the waiting room.

Although the award is not acclaimed highly on an international level, the Blue Ribbon Awards have become one of the most prestigious national cinema awards in Japan, along with the Kinema Junpo Awards (キネマ旬報賞, Kinema Junpō Shō) and the Mainichi Film Concours (毎日映画コンクール, Mainichi Eiga Konkūru). Winning one of these awards is considered to be a great honour. In addition, the winning films themselves have a tendency to receive high distinctions in other film festivals around the world. Some of the films nominated include The Hidden Fortress (1958), The Insect Woman (1963), Vengeance Is Mine (1979), A Scene at the Sea (1991), Battle Royale (2000), Spirited Away (2001), The Twilight Samurai (2002), Nobody Knows (2004), Shin Godzilla (2016), Fukushima 50 (2020), and Godzilla Minus One (2023).

The public event ceremony is hosted by the Best Actor and Best Actress award winners of the previous year, and has been held every year since 1975 until 2020, when it was suspended because of the COVID-19 pandemic. It resumed in 2024 for the 66th edition, the hosts being Chieko Baisho and Arashi's Kazunari Ninomiya. On January 23, 2024, the Association of Tokyo Film Journalists opened an official X (formerly Twitter) account for the Blue Ribbon Awards.

== Categories ==
There are following categories:

- Best Film
- Best Actor
- Best Actress
- Best Supporting Actor
- Best Supporting Actress
- Best Director
- Best Foreign Film
- Best Newcomer
- Best Screenplay
- Best Cinematography
- Special Award
