= Hideo Oguni =

Japanese screenwriter (1904–1996)

- 小国英雄
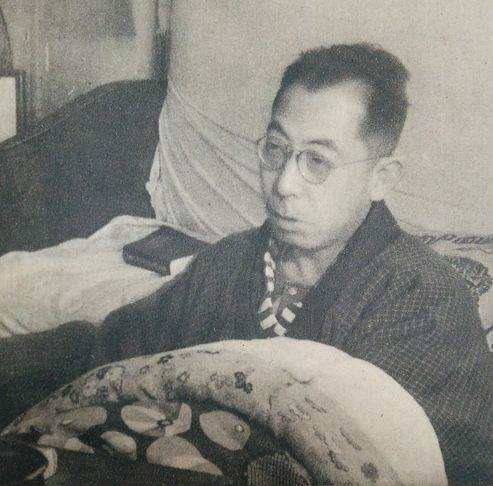
- Hideo Oguni in 1948
- Born: 9 July 1904; Hachinohe, Aomori Prefecture
- Died: 5 February 1996 (aged 91)
- Occupation: Screenwriter
- Known for: Ikiru, Seven Samurai, Throne of Blood, The Hidden Fortress

Hideo Oguni (小国 英雄, Oguni Hideo; 9 July 1904 – 5 February 1996) was a Japanese writer who wrote over 100 screenplays. He is best known for co-writing screenplays for a number of films directed by Akira Kurosawa, including Ikiru (1952), Seven Samurai (1954), Throne of Blood (1957), and The Hidden Fortress (1958).

== Career ==
Oguni's first film with Kurosawa was Ikiru (1952). The film has a two-part structure which was devised by Oguni. Film critic Donald Richie regarded him as the "humanist" among Kurosawa's writers.

Writing credits other than for Kurosawa films include Heinosuke Gosho's Where Chimneys Are Seen (1953), Koji Shima's Warning from Space (1956), Bin Kato's Heiji Zenigata: Chase the Demon Lantern (1958), Tora! Tora! Tora! (1970), and Hiroshi Inagaki's Machibuse (1970).

In 2013, Oguni and his frequent collaborators—Kurosawa, Shinobu Hashimoto and Ryūzō Kikushima—were awarded the Jean Renoir Award by the Writers Guild of America West.
