= Ryūzō Kikushima =

Japanese writer and film producer (1914–1989)

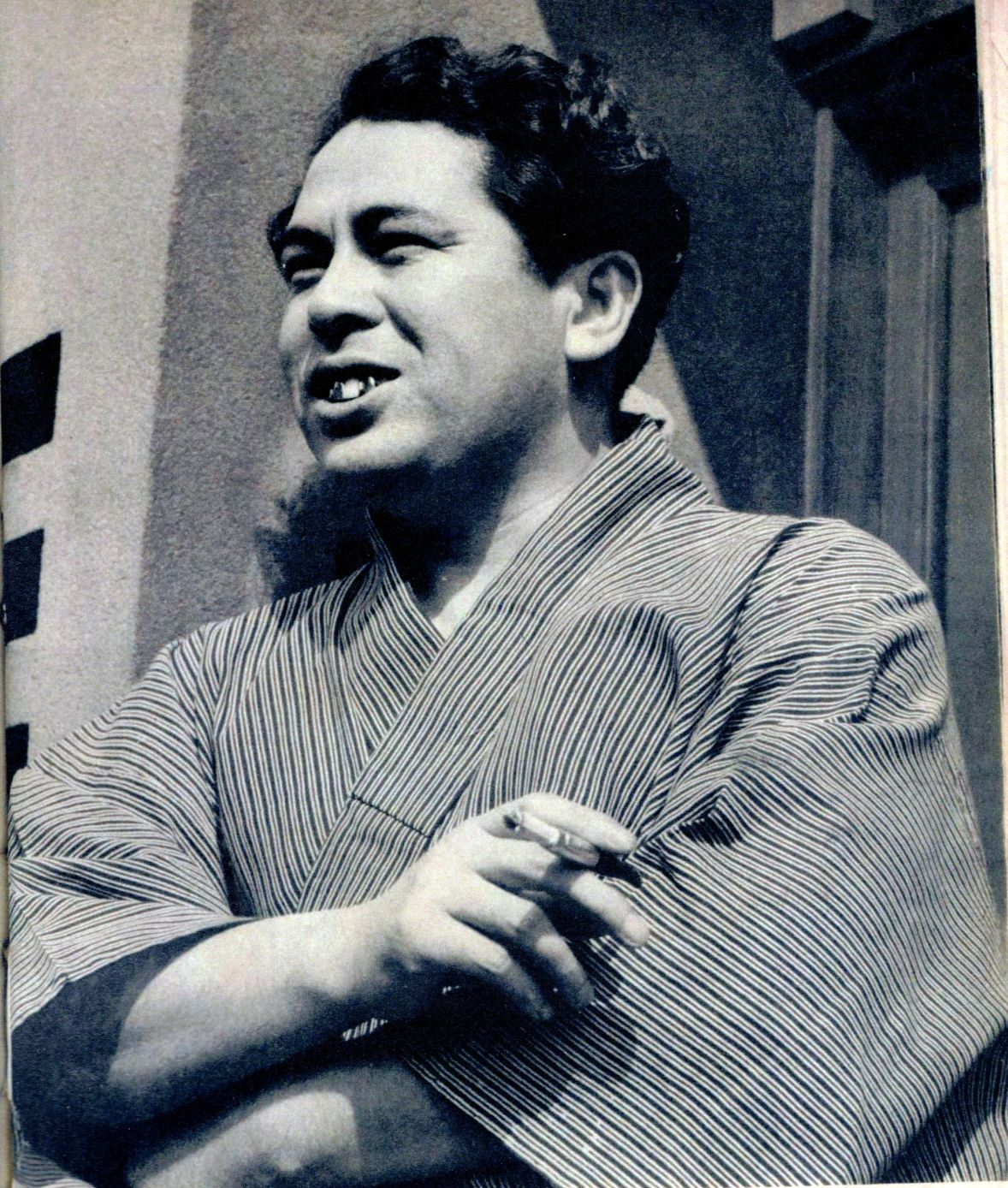
Ryūzō Kikushima

Ryūzō Kikushima (菊島 隆三, Kikushima Ryūzō; 1 March 1914 – 18 March 1989) was a Japanese screenwriter and film producer who is best known for co-writing the screenplays for several films directed by Akira Kurosawa, including Throne of Blood (1957), The Hidden Fortress (1958), Yojimbo (1961), and High and Low (1963). He also produced several of Kurosawa's films in the early 1960s. In addition to his work with Kurosawa, he wrote or co-wrote the screenplays for Arashi (1956); The Three Treasures (1959); When a Woman Ascends the Stairs (1960), for which he also was a producer; and Tora! Tora! Tora! (1970).

In 2013, Kikushima and frequent screenwriting collaborators Kurosawa, Shinobu Hashimoto and Hideo Oguni were awarded the Jean Renoir Award by the Writers Guild of America West.
