= Hakkenden =

Hakkenden, and variations, may refer to:

- Nansō Satomi Hakkenden, an epic 19th century serial novel by Kyokutei Bakin

Or adaptations of the story, including:

- Satomi Hakkenden (1983), known as Legend of the Eight Samurai, a martial arts fantasy film
- The Hakkenden (1990–1995), an anime OVA series by Anime International Company
- Idol Hakkenden (1989), a Japanese text adventure video game
- Shin Hakkenden (1999), a Japanese anime series
- Hakkenden: Eight Dogs of the East (Hakkenden: Tōhō Hakken Ibun), a 2005 manga and 2013 Japanese anime series adaptation
