= Murasame-class destroyer =

Murasame-class destroyer may refer to:

- Murasame-class destroyer (1958) (1958–1988), a class of destroyers in the Japan Maritime Self-Defense Force
- Murasame-class destroyer (1994), a third-generation warship class in service with the Japan Maritime Self-Defense Force

== See also ==
- Murasame (disambiguation)
- Japanese destroyer Murasame
