= Atsushi Watanabe (actor, born 1898) =

Japanese actor (1898–1977)

- 渡辺 篤
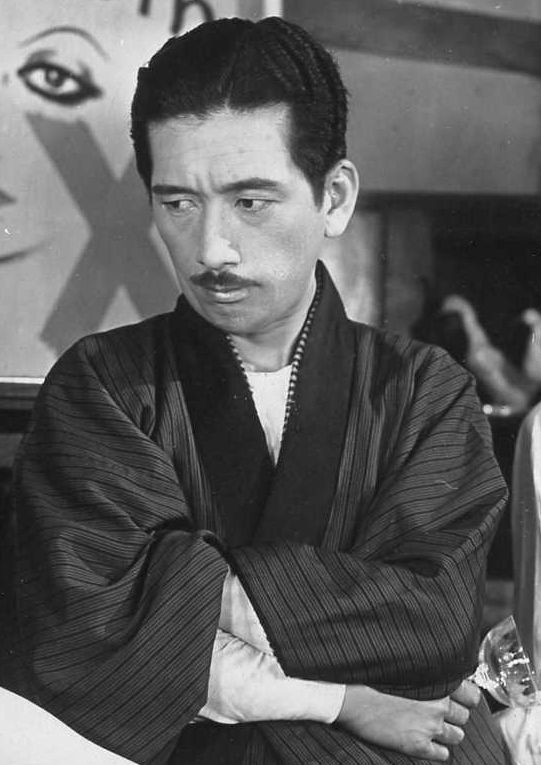
- Born: 9 April 1898; Tokyo, Japan
- Died: 27 February 1977 (aged 78); Tokyo, Japan
- Occupation: Actor
- Years active: 1921–1970

Atsushi Watanabe (渡辺 篤, Watanabe Atsushi; 9 April 1898 – 27 February 1977) was a Japanese film actor. He appeared in more than 80 films from 1921 to 1970.

== Career ==
Starting out in Asakusa Opera, Watanabe shifted to film in 1921, joining Makino Educational Pictures, a precursor to Makino Film Productions. Moving to other studios, he eventually settled at Shochiku's Kamata studio in 1925 and eventually became established as a comic star, often appearing in Torajiro Saito's films. He eventually joined the revue company of Roppa Furukawa and made films at Toho. In the postwar era, he appeared in a number of films by Akira Kurosawa.

== Selected filmography ==
- 1921: Kyôdainaka wa
- 1922: Aa, Konishi junsa
- 1922: Aru shinbun kisha no shuki
- 1924: Shiragiku no uta
- 1924: Nemurerû daichî
- 1924: Mikazuki Oroku: zenpen
- 1925: Kagaribi no yoru
- 1925: Momoiro no toge
- 1925: Mahjong
- 1925: Umi no himitsu
- 1925: Koizuma - Rakugoka Koiasa
- 1925: Yôsei chi ni otsureba
- 1925: Aisai no himitsu
- 1925: Mikazuki oroku
- 1925: Mâjan
- 1925: Korerâ seibatsû
- 1925: Goiken gomuyô
- 1926: Nayamashiki koro
- 1926: Don Kyûnoshin
- 1926: Karabotan
- 1926: Ama - Nangoku-hen
- 1926: Cosmos saku koro
- 1926: Junanbana - Hayashi Kenichi [bank president]
- 1926: Yume no koban musume shiranami
- 1926: Venisû no funauta
- 1926: Shinkon jidai
- 1927: Kyûkanchô - Torakichi Ôyama - Chimney sweeper
- 1927: Shôwa jidai - Yasuda's assistant
- 1927: Kafe no joô
- 1927: Mura no isha gendai no on'nanoko e
- 1927: Shinsô no bijô
- 1927: Shinkônshâ kyoiku
- 1927: Mura no isha to modan garû
- 1928: Moshimo kanojo ga
- 1928: Katsudôkyô
- 1928: Renai futari angya
- 1928: Odore wakamono
- 1928: Hito no yo no sugata
- 1928: Hirotta hanayome
- 1928: Riku no ôja
- 1928: Teishû soju
- 1928: Nonkimono
- 1928: Gokurôsama
- 1928: Doraku goshinan
- 1928: Appare bîdanshî
- 1929: Ahiru onna
- 1929: Iroke tappuri
- 1929: Kibô
- 1929: Yôkina uta
- 1929: Oyaji to sono ko
- 1929: Shunyo kôitatehikî
- 1929: Renai dai-ikka
- 1929: Aishite chodaî
- 1930: Shingun - Soldier
- 1930: Reijin - A gentleman
- 1930: Kânôjo wa dôkoê iku
- 1930: Hohoemu jinsei
- 1930: Modern okusama
- 1930: Umi no kôshinkyoku
- 1930: Seishun no chi wa odoru
- 1930: Ubawareta kuchibiru
- 1930: Tatakarê teishû
- 1930: Sêntantekî dawanê
- 1930: Îroke dangô sodoki
- 1930: Chotto demashita sânkakuyarô
- 1931: Ai yo jinrui to tomo ni are - Zenpen: Nihon hen - Yoshida, secretary
- 1931: Machî no runpên
- 1931: Kagoya dainagôn
- 1931: The Neighbor's Wife and Mine - Shibano Shinnsaku
- 1931: Runpen niwaka daijin
- 1931: Kono ana wo miyo
- 1932: Kuma no deru kaikonchi - Sahei
- 1932: Amerika koro
- 1932: Midori no kishu - Horse groom Genzo
- 1932: Mâchi seîshun sôtohen
- 1932: Shin senjô
- 1932: Konjiki yasha - Tadatsugu Toyama
- 1932: Modan hakusho
- 1934: Karisome no kuchibeni - Ogata
- 1937: Gyudarê chôtokyu
- 1939: Roppa no Ôkubo Hikozaemon
- 1939: Musume no negai wa tada hitotsu
- 1939: Roppa no komoriuta
- 1939: Tokyo blues
- 1939: Roppa uta no miyako e yuku
- 1940: Oyako kujira
- 1941: Kinô kieta otoko - Kanko
- 1941: Kodakara fûfu - Watanabe, Goto's secretary
- 1941: Hasegawa Roppa no Iemitsu to Hikoza
- 1941: Otoko no hanamichi - Kasuke
- 1943: Ongaku dai-shingun
- 1944: Tanoshiki kana jinsei - Clockmaker Shûkichi
- 1944: Shibaidô
- 1945: Tokkan ekichô
- 1947: Todoroki sensei
- 1947: One Wonderful Sunday - Yamamoto
- 1947: Shin baka jidadi: Zenpen
- 1947: Shin baka jidai: kôhen
- 1948: Konjiki yasha: Kôhen
- 1949: Nodojiman-kyô jidai
- 1949: Hana kurabe tanuki-goten
- 1949: Otoko no namida
- 1949: Umon torimonochô: Nazo no hachijûhachi-ya - Matsu
- 1949: Odoroki ikka
- 1950: Conduct Report on Professor Ishinaka
- 1950: Shimikin no muteki keirin-ô
- 1950: Enoken no happyakuya-danuki ôabare
- 1951: Umon torimonochô: Katame ookami - 'Chongire' no Matsu
- 1951: Joshu Garasu
- 1952: Yagura daiko - Zenba
- 1952: Musume jûku wa mada junjô yo - Yoshibei Echigoya
- 1952: Ikiru - Patient
- 1952: Ashita wa gekkyûbi - Furugaki
- 1952: Hanayome wa na muko chanbara bushi
- 1953: Botchan - Teacher
- 1954: Jyazû sutaa tanjô
- 1954: Seven Samurai - Bun Seller
- 1954: Natsu matsuri rakugochoyo
- 1954: Sorcerer's Orb
- 1954: Heiji torimono hikae: yurei daimyo
- 1955: Kago de iku no wa
- 1954: Appare koshinuke chindochu
- 1955: I Live in Fear - Factory Worker Ishida
- 1956: Taifû sôdôki
- 1957: Hesokuri oyaji
- 1957: Akuma no kao - New croquette shop owner
- 1957: Donzoko: Ralé - Kuna
- 1957: Hana kurenai ni - Sen'yama
- 1957: Musume sanbagarasu
- 1958: Nitôhei monogatari: Shindara kami-sama no maki
- 1958: Nitôhei monogatari: Aa senyû no maki
- 1959: Senryô-jishi - Kansuke
- 1960: Tenpô rokkasen - Jigoku no hanamichi
- 1960: Kyôsaitô sôsai ni eikô are - Tanimura
- 1960: Tôkkaidô kaginuke chindochu
- 1961: Shin nitôhei monogatari medetaku gaisen no maki
- 1961: Hatamoto kenka taka - Yobei Tajimaya
- 1961: Yojimbo - The Cooper - Coffin-Maker
- 1961: Kaidan Oiwa no borei
- 1962: Nippon no obaachan - Suzumura
- 1962: Hatamoto taikutsu otoko: nazo no sango yashiki
- 1963: Bakurô ichidai - Ogasawara
- 1963: Okashina yatsu - Takuetsu
- 1965: The Scarlet Camellia - Yosuke
- 1965: Red Beard - Patient B
- 1966: Ohana han - Kitakawara, Ôzu town mayor
- 1968: Sukurappu shûdan
- 1970: Dodes'ka-den - Mr. Tanba (final film role)
