= Japanese ship Murasame =

Four Japanese navy ships have borne the name Murasame (村雨 / むらさめ; "passing shower").

- Japanese destroyer Murasame (1902) was a Harusame-class destroyer of the Imperial Japanese Navy, launched in 1902 and decommissioned in 1923.
- Japanese destroyer Murasame (1935) was a Shiratsuyu-class destroyer of the Imperial Japanese Navy, launched in 1935 and sunk 1943 in the Battle of Blackett Strait.
- JDS Murasame (DD-107) was the lead ship of the Murasame-class destroyer (1958) in the Japan Maritime Self-Defense Force, launched in 1958 and deleted in 1988.
- JDS Murasame (DD-101) is the lead ship of the Murasame-class destroyer (1994) in the Japan Maritime Self-Defense Force, launched in 1994.

== See also ==
- Murasame
- Murasame-class destroyer
