= Nansō Satomi Hakkenden =

Japanese epic novel (yomihon) by Kyokutei Bakin

- Nansō Satomi Hakkenden Volume 5
- Author: Kyokutei Bakin
- Original title: 南総里見八犬傳
- Language: Japanese
- Genre: Historical fiction, historical fantasy, gesaku
- Set in: 15th century Kantō region, Japan
- Publisher: Sanseido (vol 1-5), Yusendo (vol 6-7), Bunkeido (vol 8-9)
- Publication date: 1814-42
- Publication place: Japan

Nansō Satomi Hakkenden (shinjitai: 南総里見八犬伝; kyūjitai: 南總里見八犬傳), commonly known as Satomi Hakkenden (Japanese: 里見八犬伝) or simply Hakkenden (Japanese: 八犬伝), is a Japanese epic novel (yomihon) by Kyokutei Bakin, originally published over the course of twenty-eight years (1814–42). Set in the Muromachi period (c. 1336-1573), the story follows the adventures and mishaps of eight fictional warriors born across the Kantō region, who gradually discover their shared origin as "spirit-children" of a Satomi princess and unite in Nansō as loyal defenders of her clan.

The novel, consisting of 98 chapters printed in a total of 106 booklets, is considered the largest novel in the history of Japanese Literature. Bakin, in his 70s by the time the work was completed, had gone blind before finishing the tale, and dictated the final parts to his daughter-in-law Michi Tokimura. Along with Ueda Akinari's Ugetsu Monogatari, it is considered a masterpiece of gesaku literature, and one of the classics of Japanese historical fiction.

The title Hakkenden has been translated as The Eight Dog Chronicles, Tale of Eight Dogs, or Biographies of Eight Dogs.

== Synopsis ==
Hakkenden is a long, dense work told from multiple perspectives - described by translator Glynne Walley as "huge and unwieldy, almost comically so". However, it can be divided into three main arcs - a prologue leading up to the Dog Warriors' birth, the stories of the individual Dogs as they encounter one another, and a final war between the Satomi and their assembled foes. The latter segment is often excluded from modern abridged editions of the novel.

=== An Ill-Considered Jest [Chapters 1-14] ===
A battle at Shimōsa Province claims the lives of most of the Satomi clan. The young heir Yoshizane escapes to the neighbouring province of Awa, where two districts have recently been conquered by the tyrannical Sadakane. Lords Maro and Anzai of the other districts have met to plan action against Sadakane, but spurn Yoshizane's aid. He then encounters the loyalist samurai Takayoshi, and together they launch a rebellion which ousts Sadakane and places Yoshizane in control of his territories.

As the criminals are rounded up for execution, Sadakane's wife Tamazusa lays a curse on her captors: for Takayoshi who wished for her death, he shall die by the blade and have his family line come to an end. And for the ever-noble Satomi, his descendants shall become as depraved as dogs. Shortly after, Yoshizane rewards Takayoshi with stewardship of a castle, but seized by the curse he commits seppuku rather than profit from his liege's death. In his last moments he discovers that he has a son named Daisuke, who shall inherit his lands in his stead.

Yoshizane marries and has two children - a daughter named Fuse and a son named Jirotaro. However, Fuse is born weak and cries often. In response to their prayers, the spirit of En no Gyōja gifts Fuse a set of 108 prayer beads marked with the Eight Confucian Virtues which soothe her symptoms.

Years later, Yoshizane learns of a magnificent dog in his territory that was nursed by a wild tanuki after its mother's death - he purchases the animal as a family pet, naming it Yatsufusa ("Eight Bunches") after its distinctive peony-like markings.

When Fuse is seventeen, Lord Anzai (having previously absorbed the Maro lands) turns on the Satomi, besieging their castle and apparently killing Daisuke. Yoshizane jokingly offers Yatsufusa his daughter's hand in marriage if he would only bring him the man's head, and the next day he finds that this has come true. Despite recognising the curse at work, the Satomi reluctantly honour their word. Fuse and Yatsufusa retreat to a cave atop Mount To, but Fuse remains chaste and spends all her days meditating upon the Lotus Sutra. In time Yatsufasa learns enough from her readings to develop a moral compass, rejecting Tamazusa's will. The curse still takes effect even without Yatsufusa's participation, impregnating Fuse with his children; however, due to the dog's change of heart and the lack of any physical vector, the children manifest as bodiless spirits who carry the potential for nobility.

Daisuke, revealed to have been in hiding, attempts to redeem himself by climbing Mount To and shooting Yatsufusa dead. However, Fuse also suffers a mortal wound. Yoshizane arrives soon after, and the pair witness Fuse slit her stomach to release eight spirits. These spirits then flow into the eight large beads of her necklace - Filial Piety, Justice, Loyalty, Faith, Brotherhood, Benevolence, Wisdom and Etiquette - which snap off and scatter to the winds. In penance for his deeds, Daisuke becomes a monk; changing his name to Chudai, he takes up the remains of Fuse's necklace and sets off to find the missing beads and reassemble it.

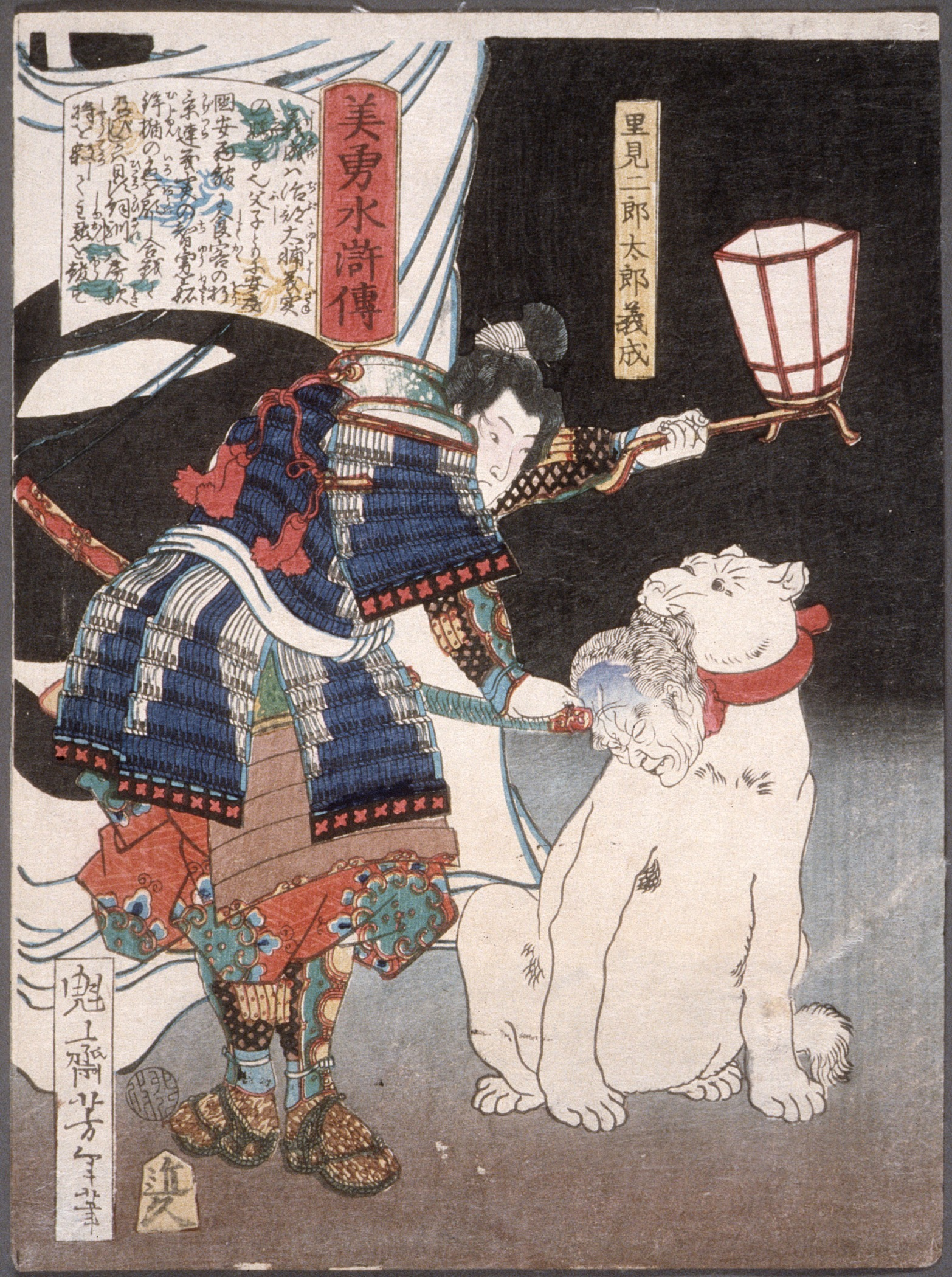
Satomi Jirotarō Yoshinari Inspecting a Head Carried by a Dog

== Inception ==
Bakin performed his research for the novel by referencing war tales about the Satomi clan and the Hōjō clan such as Satomiki (里見記), Satomi Kyudaiki (里見九代記) and Hojo Godaiki (ja:北条五代記). While the Shogenjikō Setsuyōshū attests the existence of a historical "Eight Dog Warriors" in service of the Satomi clan, their lives are not detailed, nor have they been found in any other known records of the time, making the truthfulness of their existence unclear. In the preface Bakin humorously claims that the true story of the Dog Warriors was revealed to him in a dream, but that he had forgotten most of the details by the time he wrote it down.

The narrative was heavily inspired by Chinese vernacular fiction, especially Water Margin, which had been translated and published in Japan at the beginning of the 18th century. The novel's inciting incident, where Satomi Yoshizane jokingly offers his daughter's hand in marriage to the family dog, is modelled after the tale of the dog Panhu from the Chinese In Search of the Supernatural, which is noted both by Bakin in the preface and by the characters in-story.

== Themes ==
Hakkenden's main themes are loyalty, clan honor, Bushido, Confucianism, and Buddhist philosophy.

Bakin most frequently referred to Nansō Satomi Hakkenden's genre as Haishi (commonly translated as petty history, or people's history), a Chinese genre of vernacular historical fiction. Bakin often stated that the primary purpose of the novel was to encourage virtue and chastise vice, which was central to the novel's plots and character archetypes; likening himself to the authors of Haishi in that he used entertaining stories to entice less-educated readers, who would, in turn, be taught morals through allegory. As a work of gesaku, however, the novel also contains tacit social commentary, and often plays with traditional concepts relating to gender and morality.

Hakkenden translator Glynne Walley has argued that, while the novel's effort to teach morals is clearly present (as examined in his own treatise Good Dogs), Bakin's presentation of it as a moralist work was partly a result of societal stigma against samurai producing and consuming "low-brow" fiction. In Walley's view, scholarship of the novel often focuses overmuch on this aspect while ignoring its context as a commercial serial similar to modern superhero fiction - one that uses the protagonists' commitment to easily-understood virtues to thrill its audience with the sight of larger-than-life heroes triumphing over dastardly villains.

== Publication history ==
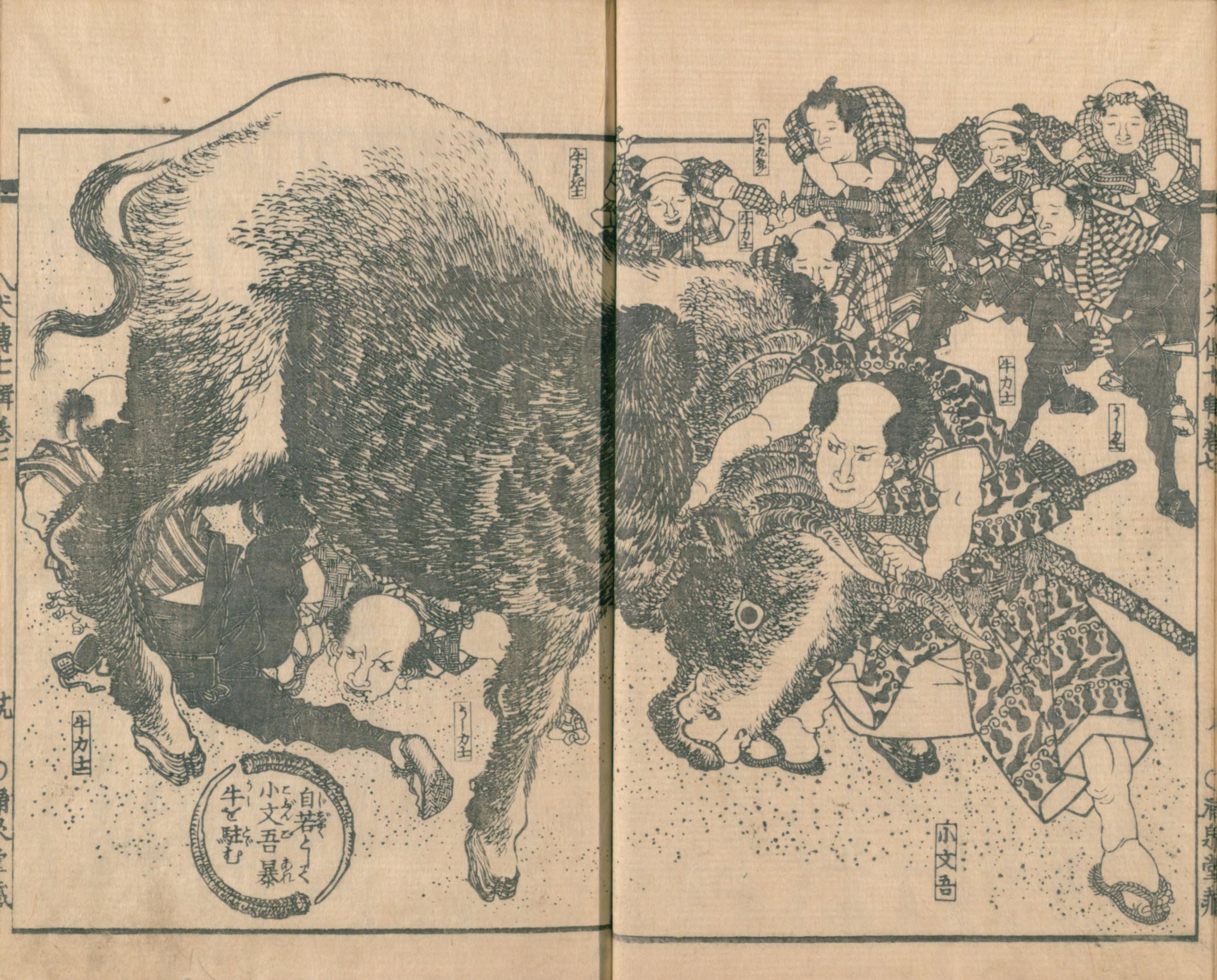
Nansō Satomi Hakkenden Volume 7.

Installments of Hakkenden followed an idiosyncratic naming pattern, with many volumes, booklets and individual chapters being divided into multiple sections (using the common 上 / 中 / 下 notation for opening, middle and conclusion). The ninth and final volume of the story developed multiple levels of subdivisions over the course of its release, becoming comparable in length to the first eight parts combined.

The first volume bears the reduced title Satomi Hakkenden on its cover, and the expanded Nansō Satomi Hakkenshiden on its endpaper (specifying the Tale of Eight Dog Warriors rather than Eight Dogs); it is also labelled Opening Volume (肇輯), as opposed to the Volume 1 (第1輯) that might be expected.

Volume prefaces and colophons include advertisements for upcoming titles, medicines from Bakin's family pharmacy, and in later installments products from other manufacturers such as cosmetics.

#	Release Title	Booklet Count	Booklets	Chapters	Year
1	Opening Volume	5	1～5	1～10	1814
2	Volume 2	5	1～5	11～20	1816
3	Volume 3	5	1～5	21～30	1819
4	Volume 4	5	1～5	31～40	1820
5	Volume 5	5	1～5	41～50	1823
6	Volume 6	6	1～5下	51～61	1827
7	Volume 7	7	1～7	62～73	1830
8	Volume 8 (上)	5	1～4下	74～82	1832
9	Volume 8 (下)	5	5～8下	83～91	1833
10	Volume 9 (上)	6	1～6	92～103	1835
11	Volume 9 (中)	7	7～12	104～115	1836
12	Volume 9 (下) - 上	5	13+14～18	116～125	1837
13	Volume 9 (下) - 中	5	19～23	126～135	1838
14	Volume 9 (下) - 下 Part 1	5	24～28	136～145	1839
15	Volume 9 (下) - 下 Part 2 (上)	5	29～32	146～153	1840
16	Volume 9 (下) - 下 Part 2 (中)	5	33～35	154～161	1840
17	Volume 9 (下) - 下 Part 3 (上)	5	36～40	162～166	1841
18	Volume 9 (下) - 下 Part 3 (中)	5	41～45	167～176	1841
19	Volume 9 (下) - 下 Part 3 (下)	10	46～53	177～180 (Conclusion)	1842

== Legacy ==
Although only a limited number of copies of the books themselves were printed, the tale was retold through various mediums, including oration and live performance, leading to its popularity among many social classes at the time. Kabuki plays based on Hakkenden were often performed, and ukiyo-e depicting kabuki actors playing the roles of eight warriors were also popular.

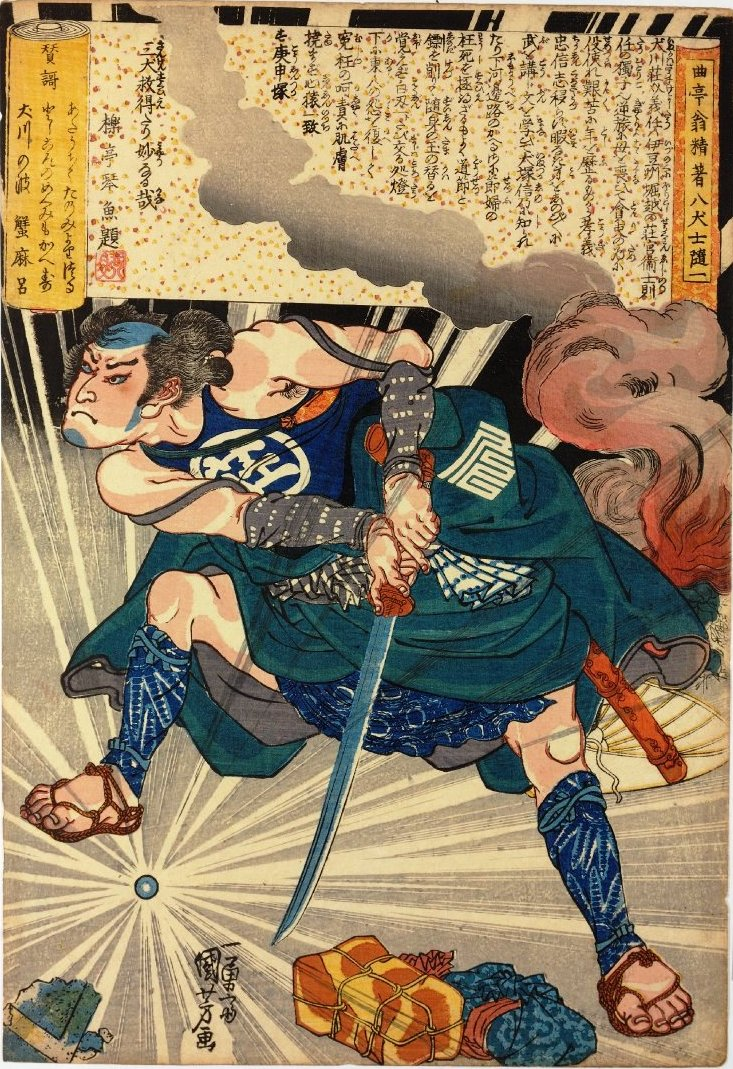
Inukawa Sōsuke. The One and Only Eight Dog History of Old Kyokutei, Best Refined authors. by Utagawa Kuniyoshi.

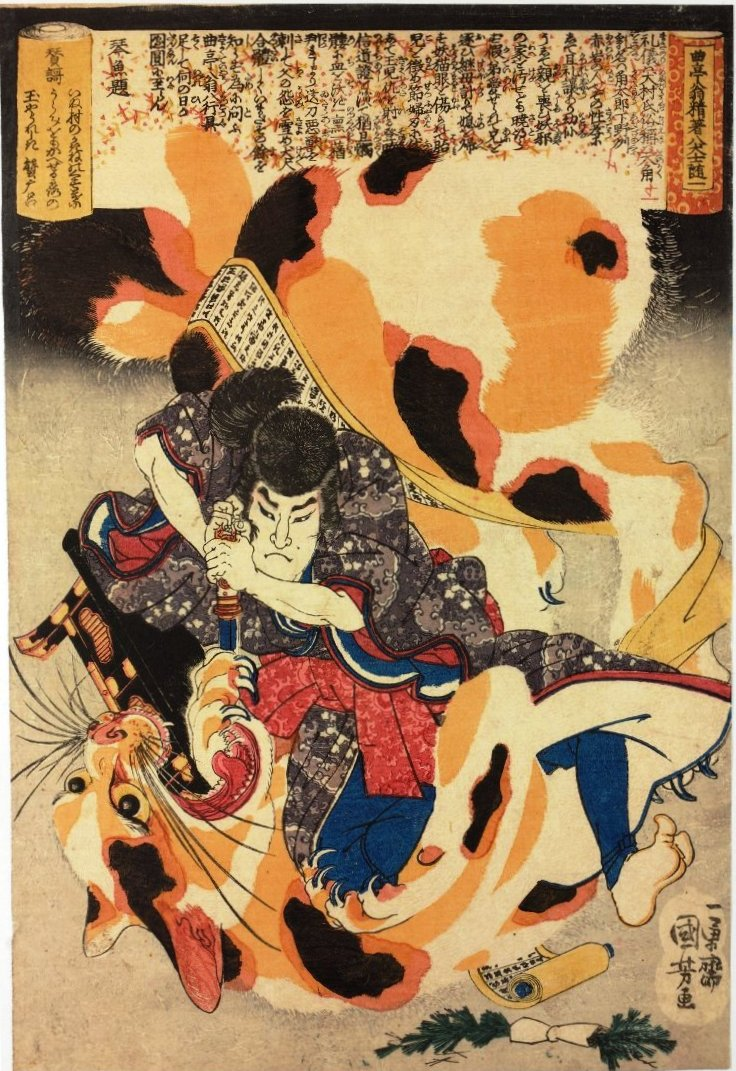
Inumura Daikaku. The One and Only Eight Dog History of Old Kyokutei, Best Refined authors. by Utagawa Kuniyoshi.

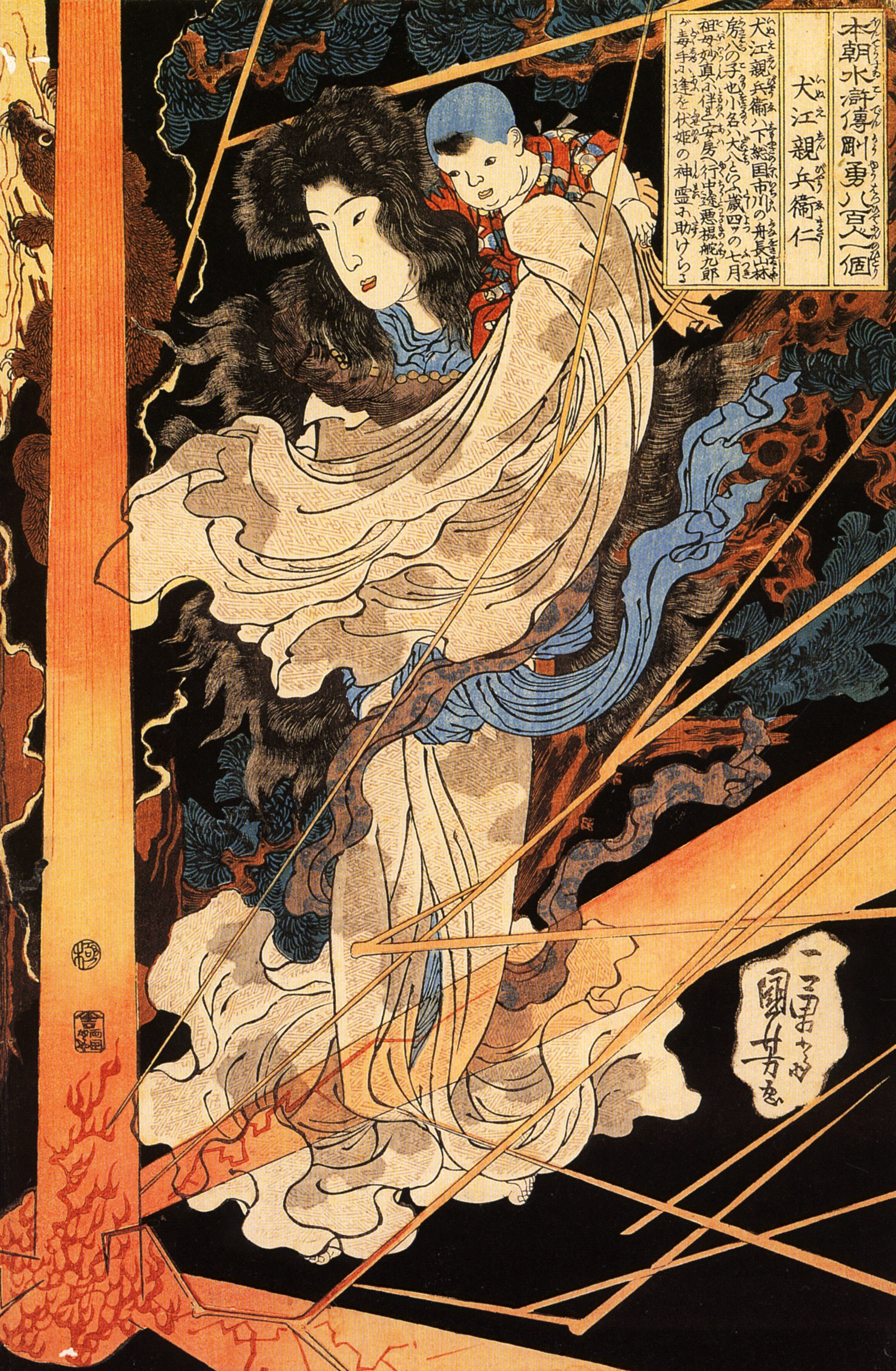
Princess Fuse saving Inue Shimbyoe Masahi from a thunderbolt. by Utagawa Kuniyoshi

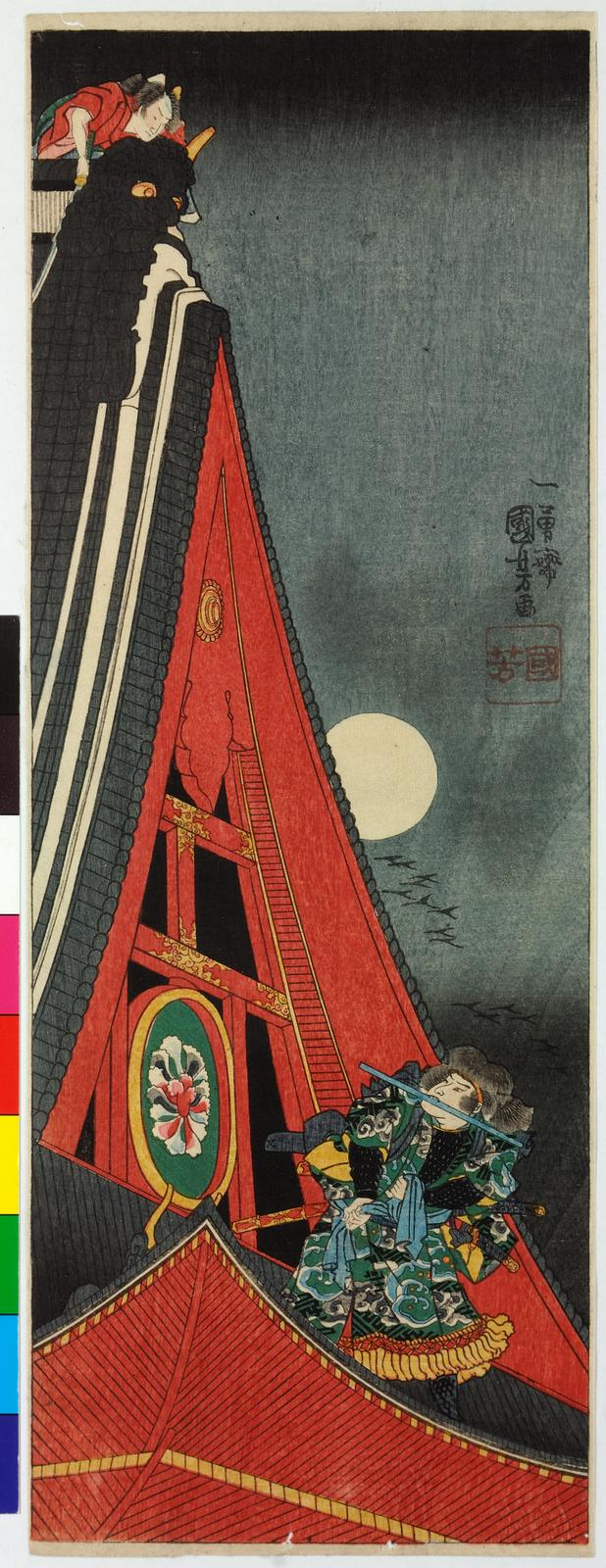
Inudzuka Shino on Hōryūkaku roof looking down on Inukai Kenpachi with geese flying below full moon. by Utagawa Kuniyoshi

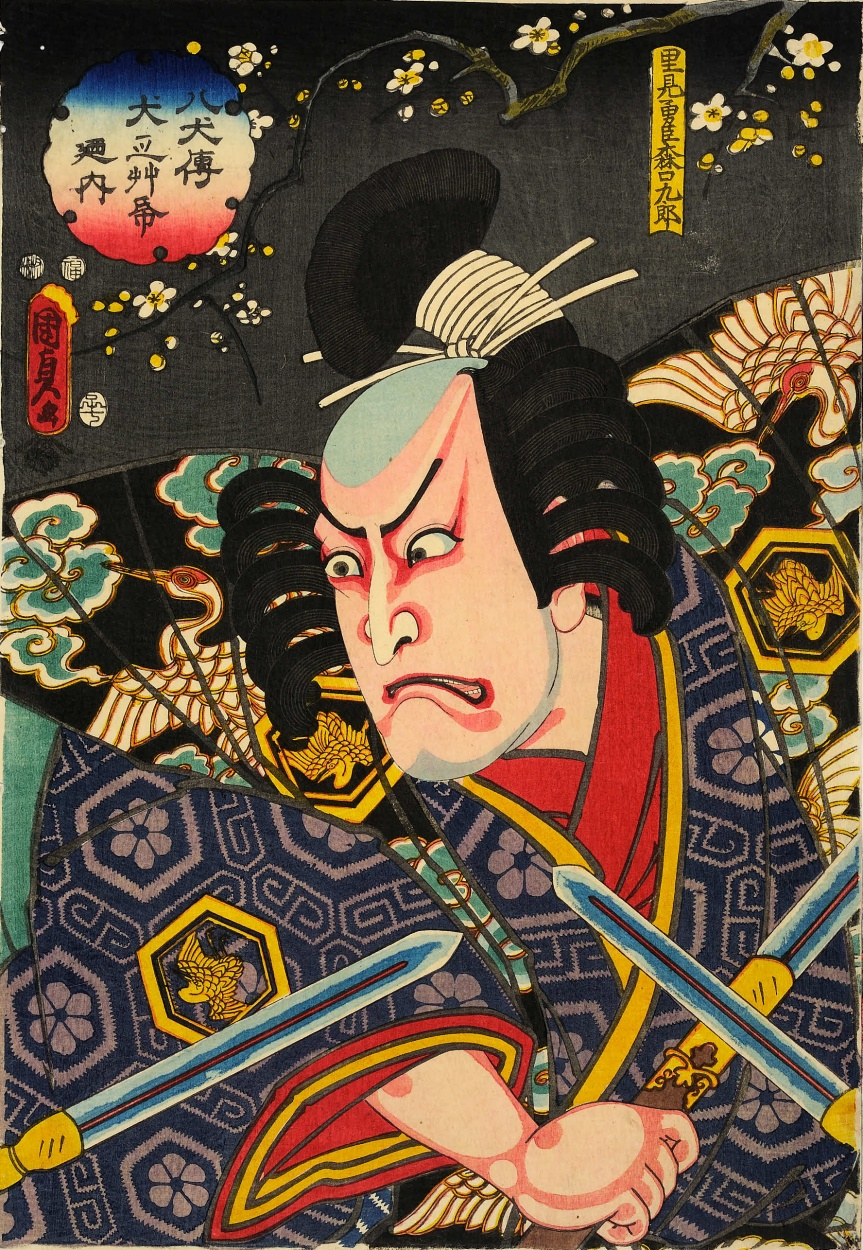
Actor Nakamura Tamasuke I (Nakamura Utaemon III) as Moriguchi Kurō, a Valiant Retainer of Satomi Yūshin. by Utagawa Kunisada II

Hakkenden, and Bakin's work at large, maintained much of its popularity amongst common people throughout the 19th century, but drew some academic criticism in the Meiji era for its didacticism and one-dimensional characters, as novelists and scholars sought to modernize Japan's literary style. Notably, in literary reformer Tsubouchi Shōyō's influential book Essence of the Novel, published 1885–1886, Bakin is lauded for both his style and his role in popularizing novels, but imitation of Bakin's work is cited as a widespread problem among novelists of the time.

In the 20th century Hakkenden became a strong influence on manga works, particularly those based on adventure quests. For example it influenced Akira Toriyama's Dragon Ball (1984) and Rumiko Takahashi's Inuyasha (1996), which both have plots about the collection of magical crystals or crystal balls, the latter also starring a human/dog hybrid similar in origin to the Dog Warriors.

Hakkenden would also shape common storytelling conventions of the JRPG genre; in addition to its emphasis on the dynamics of a growing party over the strength and agency of a lone hero (which has precedent in earlier tales like Momotarō), it popularised the idea of unaware heroes who learn of their destiny over the course of the story. An example of this influence can be found in Shin Megami Tensei: Digital Devil Saga (2004), where the characters unlock powers from their demonic heritage which both reflect their personalities and are accompanied by a distinguishing mark appearing on their bodies.

=== Literature ===
- Teisō Fujo Hakkenshi (1834-1848)
- Koi no Yatsufuji: Dansō Satomi Hakkenden (1837), a parody.
- Setsubai Kōtan: Inu no Soushi (1848-1881) is a simplified gōkan edition of the novel by Ryuutei Senka.
- Kanayomi Hakkenden (1848-1867), a competing gōkan edition of the novel.
- Hakkenden Gojitsudan (1853-1857) - roughly "Hakkenden: The Sequel", a novel by one of the authors of Kanayomi Hakkenden which centres on the Dog Warrior's children and grandchildren.
- Ninpō Hakkenden (1964), part of Futaro Yamada's Ninpōchō series, features descendants of the original Eight Dog Warriors.
- Shin Satomi Hakkenden (1982) is a retelling of the story.
- Hakkenden (1983) by Futaro Yamada, planned as the second entry in a "Hakkenden trilogy" begun by his earlier Ninpō Hakkenden.
- Shōnen Hakkenden (1988, 2006)
- Yōseiki Suikoden (1990-1995) features a group of antagonists called the "Habyōshi" (Eight Cat Warriors) modelled on the Hakkenshi.
- Fusé Gansaku: Satomi Hakkenden (2010) by Kazuki Sakuraba, set during Hakkenden's publication, purports that Bakin based his story on an actual tribe of murderous werewolf-like beings called fuse, descendants of a Princess Fuse who willingly ran away with Yatsufusa and lived as an animal in order to escape her cruel family.

=== Television ===
- Satomi Hakkenden (1964), produced by Fuji TV
- Satomi Hakkenden (1964), produced by NET
- Shin Hakkenden (1973), a puppet-based adaptation
- Denshi Sentai Denjiman (1980), a series which established many conventions of the long-running Super Sentai franchise, is reported to have taken inspiration from Hakkenden. This includes replacing the unified taskforce protagonists of earlier installments with a team of strangers brought together by destiny.
- Corrector Yui (1999) is a magical girl anime with motifs drawn from the 70s Shin Hakkenden series.
- Shin Hakkenden (1999), an animated series distinguished from similarly-named adaptations by its spelling "Legend of the Eight Divine Swords" (神八剣伝').
- Fukaku Kugure: Hakkenden 2001 (2000)
- Satomi Hakkenden (2006)
- Hakkenden: Eight Dogs of the East (2013), a partial animated adaptation of the manga of the same name.
- Six Hearts Princess (2016), an anime featuring a group of eight magical girls themed after the Dog Warriors - each embodying one of the Confucian Virtues and having a peony mark somewhere on their body.

=== Film ===
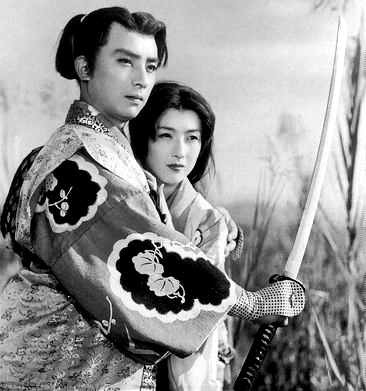
Chiyonosuke Azuma and Shinobu Chihara in Satomi Hakken-den (Tōei, 1954)

- Hakkenden (1913)
- Satomi Hakkenden (1937)
- Tonchinkan Hakkenden (1953)
- Sorcerer's Orb (1954) - Japanese title "Satomi Hakkenden"
- You'un Satomi Kaikyoden: Zengo-hen (1956)
- Satomi hakken-den (1959)
- Message from Space (1978), which transplants the story to space opera
- Legend of the Eight Samurai (1983), an adaptation of the novel Shin Satomi Hakkenden and in Japan titled simply "Satomi Hakkenden".
- The Hakkenden (1990), an OVA.
- Fuse Teppō Musume no Torimonochō (2012), an animated adaptation of Fusé Gansaku: Satomi Hakkenden which mixes the horror stylings of the 2010 novel with elements of the original Hakkenden in order to recast it as a supernatural romance.
- Wolf Children (2012) is the story of a human/wolf couple modelled after Fuse and Yatsufusa, also featuring a number of supporting characters named after the Dog Warriors or their corresponding virtues.
- Saber + Zenkaiger: Super Hero Senki (2021) features characters from the Kamen Rider and Super Sentai franchises becoming trapped in the story of Hakkenden.
- Hakkenden: Fiction and Reality (2024) is a biopic of author Takizawa Bakin intercut with a loose adaptation of the novel's story (the latter modelled on the 1983 Futaro Yamada retelling).

=== Theatre ===
The novel has also been adapted into kabuki theatre several times.

- In August 2006, the Kabuki-za staged a performance.
- In August 2026, Ryu Ga Gotoku: Kamurocho Hakkenden, a stage play with an original story based on the Yakuza series borrowing several elements of the novel, will be staged.

=== Comic Books ===
- Dragon Ball (1984) uses Fuse's beads as the basis of the titular Dragon Balls, a collection of seven crystal spheres with different markings which can be brought together to summon a wish-granting dragon. After use, the balls scatter in a manner similar to the scene of the Dog Warriors' birth.
- Nansō Satomi Hakkenden (1985) by Motoyama Hazuki
- Hakkenden (1989-2005)
- MANGA Nansō Satomi Hakkenden (1991-1992)
- X (1992) took inspiration from Hakkenden for its ensemble cast, consisting of characters from creator CLAMP's previous works.
- Nansō Satomi Hakkenden (1993)
- Yatsufusa Koi Shou (1994) by Shinohara Udou
- Hakken Densetsu: Yōkai Satomi Chūgaku (1999) by Kanako Inuki is a horror manga series based on the story.
- Hakkenden: Eight Dogs of the East (2005) is a shoujo manga based on the story.
- Hakkenshi (2005), a work by Okamura Kenji focused on the character of Inuzuka Shino.
- Sengoku Satomi Hakkenden: Episode Zero (2009) by Tatsuya Egawa.
- Manga de yomu: Nansō Satomi Hakkenden (2015), focused on the character of Inue Shinbei.
- Eight Dogs (2016) is a comic based on the unofficial sequel novel Ninpō Hakkenden, published in Comic Ran Twins.

=== Video Games ===
- Yōma Ninpōchō (1986) is an arcade shooter game inspired by the 1983 Shin Satomi Hakkenden film.
- Idol Hakkenden (1989), a visual novel for the Famicom where eight idol singers assemble in a similar manner to the Dog Warriors.
- Makai Hakkenden Shada (1989), an action RPG for the PC Engine with gameplay similar to the Ys series, developed by Data East.
- Satomi Hakkenden (1989), a role-playing game for the Famicom developed by Alpha Denshi and published by SNK.
- Shin Satomi Hakkenden: Hikari to Yami no Tatakai (1989), a role-playing game for the Famicom developed by Micronics and published by Toei, based on the 1982 novel Shin Satomi Hakkenden and its film adaptation. It features the gimmick of allowing the player to start as any one of the Eight Dog Warriors in different locations across the map, with the goal of eventually uniting the entire party.
- Romancing SaGa (1992) features a nonlinear story of eight player characters who exist in the same world, the number being chosen in reference to the similar storytelling of Hakkenden.
- Ōkami (2006) features a story arc in which the player character is recruited by a woman named Fuse to collect the "Satomi Power Orbs" from eight trained dogs who serve her family.
- Satomi Hakkenden Hachiju no Ki (Feb 2014), and its 2 sequels Satomi Hakkenden Hamaji Hime no Ki (Sep 2014) and Satomi Hakkenden Murasamemaru no Ki (2015), are 3 Japanese fantasy/dating sim otome games developed by QuinRose for the PlayStation Portable. They are based on the Nansō Satomi Hakkenden. The first game also has been adapted into a manga, called the Futari no Akai Ito Satomi Hakkenden Hachiju no Ki (2014), with one volume.
- In Fate/Grand Order the novel forms the basis of the Jun/July 2022 event Nanmei Yumihari Hakkenden, starring a Kyokutei Bakin who became a Heroic Spirit with powers based on elements of his magnum opus.

== Translations ==
A complete reprinting in ten volumes is available in the original Japanese, as well as various modern Japanese translations, most of them abridged. Only a few chapters have been translated into English, Chapter 25 by Donald Keene, and Chapters 12, 13, and 19 by Chris Drake.

In 2021 the first volume of an intended complete translation (Glynne Walley's Eight Dogs, or "Hakkenden" Part One – An Ill-Considered Jest) was published by Cornell University Press, consisting of the first fourteen chapters of the story (spanning the original Volume 1 and part of Volume 2). A second volume, His Master's Blade, was published.

== See also ==
- Jiraiya
- Murasame
- Sanada Ten Braves
- Seven Samurai
- Water Margin ("Suikoden")
