= Sorcerer's Orb =

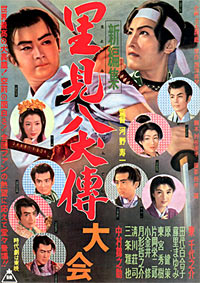
- Japanese movie poster
- Directed by: Toshikazu Kōno
- Written by: Kyokutei Bakin (novel); Michihei Matsumura (writer)
- Produced by: Toei
- Release date: May 31, 1954
- Running time: 55 minutes
- Country: Japan
- Language: Japanese

Sorcerer's Orb (里見八犬伝, Satomi Hakkenden) is a five-part 1954 black-and-white Japanese film series directed by Toshikazu Kōno.

The film is based on the 1814-1842 novel Nansō Satomi Hakkenden by Kyokutei Bakin.

Movie list:

- Sorcerer's Orb part 1 Cursed Demon Sword: Murasame-maru 里見八犬伝 第一部 妖刀村雨丸 (1954)
- Sorcerer's Orb part 2 Showdown at Horyukaku: Dragon vs Tiger 里見八犬伝 第二部 芳流閣の龍虎 (1954)
- Sorcerer's Orb part 3 Dance of the Ghost Cat 里見八犬伝 第三部 怪猫乱舞 (1954)
- Sorcerer's Orb part 4 Clan of Eight Warriors 里見八犬伝 第四部 血盟八剣士 (1954)
- Sorcerer's Orb part 5 Crimson Moon Battle cry 里見八犬伝 完結篇 暁の勝鬨 (1954)

== Cast ==
- Azuma Chiyonosuke
- Yorozuya Kinnosuke
- Yuriko Tashiro
- Atsushi Watanabe
- Kanji Kosakae
- Masaya Sanjō

== Plot ==
The fate of the Satomi Clan lies in the hands of 8 warriors of prophecy, each of whom were born with a crystal orb. The monk, Daisuke, embarks on a journey to find these warriors and reunite the 8 orbs they carry so that they may fulfill their destiny.

== Original story ==
The original story was the signature work of Edo period author Takzawa Bakin, called "Nanso Satomi Hakkenden". It was first published nearly 200 years ago in 1815. "Nanso" in the title refers to an area that is today southern Chiba Prefecture. Takizawa's Tale combines stories of the Satomi Clan, an actual family that controlled an area centered in southern Chiba from about 1450 until the early Edo period, with elements from the Chinese story known as "Suikoden". "Nanso Satomi Hakkenden" is a master-work that took Takizawa 106 volumes and 28 years to complete

== Release ==
The film performed well at the box office.

== See also ==
- Legend of the Eight Samurai (里見八犬伝, Satomi Hakkenden), a 1983 adaptation
