= Three Fundamental Bonds and Five Constant Virtues =

Confucian teaching

In Confucianism, the Sangang Wuchang (Chinese: 三綱五常; pinyin: Sāngāng Wǔcháng), sometimes translated as the Three Fundamental Bonds and Five Constant Virtues or the Three Guiding Principles and Five Constant Regulations, or more simply "bonds and virtues" (gāngcháng 綱常), are the three most important human relationships and the five most important virtues. They are considered the moral and political requirements of Confucianism as well as the eternal unchanging "essence of life and bonds of society."

== History ==
The expression of Sāngāng Wǔcháng is no older than the Han dynasty, when it was first articulated by Dong Zhongshu (179–104 BCE), and was not commonly used until the 10th century CE. From the 11th century onward, later Neo-Confucianism heavily emphasized the three bonds and five virtues, believing that humans of any class or family could become a junzi (君子) the equivalent to sages, through perfecting these relationships and virtues in their every day lives.

== Meaning ==
=== Three Bonds ===
The three bonds (sāngāng; 三綱) are between father and son, lord and retainer, and husband and wife and they constitute three of the five relationships (五倫; wǔlún) described in the Mencius. According to Hsu Dau-lin, the concept of the Three Bonds was originally a Legalist idea and mirrors the ancient philosophy of the Three Treasures (三寶; sānbǎo) within early Chinese culture.

The lord is yang 陽, the retainer is yin 陰; the father is yang, the son is yin; the husband is yang, the wife is yin. The way of yin cannot proceed any where on its own.... Therefore, the retainer depends on his lord to gain merit; the son depends on his father; the wife on her husband, yin on yang, and the Earth on Heaven.... The Three [Fundamental Bonds] of the kingly way can be sought in Heaven.

— Chapter 53 of the Book of Han

=== Five Virtues ===
The five most important virtues are benevolence (ren 仁), righteousness (yi 義), propriety (li 禮), wisdom (zhi 智), and trustworthiness (xin 信). The first four virtues were grouped together in the Mengzi. The fifth virtue, xin, was added by Dong Zhongshu. Trustworthiness, or sincerity, is considered the most important of the five virtues, and the foundation for the other virtues. The remaining virtues derive from the Four Sprouts described by Mencius in the Confucian classic of the same name.

Benevolence is described as "forming one body" in relation to others, which requires seeing ourselves as extensions of others and vice versa. Paradigm cases of ren include acts of love or acting in others' interests, such as taking care of a family member, the foundation for the Chinese term filial piety or xiao (孝) .

Righteousness is when someone refuses to violate prohibitions that would be regarded as shameful or degrading such as bribery. Righteousness can be seen as the distribution of goods according to one's merit and position.

Propriety or li is broader in scope than the English word would entail. It is when someone performs a ritual with reverence, covering social protocol in situations that require a sense of respect, such as common everyday greetings and gestures and to a larger extent social and formal occasions including weddings, funerals, and service.

Wisdom is understanding the other virtues' characteristic motives and feelings, correctly assessing the quality of a person's character, and knowing the best means to achieve virtuous ends.

Trustworthiness or faithfulness is understood as commitment to reality in a consistent and reliable way. Some Confucians did not consider xin to be its own domain of activity since it centrally regulates and supports all virtues. They all require one to be aware of what is real and avoid self-serving delusions.

What are the Five Constant Virtues? They are benevolence, righteousness, propriety, wisdom, and trustworthiness. Benevolence means not being able to endure (seeing others suffer), loving others, and aiding all living things. Righteousness means doing what is proper. In making judgments one hits the mark. Propriety means to enact. That is, to realize the way and perfect the refined. Wisdom means knowledge. One has a special understanding and can know things before hearing about them. He is not befuddled by matters and can discern the subtle. Trustworthiness means sincerity. One cannot be deterred from his purpose. Therefore, people are born and respond to the Eight Trigrams, thereby obtaining the five energies (qi 氣) that are the Constant Virtues.

— Chapter 30 of Bai Hu Tong

== See also ==
- Four Cardinal Principles and Eight Virtues
- Three Obediences and Four Virtues

== Bibliography ==
- Knapp, Keith (2003). "Ren lun 人倫 (Human relationships)". In Yao, Xinzhong (ed.). Encyclopedia of Confucianism. Abingdon, UK: Routledge. pp. 501–503.
- Knapp, Keith K. (2009). "Three Fundamental Bonds and Five Constant Virtues" (PDF). Berkshire Encyclopedia of China. Vol. 5. Great Barrington, MA: Berkshire Publishing Group. pp. 2252–2255 – via Chinaconnectu.com.
- Thacker, Tod Cameron (2003a). "San gang 三綱 (Three Cardinal Guides)". In Yao, Xinzhong (ed.). Encyclopedia of Confucianism. Abingdon, UK: Routledge. p. 522.
- Thacker, Tod Cameron (2003b). "Wu chang 五常 (Five constant virtues)". In Yao, Xinzhong (ed.). Encyclopedia of Confucianism. Abingdon, UK: Routledge. p. 660.
- Thacker, Tod Cameron (2003c). "Xin 信 (Trust, faithfulness)". In Yao, Xinzhong (ed.). Encyclopedia of Confucianism. Abingdon, UK: Routledge. pp. 685–686.
- Tiwald, Justin (19 March 2020). "Song-Ming Confucianism". In Zalta, Edward N. (ed.). Stanford Encyclopedia of Philosophy (Summer 2020 ed.). ISSN 1095-5054. OCLC 429049174.
- Yao, Xinzhong (2000). An Introduction to Confucianism. Cambridge University Press. ISBN 978-1-139-43144-6.
