= Murasame =

Murasame (村雨, Murasame; literally "village rain", though often translated as "autumn rain"), refers to a type of rain that falls hard, then gently, in fits and starts. In Japanese poetic tradition, it is particularly associated with the cold rains of autumn.

Murasame may refer to:

== Fiction ==
- Murasame-maru (村雨丸), the magical katana of protagonist Inuzuka Shino in the 19th century novel Nansō Satomi Hakkenden; named for its water-generating abilities which cause its blade to be repeatedly washed clean of blood in battle
- MVF-M11C Murasame, a combat vehicle from Mobile Suit Gundam SEED Destiny
- Nazo no Murasame Jō, a 1986 video game for Nintendo's Famicom Disk System
- tsure Murasame, one of two sisters in the Noh drama Matsukaze
- Murasame Liger, a mecha from Zoids: Genesis
- One Slice Kill: Murasame, a long katana from the Akame ga Kill! manga and anime
- A demon known to turn into a deity-slaying katana in Hakkenden: Touhou Hakken Ibun (a loose adaptation of Nansō Satomi Hakkenden)
- A cursed broom that brings bad luck upon the user, later turned into a shikigami by Machi in Nagasarete Airantou
- Don Murasame, the humanoid avatar of the Ninjark Sword in Avataro Sentai Donbrothers.
- Murasama, A weapon from the game Metal Gear Rising, wielded by Jetstream Sam
- Murasame, A UNCF class of cruiser in SPACE BATTLESHIP YAMATO 2199 Built before the Earth garmillas war

== Ships ==
- Murasame-class destroyer, two classes of destroyers of the Japan Maritime Self-Defense Force
- Japanese destroyer Murasame, four destroyers of the Imperial Japanese Navy and the Japan Maritime Self-Defense Force

== Other ==
- Murasame, a dōjin soft hobbyist group

== See also ==
- Masamune
- Muramasa
