= Yojimbo =

1961 jidaigeki film by Akira Kurosawa

- Theatrical release poster

Japanese name
- Kanji: 用心棒
- Literal meaning: Bodyguard
Transcriptions
- Revised Hepburn: Yōjinbō
- Directed by: Akira Kurosawa
- Screenplay by: Ryūzō Kikushima; Akira Kurosawa; Hideo Oguni
- Story by: Akira Kurosawa
- Produced by: Tomoyuki Tanaka; Ryūzō Kikushima; Akira Kurosawa
- Starring: Toshiro Mifune; Tatsuya Nakadai; Yoko Tsukasa; Isuzu Yamada; Daisuke Katō; Takashi Shimura; Kamatari Fujiwara; Atsushi Watanabe
- Cinematography: Kazuo Miyagawa
- Edited by: Akira Kurosawa
- Music by: Masaru Sato
- Production companies: Kurosawa Production; Toho
- Distributed by: Toho
- Release date: 25 April 1961 (Japan)
- Running time: 110 minutes
- Country: Japan
- Language: Japanese
- Budget: ¥90.87 million (US$631,000)
- Box office: $2.5 million (est.)

Yojimbo (Japanese: 用心棒, Hepburn: Yōjinbō; lit. Bodyguard) is a 1961 Japanese jidaigeki film directed by Akira Kurosawa, who also co-wrote the screenplay and was one of the producers. The film stars Toshiro Mifune, Tatsuya Nakadai, Yoko Tsukasa, Isuzu Yamada, Daisuke Katō, Takashi Shimura, Kamatari Fujiwara, and Atsushi Watanabe. In the film, a rōnin arrives in a small town where competing crime lords fight for supremacy. The two bosses each try to hire the newcomer as a bodyguard.

Based on the success of Yojimbo, Kurosawa's next film, Sanjuro (1962), was altered to incorporate the lead character of this film. In both films, the character wears a worn dark kimono bearing the same family mon. (Note: The mon Mifune's character wears in both films is the Maruni Kenkatabami (丸に剣片喰), which is the mon of director Akira Kurosawa.)

The film was released and produced by Toho on April 25, 1961. Yojimbo received highly positive reviews, and, over the years, became widely regarded as one of the best films by Kurosawa. The film grossed an estimated US$2.5 million worldwide with a budget of ¥90.87 million ($631,000). Its story was plagiarized by Sergio Leone in his Spaghetti Western A Fistful of Dollars (1964), leading to a lawsuit by Toho.

== Plot ==
In 1860, during the final years of the Edo period, a rōnin wanders through a desolate countryside. Stopping at a farmhouse for water, he overhears an elderly couple lamenting that their only son has run off to join the "gamblers" in a nearby town, which is overrun with criminals and contested by two rival yakuza gangs.

In the town, the rōnin stops at a small izakaya (tavern). The owner Gonji advises the rōnin to leave, and tells him that the two warring bosses, Ushitora and Seibei, are fighting over the lucrative gambling trade run by Seibei. Ushitora had been Seibei's right-hand man until Seibei decided that his successor would be his son Yoichiro, a useless youth. The town's mayor, a silk merchant named Tazaemon, had long been in Seibei's pocket, so Ushitora aligned himself with the local saké-brewer, Tokuemon, proclaiming him the new mayor.

After sizing up the situation and recognizing that no one in town cares about ending the violence, the rōnin says he intends to stay, as the town would be better off with both sides dead. He convinces the weaker Seibei to hire his services by effortlessly killing three of Ushitora's men. When asked his name, he sees a mulberry-field and states his name is Kuwabatake ("mulberry-field") Sanjuro ("thirty-years-old") (桑畑三十郎). (Note: 三十郎 Sanjuro is a proper given name (and therefore could very well be the rōnin's true name), but it can also be interpreted as meaning "thirty-years-old", and Sanjuro wryly adds that "it's closer to forty".)

Seibei decides that with the rōnin's help, it is time to deal with Ushitora. Sanjuro eavesdrops on Seibei's wife, who orders Yoichiro to prove himself by killing the rōnin after the upcoming raid, saving them from having to pay him. Sanjuro leads the attack on Ushitora's faction, but then "resigns" over Seibei's treachery, expecting both sides to massacre each other. His plan is foiled due to the unexpected arrival of a bugyō (a government official), which prompts both Seibei and Ushitora to make a bloodless retreat.

The bugyō leaves soon after to investigate the assassination of a fellow official in another town. Overhearing the assassins discussing the hit in Gonji's tavern, Sanjuro later captures them and sells them to Seibei. Then he comes to Ushitora and tells him Seibei's men caught the assassins. Alarmed, Ushitora generously rewards Sanjuro for his "help" and kidnaps Yoichiro to exchange for the two assassins. At the swap, Ushitora's brother Unosuke kills the assassins with a pistol.

Anticipating this, Seibei reveals he had ordered the kidnapping of Tokuemon's mistress. The next morning, she is exchanged for Yoichiro. Sanjuro learns that the mistress, Nui, is a local farmer's wife. After he sold her to Ushitora to settle a gambling debt, Ushitora gave her to Tokuemon as chattel to gain his support. After tricking Ushitora into revealing where Nui is held, Sanjuro kills the guards and reunites the woman with her husband and son. He gives them some money and orders them to leave town immediately. He comes to Ushitora and informs him that Seibei is responsible for killing his men.

The gang war escalates, with Ushitora burning down Tazaemon's silk warehouse and Seibei retaliating by attacking Tokuemon's saké-brewery. After some time, Unosuke becomes suspicious of Sanjuro and the circumstances surrounding Nui's escape, eventually uncovering evidence of the rōnin's betrayal. Sanjuro is severely beaten and imprisoned by Ushitora's thugs, who torture him to find out Nui's whereabouts. When Ushitora decides to eliminate Seibei once and for all, Sanjuro escapes. Smuggled out of town in a coffin by Gonji, Sanjuro witnesses the brutal end of Seibei and his family. He then recuperates in a small temple near a cemetery.

Upon learning that Gonji has been captured by Ushitora, Sanjuro returns to town and dispatches Ushitora, Unosuke, and their gang in a final confrontation. He spares a terrified young man, the son of the elderly couple from the opening, and sends him back to his parents. As Sanjuro surveys the damage, a now deranged Tazaemon comes out of his home in a samurai outfit and stabs Tokuemon to death. Sanjuro frees Gonji, orders Hansuke to kill himself, proclaims that the town will be quiet from then on, and departs.

== Cast ==
- Toshiro Mifune as "Kuwabatake Sanjuro" (桑畑 三十郎), a wandering rōnin and master swordsman who provokes two gangs into open war.
- Eijirō Tōno as Gonji (権爺), owner of the izakaya (tavern), and the rōnin's ally and confidant.
- Tatsuya Nakadai as Unosuke (卯之助), a gun-toting gangster and younger brother to both Ushitora and Inokichi.
- Seizaburo Kawazu as Seibei (清兵衛), the original boss of the town's underworld. He operates out of a brothel.
- Kyū Sazanka as Ushitora (丑寅), the other gang leader in town. He was originally Seibei's lieutenant, but he broke ranks to start his own syndicate in a succession dispute.
- Isuzu Yamada as Orin (おりん), the wife of Seibei, and the brains behind her husband's criminal operations.
- Daisuke Katō as Inokichi (亥之吉), younger brother of Ushitora and older brother to Unosuke. He is a strong fighter, but is very dim-witted and easily fooled.
- Takashi Shimura as Tokuemon (徳右衛門), a saké-brewer who claims to be the new mayor.
- Hiroshi Tachikawa as Yoichiro (倅与一郎), the timid son of Seibei and Orin who shows little inclination to take over his father's gang.
- Yosuke Natsuki as the farmer's son, a young man seen running away from home at the beginning of the film who joins Ushitora's gang.
- Kamatari Fujiwara as Tazaemon (多左衛門), the town mayor and silk-merchant who is going insane from fear.
- Ikio Sawamura as Hansuke (半助), the town constable who is completely corrupt and concerned only with keeping himself alive.
- Atsushi Watanabe as the town's coffin-maker, who is profiting heavily from the gang war but ultimately chooses to help Sanjuro and Gonji put an end to it.
- Susumu Fujita as Honma (本間), Seibei's "master swordsman" who deserts his employer before a battle with Ushitora's men, allowing Sanjuro to take his place.
- Sachio Sakai as Ashigaru
- Yoko Tsukasa as Nui (ぬい), the wife of Kohei. She was taken prisoner by Tokuemon because of her beauty after her husband could not pay back his gambling debts.
- Yoshio Tsuchiya as Kohei (小平), the husband of Nui who lost all of his money on gambling and frequently gets beaten for trying to visit his wife.
- Tsunagoro Rashomon as Kannuki (かんぬき), Ushitora's acromegalic enforcer.

== Production ==
=== Writing ===
Kurosawa stated that a major source for the plot was the 1942 film noir classic The Glass Key, an adaptation of Dashiell Hammett's 1931 novel of the same name. It has been noted that the overall plot of Yojimbo is closer to that of another Hammett novel, Red Harvest (1929). Kurosawa scholar David Desser, and film critic Manny Farber claim that Red Harvest was the inspiration for the film; however, Donald Richie and other scholars believe the similarities are coincidental.

When asked his name, the samurai calls himself "Kuwabatake Sanjuro", which he seems to make up while looking at a mulberry-field by the town. Thus, the character can be viewed as an early example of the "Man with No Name" (other examples of which appear in several earlier works, including Red Harvest).

=== Casting ===
Many of the actors in Yojimbo worked with Kurosawa before and after, especially Toshiro Mifune, Takashi Shimura and Tatsuya Nakadai. Kannuki, Ushitora's giant enforcer, is played by Taiwanese-born Tsunagoro Rashomon (Zhao Yiyue), a former sumo wrestler and professional wrestler.

=== Filming ===
After Kurosawa scolded Mifune for arriving late to the set one morning, Mifune made it a point to be ready on set at 6:00 a.m. every day in full makeup and costume for the rest of the film's shooting schedule.

This was the second film where director Akira Kurosawa worked with cinematographer Kazuo Miyagawa (the first being Rashomon in 1950). The sword instruction and choreography for the film were done by Yoshio Sugino of the Tenshin Shōden Katori Shintō-ryū and Ryū Kuze.

=== Music ===
The soundtrack for the film has received positive reviews. Michael Wood writing retrospectively for the London Review of Books found the film's soundtrack by Masaru Sato as effective in its "jaunty and jangling" approach stating:

The film is full of music, for instance, a loud, witty soundtrack by Masaru Sato, who said his main influence was Henry Mancini. It doesn't sound like Breakfast at Tiffany's, though, or Days of Wine and Roses. The blaring Latin sound of Touch of Evil comes closer, but actually you wouldn't think of Mancini if you hadn't been told. Sato's effect has lots of drums, mixes traditional Japanese flutes and other instruments with American big band noises, and feels jaunty and jangling throughout, discreetly off, as if half the band was playing in the wrong key. It's distracting at first, then you realise it's not decoration, it's commentary. It's a companion to Sanjuro, the sound of his mind, discordant and undefeated and unserious, even when he's grubby and silent and apparently solemn.

== Release ==
Yojimbo was released in Japan on 25 April 1961. The film was released by Seneca International in both a subtitled and dubbed format in the United States in September 1961.

=== Box office ===
Yojimbo was Japan's fourth highest-grossing film of 1961, earning a distribution rental income of ¥351 million. This was equivalent to estimated box office gross receipts of approximately ¥659 million ($1.83 million).

Overseas, the film had a September 1961 release in North America, but the box office income of this release is currently unknown. At the 2002 Kurosawa & Mifune Festival in the United States, the film grossed $561,692. In South Korea, a 2012 re-release grossed ₩1.566 million ($1,390).

In Europe, a January 1991 limited French re-release sold 14,178 tickets, equivalent to an estimated gross revenue of approximately €63,801 ($87,934). Other limited European re-releases sold 3,392 tickets between 2000 and 2018, equivalent to an estimated gross revenue of at least €18,995 ($27,938). This adds up to an estimated $678,950 grossed overseas, and an estimated $2,508,950 grossed worldwide.

Adjusted for ticket price inflation, at 2012 Japanese ticket prices, its Japanese gross receipts are equivalent to an estimated ¥9.75 billion ($122 million), or $171 million adjusted for inflation in 2025. The overseas gross revenue of North American and European re-releases since 1991 are equivalent to approximately $1.6 million adjusted for inflation, adding up to an estimated inflation-adjusted total gross of over $137 million worldwide.

=== Critical response ===
Yojimbo was nominated for the Academy Award for Best Costume Design at the 34th Academy Awards. Toshiro Mifune won the Volpi Cup for Best Actor at the 22nd Venice Film Festival.

A 1968 screening in the planned community of Columbia, Maryland was considered too violent for viewers, causing the hosts to hide in the bathroom to avoid the audience.

Pauline Kael described the film as Kurosawa's "first shaggy man" movie going on to call it a wonderful satire-comedy and "farce of force."

In a retrospective look at the film Michael Wood writing for the London Review of Books found the film to span several genres and compared it to other western and samurai films from the 1950s, 60s, and 70s, such as Seven Samurai, A Fistful of Dollars, High Noon, The Outlaw Josey Wales, and Rashomon, stating, "(The film contains) comedy, satire, folk tale, action movie, Western, samurai film, and something like a musical without songs. As everyone says, this work is not as deep as Rashomon or as immediately memorable as Seven Samurai. But it is funnier than any Western from either side of the world, and its only competition, in a bleaker mode, would be Clint Eastwood’s The Outlaw Josey Wales (1976)." In 2009 the film was voted at No. 23 on the list of The Greatest Japanese Films of All Time by Japanese film magazine Kinema Junpo. Yojimbo was also ranked at #95 in Empire magazine's list of the 500 Greatest Films of All Time.

On the review aggregator website Rotten Tomatoes, 96% of 51 critics' reviews are positive, with an average rating of 9.2/10. The website's consensus reads: "As effortlessly engaging as it is widely influential, Yojimbo represents Kurosawa at the peak of his powers -- and lays the groundwork for the modern American western." Metacritic, which uses a weighted average, assigned the film a score of 93 out of 100, based on 16 critics, indicating "universal acclaim".

== Sequel ==
In 1962, Kurosawa directed Sanjuro, originally intended to be a straight adaptation of Shūgorō Yamamoto's short story Hibi Heian (日日平安; lit. "Peaceful Days"), but was reworked to include Mifune and his character following the success of Yojimbo.

In both films, he takes his surname from the plants he happens to be looking at when asked his name: in Yojimbo, it is the mulberry-trees that feed the town's silkworms, and in Sanjuro, it is camellia-bushes used to make tea.

== Legacy ==
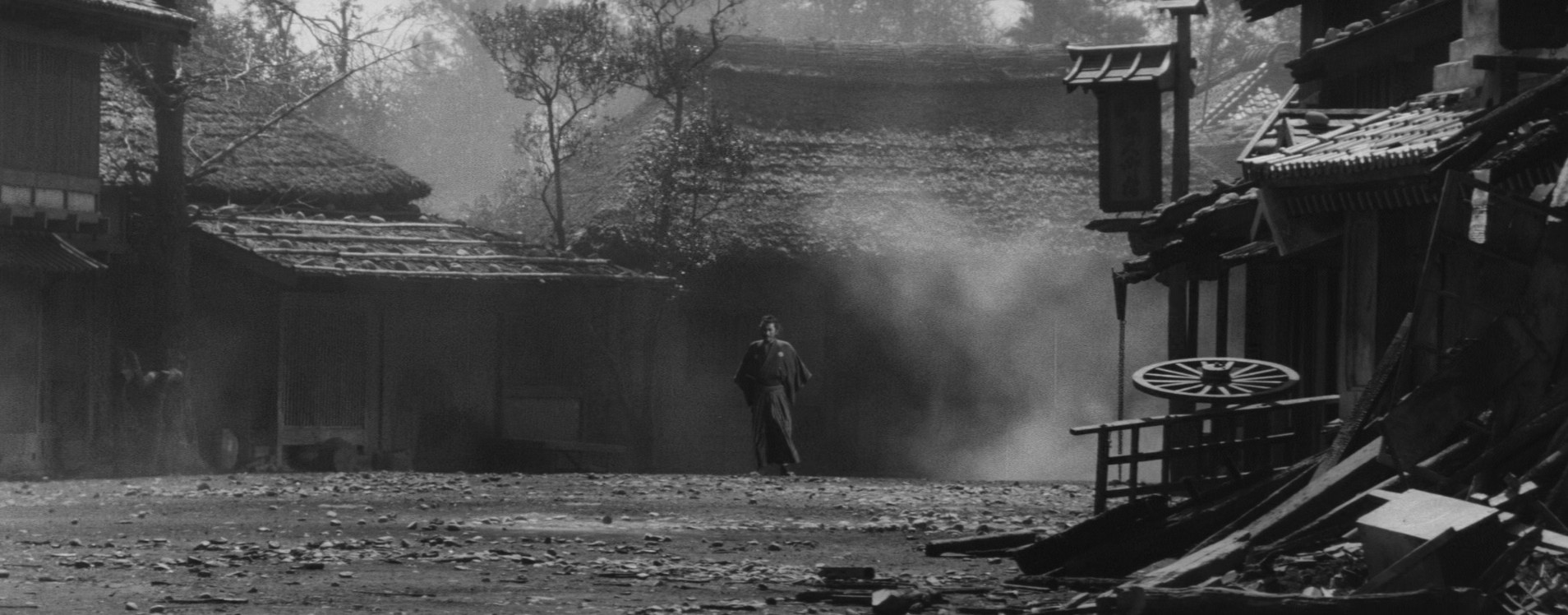
Western-influencing cinematography; Toshiro Mifune as a lone hero in wide framing.

Both in Japan and in the West, Yojimbo has influenced various forms of entertainment.

Yojimbo has been remade several times, starting with A Fistful of Dollars (1964), a Western directed by Sergio Leone and starring Clint Eastwood in his first appearance as the Man with No Name. Leone and his production company failed to secure the remake rights to Kurosawa's film, resulting in a lawsuit. It was settled out of court for an undisclosed agreement before the U.S. release. A second, looser western adaptation, Django (1966), was directed by Sergio Corbucci and featured Franco Nero in the title role. Other retellings include The Warrior and the Sorceress (1984), a sword and sorcery take, and Inferno (1999, aka Desert Heat). Last Man Standing (1996), a Prohibition-era action film directed by Walter Hill and starring Bruce Willis, is an official remake of Yojimbo: both Kikushima and Kurosawa specifically listed in this movie's credits as having provided the original story.

The film Zatoichi Meets Yojimbo (1970) features Mifune as a somewhat similar character. It is the twentieth of a series of movies featuring the blind swordsman Zatoichi. Although Mifune is clearly not playing the same "Yojimbo" as he did in the two Kurosawa films (his name is Sasa Daisaku 佐々大作, and his personality and background are different in many key respects), the movie's title and some of its content do intend to suggest the image of the two iconic jidaigeki characters confronting each other. Incident at Blood Pass (1970), made the same year, stars Mifune as a rōnin who looks and acts even more similarly to Sanjuro and is referred to simply as "Yojimbo" throughout the film, but whose name is Shinogi Tōzaburō. As was the case with Sanjuro, this character's surname of Shinogi (鎬) is not an actual proper family name, but rather a term that means "ridges on a blade".

Outside of remakes, several other films and other works have been inspired by the basic premise of an outsider joining a criminal group to defeat them from within. James Bond screenwriter Michael G. Wilson compared the story of Licence to Kill (1989) to Yojimbo, as both feature their leads "without any attacking of the villain or its cohorts, only sowing the seeds of distrust, he manages to have the villain bring himself down". Screenwriter Lawrence Kasdan stated that his inspiration for The Bodyguard (1992) was "Yojimbo with Steve McQueen as the lead." Nancy A. Collins's novel A Dozen Black Roses (1996), the fourth book in her series about vampire killer Sonja Blue, is a retelling of Yojimbo featuring warring vampire clans with Blue taking the role of protagonist. After the writers of season one of Barry (2018) discovered they had "kinda just did Yojimbo," they added an acknowledgement of the similarity in the show itself.

Other works that pay narrative and visual homage to Yojimbo include Star Wars Episode IV: A New Hope (1977), Star Wars: The Last Jedi (2017), Samurai Jack (2002) and Usagi Yojimbo.

Mifune's character became the model for John Belushi's Samurai Futaba character on Saturday Night Live. Roger Clark cited Yojimbo as an inspiration for his portrayal of Arthur Morgan in Red Dead Redemption 2.

== See also ==
- List of cult films
