= Shin Hakkenden =

1999 Japanese anime series

神八剣伝
- Genre: Adventure, Sci-fi, Post-apocalyptic
- Anime television series
- Directed by: Katsuyoshi Yatabe (Chief Director); Kazunori Tanahashi
- Written by: Yasushi Hirano
- Music by: Warlter Alen
- Studio: Public & Basic
- Original network: TV Tokyo
- English network: SEA: AXN-Asia
- Original run: April 3, 1999 – September 25, 1999
- Episodes: 26

Shin Hakkenden (神八剣伝, "legend of the eight divine swords") is a Japanese anime series. The anime is based on the epic novel Nansō Satomi Hakkenden (which also had an earlier OVA adaptation, The Hakkenden) except it is set in the future. Directed by Katsuyoshi Yatabe, the anime's 26 episodes were broadcast on TV Tokyo between April 3, 1999, and September 25, 1999.

== Story ==
The story begins on the year 2588, years after the "Earth" exploded from a meteor collision.

The planet once called "Earth" is on the brink of destruction due to the overflowing population and continuing environmental destruction. Queen Fuse prophesied an incoming meteor onto a collision course with "Earth", and all those who believed in her built the Yatsufusa, an imperial interstellar starship to accommodate all of Earth's humanity and escape.

With Queen Fuse's guidance, humanity prospered across the galaxy for million days and nights. They traveled until they came across a mysterious "center" with eight moons circling around its orbit. It was then the 100th Queen Fuse declared that this "center" be known as "Tenkai", their brand new world.

The Queen led her followers to the center to restore the Earth, but instead disrupted the universe's balance that could potentially trigger a cosmic obliteration. Believing the Queen to be at fault, all of humanity lost faith and never spoke of her again and decided to reside on the eight moons.

== Characters ==
Kou Yagami
The main protagonist with the "Air (宙)" orb in his sword.
Rooty Onmyou
A young girl as the series' narrator, later revealed to carry the "Bright (明)" orb in her ocarina.
Chuuji
A cyborg dog with the "Earth (地)" orb in his teeth.
Noboru Kongou
A young girl of a resistance guerillas with the "Metal (鋼)" orb in her knife.
Gyou Enjou
A vengeful ex-cop with the "Flame (炎)" orb in his left eye socket.
Ray Yozora
A mysterious androgynous youth with the "Shadow (影)" orb in her gun.
Tomoka Taiga
A gambler with the "Water (水)" orb in his dice.
Jinrai Hazuki
One of the resistance guerillas with the "Tree (樹)" orb in his shield.

== Anime ==
The anime uses three pieces of theme music; one opening theme and two ending themes. "Memories" by Angela is the series' opening theme. "Kitto Onaji Hoshi no Naka de" (きっと同じ星の中で) by Friend of mine is the series' ending theme from the first to the thirteenth episode. "Atarashii Hibi Shin Hakkenden Special Mix" (あたらしい日々神八剣伝スペシャルミックス) by RIZCO is the series' ending theme from the thirteenth to the twenty-sixth episode.

=== List of Episodes ===
1. Kou wails out (コウ、号泣する)
2. Chuji and Kou gathers (チュウジ、コウを拾う)
3. Noburu and Kou beaten (ノブル、コウを殴る)
4. Kou learns his destiny (コウ、運命を知る)
5. Kou is arrested (コウ、逮捕される)
6. Gyo and Kou are attacked (ギョウ、コウを襲う)
7. Tomoka infiltrates (トモカ、侵入する)
8. Kou is trapped (コウ、罠にはまる)
9. Rei approaches Kou (レイ、コウに接近する)
10. Kou investigates (コウ、調べられる)
11. Gyo accomplishes revenge (ギョウ、復讐を遂げる)
12. Kou and the others are targeted (コウたち、狙われる)
13. Rei and the fallen star (レイ、星を砕く)
14. Kou and Kai faces off (コウ、カイと対する)
15. Jinrai is disliked (ジンライ、嫌われる)
16. Tomoka victorious (トモカ、大勝負する)
17. Kou and the others escape (コウたち、脱出する)
18. Kou and the others, Searching for Mother (コウたち、ハハを捜す)
19. Ruty rages (ルーティ、怒る)
20. Kou and the others, Into the Past (コウたち、過去へ走る)
21. Kou learns the past (コウ、過去を知る)
22. Kou and the others ascend (コウたち、天へ翔ぶ)
23. Noburu forgives Jinrai (ノブル、ジンライを許す)
24. Chuji, Fuse's Call (チュウジ、フセへ誘う)
25. Kou and the others protect Fuse (コウたち、フセを護る
26. Ruty creates tomorrow (ルーティ、明日を創る)
