= The Hakkenden =

1993 OVA (original video animation) series

THE 八犬伝 (Za Hakkenden)
- Genre: Jidaigeki, Supernatural
- Original video animation
- Directed by: Takashi Anno
- Produced by: Yasuo Hasegawa; Tooru Miura
- Written by: Noboru Aikawa
- Music by: Takashi Kudō
- Studio: AIC
- Licensed by: NA: Geneon
- Released: October 25, 1990 – March 25, 1991
- Runtime: 30 minutes (each)
- Episodes: 6
- Original video animation

A New Saga
- Directed by: Yukio Okamoto
- Produced by: Yasuo Hasegawa; Kazuaki Morijiri
- Written by: Hidemi Kamata
- Music by: Takashi Kudō
- Studio: AIC
- Licensed by: NA: Geneon
- Released: November 25, 1993 – March 25, 1995
- Runtime: 30 minutes (each)
- Episodes: 7
- Related works
- Nansō Satomi Hakkenden (1814 novel series); Hakkenden: Eight Dogs of the East (2005 manga series / 2013 anime series)

The Hakkenden (THE 八犬伝, Za Hakkenden), also known as The Legend of the Dog Warriors: The Hakkenden, is an OVA series by AIC in two sequences, the second subtitled The Hakkenden: A New Saga (THE 八犬伝 新章, Za Hakkenden Shinshō). The anime is based on the epic novel Nansō Satomi Hakkenden written by Kyokutei Bakin during the latter half of the Edo period. At 106 volumes, the novel bears the distinction of being the longest novel in classic Japanese literature.

The Hakkenden is most known for its unique approach to animation, switching between several distinct visual styles throughout the duration of the series (sometimes even several times within the same episode). In addition, the series is also noted for its heavy use of symbolic imagery and themes, allowing the series to straddle the line between animation and art.

It is also known for introducing a modern perspective to a literary classic, since outdated, morally ambiguous concepts such as feudal loyalty and devotion are closely scrutinized and re-examined during many of the conflicts in the story. "The" at the front of the title is not a formality of translation, but a part of the title written in English, perhaps chosen by the series' writers to deliberately convey that sense of modernity.

== Story ==
=== Overview ===
The story takes place during the beginning of the Sengoku Jidai in Awa, a tiny province that is currently a part of modern-day Chiba Prefecture. Fuse, princess of the Awa-based Satomi clan, spiritually gives birth to eight warriors who are scattered across different areas of the region. Because the spiritual father of these warriors was a demonically possessed dog, these warriors came to be known as the Hakkenshi (八犬士), with hak (八), or hachi, meaning "eight", the ken (犬) meaning "dog", and the shi (士) meaning "warrior". (The word "den" (伝) at the end of the title means "legend", so the title of the series can be translated as "The Legend of the Eight Dogs".)

Throughout the series, each dog warrior recognizes the other through three distinguishing features: a family name starting with the word "inu" (meaning dog), a birthmark in the shape of a peony (the emblem of the Satomi clan) and a bead containing a kanji character that reflects eight of the fundamental virtues of Confucianism. They are:

- kō (孝) – filial piety; devotion
- gi (義) – duty and obligation, but it can also be translated as righteousness
- chū (忠) – loyalty
- shin (信) – faith
- tei (悌) – brotherhood; brotherly affection
- jin (仁) – sympathy and benevolence, but note that, according to Confucianism, "jin" is also the greatest and most perfect virtue of all. It should come as no surprise that the bearer of this bead also happens to be the most powerful warrior of the eight.
- chi (知) – wisdom
- rei (礼) – courtesy, but this can also be translated as proper form, i.e. an extensive knowledge and proper observation of tradition and manners

Note that this is the order in which the beads appear in the story. The hierarchy of these virtues in order of importance to Confucian philosophy are: jin, gi, rei, chi, chū, shin, kō, tei.

Plotwise, the series can be divided into three parts: the Prologue, the Search, and the Resolution. The Prologue presents events that occur before the birth of the dog warriors and encompasses the majority of episode 1, although numerous Prologue events are also shown throughout the series in flashback. The Search consists of the episodes prior to the warriors' final assembly (episodes 2–11), and the Resolution shows the final climactic battle fought by the Hakkenshi in the name of the Satomi clan.

== Characters ==
=== The Hakkenshi ===
Throughout the novel, the Hakkenshi undergo numerous changes in class, location, and status, which would often result in a name change. Because of the abridged nature of the OVA series, two characters in particular underwent name changes with little explanation for those unfamiliar with the novel.

Note: each warrior's "given name" contains the kanji character on their corresponding bead. In Shino's case, for instance, the kanji for "taka" in "Moritaka" is also the "kō" on his bead.

- Inuzuka Shino Moritaka (犬塚 信乃 戍孝): Toshihiko Seki (Japanese), Ken Kramer (English)- Bears the "kō" bead of filial piety; his birthmark is on his right arm. His father bore the responsibility of returning the Murasame sword to the Ashikaga Shogun, but before doing so, committed seppuku in protest of the local feudal lord, thereby transferring the heavy responsibility onto Shino's shoulders.
- Inukawa Sōsuke Yoshitō (犬川 荘助 義任) : Kappei Yamaguchi (Japanese), Matt Hill (English), Kelly Sheridan (English, young)- Bears the "gi" bead of duty; his birthmark is on his left arm. At the age of 7, his father was forced to commit seppuku after criticizing the Ashikaga Shogun, and his mother perished from the cold winter during the resulting pilgrimage from Izu. This left him under the cruel parentage of Hikiroku and Kamezasa, who gave him the undignified name of "Gakuzo" and forced him into indentured servitude to pay back the debt of his mother's funeral.
- Inuyama Dōsetsu Tadatomo (犬山 道節 忠與): Koichi Yamadera (Japanese), Michael Dobson (English) – Bears the "chū" bead of loyalty; his birthmark is on his left shoulder. His father was killed by rival lord Uesugi Sadamasa, making him hell-bent on revenge for the sake of his clan. In addition, he is Hamaji's half-brother. His mother was assassinated by Hamaji's biological mother (his father's second concubine), who became jealous due to her inability to bear a male heir. Particularly during the beginning of the series, Dōsetsu is ruthless, selfish, and a reckless loose cannon in the group.
- Inukai Genpachi Nobumichi (犬飼 現八 信道): Tomohiro Nishimura (Japanese), Ward Perry (English) – Bears the "shin" bead of faith; his birthmark is on his left cheek, underneath his left eye. The stereotypical "crazed enforcer" of the group, he is introduced as an inmate in the Shogun's prison, most likely jailed for his uncontrollable behavior (or perhaps just his sharp tongue). He is allowed a chance to win back his original post if he is successful in killing Shino. Compared to the plot exposition of most of the other major characters, not much of his origin is revealed or even implied during the series.
- Inuta Kobungo Yasuyori (犬田 小文吾 悌順): Tesshō Genda (Japanese), Paul Dobson (English) – Bears the "tei" bead of brotherhood. Kobungo has been friends with Genpachi for several years prior. He is of large stature, but silent demeanor – a stark contrast from his darker past, when he would succumb to fits of alcohol-induced rage and random violence. His father's death was the unfortunate result of just such a brawl, causing his nature to become passive and non-confrontational.
- Inue Shimbei Masashi (犬江 親兵衛 仁)): Noriko Hidaka (Japanese), Cathy Weseluck (English) – Bears the "jin" bead of benevolence. He is Kobungo's nephew, and was originally known as Inue Daihachi. Following the skirmish at the Shogun's palace, Shino is given refuge at Kobungo's inn, but Kobungo's brother-in-law (Daihachi's father) offers to turn Shino over to the authorities in return for a reward that would help keep his family afloat. Kobungo refuses to sacrifice Shino, and a fight ensues, resulting in the deaths of Daihachi's parents. Kobungo takes it upon himself to raise the child along with Genpachi and Shino, but sometime after the group temporarily splits up, a vision of Princess Fuse and Yatsufusa appears. Telling Kobungo that the child will be safe under their care, he willingly hands Daihachi over to be raised in an otherworldly realm. Some time later, the child returns, fully grown, extremely powerful, and with the new name of Inue Shimbei.
- Inuzaka Keno Tanetomo (犬阪 毛野 胤智): Minami Takayama (Japanese), Janyse Jaud (English)- Bears the "chi" bead of wisdom. When he was a child, a local feudal lord murdered Keno's father in an attempt to obtain the two legendary flutes in his possession, but was only able to find one of them after the incident. The other had been presumed lost. Since then, Keno has sought to regain both flutes and has also plotted an elaborate revenge against the family that killed his father. He is a celebrated flautist and dancer, but is disguised as a female under the pseudonym of "Asakeno", which is most likely a means of evading suspicion of his ultimate intent.
- Inumura Daikaku Masanori (犬村 大角 礼儀): Akio Otsuka (Japanese), David Kaye (English)- Bears the "rei" bead of courtesy; his birthmark is on his buttocks, much to his embarrassment. He is first introduced in the story as Kakutarō, son of Akaiwa Ikkaku, a talented swordsman who, unbeknownst to everyone in the village, was demonically possessed by an evil cat spirit many years ago. Kakutarō's wife Hinaginu was given the "rei" bead as a keepsake memento, but swallowed it down when Kakutarō's stepmother demanded that she relinquish it. Since that incident, Hinaginu's stomach bulged, as if pregnant, sparking talk of an affair with another man. When confronted by Akaiwa about her "unborn child", she mortally stabbed herself in the stomach with a knife to prove to everyone that she wasn't pregnant. Meanwhile, the cat spirit's possession of Akaiwa had advanced rapidly, forcing Kakutarō to execute his own father. With no one else left in his life, he renames himself Daikaku and joins the others.

== Episode list ==
=== Part 1 ===
No.	Title	Original release date (Note: Episodes were released immediately on video in two pairs.)
1	"The Kaleidoscope (万華鏡)"	October 25, 1990
2	"Dark Music of the Gods (闇神楽)"	October 25, 1990
3	"The Futility Dance (婆娑羅舞)"	December 25, 1990
4	"Horyu Tower (芳琉閣)"	December 25, 1990
5	"Demon's Melody (夜叉囃子)"	March 25, 1991
6	"The Cicada Spirit Cry (鬼哭蝉)"	March 25, 1991

=== Part 2 ===
No.	Title	Original release date
7	"Spirits (妖霊)"	November 25, 1993
8	"Taigyuryo Hall (対牛楼)"	January 25, 1994
9	"The Legend of the Ghost Cat (妖猫譚)"	April 10, 1994
10	"Hamaji's Resurrection (浜路再臨)"	July 10, 1994
11	"Dog Warriors in the Netherworld (犬士冥合)"	September 10, 1994
12	"Aspirations of Paradise (欣求浄土)"	November 10, 1994
13	"Taking Leave of a Sullied World (厭離穢土)"	March 25, 1995

== Home Media Release ==
=== Japanese ===
On November 25, 1998, the first series was released on DVD.

On January 26, 2005, the first series was re-released on DVD while the second series was released the same day on a separate DVD.

On June 27, 2012, a DVD of the entire series was released by Genon in Japan.

=== International ===
Originally, the series was released in English on 7 Laser Discs from August 1995 to July 30, 1996.

LaserDisc Number	Release Date
LD 1	August 1, 1995
LD 2	October 3, 1995
LD 3	December 5, 1995
LD 4	January 30, 1996
LD 5	March 26, 1996
LD 6	May 28, 1996
LD 7	July 30, 1996

On October 9, 2001, Genon [Pioneer] released the series on DVD in English with both subtitles and dub.

In 2007, Genon released 3 DVDs with Japanese and English audio and English subtitles.

Volume	Release Date	Episodes Included
DVD 1	June 5, 2007	1–5
DVD 2	August 7, 2007	6–9
DVD 3	October 9, 2007	10–13

== See also ==
- Nansō Satomi Hakkenden
