= Four Cardinal Principles and Eight Virtues =

Chinese moral principles

- Traditional Chinese: 四維八德
Transcriptions
Standard Mandarin
- Hanyu Pinyin: Sìwéi Bādé
- Wade–Giles: Ssu wei pa te
Yue: Cantonese
- Yale Romanization: Sei wàih baat dāk
- Jyutping: Sei3 wai4 baat3 dak1

The Four Cardinal Principles and Eight Virtues are a set of Legalist (and later Confucian) foundational principles of morality. The Four Cardinal Principles are propriety (禮), righteousness (義), integrity (廉), and shame (恥). The Eight Virtues are loyalty (忠), filial piety (孝), benevolence (仁), love (愛), honesty (信), justice (義), harmony (和), and peace (平).

== Four Cardinal Principles ==
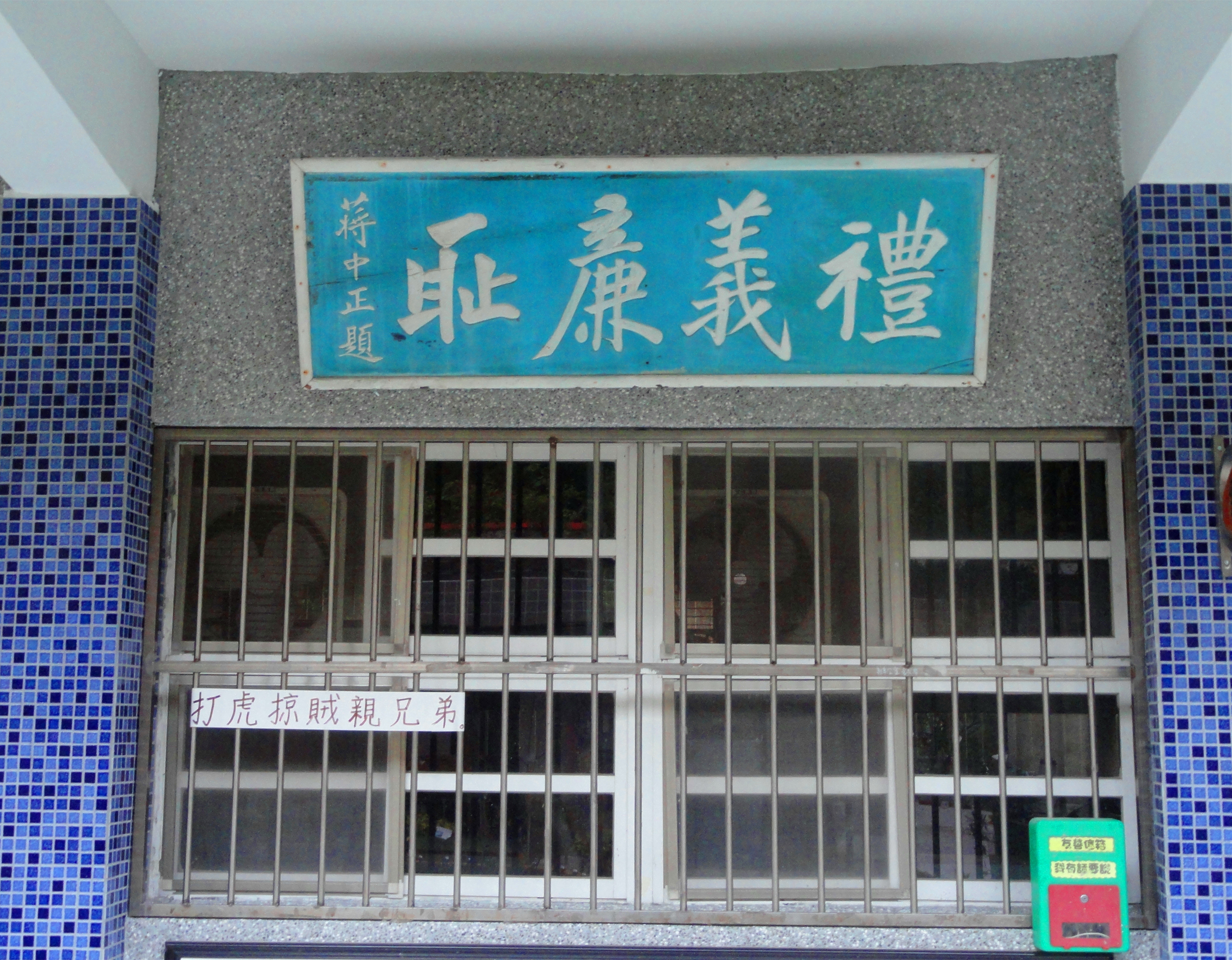
The Four Principles of Chinese Morality. This shows the alternate 4th principle of 'honour'.

Four Cardinal Principles
- Traditional Chinese: 禮、義、廉、恥
Transcriptions
Standard Mandarin
- Hanyu Pinyin: Lǐ, yì, lián, chǐ
- Wade–Giles: Li i lien ch`ih
Yue: Cantonese
- Yale Romanization: Láih, yih, lìhm, chí
- Jyutping: Lai5, ji6, lim4, ci2

The Four Cardinal Principles are also referred to as the fundamental principles of conduct, or four social bonds. They are derived from the Legalist text Guanzi, attributed to the Qi philosopher Guan Zhong, although it is unlikely he was the actual author. The Four Cardinal Principles can be understood as the following:

- Lǐ (禮) - the rites, ritual; originally referring to the major Confucian duties, such as ancestor worship and issues of appropriate behaviour between generations. The concept was later expanded to all manner of ritualised cultural life. Within the Confucian tradition, the purpose of ritual was to engage in a continuous process of applying appropriate behaviours, taking the correct frame of mind when doing so, as a way to shape one's thinking and reinforce moral character.
- Yì (義) - righteousness; refers to both correct conduct, and the rejection of improper behaviour and dishonour. The concept is also heavily intertwined with Confucian ideas of filial piety and the correct social order.
- Lián (廉) - integrity; refers to always being 'upright' in one's behaviour.
- Chǐ (恥) - shame; refers to the appropriate response one should feel towards inappropriate behaviour; it is considered one of the means by which individuals judge right from wrong. Within the Legalist Confucian tradition, "shame" was considered the more effective means of controlling the behaviour of the population, as opposed to punishment, as it allowed individuals to recognise their transgression and engage in self-improvement.

In a speech in 1934, Generalissimo Chiang Kai-shek invoked the importance of the four principles as a guide for the New Life Movement. The movement was an attempt to reintroduce Confucian principles into everyday life in China as a means to create national unity and act as a bulwark against communism.

The four pockets on a Sun Yat-sen-style suit jacket are said to represent these four principles.

== Eight Virtues ==
Eight Virtues
- Traditional Chinese: 忠、孝、仁、愛、信、義、和、平
Transcriptions
Standard Mandarin
- Hanyu Pinyin: Zhōng, xiào, rén, ài, xìn, yì, hé, píng
- Wade–Giles: Chung, hsiao, jen, ai, hsin, i, ho, p`ing
Yue: Cantonese
- Yale Romanization: Jūng, haau, yàhn, ngoi, seun, yih, wòh, pèhng
- Jyutping: Zung1, haau3, jan4, ngoi3, soen3, ji6, wo4 ping4

The Eight Virtues were taken from a speech made by the late Chinese Nationalist statesman Dr Sun Yat-sen, founding president of the ROC, as he was outlining his Three Principles of the People.

Chinese original	English translation
講到中國固有的道德，中國人至今不能忘記的，首是忠孝，次是仁愛，其次是信義，其次是和平。這些舊道德，中國人至今還是常講的。但是現在受外來民族的壓迫，侵入了新文化，那些新文化的勢力，此刻橫行中國，一般醉心新文化的人，便排斥舊道德，以為有了新文化，便可以不要舊道德。不知道我們固有的東西，如果是好的，當然是要保存，不好的才可以放棄。此刻中國正是新舊潮流相衝突的時候，一般國民都無所適從。	"What are China's time-honored virtues? Loyalty and filial piety come first. Then we have love, faithfulness, and love of peace. Some who crave the new form of civilization want to throw away these virtues. They say that these old relics have no place in modern civilization. They are wrong, however; because China can ill afford to lose these previous virtues."

The influence of the Eight Virtues is particularly obvious in Taiwan, where many major streets in larger cities are named for them.

== See also ==
- Three Fundamental Bonds and Five Constant Virtues
- Politics of the Republic of China
- Three Principles of the People
