= Hakkenden: Eight Dogs of the East =

Japanese manga series

- Cover of the first manga volume

八犬伝 ―東方八犬異聞― (Hakkenden: Tōhō Hakken Ibun)
- Manga
- Written by: Miyuki Abe
- Published by: Kadokawa Shoten
- Magazine: Ichi*Raki (2005–2011); Asuka Ciel (2011–2014); Emerald (2014–2024)
- Original run: October 10, 2005 – August 2024
- Volumes: 22
- Anime television series
- Directed by: Osamu Yamasaki (Chief); Mitsue Yamazaki
- Produced by: Keiichi Matsuda; Hiroko Kuwazono; Kozue Kaneniwa; Yukie Iwashita; Takashi Iwasaki; Masakatsu Ōmuro; Natsuki Uetake
- Written by: Osamu Yamasaki; Mitsue Yamazaki
- Music by: Hitomi Kuroishi
- Studio: Studio Deen
- Licensed by: AUS: Hanabee; NA: Sentai Filmworks
- Original network: MBS, Tokyo MX, BS11 Digital, TV Aichi
- Original run: January 5, 2013 – March 30, 2013
- Episodes: 13
- Anime television series

Hakkenden: Eight Dogs of the East 2
- Directed by: Osamu Yamasaki (Chief); Mitsue Yamazaki
- Produced by: Keiichi Matsuda; Hiroko Kuwazono; Kozue Kaneniwa; Yukie Iwashita; Takashi Iwasaki; Masakatsu Ōmuro; Natsuki Uetake
- Written by: Osamu Yamasaki; Mitsue Yamazaki
- Music by: Hitomi Kuroishi
- Studio: Studio Deen
- Licensed by: AUS: Hanabee; NA: Sentai Filmworks
- Original network: Tokyo MX, BS11 Digital
- Original run: July 8, 2013 – September 29, 2013
- Episodes: 13
- Related works
- Nansō Satomi Hakkenden (1814 novel series); The Hakkenden (1990 OVA series)
- icon

Hakkenden: Eight Dogs of the East (八犬伝 ―東方八犬異聞―, Hakkenden: Tōhō Hakken Ibun) is a Japanese manga series by Miyuki Abe based on the epic novel series Nansō Satomi Hakkenden. An anime adaptation of the manga, produced by Studio Deen, premiered on January 5, 2013. A second season premiered in the summer of 2013.

== Plot ==
Five years prior to the start of the story the residents of Ōtsuka village all died in a plague, with only three survivors; childhood friends Shino Inuzuka, Sosuke Inukawa and a young girl named Hamaji. They take shelter in a church near another village, whose people view the survivors with suspicion. Now the Imperial Church comes in search of "Murasame," the demon blade containing "life" which Shino possesses within his body. When the Church realizes that Shino will not come quietly with them, Hamaji is kidnapped, which results in Shino and Sosuke traveling to the Imperial City to rescue her. There they encounter Satomi Rio, a Dean of the Church, who tells Shino he must find the other six bead holders.

== Characters ==
=== The bead holders ===
There are eight bead holders all together, representing the eight young men who appeared with Princess Fuse to fight Tama-Azusa in "the time of darkness". Shino and Sosuke have been charged with gathering together the bead holders for some reason by Rio. So far all the bead holders have five things in common: they all have a bead, a peony mark somewhere on their bodies, "Inu" at the beginning of their last names, they have all died and come back to life, and they all have a guardian or ability that is keeping them alive.

Shino Inuzuka (犬塚 信乃)
Voiced by: Tetsuya Kakihara (Japanese); Greg Ayres (English)
An 18-year-old boy who is the holder of the "Devotion" (孝) bead. Nicknamed 'Shii' by Kaname, he is one of the three survivors of the destruction of Ōtsuka Village. He holds the living sword Murasame in his right arm, along with a peony birthmark. Because of a curse set by harboring Murasame within his body, he is still in his 13-year-old state. Five years before the start of the story, Shino was a very weak and ill child who was made to dress and act like a girl by his parents because they heard doing so would help him grow. Young Shino was told that he would not live into adulthood. He still openly welcomed Sosuke and Hamaji into his home and treated the two abandoned children as brother and sister. Shino even commented that he and Sosuke are brothers when he sees Sosuke's peony mark. Though mentally 18, he does tend to act like his status age, something Sosuke is constantly teasing and lecturing him about. He often has outbursts of emotion, is very energetic and loud yet has a very kind, naïve, and loving nature. Because of this many people are attracted to him, including spirits and humans. He easily makes friends with many people, is usually straight forward, talking or taking action without thinking, which typically concludes with a scolding from Sosuke. He seems quite perplexed by the fact that Genpachi has shown a romantic interest in him, again pointing to his age and naivety. He cares deeply for those around him, to such an extent that he forced Sosuke to continue living after they were fatally injured five years ago. Although his exterior personality is happy and optimistic, he reveals himself to be quite burdened and knowledgeable of the events taking place around him; this is often seen when his thoughts travel to his immortality. He is shown to have a deep fear of the possibility of living alone one day. Shino loves meat, and he is petrified of the living dead and insects, and is usually seen running away or clinging to Sosuke in fear when either appear. Despite his phobias, when he needs to fight he shows great bravery and is calmer, especially with Murasame in hand. Shino often wears a red and white long coat with the church insignia on the back and has short purple hair and greenish yellow eyes. He is revealed to be the younger half brother of Satomi Rio.

Sōsuke Inukawa (犬川 荘介)
Voiced by: Satoshi Hino (Japanese); Leraldo Anzaldua (English)
The holder of the Duty (義) bead. He is another of the three survivors, along with Shino and Hamaji. He can shape shift into the dog Yoshiro, who had been Shino's loyal pet, and has a peony mark on the back of his neck. He treats Shino and Hamaji like family, as he does not have any relatives. He is very strict on safety and tends to be the calm and composed one to Shino's brash and compulsive behavior. He is also very protective of Shino and often volunteers to pay the prices for his deeds, as seen when he was willing to pay the price of having his arm cut off in order to protect Shino when he trespassed into Chikage's house. He is constantly by Shino's side and tends to spend half his time bailing him out of trouble. A mysterious man who looks identical to him, Ao (who was referred to as Sosuke's 'shadow' by Murasame) is said to be the other half of Sosuke's soul. He has a very kind and gentle personality, and is a very hard worker. He would not hesitate even to kill someone if it were for Shino's benefit. When he was a child, Mayor Inuzuka of Otsuka, Shino's father, found him and his mother collapsed by the road. They were taken in, but his mother died, and he lost all his memories of what happened before then. Sosuke dresses in black attire that is similar to a school uniform and has short black hair and blue eyes. In episode 24, he lost his sense of pain, use of his left hand and sight in his left eye, and is in a comatose state. In Episode 13 of season 2, he wakes out of his coma due to Shino's wish for the bead to choose him again.

Genpachi Inukai (犬飼 現八)
Voiced by: Tomoaki Maeno (Japanese); Andrew Love (English)
Holder of the Faith (信) bead. He is a captain of the Imperial Military Police. Three years ago, he and his foster brother, Kobungo, were sent on assignment to the north and were attacked by demons. As a result of the incident, he can turn into a lightning demon that devours supernatural beings. He and Kobungo's sister Nui were lovers before he left and she had committed suicide when he returned because she was pregnant by another man. This caused much grief to Genpachi and, as a result, he tried to commit suicide as well. However, he failed each and every time due to his now-demonic body. He has a peony mark on his right cheek. He has feelings for Shino because he believes Shino is someone that won't die easily unlike Nui, and he doesn't care if Shino is male. Genpachi is a quiet person who often seems to give very little care to details. As a Captain of the Imperial Military Police, Genpachi is seen to take his work very seriously. He demonstrate an ability to keep his thoughts and emotions in check which allows him to be very efficient at his job.

Kobungo Inuta (犬田 小文吾)
Voiced by: Takuma Terashima (Japanese); Mark Laskowski (English)
Holder of the Brotherhood (悌) bead. He works at an inn owned by his family. He was a foot soldier who accompanied Genpachi on a mission in a Northern village. The mission took a turn for the worse when he and Genpachi were attacked by man-eating demons, but he found after the incident that he could transform into a wind demon at will. Like Genpachi, his wounds heal very easily. He has a peony mark on his lower back. Kobungo is a very excitable person, which is shown when Genpachi says that Shino is "his type". He is also very stubborn and cares deeply for those around him, constantly trying to get Genpachi out of confinement.

Keno Inusaka (犬阪 毛野)
Voiced by: Junichi Miyake (Japanese); Illich Guardiola (season 1), Ian Sinclair (season 2) (English)
Holder of the Wisdom (智) bead. A traveling dancer who accompanies Kokonoe. Two years before the start of the series, Ao destroyed his village, killed his family, and carved out his heart, but Keno had refused to die, a fact that fascinated the demon princess Kokonoe. When he first met Sosuke, he attacked him, thinking he was the person who attacked his village. He is feminine in appearance, but is an adept swordsman, and is quite strong. He has a peony mark on his chest. He possesses a sword named Osaza, which his father entrusted to him.

Dōsetsu Inuyama (犬山 道節)
Voiced by: Shinichiro Miki (Japanese); Houston Hayes (English)
Holder of the Loyalty (忠) Bead. A man who was saved from freezing to death by the snow spirit, Yukihime, He is searching for his long lost sister, Mutsuki, who was separated from him when they were both young about ten years after their parents had died. He has a peony mark. He first met Shino and Sousuke on the train when he was searching for his sister, where Shino recognized Yukihime. He tends to be freaked out over anything supernatural like Murasame coming out of Shino's arm, and is often told by the other characters that he has the worst luck. When he and Mutsuki were separated, he promised her to come back and find her eventually, and she gave him her hair pin. Dosetsu has purple hair because of a medicine he used to take when he was a child, meant to help him develop an immunity to various drugs. He is often seen wearing a tan trench coat and glasses.

Daikaku Inumura (犬村 大角)
Voiced by: Kenjiro Tsuda (Japanese); Mike Yager (English)
Holder of the Etiquette (礼) bead. The adopted son of a doll maker; he was given to his current family by his real father, who was looking for an easy way to get money by selling his son in return for dolls he could sell. Daikaku is also a doll maker and wished to follow in his adopted father's footsteps, even when he admits that he will never be as good as his adopted father. After his adopted father had died, his real father had come looking for him so that he could make more dolls to sell, and when Daikaku refused, his father killed him. Daikaku was saved by Noro, his deceased pet cat that had come back to protect him as a spirit. It is later revealed that Noro had also put up a spirit barrier to keep the now tainted spirit of Daikaku's adopted father from entering. He has a younger sister named Hinaginu. He eventually receives a third eye on his forehead that sees and exterminates spirits, which was a gift from his late cat, Noro.

Shinobu Inue (犬江 仁)
Voiced by: Tsubasa Yonaga (Japanese); Luci Christian (English)
Holder of the Benevolence (仁) bead. A young boy around 12 years of age. When he was 6, his mother attempted to kill him, but he was saved by Kagetsu, a Tengu who later took care of him and eventually entrusted half of his life to the boy. After 10 years, he was found by Chudai, who then left him under his grandmother's care. Because he spent 10 years as a Tengu child, he stopped aging until his rescue by Chudai, making him chronologically 22 years old. He meets Shino and Sosuke during their investigation of a spirit child's sudden return, and is later taken back by Kagetsu's brother Hazuki. It is also revealed by Hazuki that Shinobu is actually Kagetsu's son, making him half Tengu. During Ao's attack on their home, Shinobu discovers his bead, which had been hidden in his body by Kagetsu. Sent away to safety by Hazuki after healing the boy with half of his life, Shinobu eventually learns to use his Tengu wings to help Shino put out a forest fire. Afterwards, he decides to join Shino and Sosuke on their way back to the Imperial Capital. He has a peony mark on his left arm.

=== Four Sacred Beast Houses ===
The Four Sacred Beast Houses (四獣神家, Shijūshinka) are the fox, the wolf, the snake, and the panther. The wielders of the Sacred Beasts are very powerful and tend to be feared, which is why the Church chose to take them in; so that they could control them. The wielders also tend to be ostracized by their families, even being called disgraces, so they are usually alone except for each other. They live in a huge mansion, which they end up sharing with Shino and Sosuke.

Rio Satomi (里見 莉芳)
Voiced by: Hiroshi Kamiya (Japanese); David Matranga (English)
One of the members of the "Four Sacred Beast Houses", he materializes his spirit in form of an Okami (a giant white wolf) named Yatsufusa. He is the one who saved Shino, Sosuke, and Hamaji during the destruction of Ōtsuka Village. He asks Sosuke and Shino to find the other bead holders for an unknown purpose. Rio volunteered to be Shino's guardian. It was hinted that he is related to Shino, later revealed to be Shino's older half brother. It is also hinted that he may have known Shino before the incident and was the one who gave Murasame to Shino in order to save his life.

Kaname Osaki (尾崎 要)
Voiced by: Daisuke Namikawa (Japanese); Blake Shepard (English)
One of the members of the "Four Sacred Beast Houses", he is capable of summoning five foxes to use them as servants or fighters. He seems to have feelings for Hamaji, as in episode 4, he told his older brother that he didn't care about his family, or about what his brother did, but that by injuring Hamaji's face he had crossed the line. He is constantly teasing Rio and was the one who gave Shino his nickname. He was cast out of his family for being a 'disgrace' after he was discovered to be the wielder of the fox spirits.

Ayane Mizuki (観月 あやね)
Voiced by: Satomi Akesaka (Japanese); Brittney Karbowski (English)
One of the members of the "Four Sacred Beast Houses", she summons her guardian spirit in the form of giant snake named Chikage. She becomes friends with Hamaji. She is physically very weak and because of that only her connection with Chikage is keeping her alive, which results in Chikage being extremely protective of her. However, since Chikage is the size of a 'guardian god' now he can not leave the house, which limits Ayane's movements as well. It was later realized that Ayane could use Kaname's foxes to travel, however.

Nachi Hinozuka (緋ノ塚 那智)
Voiced by: Keiji Fujiwara (Japanese); David Wald (English)
One of the members of the "Four Sacred Beast Houses", he is capable of summoning a large black panther called Kaede. He tends to have a laid back personality, but can be serious when he wants to. He seems to be privy to Rio's secrets and tends to act in the shadows, and takes his time on when on missions. Kaede doesn't like the House too much, saying it's much too crowded with all the other Beasts there.

=== Familiars ===
Murasame (村雨)
Voiced by: Nobuhiko Okamoto (Japanese); Greg Ayres (English)
Murasame is the living sword spirit, rumored to have sway over anything regardless of shape or form. It is said that whoever possess Murasame will meet a tragic end. The spirit can transform into a crow and can communicate in human language. Murasame sometimes sits on Shino's arm and likes to pick and eat dropped food, as well as Megu, which Shino has scolded him for. However, when in his true form or angry, Murasame becomes a blood-thirsty monster, resembling that of a dragon. He is also very obedient to Shino. Whenever Murasame is out, he has a tendency to accidentally crash into nearby barriers and break them. Although Murasame is often somewhat klutzy, it has been shown to have a serious, and more aggressive side to it, morphing into a gigantic dinosaur form when overprotective of Shino. It is sometimes shown to be watching Shino from a distance and has the ability to summon rain.

Kokonoe (九重)
Voiced by: Naomi Shindō (Japanese); Carli Mosier (English)
The demon princess that saved Keno from death after the destruction of his village and almost be killed by Ao, giving him her heart so that he could live.

Yukihime (雪姫)
Voiced by: Mamiko Noto (Japanese); Nancy Novotny (English)
The snow spirit that saved Dōsetsu from death at the cost of her voice and always accompanies him making everywhere around him cold, even during summer. She refers to Shino as her only true friend and constantly wards off other women Dosetsu gets close to with her powers.

Noro (野驢)
Voiced by: Megumi Han (Japanese); Shannon Emerick (English)
Daikaku's late pet cat who hands down his cat's eye to him.

Kagetsu (華月)
Voiced by: Akira Ishida (Japanese); Eric Daughtery (English)
A Tengu who saved Shinobu from death. He is eventually revealed as Shinobu's biological father. He gave half of his life to Shinobu, and as a result died due to using his remaining powers.

Hazuki (葉月)
Voiced by: Masakazu Morita (Japanese); Ty Mahany (English)
Kagetsu's twin brother who only reluctantly accepted Shinobu's presence at first. He then retrieves Shinobu and tells him of Kagetsu's fate. After awakening Shinobu's powers by giving half of his life to the boy, he dies at Ao's hands and becomes a lifeless vessel for his plans.

Natsume (棗目)
Voiced by: Nozomu Sasaki (Japanese); Scotty Fults (English)
A dog-like beast and a close friend of Kagetsu and Hazuki, who becomes Shinobu's aide after they both die. After staying at Konaya, he takes a liking to kotatsu.

Yatsufusa (八房)
Rio's Inugami.

Five foxes (五狐, Goko)
- Voiced by: Akari Harashima (Japanese); Tiffany Grant (English) (Kinko (金狐))
- Voiced by: Miyu Katsui (Japanese); Tiffany Grant (English) (Ginko (銀狐))
- Voiced by: Sora Tokui (Japanese); Tiffany Grant (English) (Hyakko (白狐))
- Voiced by: Hiro Nakajima (Japanese); Tiffany Grant (English) (Kokuko (黒狐))
- Voiced by: Arisa Nishiguchi (Japanese); Tiffany Grant (English) (Tenko (天狐))
Kaname's identical foxes who serve as his maids. They can shapeshift into humans but remain the same size.

Chikage (ちかげ)
- Voiced by: Miho Arakawa (Japanese); Allison Sumrall (English)
Ayane's serpent who is overprotective of her to the point that Ayane obeys her.

Kaede (楓)
- Voiced by: Masaya Onosaka (Japanese); David Wald (English)
Nachi's panther who can change size. He is infatuated with Nachi and sometimes feels neglected with the other familiars around him.

=== Antagonists ===
Ao (蒼)
Voiced by: Satoshi Hino (Japanese); Leraldo Anzaldua (English)
Known as Sosuke's Shadow and said to be the other half of Sosuke's soul, not much is known about him other than the fact that he appears to be rather malicious and unpredictable and that he was given a body by Fusehime. He appears to possess Sosuke's missing childhood memories, a fact which he likes to remind Shino of. He was the one who killed Keno and took his heart and received a slash to his left eye in return. He also possesses the Ochiba sword, which is the sibling sword of Keno's Osaza sword, and claims in episode 17 that both swords were meant to be his, and that it was Keno's parents who had destroyed his village. He seems infatuated with Shino, even stating at one point that he would come for him, but that it was not yet time because the owners of the beads were not yet 'gathered'. This is supported by the fact that he took Kohaku's left eye after finding out that Shino liked her eyes, as well as the fact that he's been keeping tabs on Shino's life. Ao has the same face as Sosuke, and dresses in a dark shirt, light pants, and a green cloak. He has black hair and heterochromia, one blue one gold. He once lost his left eye so he stole that of Kohaku in exchange for cursing her life.

Tamazusa (玉梓)
Voiced by: Masako Katsuki (Japanese); Genevieve Simmons (English)
According to legend, Tamazusa was a princess who attempted to enter Japan with her two sons. The younger one left to join the government and was killed. Afterwards, her elder son committed suicide upon learning of his younger brother's demise. She was also the model Daikaku's adopted father hired for one of his larger dolls, recognized by Shino as the woman who once "killed" him. She reappears in episode 25, under the disguise of a nun, and working with Ao to gather all eight beads in order to bring her sons back. She is last seen escaping after Murasame goes on rampage and her whereabouts are unknown.

Finnegan (フェネガン, Fenegan)
- Voiced by: Akio Ohtsuka (Japanese); Carl Masterson (English)

Lilith (リリス, Ririsu)
- Voiced by: Youko Honna (Japanese); Shelley Calane-Black (English)

=== Others ===
Seiran (青蘭)
Voiced by: Noriaki Sugiyama (Japanese); Connor Leach (English)
A psychotic monk who attempts to kill Genpachi, because he believes that Genpachi's demon form is a threat to humans. He is Kaname's older brother and is killed by him in episode 4.

Hamaji (浜路)
Voiced by: Ayahi Takagaki (Japanese); Emily Neves (English)
A girl who survived the Ōtsuka Village incident. She is like a sister to Shino and Sosuke. She always obsesses over making sure that everyone is fed properly, although she is not a very good cook. She is manipulative towards the boys, but deep down she cares about them. She states in episode 9 that she wants to be a doctor so that she can help alleviate Shino's suffering as he cannot age. It is revealed that she is Dousetsu Inuyama's long lost sister, Mutsuki Inuyama (犬山睦月). She seems to have feelings for Kaname. She is also not easily disturbed, as shown when she was kidnapped by Osaki and remained unperturbed. In episode 9, she starts attending an all-girls boarding school.

Megu (メグ)
A black algae-like creature with an eyeball that Shino found in episode 1. When he becomes wet or eats too much, his size increases dramatically, making him useful in certain situations. Murasame constantly attempts to eat him, only to be scolded by Shino. He has been living in the Konna-ya ever since Shino and Sosuke's arrival at the Imperial Capital. He got his name from Genpachi after he took an interest in the creature. He also has a habit of chewing on anything he considers edible, such as Kaede's tails, only to be chided by either Kobungo or Kaede.

Suzu Kumagai (熊谷 鈴, Kumagai Suzu)
- Voiced by: Marie Miyake (Japanese); Margaret McDonald (English)
Hamaji's best friend and roommate at school. She actually revealed to be the "guardian" who watches over the boarding school and whose real appearance is a half teddy bear and half rabbit ("Rabbear"). Her human form has orange hair, peach colored skin, and yellow eyes.

Ruri Kobayakawa (小早川 るり, Kobayakawa Ruri)
- Voiced by: Sawa Ishige (Japanese); Allison Sumrall (English)
Known as "Ruri the perfect" is a popular student at Hamaji's boarding school.

Kenta (健太)
- Voiced by: Yuko Sanpei (Japanese); Kalin Coates (English)
Shino and Sousuke's rebellious neighbor who resides in the village part of town. He refers to Sosuke as "Bro-so".

Chudai (ゝ大)
- Voiced by: Binbin Takaoka (Japanese); Rob Mungle (English)
A monk who is obsessed with exterminating spirits. He is later revealed to be a father figure to Shinobu after saving him from Kagetsu.

Kohaku (琥珀)
- Voiced by: Junko Minagawa (Japanese); Molly Searcy (English)
A prostitute from the red light district who was raised as such as being taken away from her family. Ao grants her wish of extending her life at the cost of her left eye, which he wears, and in return gives her the ability to turn into a demon and devour others. She requests Shino to execute her to put an end to her suffering.

Kaho (佳穂)
- Voiced by: Fumiko Orikasa (Japanese); Margaret McDonald (English)
A blind little girl who goes to school along with a few other children at the local church. She enjoys Shino reading books for her despite not being able to see.

Yanahime (弥奈姫)
- Voiced by: Ami Koshimizu (Japanese); Caitlynn French (English)
A miko who was cursed by Ao after being desperate to see the outside world. After Yana is freed from her, she attends the same boarding school as Hamaji.

Akihiko Narumura (成村 章彦, Narumura Akihiko)
- Voiced by: Yuki Kaida (Japanese); Margaret McDonald (English)
One of Shinobu and Shino's classmates at Ikura Public School. Growing up as an only child of a working-class family, he lived with his physically ill mother Voiced by: Mie Sonozaki (Japanese); Tiffany Grant (English) and his mentally stressed father Voiced by: Hajime Iijima (Japanese); Ian Sinclair (English). Wanting to help his mother, he went to the mountains to pick bellflowers for her. However, he fell from the mountains and died in the flowerfields. After he died, the bellflowers gave Akihiko half-life for his desire, which was that he wanted to give flowers to his mother and see her one last time.

== Media ==
=== Anime ===
The anime premiered on MBS on January 5, 2013. The series is directed by Mitsue Yamazaki, with Osamu Yamazaki as Chief Director. The anime has been licensed by Sentai Filmworks in North America and by Hanabee in Australia & New Zealand. The series had been obtained by Crunchyroll for online streaming in North America. Season 2 began airing on July 7, 2013. The opening theme song for the first season is called "God FATE" and is performed by Faylan, while the ending theme song is called "String of pain" and is sung by Tetsuya Kakihara. For the second season, the opening theme song is called "wonder fang" by Faylan, while the ending theme is called "Soai Calendula" (奏愛カレンデュラ) by Ceui.

==== Episode list ====
===== Season 1 =====
| No. | Title | Original release date |
|---|---|---|
| 1 | "Boundary"; Transliteration: "Kyōkai" (Japanese: 境界) | January 5, 2013 |
Five years prior everyone in Ōtsuka village died from a plague, but there were 3 survivors, Shino Inuzuka, Sosuke Inukawa and Hamaji. They take shelter in a church in a nearby village, which borders a dark and dangerous forest. The church, as well as the survivors, are viewed with suspicion by the villagers. The Imperial Church comes in search of "Murasame" the demon blade that contains "life", which Shino possesses.
| 2 | "Demonic Human"; Transliteration: "Jinki" (Japanese: 人鬼) | January 12, 2013 |
Hamaji is kidnapped by the 5 Kitsune and the master, Osaki Kaname. Shino and Sosuke travel to the city where they encounter Satomi Rio, one of the four beast clans, whom transports them to an inn and informs them that Hamaji is safe and that they'll be reunited with her the next day. In the meantime, Shino wanders curiously around the city with Murasame, where he hears a rumor of a demon that eats spirits. Shinto gets trampled on by a man named Kobungo during a dispute with several monks and their head Seiran, over the whereabouts of someone named Genpachi. Seiran claims that Genpachi is a demon that cannot be released, however Seiran has ulterior motives and plans to release the demon. He believes that the demon will begin to eat humans after it is done with spirits. Kobungo treats Shino to lunch and afterward Shino is picked up by Murasame and Sousuke (in dog form). Back at the inn, Sousuke leaves for a walk as Satomi arrives with his spirit beast. Satomi comments that while Shino remembers him from 5 years ago, Sousuke doesn't seem to and he mentions that Shino hasn't aged as a result of his relationship with Murasame. The sword of Murasame is a mystery, which no one has much knowledge of, including whether its presence is good or bad since Murasame has the power to "tear through all magic, make all spirits cower and subdue everything formless on earth". Rio states that Shino's stunted growth is a result of hosting such power within him, which will eventually consume him in the end, and he will die a horrible death. Meanwhile, Kobungo is still worried about Genpachi being held captive and he remembers how he and Genpachi survived the Northern front lines. Shino and Sousuke arrive at the mansion where Hamaji is being kept and they discover that Satomi also resides there. They decide to stay there for a while. While touring the city, Sousuke asks Shino how he knows Satomi, but Shino avoids the question. A demon insect, which is a minion of Seiran, is caught spying on Shino. Seiran visits a chained Genpachi after several days of starvation. He attacks Genpachi with his insect demon minions because he refuses to take his demon form and instead mocks him that he should cool down about his little brother taking his birthright.
| 3 | "Demon Hunter"; Transliteration: "Kioi" (Japanese: 鬼追) | January 19, 2013 |
Shino and Sosuke are reunited safely with Hamaji at the Villa. Shino tells Sosuke that they were saved by Satomi Rio five years ago. Satomi shows Shino and Sosuke marbles that represent them as one of the eight beasts and asks them to gather the other 6 and locate their owners.
| 4 | "Homecoming"; Transliteration: "Kikyō" (Japanese: 帰郷) | January 26, 2013 |
The demon appearing in the middle of town chasing after Shino wanting to eat him and the monks that hunt demons chasing after. They managed to escape from the monks and the demon return to its own human form who is Inukai Genpachi. Inuta Kobungo, Genpachi's good friend stated to Shino that three years ago, Genpachi and Kobungo's soldier team was attacked by a demon that served in the hostage crisis in the north eating people. Originally they were supposed to die but something stranged happened and ever since then, their bodies have some changes and they are immortality. On the other hand, the demon hunting monk saw Shino with Murasame and hoping to get his hand on Murasame Sword.
| 5 | "Divine Protection"; Transliteration: "Kago" (Japanese: 加護) | February 2, 2013 |
Due to the new moon, Sosuke sleeps for an abnormally long time while Murasame becomes strangely quiet. Shino then bumps into a white-haired, red-eyed girl from the Snake Clan, Mizuki Ayane, that occupies the other half of the abode. In an attempt to become friends, Hamaji sends Shino to the other side with a basket of flowers, to which he angers Mizuki Ayane's guardian god, Hibiki. Shino is saved by Sosuke, who almost cuts off his arm as a peace offering, and is rescued by Ayane. The four of them start to talk about themselves, which compels Ayane to befriend Hamaji. There is a town festival, however, Hibiki is reluctant to let Ayane out of her sight, but eventually gives her consent to leave the house, so long as one of the Osaki foxes remain by her side.
| 6 | "Perquisite"; Transliteration: "Homachi" (Japanese: 外持) | February 9, 2013 |
Shino shows interest in an incident that was reported in the newspaper. Apparently six villagers were visiting Perquisite Mountain in search of a new water source, but become lost. A "beautiful woman" appeared before them and showed the villagers the way back to the village, where they died of an unknown illness. Sousuke searches for Shino, who has gone to the mountain to investigate. While on the mountain, Shino's and Sousuke's beads begin to glow. Destracted by this, Shino loses his footing and falls down, dropping the two beads. While waiting at the train station, Sousuke meets Kobungo, who decides to join Sousuke. After losing Sousuke's bead, a monkey deity appears before Shino and gives him a huge rock of gold. A group of traveling musicians come to the village to perform during the festival, and it is revealed that one of the musicians is Asakeno.
| 7 | "Promise"; Transliteration: "Yakusoku" (Japanese: 約束) | February 16, 2013 |
After discovering that Shino and his group had managed to come out of the mountain alive, some villagers force Shino to bring them onto the mountain for gold. However, the monkey deity is on a rampage, sorrowed that the child he was waiting for had never come back. The child turned out to be the village doctor, who had become too old to travel into the mountains to play with the deity.
| 8 | "Encounter"; Transliteration: "Kaikō" (Japanese: 邂逅) | February 23, 2013 |
The episode begins on a snowy day, where a man lays. "Do you want to live?" asks a voice.
| 9 | "Guard"; Transliteration: "Bannin" (Japanese: 番人) | March 2, 2013 |
Hamaji is moving to an all-girls school dorm. There's a rumor about the guardian of the school and Hamaji asked her roommate if she have seen the guardian of the school but then she said no. Shino encountered the guardian and apparently isn't every good in dealing with cute dolls. After Shino re-encounter again with the guardian this time with Inusaka Keno and also Sosuke, they relieved that they were only worried about Hamaji. The next day, Hamaji's roommate mentioned about how great Hamaji's friends are and then gave an excused to go back to the room. Hamaji then met some girls inviting her for lunch and revealed that Hamaji stays alone. Hamaji ran back to her room seeing a doll on the bed and to her feelings, that was her roommate and thanked her.
| 10 | "Lonely Figure"; Transliteration: "Koei" (Japanese: 孤影) | March 9, 2013 |
The person that Asakeno is looking for appears to look exactly like Sousuke.
| 11 | "Avatar"; Transliteration: "Genshin" (Japanese: 現身) | March 16, 2013 |
Kohaku is sent into a room with another man and just as they begin to argue, Shino comes along. The man threatens to kill the both of them and Kohaku tries to stop him. Despite her attempts, the man misfires and shoots Shino in the neck. Shino lays in the pool of blood and Murasame shows his true form and devours the man. Genpachi arrives at the scene after Kohaku's coworker/friend calls the police. He is shocked to see Shino and carries him out, also noticing that his wound had secretly started to close. While riding hard back to the house, he is stopped by Satomi and Yatsufusa. Sousuke is seen running to the house, where Satomi explains that Shino is fine, but may never awake depending on Murasame's mood. Shino wakes up at that moment, exclaiming that he is hungry, relieving most of the anxiety in the room. However, Shino begins bragging about his little adventure and Sousuke slaps him and leaves. Satomi stops Shino from leaving, revealing that Murasame has still not completely recovered. Later in the night, Shino painfully goes to the shower and stands in the cold water, his body feeling as if it were on fire. Satomi goes into the bathroom after a while, only to find Shino partially conscious in the bathtub. Murasame suddenly acts up and Shino reverts into his 18-year-old body and drinks blood from Satomi's neck.
| 12 | "Price Paid"; Transliteration: "Daishō" (Japanese: 代償) | March 23, 2013 |
Satomi calls Osaki to come and get him some clothes and bandages, while also being visited by Genpachi and Kobungo. Kobungo accidentally peeks through the bed curtains to see Shino and freaks out. He shoves Genpachi out the door, thinking that Shino had become Genpachi's "type" (indicating Genpachi's preferences). Kohaku returns to her abode, and seemingly "devours" her friend. The next day, she wakes up in a blood-stained room and news about the mysterious death of one of the Zuikou Mansion workers spreads. Shino wakes up, still in his eighteen-year-old body, and leaves for the church, where Kohaku escaped to. After Kohaku's explanation of her life story, she starts to grow a pair of rigid wings while Sosuke and Satomi attempt to console her. Shino appears and reveals Murasame as a sword, calling Kohaku an "angel from a picture book," rather than the monster she saw herself as. Shino then falls asleep and once again returns to his child form of a body.
| 13 | "Karma"; Transliteration: "Shukuen" (Japanese: 宿縁) | March 30, 2013 |
Satomi is called for a meeting with the Great Sages of the Church regarding a certain child (Shino) that was allegedly shot yet rumoured to be alive and so they come to the conclusion that if he is immortal and ageless then who is he? Satomi gives a poor retort in an attempt to defend Shino by simply saying "the lad simply suffers from stunted growth" but the elders do not believe him one bit. A meeting is called and so the episode ensues.

===== Season 2 =====
| No. | Title | Original release date |
|---|---|---|
| 14 | "Doll"; Transliteration: "Ningyō" (Japanese: 人形) | July 7, 2013 |
Shino, Sosuke, and Genpachi go to the Imamura doll maker to pick up a set of dolls for the elite church member's order. As they walk toward the house, they meet an old man enjoying the flowers and also hear a voice of a boy, singing to the Sakura trees. Confused, they continue on to the house, where they meet Daikaku and Hinaginu, the children of the doll maker. For some strange reason, the doll maker had disappeared without finishing the dolls. Shino demands that Daikaku, his heir, to finish the dolls, but he refuses, saying that he is unable to capture the expression of the doll. Angry Shino mutters to himself while walking in the backyard, where a young boy chucks a decorated ball at his head, telling him to leave Daikaku alone. Confused, Shino picks up the ball and goes to beg Daikaku to finish the dolls, also noticing the many cat dolls around the room. Shino continues to check out the house, where he finds a room full of live-sized dolls. One captures his attention and he stands in shock -- the doll was the figure of the woman who had killed them. He goes to Daikaku for the second time and asks about the ball and the figure. Daikaku doesn't know anything about the figure, but he is able to tell the story of his cat, who had originally owned the mysterious ball. As night dawns, Daikaku sees one of the Sakura tree branches falling, and suddenly regains the memory of the day he was murdered, unable to comprehend how he is still alive. Murasame mentions the cherry blossoms and Shino follows, only to be hit in the head once again by the strange boy. Joined by Genpachi and Sousuke, they watch in amazement as the boy turns into an orange cat. Genpachi plays along and turns into his demon form, planning on eating the cat. He is stopped by a rude black cat, who is then stopped by the old man they had met earlier. He turns out to be Hinozuka Nachi, member of one of the Four Houses of Sacred Beasts.
| 15 | "Molding"; Transliteration: "Mawari-en" (Japanese: 廻縁) | July 14, 2013 |
Shino confronts Nachi about the magical barrier around Daikaku's house. Meanwhile, the young boy runs off and Shino chases after him. Daikaku stands in the room, slowly remembering the day of his "murder." Shino confronts the boy, which he realizes is Daikaku's cat. The boy falls off a Sakura tree, because his constant begging for blooms had begun to take its toll on the forest. Shino reverts the forest to its original state by breaking the barrier, and the boy begins fearing the return of the "murderer" that had tried to kill Daikaku. Daikaku realizes that his father had actually died and that the man who killed him is coming for him too. When the man killed Daikaku, his cat gave him the Bead of Etiquette, which kept him alive. He wonders back in the present day on how he is still alive. A sudden visitor visits them, muttering over and over -- "Daikaku is my son." Daikaku almost gets eaten, but the cat boy saves him. Satomi visits to find out what happened and scolds them for not bringing the dolls sooner. Shino shows Satomi the doll of their "killer," but Satomi suddenly puts him to sleep and erases his memory. When Daikaku sees Satomi carrying Shino, he suddenly get the image of the doll's face and goes back to complete it. The doll is finished and they begin their travel back, Daikaku mentioning that they will also be moving to the Capital.
| 16 | "Adversity"; Transliteration: "Gyakuryū" (Japanese: 逆流) | July 21, 2013 |
Shino is forced to teach children how to read and write at the church, where he is shunned by most of the children. The children leave to play because Shino had never been to school either, and he is left with a little girl who asks him to read her a book. Shino realizes that she is blind and discusses it with Sousuke. As he ponders over this, Shino meets the owner of the bun shop who gives him free samples and ask for his opinion. He suggests curry and cheese buns, which the owner thinks of as a great idea. Once again at the church, Shino is left with the little girl and he reads a story about a bird to her. The owner of the bun shop comes to the church the next day and lets Shino try out the new samples, which turn into a great success. Shino learns that the little girl's name is Kaho, and writing her name on the ground, the other children become interested in writing. One boy gets annoyed and messes up the writing, and because of Shino's temper, is slapped. Shino goes back to the bun shop to ask the owner about the new recipe, but is met by his family who quickly goes to the family altar. Sousuke and Shino later learn that the owner of the shop had actually been dead for over a month already and the shop had been going bankrupt, but Shino manages to save them by mentioning the recipes which he had mysteriously helped the owner create the last few days. Meanwhile, Shino goes back to talk to the rude boy and shows that he can actually be a truly kind person, just like his name defined. Shino and Sousuke leave, and Kaho is later seen to bump into the "other" Sousuke. He smiles and pats her on the head.
| 17 | "Ignorance"; Transliteration: "Mumyō" (Japanese: 無明) | July 28, 2013 |
The "other" Sousuke asks a black haired girl, "Do you want me to set you free?" Meanwhile, Satomi is discussing a new rumor of corpses suddenly appearing out of nowhere.
| 18 | "In Homage"; Transliteration: "Sanyū" (Japanese: 讃有) | August 4, 2013 |
Sousuke and the "other" Sousuke, Ao, fight, with Shino desperately trying to stop them.
| 19 | "Reminiscence"; Transliteration: "Tsuisō" (Japanese: 追想) | August 11, 2013 |
Nachi's black panther decides to leave the house, feeling that it is too crowded. Shino goes and finds him with Genpachi. The whole crew end up eating dinner together, where Shino discovers that they all have beads, except for Sousuke's stolen one.
| 20 | "Chance Encounters"; Transliteration: "Hōchaku" (Japanese: 逢着) | August 18, 2013 |
Dousetsu comes to the capital in search of his sister. He meets Shino in the Konaya inn. Genpachi, Kobunga and Keno offer to help. Kobungo ends up making a pact with a demon for searching for a red-haired girl unknowingly.
| 21 | "Spirited Away"; Transliteration: "Kamikakushi" (Japanese: 神隠) | August 25, 2013 |
Shino is sent to a place called Ikura to investigate a case of Kamikakushi (spiriting away) by Satomi, saying that the child came back in the same age as he was when he was spirited away.
| 22 | "Heavens"; Transliteration: "Ten-jun" (Japanese: 天巡) | September 1, 2013 |
Shinobu is taken away by the Tengu which live in the mountains. Shino and Sousuke follow him, only to be stopped by Ao, who tells Shino that the princess will be revived in a short time and that Shino will never be able to collect all the beads before that.
| 23 | "Twin Moons"; Transliteration: "Sōtsuki" (Japanese: 双月) | September 8, 2013 |
Shinobu awakens to his Tengu lineage as Ao threatens Hazuki. Shino and Sosuke finally gathers all 8 bead holders, while something is starting to affect Sosuke.
| 24 | "Crossroads"; Transliteration: "Kiro" (Japanese: 岐路) | September 15, 2013 |
Shinobu arrives at the Konna-ya, gathering all eight bead holders, but still missing Sosuke's Bead of Duty. Meanwhile, Keno and Rio inform Shino of Sosuke's condition, caused by his Bead of Duty seemingly choosing Ao as its rightful holder.
| 25 | "Pursuit"; Transliteration: "Okkake" (Japanese: 追駆) | September 22, 2013 |
As Sosuke's condition worsens, Shino and the others head for the Old Church after learning of Ao's business there. To their shock, they discover that Tamazusa was already waiting for them. She sends her servants to attack them tiring them. Shino protects Shinobu, taking a fatal hit. At that point, all the Eight Bead Holders have arrived and she takes away all eight bead holders' powers to begin her ritual to fuse with Fusehime.
| 26 | "Destiny"; Transliteration: "Unmei" (Japanese: 運命) | September 29, 2013 |
Ao makes an attempt to take Shino away so the Ritual would not happen betraying Tamazusa. Due to Shino's strong wishes, Sosuke wakes up from his comatose state therefore stopping the Ritual. The beads come back to the owners and they regain their powers. Sousuke quickly leaves to find Shino after discovering Shino left to pursue Ao. Murasame starts activating due to the wound that Shino sustained earlier and quickly transforms into its monster like state. Several attempts are made to stop him but failed. Sosuke himself arrives to stop Shino and after some persuasion, he succeeds. After the battle, they all go back to the city to rest and soon, go through their normal routines until Shino discovers that Ao still has Sosuke's bead and thus, his quest to get all the beads is still not finished. However this time, they wouldn't be alone that they would have all of their friends to help them. The episode ends with Shino promising that he would definitely get back Sosuke's bead.

== See also ==
- Super Lovers, another manga by the same author
