= 39th Locarno Film Festival =

Film festival in Locarno, Switzerland

- Location: Locarno, Switzerland
- Founded: 1946
- Awards: Golden Leopard: Jezioro Bodeńskie directed by Janusz Zaorski
- Artistic director: David Strieff
- Festival date: Opening: 7 August 1986; Closing: 17 August 1986
- Website: LFF

Locarno Film Festival
- 40th 38th

The 39th Locarno Film Festival was held from 7 to 17 August 1986 in Locarno, Switzerland. A special section paying tribute to writer Ennio Flaiano, who worked on such films as La Notte and La Dolce Vita, was screened. Another retrospective tribute section was held for deceased Swiss actor François Simon. A ceremony dedicated to him was attended by his colleagues Jeanne Moreau, Alan Tanner, Thomas Koerfer, and Daniel Schmid. The normal Critics Week section was not held this year. There was also a surprise screening of A Lonely Woman, which was director Agnieszka Holland's last film she made in Poland before leaving.

This year, two films shot scenes at the festival, on location, for use in future movies, including what would become the 1987 film Remake directed by Ansano Giannarelli.

The director of the TV section, Giancarlo Bertelli, who pioneered the television movie competition at the Locarno film festival, was vindicated when the FIAPF adopted his rules as the framework for all future television competitions at other festivals. The television section continued to be a growing part of the festival and attracted many television buyers from networks, including RAI.

The Golden Leopard, the festival's top prize, was awarded to Jezioro Bodeńskie directed by Janusz Zaorski.

== Juries ==
=== International Jury – Main Competition ===
- Ida di Benedetto, Italian actress
- Henri Alekan, French cinematographer
- Donald Richie, American writer and film historian
- Fredi M. Murer, Swiss film director
- Krysztof Kieslowski, Polish director and writer
- Hanns Zischler, German actor
- Lea Pool, Canadian-Swiss director and writer

=== TV Jury ===
- Elke Baur, German TV director
- Sandro Bertossa, Swiss
- Jean-Michel Ribes, French writer and director
- Howard Shuman, British writer and director
- Mario Soldati, Italian writer and director

== Official Sections ==
The following films were screened in these sections:

=== Main Competition ===
==== Feature films ====
| Original Title | English Title | Director(s) | Year | Production Country |
|---|---|---|---|---|
| 40m^{2} Deutschland | Forty Square Meters of Germany | Tevfik Baser | 1986 | Germany |
| Com Licença Eu Vou À Luta | Excuse Me I Go to the Fight | Luis Farias | 1986 | Brazil |
| Debshishu | | Utpalendu Chakraborty | 1986 | India |
| Diapason | Tuning Fork | Jorge Polaco | 1986 | Argentina |
| Die Walsche | The Walsche | Werner Masten | 1986 | Germany |
| Dolce Assenza | The Sweet Absence | Claudio Sestieri | 1986 | Italy |
| Double Messieurs | Double Gentlemen | Jean-François Stévenin | 1986 | France |
| Ghame Afghan | | Zmarai Kasi, Mark Rissi | 1986 | Switzerland |
| Jezioro Bodeńskie | | Janusz Zaorski | 1986 | Poland |
| Jour Et Nuit | Day and Night | Jean-Bernard Menoud | 1986 | Switzerland |
| Kali Patridha Syndrophe | Happy Homecoming Comrade | Lefteris Xanthopoulos | 1986 | Greece |
| Kayako No Tameni | For Kayako | Kohei Oguri | 1985 | Japan |
| Lamb | | Colin Gregg | 1985 | Great Britain |
| Liechang Zhasa | On the Hunting Ground | Zhuangzhuang Tian | 1985 | China |
| Memories D'Un Juif Tropical | Memories of a Tropical Jew | Joseph Morder | 1984 | France |
| Moj Droug Ivan Lapchin | My Friend Ivan Lapshin | Aleksei Yuryevich German | 1984 | Russia |
| Una Casa In Bilico | A House in the Balance | Antonietta De Lillo, Giorgio Magliulo | 1986 | Italy |

==== Television Movies ====
TV-Movies In Competition
| Original Title | English Title | Director(s) | Year | Production Country |
|---|---|---|---|---|
| A Better Class Of Person | | Frank Cvitanovich | 1985 | Great Britain |
| A Time To Live | | Rick Wallace | 1985 | USA |
| An Early Frost | | John Erman | 1985 | USA |
| Avanti Popolo | Forward People | Rafi Bukaee | 1986 | Israel |
| Choma Ke Nero | Employees Chocmore | Fredy Vianellis | 1985 | Greece |
| Hautnah | Up Close | Peter Schulze-Rohr | 1985 | Germany |
| Love Is Never Silent | | Joseph Sargent | 1985 | USA |
| Mrs. Delafield Wants To Marry | | George Schaefer | 1986 | USA |
| Passion Flower | | Joseph Sargent | 1986 | USA |
| Piege À Flics | Cop Trap | Dominique Othenin-Girard | 1986 | Switzerland |
| Silas Marner | | Giles Foster | 1985 | Great Britain |
| Silent Twins | | Jon Amiel | 1986 | Great Britain |
| Thicker Than Water | | Gray Hofmeyer | 1986 | South Africa |
| Turning To Stone | | Eric Till | 1986 | Canada |

=== Out of Competition (Fuori Concorso) ===
Main Program / Feature Films Out of Competition

| Original Title | English Title | Director(s) | Year | Production Country |
|---|---|---|---|---|
| Anne Trister | | Léa Pool | 1985 | Canada |
| Dawandeh | | Amir Naderi | 1984 | Iran |
| Der Pendler | The Commuter | Bernhard Giger | 1986 | Switzerland |
| Desert Bloom | | Eugene Corr | 1985 | USA |
| Down By Law | | Jim Jarmusch | 1985 | USA |
| Frida-Naturaleza Viva | Frida-Naturalza Viva | Paul Leduc | 1984 | Mexico |
| Genesis | | Mrinal Sen | 1986 | India, France |
| Home Of The Brave | | Laurie Anderson | 1985 | USA |
| La Messa È Finita | The Mass is over | Nanni Moretti | 1985 | Italy |
| Laputa | | Helma Sanders-Brahms | 1986 | Germany |
| Maine Ocean | | Jacques Rozier | 1986 | France |
| Mambru Se Fue A La Guerre | Mambru Went to the Guerre | Fernando Fernán Gómez | 1986 | Spain |
| Motten Im Licht | Moths in the Light | Urs Egger | 1986 | Switzerland |
| My Beautiful Laundrette | | Stephen Frears | 1985 | Great Britain |
| Müllers Büro | Müller's Office | Niki List | 1986 | Austria |
| Noir Et Blanc | Black and White | Claire Devers | 1985 | France |
| Rih Essed | | Nouri Bouzid | 1986 | Tunisia |
| She's Gotta Have It | | Spike Lee | 1986 | USA |
| Shin Yorokoby Mo Kanashimi Mo Ikutoshitsuki | New Joy by and Sadness Have Been Around for many Years | Keisuke Kinoshita | 1985 | Japan |
| Sleepwalk | | Sara Driver | 1985 | USA |
| Tong Nien Wang Shi | Tong NIE Wang Shi | Hou Hsiao-Hsien | 1986 | Taiwan |
| Trouble In Mind | | Alan Rudolph | 1985 | USA |
| Um Adeus Portugues | A Portuguese Goodbye | João Botelho | 1985 | Portugal |
| Visszaszamlalas | Countdown | Pal Erdöss | 1985 | Hungary |

=== Special Sections ===
==== Greek National Cinema Week ====
Greek National Cinema Week
| Original Title | English Title | Director(s) | Year | Production Country |
|---|---|---|---|---|
| Anaparastasi | The Reconstruction | Theo Angelopoulos | 1970 | Greece |
| I Dromi Tis Agapis Ine Nichterini | Love Wanders in the Night | Frieda Liappa | 1981 | Greece |
| Karkalou | Shrimp | Stavros Tornes | 1984 | Greece |
| O Megalexandros | Alexander the Great | Theo Angelopoulos | 1980 | Greece |
| O Thiassos | The Travelling Players | Theo Angelopoulos | 1975 | Greece |
| O Vlasmos Tis Aphroditis | The Rape of Aphrodite | Andreas Panzis | 1985 | Greece |
| Petrina Chronia | The Stone Years | Pantelis Voulgaris | 1985 | Greece |
| Taxidi Sta Kythira | Voyage to Cythera | Theo Angelopoulos | 1984 | Greece |
| Topos | | Antonietta Anghelidi | 1985 | Greece |
| Varieté | Varietes | Nikos Panayotopoulos | 1984 | Greece |

==== Retrospective – Keisuke Kinoshita ====
Keisuke Kinoshita Retrospective
| Original title | English title | Director(s) | Year | Production country |
|---|---|---|---|---|
| Eien No Hito | Eternal Person | Keisuke Kinoshita | 1961 | Japan |
| Fuefukigawa | Fuefuki River | Keisuke Kinoshita | 1960 | Japan |
| Fuzen No Tomoshibi | The Light of Failure | Keisuke Kinoshita | 1957 | Japan |
| Hakai | Apostasy | Keisuke Kinoshita | 1948 | Japan |
| Hanasaku Minato | Flowering Port | Keisuke Kinoshita | 1943 | Japan |
| Haru No Yume | Spring Dream | Keisuke Kinoshita | 1960 | Japan |
| Karumen Junjosu | Carmen's Pure Love | Keisuke Kinoshita | 1952 | Japan |
| Karumen Kokyo Ni Kaeru | Carmen Comes Home | Keisuke Kinoshita | 1951 | Japan |
| Koge | Boil | Keisuke Kinoshita | 1964 | Japan |
| Narayama Bushi-Ko | Heijoyama be C-Ko | Keisuke Kinoshita | 1958 | Japan |
| Nihon No Higeki | A Japanese Tragedy | Keisuke Kinoshita | 1953 | Japan |
| Nijushi No Hitomi | Twenty-Four Eyes | Keisuke Kinoshita | 1954 | Japan |
| Nogiku No Gotoki Kimi Nariki | She Was Like a Wild Chrysanthemum | Keisuke Kinoshita | 1955 | Japan |
| Onna No Sono | The Garden of Women | Keisuke Kinoshita | 1954 | Japan |
| Onna | Woman | Keisuke Kinoshita | 1948 | Japan |
| Osoneke No Asa | Late Sleep at Home Morning | Keisuke Kinoshita | 1946 | Japan |
| Rikugun | Army | Keisuke Kinoshita | 1944 | Japan |
| Shinshaku Yotsua Kaidan (I-Ii) | The Yotsuya Ghost Story I & II | Keisuke Kinoshita | 1949 | Japan |
| Shonenki | First Year | Keisuke Kinoshita | 1951 | Japan |
| Taiko To Bara | Drum and Rose | Keisuke Kinoshita | 1956 | Japan |
| Yuyakegumo | Sunset Tools Too | Keisuke Kinoshita | 1956 | Japan |

==== Special Program ====
Special Program
| Original title | English title | Director(s) | Year | Production country |
|---|---|---|---|---|
| A Futura Memoria- Pier Paolo Pasolini | To Future Memory- Pier Paolo Pasolini | Ivo Barnabo Micheli | 1985 | Italy |
| Dans La Nuit | Overnight | Charles Vanel | 1929 | France |
| De La Vie De Potapov | From the Vineyard of Potapov | Nikolai Skouibine | | Russia |
| Der Nachbar | The Neighbor | Markus Fischer | | Switzerland |
| Die Schwarze Perle | The Black Pearl | Ueli Mamin | 1986 | Switzerland |
| Half Life | | Denis O'Rourke | 1985 | Australia |
| Kobieta Samotna | A Lonely Woman | Agnieszka Holland | 1981 | Poland |
| Le Voyage De Noemie | Noemie's Journey | Michel Rodde | 1986 | Switzerland |
| Vozes Da Alma | Voices of the Soul | Peter von Gunten | 1986 | Switzerland |
| Yawar Mayu | Yawar May | Araken Vaz Galvao | | Brazil |

==== Tribute To ====
===== Tribute To Ennio Flaiano =====
Tribute To Ennio Flaiano, Screenwriter
| Original title | English title | Director(s) | Year | Production country |
|---|---|---|---|---|
| Fantasmi A Roma | Ghosts in Rome | Antonio Pietrangeli | 1961 | Italy |
| Guardie E Ladri | Guards and Thieves | Steno Monicelli | 1951 | Italy |
| La Notte | | Michelangelo Antonioni | 1960 | Italy |
| 8½ | | Federico Fellini | 1963 | Italy |
| Peccato Che Sia Una Canaglia | Too Bad It's a Rogue | Alessandro Blasetti | 1955 | Italy |
| Roma Città Libera, La Notte Porta Consiglio | Rome Free City, the Night Brings Advice | Marcello Pagliero | 1946 | Italy |

===== Tribute To François Simon =====
Tribute To François Simon (1917-1982)
| Original title | English title | Director(s) | Year | Production country |
|---|---|---|---|---|
| Charles Mort Ou Vif? | Charles Dead or Lively? | Alain Tanner | 1969 | Switzerland |
| Der Tod Des Flohzirkusdirektors | The Death of the Flea Circus Director | Thomas Koerfer | 1973 | Switzerland |
| François Simon - La Presence | François Simon - The Presence | Louis Mouchet, Ana Simon | 1986 | Switzerland |
| La Grande Guerre Du Sonderbund | The Great War of the Sonderbund | Alain Bloch | 1982 | Switzerland |
| Les Chemins De L'Exil | The Paths of Exile | Claude Goretta | 1979 | Switzerland |
| Les Mefaits Du Tabac | MEFAITS of TOBAC | Roger Burckhardt | 1981 | Switzerland |
| Lumière | Light | Jeanne Moreau | 1976 | France |

=== Swiss Information ===
Swiss Information - Documentaries
| Original title | English title | Director(s) | Year | Production country |
|---|---|---|---|---|
| Der Schöne Augenblick | The Nice Moment | Pio Corradi, Friedrich Kappeler | 1985 | Switzerland |
| Die Sinkende Arche | The Falling Ark | Bernhard Lehner, Konrad Wittmer | 1986 | Switzerland |
| La Scomparsa Di Ettore Maiorana | The Disappearance of Ettore Maiorana | Fosco Dubini, Donatello Dubini | 1986 | Switzerland |
Swiss Information - Fiction Feature
| Augenblick | | Franz Reichle | 1986 | Switzerland |
| Das Kalte Paradies | The Cold Paradise | Bernard Safarik | | Switzerland |
| Der Schwarze Tanner | The Black Tanner | Xavier Koller | 1986 | Switzerland |
| Edvige Scimitt | Edvige Scimite | Mathias Zschokke | 1985 | Switzerland |
| El Suizo, Un Amour En Espagne | El Suizo, a Love in Spain | Richard Dindo | 1985 | Switzerland |
| Hammer | | Bruno Moll | 1986 | Switzerland |
| Marlove-Eine Ode Für Heisenberg | Marlove-Ein Ode for Heisenberg | Bernard Safarik | 1986 | Switzerland |
| No Man'S Land | | Alain Tanner | 1985 | Switzerland |
| Precis | Just | Véronique Goël | 1985 | Switzerland |
| Signé Renart | Signed Renart | Michel Soutter | 1985 | Switzerland |
Swiss Information - Shorts And Fictional Films
| A Name Or Her Desire | | Jakob Berger | 1985 | Switzerland |
| Basta | It Just is | Anne Cuneo | 1986 | Switzerland |
| Der Junge Eskimo | The Young Eskimo | Peter Volkart | 1986 | Switzerland |
| Love Inc. | | Franz Walser | 1985 | Switzerland |
| Movie Star | | Markus Imboden | 1986 | Switzerland |
| Questions D'Optique | Optical Questions | Claude Luyet | 1986 | Switzerland |
| Travaux D'Approche | Approach | Claude Luyet | | Switzerland |
| Trott | | Till Dellers, Ruben Dellers | 1986 | Switzerland |
| Verhängte Ineinander Die Glieder, Die Bleichen | Imposed the Limbs, the Bleaching | Rainer M. Trinkler | | Switzerland |
| Zum Beispiel Sonja W. | For Example Sonja W. | Jörg Helbling | 1986 | Switzerland |

== Official Awards ==
=== International Jury ===
- Golden Leopard: Jezioro Bodeńskie directed by Janusz Zaorski
- Silver Leopard: 40m^{2} Deutschland directed by Tevfik Baser
- Bronze Leopard: Lamb directed by Colin Gregg
- Ernest Artaria Prize: My Friend Ivan Lapshin directed by Aleksei Yuryevich German
- Special Mention: Kali Patridha Syndrophe (Happy Homecoming Comrade) directed by Lefteris Xanthopoulos, Fernanda Torres in Com Licença Eu Vou À Luta, Diapason directed by Jorge Polac

=== TV Jury ===
- Golden Leopard's Eye: Avanti Popolo directed by Rafi Buki
- Silver Leopard's Eye: Hautnah directed by Peter Schulze-Rohr
- Bronze Leopard's Eye: Love Is Never Silent directed by Joseph Sargent

=== FIPRESCI Critics Jury ===
- FIPRESCI Prize: My Friend Ivan Lapshin directed by Aleksei Yuryevich German
- Mention: 40m^{2} Deutschland directed by Tevfik Baser, Kayako No Tameni (For Kayako) directed by Kohei Oguri
