= Masao Inoue =

Masao Inoue may refer to:

- Masao Inoue (actor) (井上 正夫, 1881–1950), Japanese actor and film director
- Masao Inoue (wrestler) (井上 雅央, born 1970), Japanese professional wrestler
