= Murasaki Fujima =

Japanese actress and dancer (1923–2009)

- Murasaki Fujima in Thus Another Day
- Born: 24 May 1923; Tokyo, Japan
- Died: 27 March 2009 (aged 85); Tokyo, Japan
- Other name: Ayako Kinoshi 喜熨斗綾子 (real name)
- Occupations: Dancer, Actress, Choreographer, Instructor

Murasaki Fujima (藤間紫, Fujima Murasaki; 24 May 1923 – 27 March 2009) was a Japanese actress and dancer who appeared in more than 75 films.

== Dance career ==
A child prodigy and daughter of the president of Nippon Medical School, Fujima ultimately became a Grand Master of the Fujima style, one of the five major schools of traditional Japanese dance. Following her 1985 divorce from Kanjuro Fujima, the 7th successor in the Fujima style's lineage (whom she had met at age 12 and married in 1944), she started her own Murasaki sect in 1987.

Fujima and longtime partner (and eventual husband) Ennosuke Ichikawa, a star of Kabuki theater, became a prominent couple in Japan's arts community. In the 1990s Fujima portrayed China's Empress Dowager Cixi to acclaim in a grand stage production.

== Film career ==
Fujima is known to Western audiences for her supporting roles in such films as Keisuke Kinoshita's 1959 melodramas Thus Another Day and Farewell to Spring and Mikio Naruse's The Approach of Autumn (1960) and As a Wife, As a Woman/Poignant Story (1961). She also appeared in several of Hisaya Morishige's Toho comedies of the 1950s and 60s, starring with him in 1953's Husband's Festival.

Following a 12-year absence from cinema screens, Fujima played a leading role in Hideo Gosha's popular 1986 movie Yakuza Wives, receiving a "special appearance" credit.

Fujima penned a memoir, Shura no hazama de onna no jijoden (Autobiography of a Woman At The End of Her Struggle), in 1992. She died in 2009 from liver failure.
