= Toshiko Kobayashi =

Japanese actress (1932–2016)

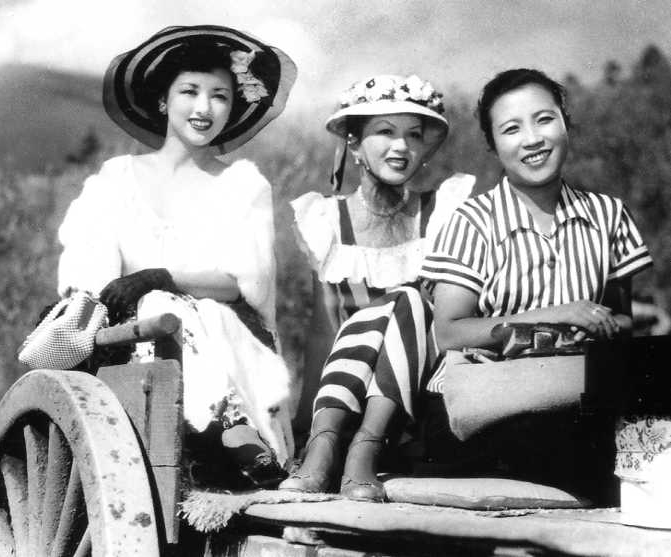
- Toshiko Kobayashi (center) in Carmen Comes Home
- Born: 6 April 1932; Tsukiji, Chūō-ku, Tokyo
- Died: 29 December 2016 (aged 84)
- Other name: Toshiko Teshigahara
- Occupation: Actress
- Years active: 1949–1980
- Spouse(s): Hiroshi Teshigahara (1956–2001)

Toshiko Kobayashi (小林トシ子, Kobayashi Toshiko; 6 April 1932 – 29 December 2016) was a Japanese actress active from 1949 to 1980.

She joined the Nichigeki Dancing Team in 1946. In 1949, she was discovered by film director Keisuke Kinoshita and gave her film debut in his comedy Broken Drum. Under contract with the Shochiku film studios, she starred in many films of Kinoshita and Masaki Kobayashi.

She was married to new wave film director Hiroshi Teshigahara from 1956 until his death in 2001, with whom she had three daughters: Kiri Teshigahara, Akane Teshigahara, and Sakura Teshigahara.

== Selected filmography ==
- 1949: Broken Drum (破れ太鼓 Yabure-daiko) – dir. Keisuke Kinoshita
- 1951: The Good Fairy (善魔 Zenma) – dir. Keisuke Kinoshita
- 1951: Carmen Comes Home (カルメン故郷に帰る Karumen kokyō ni kaeru) – dir. Keisuke Kinoshita
- 1951: Boyhood (少年期 Shōnenki) – dir. Keisuke Kinoshita
- 1951: Fireworks over the Sea (海の花火 Umi no hanabi) – dir. Keisuke Kinoshita
- 1952: Gendai-jin (現代人 Gendai-jin) – dir. Minoru Shibuya
- 1952: Carmen's Pure Love (カルメン純情す Karumen junjōsu) – dir. Keisuke Kinoshita
- 1953: New Tokyo March (新東京行進曲 Shin Tokyo koshinkyoku) – dir. Yuzo Kawashima
- 1955: Twenty-Four Eyes (二十四の瞳 Nijushi no hitomi) – dir. Keisuke Kinoshita
- 1954: Somewhere Under the Broad Sky (この広い空のどこかに Kono hiroi sora no dokoka ni) – dir. Masaki Kobayashi
- 1955: She Was Like a Wild Chrysanthemum (野菊の如き君なりき Nogiku no gotoki kimi nariki) – dir. Keisuke Kinoshita
- 1955: Beautiful Days (美わしき歳月 Uruwashiki saigetsu) – dir. Masaki Kobayashi
- 1955: The Tattered Wings (遠い雲 Tōi kumo) – dir. Keisuke Kinoshita
- 1956: Fountainhead (泉 Izumi) – dir. Masaki Kobayashi
- 1956: The Thick-Walled Room (壁あつき部屋 Kabe atsuki heya) – dir. Masaki Kobayashi
- 1957: The Story of Pure Love (純愛物語 Jun'ai monogatari) – dir. Tadashi Imai
- 1957: Danger Stalks Near (風前の灯 Fūzen no tomoshibi) – dir. Keisuke Kinoshita
- 1959: Thus Another Day (今日もまたかくてありなん Kyō mo mata kakute ari nan) – dir. Keisuke Kinoshita
- 1959: The Human Condition Pt. 1 + 2 (人間の條件 Ningen no jōken) – dir. Masaki Kobayashi
- 1960: Cruel Story of Youth (青春残酷物語 Seishun Zankoku Monogatari) – dir. Nagisa Ōshima
- 1963: The Hidden Profile (風の視線 Kaze no Shizen) – dir. Yoshiro Kawazu
- 1968: Black Lizard (黒蜥蜴 Kurotokage) – dir. Kinji Fukasaku
- 1972: Summer Soldiers (サマー・ソルジャー Samā sorujā) – dir. Hiroshi Teshigahara
- 1980: Woman (ザ・ウーマン Za ūman) – dir. Yoichi Takabayashi
