= Tomoe (disambiguation) =

Tomoe (巴; ともえ) is a Japanese abstract shape that resembles a comma and a common design element in family crests and corporate logos.

Tomoe may also refer to:

== People ==
=== People with the surname ===
- Yukiko Tomoe (Japanese: 巴 ゆき子, born 1935) Japanese pro-wrestler

=== People with the given name ===
- Tomoe Abe (安部 友恵; born 1971), Japanese ultramarathon runner
- Tomoe Gozen (巴 御前), a Japanese female samurai
- Tomoe Hotta (born 1975), Japanese tennis player.
- Tomoe Hanba (半場 友恵; born 1972), Japanese voice actress
- Tomoe Zenimoto Hvas (born 2000), Japanese-Norwegian swimmer
- Tomoe Iwata (1904–2018) is a Japanese supercentenarian
- Tomoe Kato (加藤 與惠; born 1978), Japanese women's footballer
- Tomoe Kawabata (川畑 和愛; born 2002), Japanese figure skater
- Tomoe Makabe (真壁 友枝; born 1974), Japanese judoka
- Tomoe Ohmi (近江 知永; born 1982), Japanese singer and voice actress
- Tomoe Shinohara (篠原 ともえ; born 1979), Japanese singer, actress, fashion designer, producer and artist
- Tomoe Tamiyasu (民安 ともえ), Japanese voice actress
- Tomoe Yamane (山根 朋恵; born 1986), Japanese women's ice hockey player
- Tomoe Yamashiro (山代 巴; 1912–2004), Japanese novelist

== Fictional characters ==
- Hotaru Tomoe/Sailor Saturn, from the Sailor Moon series
- Professor Tomoe, Hotaru's father, from Sailor Moon
- Yukishiro Tomoe, from Rurouni Kenshin
- Tomoe Ame, from Usagi Yojimbo
- Tomoe Marguerite from My-Otome
- Tomoe, a character from Queen's Blade
- Tomoe Koga, a character from Rascal Does Not Dream of Bunny Girl Senpai
- Tomoe Tachibana, a surgeon from Trauma Team
- Tomoe Wajima, a character in the anime/manga Hanasaku Iroha
- Tomoe, the fox yokai in the anime/manga Kamisama Kiss
- Mami Tomoe, a character in the anime/manga Puella Magi Madoka Magica
- Tomoe Udagawa, the drummer for the band 'Afterglow' in BanG Dream!
- Tomoe Enjou, from The Garden of Sinners
- Tomoe, a character in the light novel/manga/anime Tsukimichi: Moonlit Fantasy
- Tomoe Tsurugi, a character from Miraculous: Tales of Ladybug & Cat Noir
- Tomoe, supporting antagonist in the Ghost of Tsushima video game
- Tomoe Kawakita, a character from Cinderella Nine

== Other uses ==
- Tomoe Station (Japanese: 友江駅, romanized: Tomoe-eki), Ogaki, Gifu, Japan; a train station
- Tomoe, a song by Smile.dk from the 2008 album Party Around the World
- Tomoe, the experimental primary school attended by Japanese celebrity Tetsuko Kuroyanagi
