= Thus Another Day =

1959 film by Keisuke Kinoshita

- Two-color release poster
- Directed by: Keisuke Kinoshita
- Written by: Keisuke Kinoshita
- Produced by: Sadao Hosoya
- Cinematography: Hiroyuki Kusuda
- Edited by: Yoshi Sugihara
- Music by: Chuji Kinoshita
- Distributed by: Shochiku
- Release date: 27 September 1959 (Japan)
- Running time: 74 minutes
- Country: Japan
- Language: Japanese

Thus Another Day (Japanese: 今日もまたかくてありなん, Hepburn: Kyō mo mata kakute ari nan) is a 1959 Japanese drama film directed by Keisuke Kinoshita.

== Plot ==
Facing financial difficulties, young couple Shōichi and Yasuko Satō rent their suburban home to his boss over the summer. While Shōichi rooms with a friend, Yasuko and their son Kazuo stay with her family in a troubled resort community, where visiting yakuza and their underlings threaten and injure her brothers, a cab driver and an aspiring singer. She befriends a depressed war veteran whose estranged wife is pressured by the yakuza to become their moll after a sudden tragedy, leading to a climactic confrontation. The couple returns to their home, where Yasuko copes with her renewed desperation at life's futility.

== Production ==
The role of Shusuke Takemura, the veteran befriended by Yasuko, was played by kabuki actor Kanzaburō Nakamura XVII, whose four-year-old son Kankurō (later Kanzaburō Nakamura XVIII) played Kazuo, sharing screen credit with the popular stars who played his parents, Teiji Takahashi—who died in an automobile accident shortly after the film's release—and Yoshiko Kuga. The senior Nakamura received the only solo screen credit among the cast members. Kinoshita capitalized on the singing career of Kazuya Kosaka in casting him as Yasuko's younger brother Gorô, whose proud decision not to aspire to a higher class or calling seems influenced by his kinship with the fatalistic Takemura. Gorô's romantic interest, Noriko, is played by Mie Fuji, making her film debut after being discovered by Kinoshita's brother Chuji, who wrote the film's score; Fuji would appear in one more Kinoshita film before joining Toho, who changed her name to Yôko Fujiyama and cast her in several comedy, science-fiction, and youth-oriented films until her retirement to start a family in the late 1960s.

One of Kinoshita's shortest features, the film's brisk pace includes many cinematic ellipses that either withhold information for later revelation—such as the identity of the driver who transports the yakuza to their vacation home—or permit viewers to imagine sequences that aren’t explicitly shown, such as the fate of Shusuke and Tomoe's daughter; his confrontation with the yakuza who have cuckolded him; and the two visits of Shôichi to the executive's wife.

Kinoshita filmed much of Thus Another Day on location in both Tokyo and the resort area of Karuizawa, which features prominently in the boating and waterfront talent show scenes.

== Themes ==
While the theme of postwar desperation in the Japanese family ethos is familiar in films by directors like Yasujirō Ozu (who also favored plot ellipses), Kinoshita's movies were generally more hopeful in tone than Thus Another Day. The depiction of Shusuke's PTSD is paralleled with Yasuko's depression over her struggle to survive in a consumerist society with a husband driven to succeed within the salaryman culture. Kinoshita's linkage of the two characters, combined with the threats and physical injury endured by the film's two extended family units, suggests a postwar Japanese middle class facing an uncertain and troubled future.

The poem (attributed to Tōson Shimazaki) from which the movie's English title derives could be interpreted as a blithe directive to live a carefree life, but as recited by Shusuke Takemura it instead underscores the film's theme of life's futility:

Yesterday was just another day,
Thus another day today.
Why should I feel uneasy?
Why worry about tomorrow?

== Cast ==
- Yoshiko Kuga as Yasuko Satō, a housewife and mother
- Teiji Takahashi as Shōichi Satō, her husband
- Kanzaburō Nakamura XVII as Shusuke Takemura, a veteran
- Murasaki Fujima as Tomoe Takemura, his estranged wife
- Rentarō Mikuni as Kenzō Akada, a yakuza boss
- Kōji Mitsui as Man A, his crony
- Takahiro Tamura as Tetsuo Mori, the elder brother of Yasuko
- Kazuya Kosaka as Gorō Mori, the younger brother of Yasuko
- Mie Fuji (later known as Yōko Fujiyama) as Noriko, his girlfriend
- Toshiko Kobayashi as Haruko Mori, Tetsuo's wife
- Shūji Sano as the managing director of Shōichi's firm
- Kanzaburō Nakamura XVIII as Kazuo Satō (billed as Kankurō Nakamura), Yasuko and Shōichi's son

== Home media ==
Though the film has not been released on disc in the United States, it was one of the inaugural films available in Spring 2019 for streaming on The Criterion Channel.
