= Isoko Hatano =

Japanese psychologist (1905-1978)

- 波多野勤子
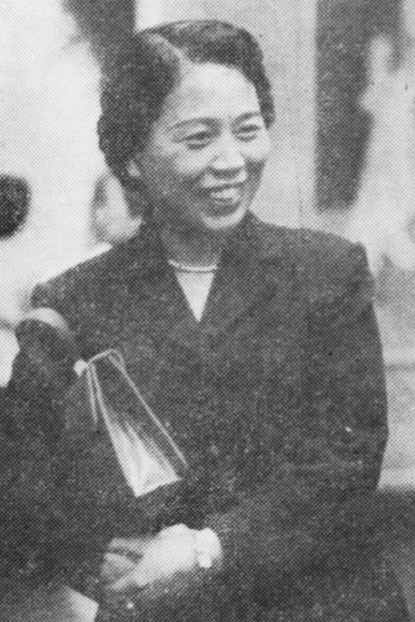
- Born: December 21, 1905
- Died: September 15, 1978 (aged 72)

Academic background
- Education: Japan Women's University; Nihon University

Academic work
- Discipline: Psychology
- Sub-discipline: Developmental psychology
- Institutions: Kunitachi College of Music; Toyo University

Isoko Hatano (Japanese: 波多野 勤子 Hatano Isoko; December 21, 1905 – September 15, 1978) was a Japanese developmental psychologist and writer. Her 1951 book, Shōnenki, was a national bestseller that was adapted into a feature film. She was awarded the Order of the Precious Crown in 1976.

== Biography ==
Hatano was born in Tokyo, Japan, in 1905. In 1927, she completed a degree in English from Japan Women's University. From 1928 to 1937, she studied child psychology at the Child Research Institute at Japan Women's University. She worked as an assistant researcher in psychology and an educational counsellor at Tokyo Bunrika University (now the University of Tsukuba). In 1948, she enrolled as a graduate student at Nihon University. She earned her PhD in psychology in 1956. Her dissertation was titled The Development of Infants and Home Education.

Hatano worked as a professor at the Kunitachi College of Music and Toyo University. In 1960, she established the Japan Child Research Institute. She founded Hatano Family School in 1963. In 1964, she founded the Japan Family Welfare Association. Her husband, Hatano Kanji (波多野 完治), was also a psychologist.

Hatano was the celebrated author of a number of books. She published, in succession, 赤ちゃんの心理 (Psychology of Babies), 幼児の心理 (Psychology of Infants), 小学生の心理 (Psychology of Elementary School Students), and 中学生の心理 (Psychology of Junior High School Students). 幼児の心理 (Psychology of Infants) won the Mainichi Publishing Award.

Her 1950 book, Shōnenki, was a national bestseller, with over 300,000 copies sold. It was translated into French (L'Enfant d'Hiroshima) and English (Mother and Son). The book features letters exchanged between Hatano and her son, Ichiro, between 1944 and 1948. It was adapted into a 1951 movie by director Keisuke Kinoshita.

She died in 1978 at the age of 72.

== Awards and honours ==
Hatano was honoured with Japan's Order of the Precious Crown in 1976.
