= Ryūji Kita =

Japanese actor (1905–1972)

- 北 竜二
- Born: January 1, 1905; Tokyo
- Died: 16 April 1972 (aged 67)
- Occupation: Actor
- Years active: 1937-1972

Ryūji Kita (北 竜二, Kita Ryūji; 1 January 1905 – 16 April 1972) was a Japanese actor. He appeared in more than 280 films from 1937 to 1972.

== Career ==
Kita started out in the film industry in the scenario department at the Shochiku studios, but moved to Nikkatsu in 1937 and made his acting debut in Tomu Uchida's Kagirinaki zenshin. At Nikkatsu, he both starred in films and played supporting roles. After working at Daiei and going freelance, he returned to Shochiku in 1950 and often played fathers, school principals, and company directors. He appeared in many films directed by Yasujirō Ozu.

== Filmography ==
Year	Title	Role	Notes
1938	Apâto kôkyôkyoku		
1938	Etchan banzai		
1940	Rekishi: Dai ichi-bu - Dôran boshin		
1940	Rekishi: Dai ni-bu - Shôdo kensetsu; Dai san-bu: Reimei Nippon		
1940	Kaze no Matasaburô		
1941	Ai no ikka	Uncle	
1941	Kurama Tengu: Satsuma no misshi		
1942	Fuji ni Tatsu Kage	Matsudaira Sadanobu	
1942	Daigoretsu no kyofu	Jiro Koyanagi	
1942	Umineko no minato		
1944	Kokusai mitsuyu-dan	Fargans	
1945	Sugata naki teki		
1946	Aru yo no seppun	Mr. Yuasa	
1946	Tebukuro o nugasu otoko		
1946	Shûdôin no hanayome	Yuriko's father	
1948	Suiren fujin to bara musume		
1949	Niizuma kaigi		
1949	Koi no jusan yoru		
1949	Kane no naru oka - Dai sanhen: Kuro no maki		
1950	Omoide no borero		
1950	Tenno no Boshi		
1950	Sakon torimonocho: Senketsu no tegata		
1951	Zen-ma	Staff	
1951	Chichi Koishi		
1951	Boyhood	Head master	
1951	Tora no kiba		
1951	Hahamachigusa		
1951	Ano oka koete		
1951	Inochi uruwashi	Umesawa	
1952	Tonkatsu taishô	Ôiwa, lawyer	
1952	Musuko no seishun		
1952	Hibari no Sākasu Kanashiki Kobato		
1952	Kon'na watashi ja nakatta ni	Ryûichirô	
1952	Ashita wa gekkyûbi	Taira	
1953	Natsuko no boken	Natsuko's father	
1953	Otome no shinsatsushitsu		
1953	Hibari no kanashiki hitomi		
1953	Kimi no na wa		
1954	Kyûkon sannin musume	Jôjirô Takii	
1954	Seishun zenki	Fukuyama, principle	
1955	Daigaku wa detakeredo		
1955	Kono yo no hana: Daichibu bojo no maki		
1955	Kono yo no hana: daisanbu kaika no maki		
1955	Kono yo no hana: Dainibu hiren no maki		
1955	Aishu nikki		
1955	Robo no ishi		
1955	Kao no nai otoko		
1956	Shiroi magyo		
1956	The Thick-Walled Room		
1956	Taiyô to bara	Masahiro's father	
1957	Akuma no kao	Attorney Sasaki	
1957	Times of Joy and Sorrow		
1958	Onboro jinsei		
1958	Shu to midori		
1958	Equinox Flower	Heinosuke Horie	
1959	The Human Condition		
1959	Kaze no naka no hitomi	Sakae's father	
1959	Ren'ai saiban	Yûicirô Satô	
1960	Rônin ichiba - Asayake tengu		
1960	Irohanihoheto		
1960	Kusama no Hanjiro: Kiri no naka no wataritori		
1960	Yôtô monogatari: hana no Yoshiwara hyakunin-giri		
1960	Hanshichi torimonocho - mitsu no nazo		
1960	Late Autumn	Seiichiro Hirayama	
1961	Shingo nijuban shobu dai ichibu		
1961	Ninjutsu ôsaka-jô		
1961	Who Are You, Mr. Sorge?	Konoe	Uncredited
1961	Gokai senryo yari		
1961	Hatamoto taikutsu otoko: Nazo no nanairo goten		
1961	Tsuma ari ko ari tomo arite		
1961	Hibari no oshare kyojo		
1961	Ninjutsu sanada-jô		
1961	Saikoro bugyo		
1961	Edokko-hada		
1962	Wakaki ni ho Jirocho: Tokaido no tsumujikaze		
1962	Karami-ai		
1962	Ogin-sama		
1962	Hanagasa dochu		
1962	An Autumn Afternoon	Shin Horie	
1962	Knightly Advice		
1963	Yagyû bugeichô: Katame no Jûbei		
1963	Bushido, Samurai Saga	Yazaemon Kitazawa	
1963	Yagyû Bugeichô: Katame suigetsu no ken		
1963	Tange Sazen: zankoku no kawa		
1963	13 Assassins		
1963	The Yagyu Chronicles 8: The One-Eyed Ninja		
1963	Yakuza no uta		
1963	Hibari Chiemi no oshidori senryô gasa		
1964	Zûzûshii yatsu	Viscount Tsumori	
1964	Yume no Hawaii de bon odori	Kanji Kazama	
1964	Yagyu bugeicho: Jubei Ansatsu-ken		
1965	Muhômatsu no isshô		
1965	Umi no wakadaishô		
1965	Miyamoto Musashi: Ganryû-jima no kettô	Sakai Tadakatsu	
1965	Yasagure no okite		
1965	Toba no mesu neko: Suhada no tsubo furi		
1966	Waka oyabun kenka-jo		
1966	Nippon ichi no gorigan otoko		
1966	Tokyo Drifter	Kurata	
1966	Arupusu no wakadaishô		
1966	Hone made aishite	Ogawa	
1966	Waka oyabun abare-bisha		
1966	Kureji daisakusen		
1967	Zatoichi's Cane Sword	Genbei Shimotsukeya	
1967	Kokusai himitsu keisatsu: Zettai zetsumei	Head of Secret Police	
1967	Koi no highway	Daisaku Kaji	
1967	The X from Outer Space		
1967	Minami taiheiyo no wakadaishô		
1967	King Kong Escapes	Police inspector	
1967	Japan's Longest Day	General Shigeru Hasunuma	
1967	Kigeki: Ippatsu shôbu	Prof. Kanetaka	
1967	Junjô nijûsô	Takehiko Kawada	
1967	Zankyo no sakazuki		
1967	Nippon ichi no otoko no naka no otoko	Nakagawa	
1968	Kubi	Saburo Miyazaki	
1968	Rengō Kantai Shirei Chōkan: Yamamoto Isoroku	Koshirō Oikawa	
1968	Aniki no koibito	Nakai	
1968	Seishun no kane		
1969	Go! Go! Wakadaishô		
1969	Dai bakuhatsu		
1969	Battle of the Japan Sea	Kataoka	
1969	Nippon ichi no danzetsu otoko		
1969	Sasabue Omon	Giju	
1970	Ezo yakata no ketto		
1970	Bakuchi-uchi: Nagaremono		
1970	Beast Capital	Kanamori	
1970	The Militarists	Koshirō Oikawa	Uncredited
1970	Shiruku hatto no ô-oyabun: chobi-hige no kuma		
1970	Shiruku hatto no ô-oyabun		
1971	Nippon ichi no shokku otoko		
1972	Tsuji-ga-hana		
