= Yüksel Yavuz =

Kurdish film director (born 1964)

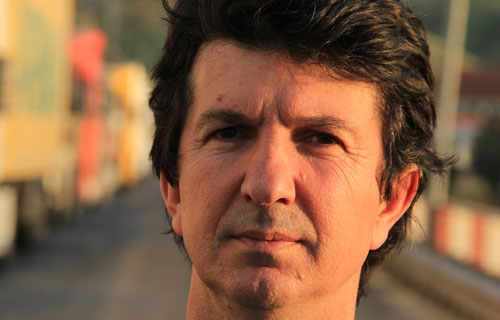
- Born: February 1, 1964 (age 62); Karakoçan, Turkey
- Education: University of Hamburg
- Occupation: Film Director

Yüksel Yavuz (born 1 February 1964 in Karakoçan, Turkey) is a Kurdish film director from Turkey.

== Early life and education ==
Since 1980, he has lived in Germany, where he lived with his father who had found work at the port of Hamburg. From 1986 to 1989, he studied sociology and economics at the University of Hamburg and from 1992 to 1996, visual communications at the Academy of Fine Arts in Hamburg.

== Professional career ==
His first film from 1995 he produced for the German public broadcaster ZDF and is an autobiographical documentary about the experience of his father as a guest worker and his mother, who stayed behind in the village. Since he has directed several documentaries and feature films. His movies often focus on the Kurdish diaspora and the signification of the homeland for the refugees and immigrants. Longing for Istanbul focuses on the several nationalities that have settled in Istanbul while Hope on the human rights of Kurdish people in Turkey.

He has won a number of awards.

=== Personal life's involvement in the movies ===
His father has acted in two of his movies, the autobiographical documentary My Father, the Guestworker and then also in Children of April. Besides a character in the movie Children of April works in a meat factory similar to one, Yavuz himself was working for a while as well. The documentary Close-Up Kurdistan involves places of his childhood in Karaçokan and an interview with a relative.

== Filmography ==
- 1992: Hoch-Zeit
- 1993: Freedom Pension
- 1993: Coromandel
- 1994: 100 und 1 Mark (Hundred and one Mark)
- 1995: Mein Vater, der Gastarbeiter (My Father the Guestworker)
- 1998: Aprilkinder (Children of April)
- 2000: Beyaz mantolu adam (Man with the white coat)
- 2003: Kleine Freiheit (A little bit of freedom)
- 2007: Close up Kurdistan
- 2010: Sehnsucht nach Istanbul (Longing for Istanbul)
- 2013: Hevî (Hope)
