= Farewell to Dream =

1956 Japanese film

- Film poster
- Kanji: 夕やけ雲
- Directed by: Keisuke Kinoshita
- Written by: Yoshiko Kusuda
- Produced by: Kōzō Kubo
- Starring: Shinji Tanaka; Eijirō Tōno; Yoshiko Kuga
- Cinematography: Hiroshi Kusuda
- Edited by: Yoshi Sugihara
- Music by: Chuji Kinoshita
- Production company: Shochiku
- Distributed by: Shochiku
- Release date: 17 April 1956 (Japan)
- Running time: 77 minutes
- Country: Japan
- Language: Japanese

Farewell to Dream a.k.a. Clouds at Twilight (Japanese: 夕やけ雲, romanized: Yūyake-gumo) is a 1956 Japanese drama film directed by Keisuke Kinoshita. It was written by Kinoshita's sister Yoshiko Kusuda.

== Plot ==
After the opening titles, which announce the story of a boy whose dream didn't come true, Farewell to Dream shows the protagonist, 20-year-old fishmonger Yoichi, standing in the shop's backyard and looking out into the distance.

In a long flashback, the film then switches to the preceding events which took place a few years earlier. 15-year-old Yoichi, the second child of five of a poor Tokyo fishmonger and his wife, dreams of becoming a sailor like his deceased uncle. With his binoculars, a gift from his uncle, he watches a young woman living above a beauty salon in another district of the city and makes up a story about her. His older sister Toyoko, much to her parents' concern, repeatedly cancels her engagements, insisting that she wants to marry a rich man and escape her poor upbringing. Toyoko finally marries a much older man, but has an affair with Sudo, her former fiancé. After a heart attack, Yoichi's father is bedridden and finally dies, so Yoichi has to take over the shop and his younger sister Kazue is adopted by another uncle. When his best friend Seiji moves away due to his father's reassignment and the young woman from the beauty salon marries, Yoichi feels left alone.

Back in the present, Yoichi makes a short break during work in the shop's backyard, musing about his failed dream and the people he had to part ways with.

== Cast ==
- Shinji Tanaka as Yoichi
- Yūko Mochizuki as Oshin, Yoichi's mother
- Yoshiko Kuga as Toyoko, Yoichi's older sister
- Eijirō Tōno as Genkichi, Yoichi's father
- Ryōhei Ōno as Seiji Harada
- Isuzu Yamada as Kiyo, Seiji's mother
- Nobuo Nakamura as Haruo, Seiji's father
- Shin'ichi Himori as Kozo Akimoto, Genkichi's brother
- Takahiro Tamura as Sudo
- Noriko Kikuoki as Kazue, Yoichi's younger sister

== Reception ==
Michael Kienzl comments on Critic.de that "Kinoshita relies less on emotional outbursts than on quiet touching moments." He gives as an example the farewell scene between Yoichi and his best friend, in which the tragedy of their parting is conveyed through close-ups of their touching feet and a long handshake. Turner Classic Movies' Rob Nixon draws attention to the beginning framing scene, in which Yoichi's being hemmed in by his circumstances is reflected in the mise-en-scène which shows Yoichi in a narrow frame between two buildings.

== Legacy ==
Farewell to Dream was screened at the Tokyo Filmex in 2012 and at the Berlin International Film Festival in 2013.

== Awards ==
Yoshiko Kuga, who played Yoishi's older sister, won the Blue Ribbon Award for Best Supporting Actress for her performance in Farewell to Dream and two other films. Eijirō Tōno, who played Yoishi's father, won the Mainichi Film Award for Best Supporting Actor for his performance in this film and in Yoru no kawa.
