= I Will Buy You =

1956 Japanese film

- Theatrical release poster

Japanese name
- Kanji: あなた買います
- Directed by: Masaki Kobayashi
- Written by: Zenzō Matsuyama; Minoru Ōno (novel)
- Produced by: Masaharu Kokaji
- Starring: Keiji Sada; Keiko Kishi; Minoru Ōki; Yūnosuke Itō; Mitsuko Mito; Eijirō Tōno; Kōji Mitsui
- Cinematography: Yuharu Atsuta
- Edited by: Yoshiyasu Hamamura
- Music by: Tadashi Kinoshita
- Production company: Shochiku
- Distributed by: Shochiku
- Release date: 21 November 1956
- Running time: 112 mins.
- Country: Japan
- Language: Japanese

I Will Buy You (Japanese: あなた買います, Hepburn: Anata kaimasu) is a 1956 Japanese drama film directed by Masaki Kobayashi and starring Keiji Sada and Yūnosuke Itō. It was written by Zenzō Matsuyama based on the novel by Minoru Ōno.

== Plot ==
Kishimoto is a talent scout for the Toyo Flowers baseball club, one of three competitors who try to buy new promising hitter Kurita for their team. While Kurita's shadowy benefactor and manager Kyuki, who financed the student's education, is making negotiations, Kurita's girlfriend Fudeko tries to talk him out of entering the professional baseball league. The competitors finally meet at the countryside home of Kurita's family, who have their own plans for their son and brother.

== Cast ==
- Keiji Sada as Kishimoto
- Yūnosuke Itō as Kyuki
- Keiko Kishi as Fudeko, Kurita's girlfriend
- Minoru Ōki as Kurita
- Eijirō Tōno as Ogushi
- Mitsuko Mito as Ryuko, Kyuki's mistress
- Kōji Mitsui as Tamekichi
- Tatsuya Ishiguro as Tadashi Rokko
- Jun Tatara as Yusuke Shima
- Akio Isono as Saburō

== Reception ==
Film historians Donald Richie and Joseph L. Anderson wrote in their 1959 compendium The Japanese Film – Art & Industry that "Kobayashi lacked the power to present a really smashing indictment". In his Critical Handbook of Japanese Film Directors: From the Silent Era to the Present Day, Alexander Jacoby called I Will Buy You a "critique of commercial values in the world of sport" which benefited from the persona of actor Yūnosuke Itō.

== Awards ==
- Mainichi Film Award, Blue Ribbon Award and Kinema Junpo Award for Best Actor Keiji Sada
- Blue Ribbon Award for Best Supporting Actor Jun Tatara

== Legacy ==
I Will Buy You was presented as part of the retrospective "Against Authority: The Cinema of Masaki Kobayashi" at the Berkeley Art Museum and Pacific Film Archive in 2019.
