= Danger Stalks Near =

1957 Japanese film

- Film poster
- 風前の灯
- Directed by: Keisuke Kinoshita
- Written by: Keisuke Kinoshita
- Produced by: Ryōtarō Kuwata
- Starring: Hideko Takamine; Keiji Sada
- Cinematography: Hiroshi Kusuda
- Edited by: Yoshi Sugihara
- Music by: Chūji Kinoshita
- Production company: Shochiku
- Distributed by: Shochiku
- Release date: 1 December 1957 (Japan)
- Running time: 79 minutes
- Country: Japan
- Language: Japanese

Danger Stalks Near a.k.a. A Candle in the Wind (Japanese: 風前の灯, romanized: Fūzen no tomoshibi) is a 1957 Japanese comedy film written and directed by Keisuke Kinoshita.

== Plot ==
Three young hoodlums intend to rob the home of the Satō family which lies isolated in the outskirts of Tokyo. The trio's plan is thwarted by people endlessly going in and out of the house: housewife Yuriko's sister Sakura tries to borrow money after she's heard that Yuriko and her husband Kaneshige have won in the newspaper lottery, the new lodger fights with his predecessor over the vacant room, and, after various other visitors, the mysterious Akama, who pretends to know Kaneshige from student days, shows up. Akama eventually turns out to be a wanted criminal who demands the Satō's savings, arguing that Tetsu, Kaneshige's mother and owner of the house, embezzled Akama's parents during the war. The police arrive in time to arrest Akama, and the three wannabe burglars give up their plan. During the end titles, Kohei, the most reluctant of the trio, can be spotted making a report at the police station.

== Cast ==
- Hideko Takamine as Yuriko Satō
- Keiji Sada as Kaneshige Satō
- Akiko Tamura as Tetsu Satō, Kaneshige's mother
- Toshiko Kobayashi as Sakura, Yuriko's sister
- Kōji Nanbara as Akama

== Reception ==
Film historian Donald Richie titled Danger Stalks Near a "delightful and savage little satire" which "shows the suburbs as home of avarice and violence".
