= Yūko Mochizuki =

Japanese actress (1917–1977)

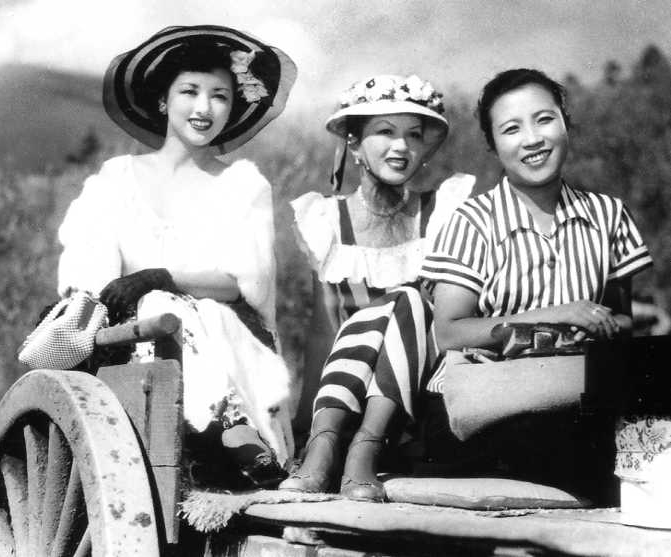
- Yūko Mochizuki (right) in Carmen Comes Home
- Born: Mieko Satomi; 28 January 1917; Tokyo or Yokohama, Japan (Note: Donald Richie and Joseph L. Anderson give Tokyo as her place of birth, while the Kotobank website lists both Tokyo and Yokohama.)
- Died: 1 December 1977 (aged 60)
- Other names: Mieko Mochizuki
- Occupation: Actress
- Spouse: Shigeo Suzuki

Yūko Mochizuki (望月優子, Mochizuki Yūko; 28 January 1917 – 1 December 1977), also billed as Mieko Mochizuki, was a Japanese stage and film actress who appeared in films of directors such as Keisuke Kinoshita, Mikio Naruse and Tadashi Imai.

== Biography ==
Mochizuki left the Tokyo Municipal Oshioka Girls' High School prematurely in 1930 and gave her stage debut the same year with Ken'ichi Enomoto's Casino Folies in Asakusa. She continued with engagements such as the Shinjuku Moulin Rouge and the Shinsei Shinpa, first with light comedies, later with dramatic roles, before signing with the Shochiku film studio in 1950. Her first major role was in Kinoshita's 1953 A Japanese Tragedy. Other notable appearances include Naruse's Late Chrysanthemums, Imai's The Rice People and Satsuo Yamamoto's Ballad of the Cart. She also had small roles in two films by Yasujirō Ozu, The Flavor of Green Tea over Rice and The End of Summer – the latter came into being because she wanted another role in an Ozu film. In 1960, Mochizuki directed the children's short film 海を渡る友情 (Umiwowataru yūjō, lit. "Friendship across the sea") for the Toei Educational Film Department. In addition to her stage and film work, she also appeared on television.

In 1971 and 1977, Mochizuki ran for the House of Councilors election for the Japan Socialist Party. She died of breast cancer in 1977.

== Selected filmography ==
- Carmen Comes Home (1951) – director Keisuke Kinoshita
- Honjitsu kyūshin (1952) – director Minoru Shibuya
- Gendai-jin (1952) – director Minoru Shibuya
- The Flavor of Green Tea over Rice (1952) – director Yasujirō Ozu
- Carmen's Pure Love (1952) – director Keisuke Kinoshita
- A Japanese Tragedy (1953) – director Keisuke Kinoshita
- The Garden of Women (1954) – director Keisuke Kinoshita
- Late Chrysanthemums (1954) – director Mikio Naruse
- Growing Up (1955) – director Heinosuke Gosho
- The Tale of Jiro (1955) – director Hiroshi Shimizu
- Farewell to Dream (1956) – director Keisuke Kinoshita
- The Thick-Walled Room (1956) – director Masaki Kobayashi
- The Rice People (1957) – director Tadashi Imai
- Unagitori (1957) – director Sotoji Kimura
- Sorrow Is Only for Women (1958) – director Kaneto Shindō
- The Ballad of Narayama (1958) – director Keisuke Kinoshita
- Ballad of the Cart (1959) – director Satsuo Yamamoto
- A Town of Love and Hope (1959) – director Nagisa Ōshima
- The End of Summer (1961) – director Yasujirō Ozu
- Kwaidan (1964) – director Masaki Kobayashi

== Awards ==
- 1953 Mainichi Film Award for Best Actress for A Japanese Tragedy
- 1954 Blue Ribbon Award for Best Supporting Actress for Late Chrysanthemums
- 1957 Blue Ribbon Award for Best Actress for The Rice People and Unagitori

== Bibliography ==
- Mochizuki, Yūko (1969). 生きて生きて生きて (Alive, alive, alive). Tokyo: 集団形星 (Shūdan Katachi Hoshi).
- Mochizuki, Yūko (1957). 生きて愛して演技して (Live, love and act). Tokyo: 平凡社 (Heibonsha).
