= Demir Gökgöl =

Turkish German actor

- Born: 15 July 1937; Istanbul, Turkey
- Died: 22 March 2012 (aged 74); Hamburg, Germany
- Years active: 1986–2012

Demir Gökgöl (15 July 1937 – 22 March 2012) was a Turkish-German actor.

He was born in Istanbul in 1937. He emigrated to Germany in 1968. He died in Hamburg in 2012; he had been in therapy for throat cancer for several years.

== Filmography ==
Film
| Year | Film | Role | Notes |
|---|---|---|---|
| 2009 | Soul Kitchen | Sokrates | post-production |
| 2008 | Evet, I Do! | Abuzer | |
| 2008 | Suzuki | Hussein | |
| 2004 | Head-On | Yunus Güner | |
| 2003 | Kleine Freiheit | Haci Baba | credited as Demir Gökgöl |
| 2002 | Erkan & Stefan gegen die Mächte der Finsternis | Grossvater | credited as Demir Gökgöl |
| 2000 | Die letzte Patrone | Grandfather | credited as Demir Gökgöl |
| 1996 | Zwei Tage grau | Incirci | credited as Demir Gökgöl |
| 1992 | Shadow Boxer | Tayfun's Father | |
| 1992 | Auge um Auge | | |
| 1986 | 40 Quadratmeter Deutschland | Hodja | |

=== Television ===
| Year | Film | Role | Notes |
|---|---|---|---|
| 2009 | Heute keine Entlassung | Yussuf Yüksel | |
| 1993–2008 | Tatort | | 2 episodes |
| 2007 | GG 19 – Eine Reise durch Deutschland in 19 Artikeln | Turkish man | |
| 2006 | Wut | Father of Can | |
| 1997 | Einsatz Hamburg Süd | Erkan Tok | 1 episode |
| 1994 | Die Männer vom K3 | | 1 episode |
