= A Japanese Tragedy =

1953 film by Keisuke Kinoshita

- Kanji: 日本の悲劇
- Directed by: Keisuke Kinoshita
- Written by: Keisuke Kinoshota
- Starring: Yūko Mochizuki; Yōko Katsuragi; Masumi Taura
- Cinematography: Hiroshi Kusuda
- Music by: Chuji Kinoshita
- Production company: Shochiku
- Distributed by: Shochiku
- Release date: 17 June 1953 (Japan)
- Running time: 116
- Country: Japan
- Language: Japanese

A Japanese Tragedy (日本の悲劇, Nihon no higeki), also known as Tragedy of Japan, is a 1953 Japanese drama film written and directed by Keisuke Kinoshita. The film tells the story of a widowed mother who turns to prostitution to raise two children during and after World War II, but her children, ashamed of her, reject her. It was ranked as the 6th best film of the year in 1953 by Kinema Junpo.

The film was experimental for its time, with a complex use of flashbacks that creates continuity between the war and post-war periods. Kinoshita also interspersed newsreel footage and newspaper pages within the film in an attempt to relate the story of the film to the wider context of Japan's post-war difficulties. It is a social problem film, with the director having written that: "No matter what kind of social structure, no matter what form of government, I think humans must not be left in a state of misery;” Kinoshita sought to make the film's narrative more realistic than previous hahamonos (Japanese films about mothers).

== Plot ==
War widow Haruke, mother of two children, gets involved in prostitution during and after the Second World War to raise money for the family and secure the children a proper education. Her son Seiichi and daughter Utako, sharing a flat of their own, are embarrassed by their mother's activities and reluctant to her visits. Eager to cut ties with his past and poor upbringing, Seiichi, a medical student, aims at being adopted by an upper-class family. His sister Utako studies dressmaking and attends an English language school, engaging with her married teacher. Eventually, Seiichi's plan is fulfilled, while Utako, who claims that she can't lead a normal relationship after being raped by a cousin as a child, evokes a marital crisis. When Haruke finally realises that she has lost both her children, she commits suicide.

== Cast ==
- Yūko Mochizuki as Haruko Inoue
- Yōko Katsuragi as Utako, Haruko's daughter
- Masumi Taura as Seiichi, Haruko's son
- Teiji Takahashi as Sato
- Keiji Sada as Tatsuya, a street musician
- Ken Uehara as Masayuki Akazawa, the English teacher
- Sanae Takasugi as Mrs. Akazawa
- Keiko Awaji as Wakamaru, a geisha

== Themes and reception ==
In Kinoshita's published introduction to the 1953 screenplay of the film he wrote:

"A Japanese Tragedy is a familiar tale, of people who, despite their house being burnt down in the war and family members not returning, commit suicide unconscious of the tragedy of their situation. I wanted to portray simple people like that. The war widow (Yūko Mochizuki), not such a splendid mother as those who have appeared up to now in films made in the "mother"' genre (hahamomo), but I cannot somehow bring myself to despise such simple people. Japanese politicians advocate the building of a civilized nation (bunka kokka), but miserable people like this are abundant on the streets. No matter what kind of social structure, no matter what form of government, I think humans must not be left in a state of misery."

According to film critic Donald Richie, A Japanese Tragedy was one of the first post-war films to focus on Japanese mothers, as Mikio Naruse's Repast was one of the first to focus on the plight of Japanese wives.

=== Generational divide ===
Kinoshita's film demonstrates the generational shift between those Japanese who participated in the war and the young who inherited its results. While the mother's warm and emotional behavior towards her colleagues and children is rooted in an older style of Japanese femininity, based on servicing others and interdependence, her children evince a more sober, taciturn, and independent public persona. The abuse that the children received from the adults growing up in post-war Japan encourages them to criticize and distrust their elders.

=== Family breakdown ===
Noël Burch saw the film as a sociological depiction of the breakdown of traditional social attitudes towards duty and gratitude for one's parents (gimu). This breakdown was caused by the new values of individualism and economic competition. Thus, son and daughter fail to support their mother and evince no apparent guilt over their treatment of her, instead blaming her for her perceived failures. Another writer argued that one reason why the children don't feel gratitude for their mother and reject her is because they see her turn to prostitution as a choice and not (correctly) as the product of economic necessity; this is due to the new discourse of female emancipation of the post-war culture, under the influence of American liberalism.

=== Style ===
Isolde Standish points out that the newsreels give credence to the "subjective memories" of the characters that are shown in the film's flashback scenes. For example, newsreel footage of American soldiers cavorting with Japanese women foreshadow a flashback scene depicting Haruko's decision to become a prostitute. The flashbacks also provide contexts for the family's present day misunderstandings, when Haruko gets involved in the black market to provide food for the family, but her son Seiichi only knows that the activity causes him embarrassment at school, or when the children's cruel uncle tells them that their mother is enjoying herself at the Atami hot springs, while she is working as a prostitute to raise money for the family.

=== Reception ===
Alexander Jacoby regarded the personal conflict between the mother and her selfish children to be more "vivid" than the wider context provided by the newsreels.

== Awards ==
Kinoshita won both the Mainichi Film Award and Blue Ribbon Award for best screenplay in 1953. Yūko Mochizuki won the 1953 Mainichi Film Award for best actress.
