= Hibari no Sākasu Kanashiki Kobato =

Hibari no Circus Kanashiki Kobato
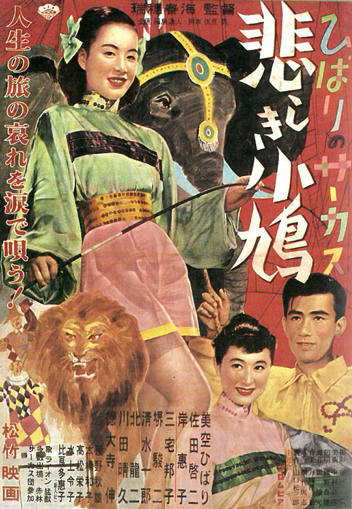
- Japanese movie poster
- Directed by: Mizuho Shunkai
- Produced by: Shochiku
- Release date: July 15, 1952
- Country: Japan
- Language: Japanese

Hibari no Sākasu kanashiki kobato (ひばりのサーカス 悲しき小鳩), "Hibari's Circus: Sad Little Dove" is a 1952 black and white Japanese film directed by Mizuho Shunkai.

== Cast ==
- Hibari Misora
- Keiji Sada
- Keiko Kishi
- Kuniko Miyake
- Shunji Sakai
- Ichirō Shimizu
- Ryūji Kita
- Haruhisa Kawada
- Shin Tokudaiji
- Akio Isono
- Kazuko Motohashi
- Eiko Takamatsu
- Reiko Mizukami
- Taeko Hira

== See also ==
- List of films in the public domain in the United States
