= Kleine Freiheit =

- Region 2 DVD cover
- Directed by: Yüksel Yavuz
- Written by: Henner Winckler; Yüksel Yavuz
- Produced by: Tobias Büchner; Ralph E. Cotta; Peter Stockhaus; Claudia Tronnier
- Starring: Cagdas Bozkurt; Necmettin Çobanoglu; Leroy Delmar
- Cinematography: Patrick Orth
- Edited by: Lars Späth
- Music by: Ali Ecber
- Release date: 2003
- Running time: 100 min.
- Country: Germany
- Language: German

Kleine Freiheit (international title: A Little Bit of Freedom) is a 2003 film by Kurdish director Yüksel Yavuz about the friendship (and later relationship) between two teenage boys who are illegal immigrants in Germany.

== Plot ==
Baran (Cagdas Bozkurt) is a young Kurd who was sent to Hamburg after his parents, who had helped Kurdish rebels, were betrayed and subsequently killed by the Turkish militia. Now that Baran is 16, he is no longer allowed to stay in Germany and faces the bleak prospect of getting deported back.

Baran meets Chernor (Leroy Delmar), an African boy who has the same problem and trafficks drugs to make some money.

Things get even more complicated when Baran spots the traitor of his family and wants to kill him. However, the man pleads for his life and Baran spares him. Finally, both Cherno and Baran, who had made a desperate attempt to free Cherno, are arrested by the police.

== Cast ==
- Cagdas Bozkurt as Baran
- Necmettin Çobanoglu as Selim
- Leroy Delmar as Chernor
- Sunay Girisken as Nergiz
- Nazmi Kirik as Haydar
- Suzana Rozkosny as Alma
- Naci Özarslan as Chef
- Thomas Ebermann as Käpt'n
- Oktay Çagla as Delil
- Demir Gökgöl as Haci Baba

Other cast members (listed alphabetically):

- Alpay Aksungur as Küchenhilfe
- Turgay Aydin as Murat
- Ibrahim Bah as Chenors Chef
- Jasmina Barjamovic as Nergiz' Cousine
- Charlotte Crome as Beamtin
- Abdulrahman Gülbeyaz as Musiker
- Bright A. Isokpan as Tellerwäscher
- Joachim Kappl as Beamter
- Tolga Kaya as Genosse
- Atilla Kiliç as Genosse
- Joanna Kitzl as Meryem
- Samuel Makinde as Chenors erster Freund
- Ismael Nabe as Chenors zweiter Freund
- Piro as Fleischlieferant
- Thomas Roth as Fahnder
- Holger Umbreit as Fahnder
- Cafer Yildiz as Gemüsehändler
- Sema Çagla as Genosse

== Critical reaction ==
In 2003, it was shown at the Cannes Film Festival.

The movie was critically well-received, particularly because of its accurate depiction of the Turkish–Kurdish conflict and the acting prowess of the nonprofessional actors. Cagdas Bozkurt won an acting prize at the Ankara film festival, while the movie won a viewers' choice award in Istanbul (the International Istanbul Film Festival) and it won the 'Grand Prix' at the Ankara International film festival.

Kleine Freiheit, the German title of the movie, ("Little Freedom", translated literally) is a wordplay on Große Freiheit (literally "Great Freedom"), the rather famous name of a street in the red light St. Pauli district where the plot is set.
