= Boyhood (1951 film) =

1951 Japanese film

- Film poster

Japanese name
- Kanji: 少年期
- Directed by: Keisuke Kinoshita
- Written by: Keisuke Kinoshita; Sumie Tanaka; Isoko Hatano (book)
- Produced by: Takeshi Ogura
- Starring: Akiko Tamura; Akira Ishihama; Chishū Ryū; Rentarō Mikuni
- Cinematography: Hiroshi Kusuda
- Edited by: Yoshi Sugihara
- Music by: Chuji Kinoshita
- Production company: Shochiku
- Distributed by: Shochiku
- Release date: 12 May 1951 (Japan)
- Running time: 110 minutes
- Country: Japan
- Language: Japanese

Boyhood (Japanese: 少年期, Hepburn: Shōnenki), also known as A Record of Youth, is a 1951 Japanese drama film directed by Keisuke Kinoshita. It is based on a collection of letters by writer Isoko Hatano.

== Plot ==
When a family of Tokyo war evacuees arrives on the outskirts of Suwa, they are met with hostility by most villagers. The father, an English professor who had to quit lecturing due to his liberal views, opposes his son Ichirō's wish to enlist at a military school. Ichirō, who previously had to suffer mockery at school for alleged cowardice, is now confronted with his new schoolmates' reluctance and bullied by the son of the local military commander. He is also at odds with his father because of his father's staying at home and reading, while the mother works for the family's income. After Japan's defeat, the commander's son tries to kill Ichirō before committing suicide himself for the inflicted "shame," but Ichirō can fend him off. The ending hints at more peaceful times lying ahead for the family.

== Cast ==
- Akiko Tamura as Mother
- Akira Ishihama as Ichirō
- Chishū Ryū as Father
- Rentarō Mikuni as Teacher Shimomura
- Toshiko Kobayashi as Maid Toyo
- Mutsuko Sakura as Mrs. Yamazaki
- Takeshi Sakamoto as Furukawa
- Ryūji Kita as Principal
- Junji Masuda as Yamazaki

== Literary source ==
The screenplay for Boyhood is based on a compilation of letters exchanged between child psychologist and writer Isoko Hatano and her son in 1944–1946. The book was published in 1950 and became a nationwide bestseller. An English translation was published in 1962.

== Awards ==
- Mainichi Film Concour for Best Supporting Actress Akiko Tamura
