= Kazuya Kosaka =

Japanese singer and actor (1935–1997)

- 小坂一也
- Born: May 30, 1935; Nagoya, Aichi Prefecture, Japan
- Died: November 1, 1997 (aged 62)
- Occupation(s): Actor, singer
- Years active: 1952–1997
- Spouse: Yukiyo Toake (m. 1974; div. 1974)

Kazuya Kosaka (小坂一也, Kosaka Kazuya; May 30, 1935 – November 1, 1997) was a Japanese singer and actor.

== Biography ==
He was born in Nagoya, Aichi Prefecture, Tokyo. He attended Seijo Gakuen High School, out of which he dropped out. Kosaka was a classmate and close friend of Tsutomu Hata, a former member of the House of Representatives. He was affiliated with Takeuchi Jimusho, Rokugatsu Gekijo, and Guranpapapurodakushon. He didn't use any art name or pseudonym.

Kosaka was active as a singer. He contributed to the introduction of rock and roll music in Japan and, from 1956, was one of the first to release covers of Elvis Presley in Japan, being nicknamed "Original Japanese Presley". He also participated in Kōhaku Uta Gassen three times in a row.

He made his film debut in 1957, appearing in Toho and Shochiku films. He drew attention to his performance in Keisuke Kinoshita's The Eternal Rainbow (1958). Since then he starred in many films, becoming one of Shochiku's leading actors.

In 1990 he published a memoir with Kawade Shobō Shinsha (which was republished by Shogakkanbunko in 2022).

In later years he battled with a disease while still working as an actor and singer, but eventually died of esophageal cancer in November 1997. He was 62 years old.
