= Ballad of the Cart =

1959 film

- DVD cover
- Directed by: Satsuo Yamamoto
- Written by: Yoshikata Yoda; Tomoe Yamashiro (novel)
- Produced by: Wataru Nakayama; Saburō Tateno
- Starring: Yūko Mochizuki; Rentarō Mikuni
- Cinematography: Minoru Maeda
- Edited by: Akikazu Kōno
- Music by: Hikaru Hayashi
- Production company: National Rural Film Association
- Distributed by: Shintoho
- Release date: February 11, 1959 (Japan)
- Running time: 145 minutes
- Country: Japan
- Language: Japanese

Ballad of the Cart a.k.a. Song of the Cart (Japanese: 荷車の歌, Hepburn: Niguruma no uta) is a 1959 Japanese drama film directed by Satsuo Yamamoto. It was written by Yoshikata Yoda, based on a novel by activist Tomoe Yamashiro.

== Plot ==
In Hiroshima Prefecture during the Meiji era, simple housemaid Seki accepts the proposal of Moichi, an educated mail carrier, who has decided to quit his job and save money for a warehouse by transporting goods with his wooden cart. Seki's parents disown her for not asking for their approval, and also Moichi's mother, a widow, does not accept her as her daughter-in-law, treating her disdainfully. The couple borrows money for a second cart, and Seki joins her husband in his hard labour life. The film follows Seki through familial and financial difficulties and her raising five children over the next 50 years, and ends with the post-war agrarian reform.

== Cast ==
- Yūko Mochizuki as Seki
- Rentarō Mikuni as Moichi
- Teruko Kishi as Moichi's mother
- Sachiko Hidari as Otoyo
- Mitsuko Mito as Natsuno
- Kō Nishimura as Hatsuzo
- Yoshio Inaba as Fujitaro
- Eitarō Ozawa as Seki's employer
- Kumeko Urabe as Ohina

== Production ==
The production of Ballad of the Cart was funded with the help of Japan's National Association of Women Farmers and produced by the National Rural Film Association. Screenwriter Yoshikata Yoda, a frequent collaborator of director Kenji Mizoguchi, adapted Tomoe Yamashiro's 1956 novel of the same name, a notable post-war example of Japanese "peasant literature".

== Release ==
The film was released cinematically in Japan on February 11, 1959 by Shintoho. It was later released on DVD in 2004.

== Awards ==
Ballad of the Cart received awards for Best Director (Yamamoto) and Best Film Score (Hikaru Hayashi) at the 1960 Mainichi Film Awards.

In Kinema Junpo magazine's list of the 10 best Japanese films of the year, Ballad of the Cart reached #4 in 1959.

== Reception ==
Film scholar Alexander Jacoby pointed out the film's depth of characterisation and intelligent script, calling it "exceptionally moving" and "probably Yamamoto's masterpiece".
