= Kane no naru oka: Dai san hen, kuro no maki =

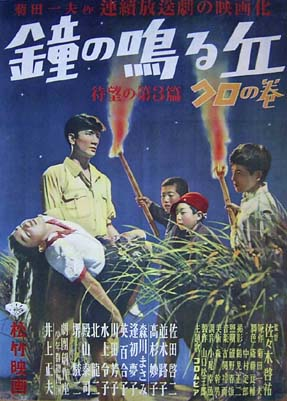
- Theatrical poster for Kane no naru oka: Dai san hen, kuro no maki (1949)
- Directed by: Keisuke Sasaki
- Written by: Kazuo Kikuta; Ryōsuke Saitō; Sadao Nakamura
- Produced by: Shōzaburō Yamaguchi
- Starring: Keiji Sada
- Music by: Yūji Koseki
- Distributed by: Shochiku
- Release date: November 17, 1949
- Country: Japan
- Language: Japanese

Kane no naru oka: Dai-san hen, kuro no maki (鐘の鳴る丘 第三篇クロの巻, Slope of the Ringing Bell Hill: the third volume) is 1949 Japanese film and the final installment of a wartime film trilogy, directed by Keisuke Sasaki, featuring the cast from the previous two Ringing Bell Hill films.

== Production Notes ==
The success of the Ringing Bell Hill trilogy spawned a weekend radio series of 15-minute episodes, produced by NHK, featuring further adventures of a demobilized soldier and a group of war orphans under his care on Ringing Bell Hill.

== List of a film trilogy ==
1. 鐘の鳴る丘 第一篇 隆太の巻 (Kane no naru oka: dai-ichi hen, ryūta no maki; Slope of the Ringing Bell Hill: the first volume) (1948)
2. 鐘の鳴る丘 第二篇 修吉の巻 (Kane no naru oka: dai-ni hen, shūkichi no maki; Slope of the Ringing Bell Hill: the second volume) (1949)
3. 鐘の鳴る丘 第三篇 クロの巻 (Kane no naru oka: dai-san hen, kuro no maki; Slope of the Ringing Bell Hill: the third volume) (1949)

== Cast ==
- Keiji Sada
- Taeko Takasugi
- Masao Inoue
- Michiko Namiki
- Tōdō Gekidan
