= A Lonely Woman =

1987 film by Agnieszka Holland

A Lonely Woman (Polish: Kobieta samotna) (also known as A Woman Alone) is a 1981 Polish drama film directed by Agnieszka Holland.

The film is a political drama about middle-aged Irena (played by Maria Chwalibóg) who lives alone on the outskirts of Wrocław. Because of the film's social criticism it was banned in Poland and did not have a public release for six years.
