= Masao Inoue (actor) =

Japanese actor and film director

Masao Inoue 井上正夫
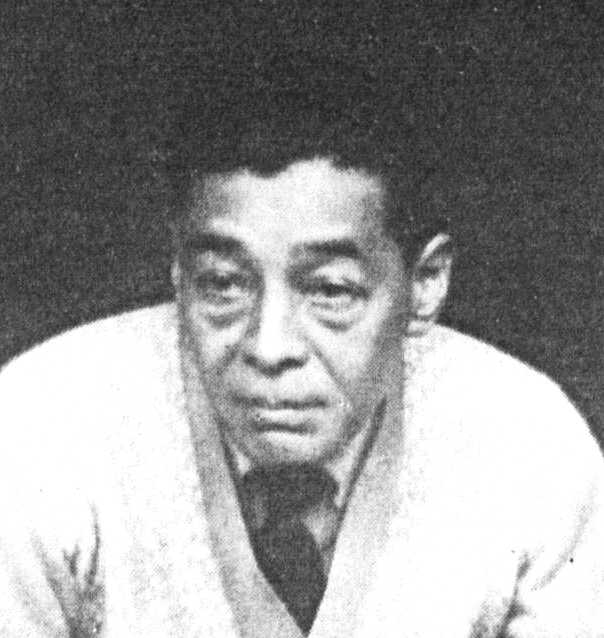
- Masao Inoue in 1928
- Born: 15 June 1881; Ehime, Empire of Japan
- Died: 7 February 1950 (aged 68)
- Occupations: Stage and film actor, director

Masao Inoue (井上正夫, Inoue Masao; 15 June 1881 – 7 February 1950) was a Japanese film and stage actor and film director who contributed to the development of film and stage art in Japan.

== Career ==
Born in Ehime Prefecture, Inoue first appeared on stage at age 17. Starting out in traveling theatrical troupes, he made his debut on the Tokyo stage in 1905 as a member of Hōyō Ii's troupe. He soon became a prominent performer in shinpa theater, and in 1910 founded the Shin Jidaigeki Kyōkai. He also started his own acting school in 1936 and was elected to the Japan Art Academy in 1949.

Inoue was an early supporter of cinema and directed a reformist film, The Captain's Daughter (Taii no musume, 1917) for Kobayashi Shōkai, at the time of the Pure Film Movement. He is most famous in the West for his starring role in Teinosuke Kinugasa's experimental masterpiece A Page of Madness (1926), which he helped support by refusing payment for his services.

== Selected filmography ==
=== As actor ===
- Kantsubaki (寒椿) (1921)
- Aa mujō (噫無情) (1923)
- Daichi wa hohoemu (大地は微笑む) (1925)
- A Page of Madness (狂った一頁, Kurutta Ippēji or Kurutta Ichipeiji) (1926)
- Kane no naru oka: Dai san hen, kuro no maki (鐘の鳴る丘 第三篇クロの巻) (1949)

=== As director ===
- The Captain's Daughter (大尉の娘, Taii no musume) (1917)
