= Carmen Comes Home =

1951 Japanese film

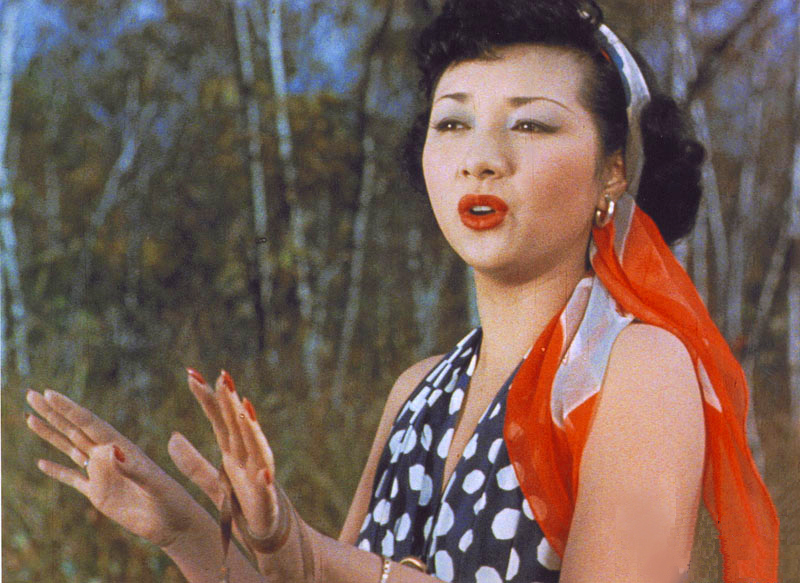
- Hideko Takamine as Carmen
- Directed by: Keisuke Kinoshita
- Written by: Keisuke Kinoshita
- Produced by: Kiyoshi Takamura
- Starring: Hideko Takamine; Chishū Ryū
- Cinematography: Hiroyuki Kusuda
- Edited by: Yoshi Sugihara
- Music by: Chūji Kinoshita; Toshirō Mayuzumi
- Production company: Shochiku
- Distributed by: Shochiku
- Release date: 21 March 1951 (Japan)
- Running time: 86 minutes
- Country: Japan
- Language: Japanese
- Budget: $125,000

Carmen Comes Home (カルメン故郷に帰る, Karumen kokyō ni kaeru) is a 1951 Japanese comedy film directed by Keisuke Kinoshita. It was Japan's first feature length colour film.

== Plot ==
Due to the renovation of the Tokyo based venue where she works, Okin, stage name Lily Carmen, and her lovesick friend Maya pay her small rural hometown in Nagano a visit. Carmen's father, who never approved of her leaving the family, is highly critical of her return, but most villagers are curious for the big city star, including the school principal, who feels honoured for the presence of such an acclaimed artist. As it turns out, Carmen's "art" is a popular strip dance act, which she is about to perform in a show put up by local magnate Maruju.

While some of the conservative inhabitants see morality at stake, others excuse Carmen's eccentric behaviour with the fact that "Okin is funny in the head since she was kicked by a cow as a child". After performing their show, Okin and the again lovesick Maya, who fell for young teacher Ogawa in the meantime, return to the big city. Maruju renounces his share of the show's profits, and Okin's father hands over the money to the principal who promises to use it to give everyone an artistic education.

== Cast ==
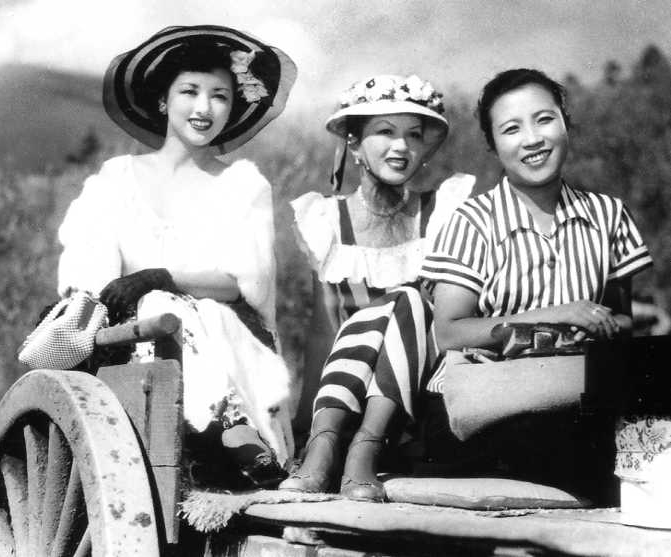
From left, Hideko Takamine, Toshiko Kobayashi and Yūko Mochizuki
- Hideko Takamine as Kin (Okin) Aoyama alias Lily Carmen
- Shūji Sano as the blind musician Haruo Taguchi
- Chishū Ryū as the school principal
- Kuniko Igawa as Mitsuko, Haruo's wife
- Takeshi Sakamoto as Shoichi, Kin's father
- Bontarō Miyake as Maruju, the magnate
- Keiji Sada as Mr. Ogawa, the school teacher
- Toshiko Kobayashi as Maya Akemi
- Kōji Mitsui as Oka, Maruju's assistant
- Yūko Mochizuki as Yuki Aoyama, Kin's sister (credited Mieko Mochizuki)
- Yoshito Yamaji as village youth
- Akio Isono as Ichiro Aoyama
- Kiyoshi Koike as Naokichi Aoyama
- Isao Shirosawa as Kiyoshi Taguchi

== Production ==
Filmed using Fujicolor, it was Japan's first domestic color film. However, as a precaution and due to printing costs, a black-and-white version was also filmed, thus requiring actors and actresses re-performing scenes. Due to the amount of time involved in producing a print, most theatres screened the black-and-white version.

Carmen Comes Home was followed by a sequel, Carmen's Pure Love (1952), shot entirely in black-and-white, which film historian Alexander Jacoby called an "uneasy, somewhat misanthropic satire" in contrast to the "tender humour" of its predecessor. Donald Richie was of a different opinion: while he called Carmen Comes Home one "of the better comedies", he saw its successor as "the greatest [satire] made in Japan".

== Legacy ==
A digital restoration of the film was carried out by IMAGICA with support from the Japan Foundation using an internegative color copy made by Shochiku from 1975. The restored film premiered at the 2012 Venice Film Festival.
