= Tomoe Yamashiro =

Japanese writer and activist (1912–2004)

- 山代巴
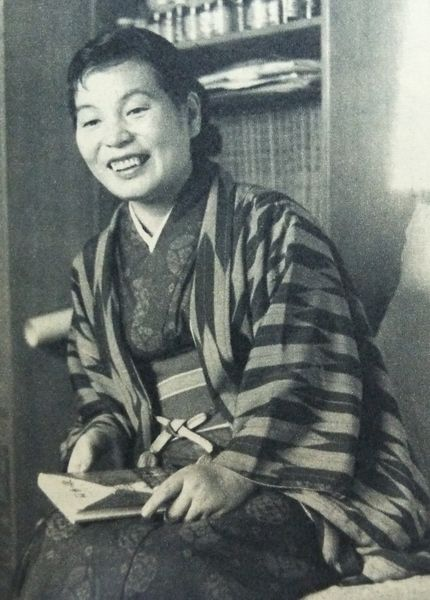
- Tomoe Yamashiro in 1956
- Born: June 8, 1912
- Died: November 7, 2004 (aged 92)
- Occupation: Author
- Writing career
- Language: Japanese

Tomoe Yamashiro (山代巴, Yamashiro Tomoe; June 8, 1912 – November 7, 2004) was a Japanese novelist, and activist.

== Early life ==
Yamashiro worked in the Asahi Glass Company. In April 1937, she married Yoshimune Yamashiro, a political activist who was arrested in the mass roundup of socialists and communists on April 16, 1929.

== Arrest ==
In May 1940, Tomoe was arrested for allegedly aiding in the revival of the Communist party along with Yoshimune. They were both thrown in prison. Her husband died in prison in early 1945.

== Activism and writing ==
After leaving prison following the end of World War II, she became active in agrarianism, and the anti-nuclear movement, and began writing about her experiences. She traveled widely to record oral history from rural women.

== Works ==
- Fuki no To (Bog Rubarb Shoots). published in 1948.
  - Abbreviated translation in Hane Mikiso, Peasants, Rebels, and Outcastes (1982)
- Niguruma no uta (Handcart Songs) published in 1955.
  - Film version: Ballad of the Cart (1959)
- Toraware no onnatachi (Life of Women in Prison) published in 1980.
