= 40 Quadratmeter Deutschland =

1985 film by Tevfik Başer

40 qm Deutschland
- Directed by: Tevfik Başer
- Written by: Tevfik Başer
- Produced by: Tevfik Başer
- Starring: Özay Fecht; Yaman Okay; Demir Gökgöl
- Cinematography: İzzet Akay
- Edited by: Renate Merck
- Music by: Claus Bantzer
- Production company: Studio Hamburg
- Release date: 31 July 1986
- Running time: 80 minutes
- Country: West Germany
- Language: German

40 qm Deutschland (English: 40 Square Meters of Germany) is a 1986 West German film directed by Tevfik Başer, who helped both with the script and the production. The film won several awards, making it one of the most significant German movies of 1986.

== Plot ==
Turna moves from her village, where she has lived all her life without ever leaving, to Hamburg, Germany, with her new husband Dursun. This 40-square-meter, small, sunless apartment becomes her only reality of Germany. Dursun, who is strictly bound to his conservative values, forbids Turna from going outside and integrating into the new society, and he cannot even tolerate her communicating with a little girl through the window. However, one day Dursun dies, and Turna, who does not know the language and has no acquaintances in this foreign country, finds herself completely alone, awaiting the baby she is carrying and coping with the loss of her husband.

== Production ==
40 qm Deutschland was first released on 31 July 1986. The shooting of the movie took 21 days, followed by seven weeks of editing. With only 450,000 DM (c. US$280,000) spent on its output, it was a low-budget production. The only setting is a 40 m^{2} apartment in an old building in Hamburg. Başer, who was chasing a vision he had been fostering for some time, handled the production, the script, the direction, the crew and the location almost all by himself. The church musician Claus Banzer ended up being in charge of the music, Izzet Akay was trusted with the camera and the lead actress Özay Fecht was already known as a jazz singer. Six months prior to the premiere, Baser explained his reasons for the project to the Frankfurter Rundschau:

I want to try to show and clarify some of the thoughts and feelings of people who belong to a foreign culture, about which I criticize some parts but which I also understand because of its tradition. I want the Germans to get to know us, because the unknown is scary and produces hate, as you can see based on the demonstrations against the Turks. Because of that I show the circumstances of the foreign workers in Germany based on this example without even leaving the apartment.
