= Keiji Sada =

Japanese actor (1926–1964)

- 佐田 啓二
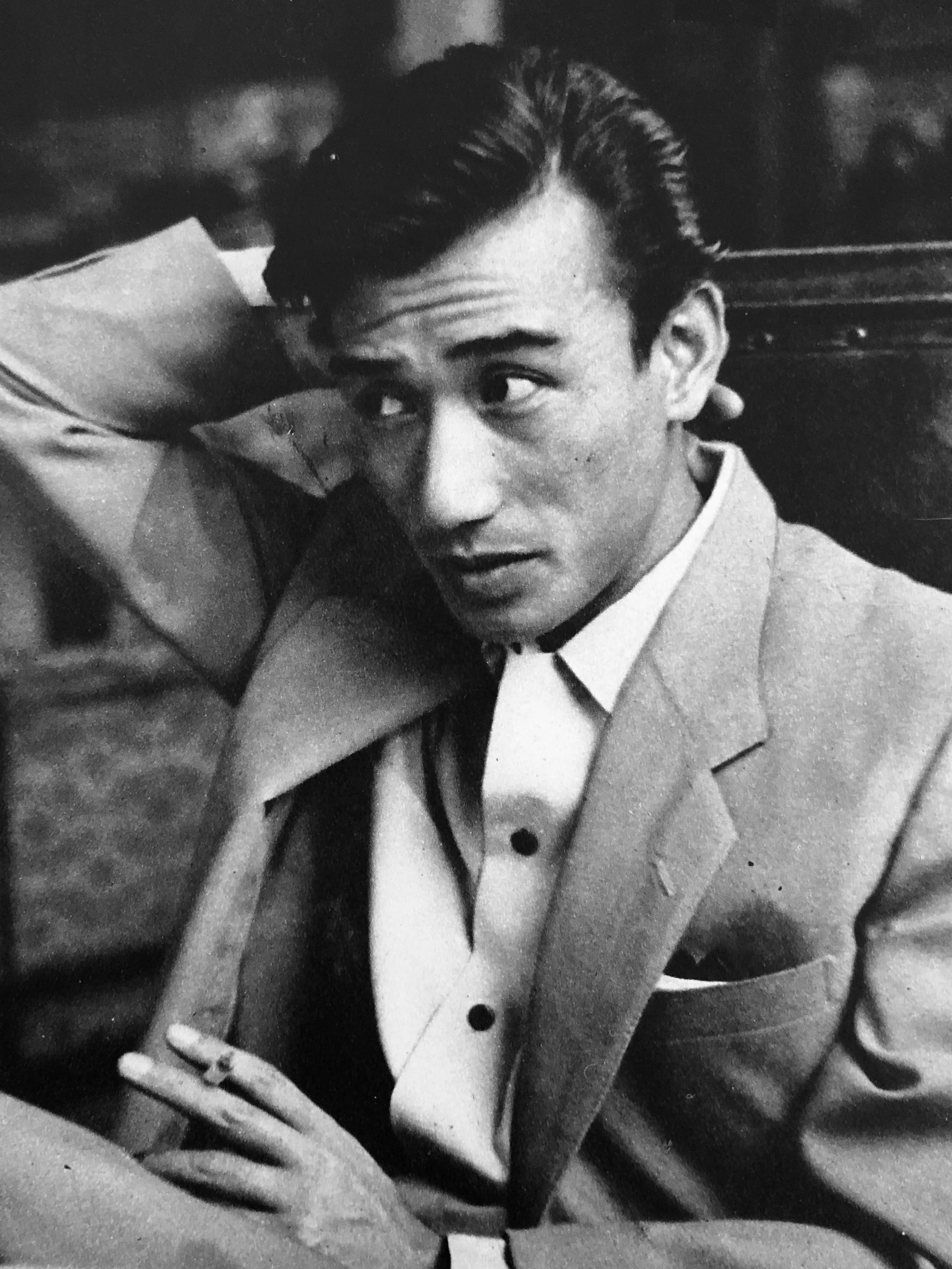
- Keiji Sada in 1955
- Born: Kanichi Nakai; December 9, 1926; Shimogyō-ku, Kyoto, Japan
- Died: August 17, 1964 (aged 37); Nirasaki, Yamanashi, Japan
- Education: Waseda University
- Occupation: Actor
- Years active: 1947–1964
- Children: Kie; Kiichi

Keiji Sada (佐田 啓二, Sada Keiji; December 9, 1926 – August 17, 1964) is the stage name for a Japanese cinema actor active from the late-1940s to the early 1960s. His real name was Kanichi Nakai. He won the award for best actor at the 7th Blue Ribbon Awards for Anata Kaimasu (I Will Buy You) and Taifū Sōdōki. He was the father of the actor Kiichi Nakai and actress Kie Nakai.

== Biography ==
Sada was born in Shimogyō-ku, Kyoto, to a merchant class family. After graduating from the 2nd Kyoto Municipal Commercial School, he entered the School of Political Science and Economics at Waseda University in Tokyo. While a student, he roomed at a boarding house owned by the actor Shuji Sano, and on graduation was offered a position at Shochiku Studios in Kanagawa. He also was given his stage name by Shugi Sada.

In his debut appearance in 1947, Phoenix, directed by Keisuke Kinoshita, Sada was paired with Kinuyo Tanaka in a love scene. As Tanaka was already a big-name movie star, this was an immediate boost for Sada's career. Later that year, he was selected for the lead role in Kane no Naru Oka (鐘の鳴る丘), a movie adaptation of a popular NHK radio drama.

Sada's career took off in the 1950s, and he starred in an average of eight to ten movies per year. In 1956, he was awarded the Mainichi Film Award and Blue Ribbon Awards for Best Actor for his role as a talent scout in I Will Buy You, Masaki Kobayashi's critical study of the institutional ethics of Japanese baseball.

Sada was killed on August 17, 1964, while returning with his family from their summer cottage in the Tateshina Mountains of Nagano Prefecture when their chauffeur collided with a taxi on a bridge in Nirasaki, Yamanashi. His wife and two children were unhurt. His memorial services were held in Aoyama Cemetery in Tokyo with thousands of fans attending; however, his grave is at the temple of Engaku-ji in Kamakura.

== Selected filmography ==
- Fushichō (1947) - Shinichi Yasaka
- Akai kuchibiru imada kiezu (1947)
- Shozo (1948)
- Hi no bara (1948)
- Kane no naru oka - Dai ippen: Ryūta no maki (1948) - Shūhei Kagami
- Kane no naru oka - Dai nihen: Shukichi no maki (1949)
- Ojōsan kanpai (1949) - Gorō
- Beni imada kiezu (1949)
- Yotsuya kaidan (1949) - Kohei Kobotoke
- Shinshaku Yotsuya kaidan: kōhen (1949) - Kohei Kobotake
- Mahiru no embukyoku (1949) - Hidetaka
- Kane no naru oka: Dai san hen, kuro no maki (1949)
- Kikenna ninrei (1950)
- Nanatsu no hōseki (1950)
- Oboro kago (1950)
- Home Sweet Home (1951) – Saburo Uchiyama, Tomoko's boyfriend
- Carmen Comes Home (1951) – Mr. Ogawa, the young school master
- Jiyū gakkō (1951)
- Tenshi mo yume o miru (1951)
- Yume ōki koro (1951) - Shūji Takaishi
- Fireworks Over the Sea (1951) – Tamihiko Kujirai
- Inochi uruwashi (1951) - Shuji Imura
- Honjitsu kyūshin (1952) - Haruzo Yukawa
- Hibari no Circus kanashiki kobato (1952)
- Uzushio (1952)
- Nihon no higeki (1953) - Tatsuya, street musician
- Tabiji (1953)
- Kimi no na wa (1953-1954, part 1-3)
- Ojōsan Shachō (1953) - Goro Akiyama
- Yassamossa (1953)
- Shinjitsu ichiro (1954)
- Kono hiroi sora no dokoka ni (1954) - Ryoichi Morita
- Seishun no oto (1954)
- Kunsho (1954)
- Bomeiki (1955) - Akimasa
- Uruwashiki saigetsu (1955)
- Tōkyō-Honkon mitsugetsu ryokō (1955)
- Tooi kumo (1955) - Shunsuke, Fuyuko's brother-in-law
- Kakubō sambagarasu (1956) - (uncredited)
- Izumi (1956)
- I Will Buy You (1956) – Daisuke Kishimoto
- Taifū Sōdōki (1956)
- Onna no ashi ato (1956)
- Namida (1956)
- Seigiha (1957)
- Doshaburi (1957) - Kazuo
- Xiang Gang Dong Jing mi yue lu xing (1957)
- Tadaima zero hiki (1957) - Yoshizawa, Diet member
- Times of Joy and Sorrow (1957) - Shiro Arisawa, Kiyoko's husband
- Shukin ryoko (1957)
- Danger Stalks Near (1957) - Kaneshige Satō
- Kuroi kafun (1958) - Takashi Kiso
- Onboro jinsei (1958)
- Hibi no haishin (1958)
- Kamitsukareta kaoyaku (1958)
- Equinox Flower (1958) - Masahiko Taniguchi
- Me no kabe (1958)
- Haru o matsu hitobito (1959)
- The Human Condition (1959) - Kageyama
- Sekishunchō (1959) - Eitarō Makita
- Good Morning (1959) - Heiichirō Fukui
- High Teen (1959) - Shin'ichi Teras'aki
- Yonman-nin no mokugekisha (1960) - Masashi Takayama
- Irohanihoheto (1960)
- Onna no saka (1960)
- Blood Is Dry (1960) - Takashi Kiguchi
- Late Autumn (1960) - Shotaru Goto
- Saigo no kiri fudâ (1960)
- Enraptured (1961) - Shōzō Nishikawa
- Kumo ga chigireru toki (1961)
- Immortal Love (1961) - Takashi
- Tsuma ari ko ari tomo arite (1961) - Yonesaku Nihei
- Uzu (1961)
- Hunting Rifle (1961) - Kadota
- Kyōgeshō (1961)
- Senkyaku banrai (1962)
- Aizen Katsura (1962)
- Kaasan nagaiki shitene (1962)
- Zoku aizen katsura (1962)
- An Autumn Afternoon (1962) - Koichi
- Futari de aruita iku haru aki (1962) - Yoshio Nonaka, Torae's husband
- Utae Wakōdotachi (1963) - Singer at the ceremony
- Mushukunin-betsuchō (1963) - Yajuro
- Kaze no shisen (1963) - Shunsuke Kuze
- Hana no Shōgai (1963, TV Series)
- Kekkonshiki Kekkonshiki (1963) - Jirō Okuyama
- Odoritai yoru (1963) - Tadao Tsumura
- Zoku Haikei Tenno Heika Sama (1964) - Ryosuke
- Assassination (1964)
- Aku no monsho (1964) - Shigeharu Takazawa
- Sweet Sweat (1964) - Tatsuoka
- Monro no youna onna (1964) - (final film role)
