= Apostasy (1948 film) =

1948 Japanese film

- Kanji: 破戒
- Directed by: Keisuke Kinoshita
- Written by: Eijirō Hisaita; Tōson Shimazaki (novel)
- Produced by: Koichiro Ogura
- Starring: Ryō Ikebe; Yōko Katsuragi; Osamu Takizawa
- Cinematography: Hiroshi Kusuda
- Edited by: Hisashi Sagara
- Music by: Chūji Kinoshita
- Production company: Shochiku
- Distributed by: Shochiku
- Release date: 30 November 1948 (Japan)
- Running time: 99 minutes
- Country: Japan
- Language: Japanese

Apostasy (Japanese: 破戒, romanized: Hakai, lit. 'Broken commandment') is a 1948 Japanese drama film directed by Keisuke Kinoshita starring Ryō Ikebe, Yōko Katsuragi and Osamu Takizawa. It was written by Eijirō Hisaita based on the 1906 novel The Broken Commandment by Tōson Shimazaki.

== Plot ==
Segawa, a young school teacher in rural Meiji era Japan, hides his burakumin roots, as he had promised his father, who had hoped for his son to live a life without social discrimination. His promise conflicts with his wish to confess his secret to his fiancée Oshiho. Segawa's mentor and future father-in-law Kazama, ancestor of an old samurai family, has just been forced to retire for plain monetary reasons, thus losing his pension. After meeting with prominent burakumin writer Inoko (who is later killed by a group of villagers), rumours about Segawa's descent are spreading. Put under pressure at a public meeting of the townspeople, he finally reveals the truth. With the majority, including Kazama, turning against him, he is forced to resign. Upon leaving the town together with Oshiho, who has decided to stay by his side, he is waved good-bye by his single loyal colleague Tsuchiya and the town's children.

== Cast ==
- Ryō Ikebe as Segawa
- Yōko Katsuragi as Oshiho
- Osamu Takizawa as Inoko
- Jūkichi Uno as Tsuchiya
- Eitarō Ozawa as Takayanagi
- Ichirō Sugai as Kazama
- Chieko Higashiyama

== Awards ==
Mainichi Film Award for Best Director Keisuke Kinoshita (for Apostasy, Woman and The Portrait)
