= She Was Like a Wild Chrysanthemum =

1955 Japanese film

Japanese name
- Kanji: 野菊の如き君なりき
- Directed by: Keisuke Kinoshita
- Written by: Keisuke Kinoshota; Sachio Itō (novel)
- Starring: Chishū Ryū; Noriko Arita; Shinji Tanaka; Haruko Sugimura
- Cinematography: Hiroshi Kusuda
- Music by: Chūji Kinoshita
- Production company: Shochiku
- Distributed by: Shochiku
- Release date: 29 November 1955 (Japan)
- Running time: 92
- Country: Japan
- Language: Japanese

She Was Like a Wild Chrysanthemum (野菊の如き君なりき, Nogiku no gotoki kimi nariki), also known as You Were Like a Wild Chrysanthemum or My First Love Affair, is a 1955 Japanese drama film written and directed by Keisuke Kinoshita. It is based on a novel by Sachio Itō.

== Plot ==
73-year-old Masao is taking a river boat to pay his remote home village a visit. On his way, he reminiscences in flashbacks his youth during the Meiji era and his first great love Tamiko.

Tamiko works in the household of cousin Masao's parents. The families and the villagers are suspicious of the close, yet innocent relationship between the teenagers. While some people mock their spending time together, Tamiko's sister-in-law acts openly hostile. The contact between the two is more and more inhibited, and after Masao is sent away to a higher school in another town, Tamiko is pressured into an unwanted marriage. Tamiko first resists, but when Masao's mother declares that she will under no circumstances allow her to marry her son, she finally gives in. Omasu, the housemaid, meets Masao and gives him the news, at the same time reminding him that Tamiko will always love him. A few months later, Masao receives a telegram by his mother, asking him to come home quickly. Upon returning, he learns of Tamiko's unhappy marriage, divorce, and recent death due to an illness. The family, grieving the loss, tells Masao that the dead Tamiko held a letter from him in her hand, pressed against her heart.

Again in the present, the old Masao has reached his destination and visits Tamiko's grave, contemplating her fate with the words, "late autumn and the fields are lonesome, only crickets sing by her grave".

== Cast ==
- Chishū Ryū as Masao at 73 years
- Noriko Arita as Tamiko
- Shinji Tanaka as young Masao
- Haruko Sugimura as Masao's mother
- Takahiro Tamura as Eizo
- Toshiko Kobayashi as Omasu, the maid
- Kappei Matsumoto
- Kazuko Motohashi as Tamiko's mother
- Nobuo Takagi as Tamiko's father
- Kumeko Urabe as grandmother
- Keiko Yukishiro as Tamiko's sister-in-law

== Production ==
The flashback sequences were framed with an oval-shaped mask typically associated with silent films. According to film historian Alexander Jacoby, this masking gives the film "an appropriately nostalgic tone." Film historian Donald Richie describes this device as representing "Meiji daguerrotypes."

== Reception ==
Jacoby rated She Was Like a Wild Chrysanthemum to be "among the most purely moving of Japanese films" despite its "occasional naivety", attributing it to Kinoshota's "simple techniques," including "judicious choice of camera position," and to the excellent performances. Joseph L. Anderson also commented on the film's photography, particularly the "rich blacks", and Kinoshita's "evocation of [the] area." Richie regarded the film as "one of the most nostalgically beautiful" of the director's works. In Klinowski's and Garbicz's Feature Cinema in the 20th Century, it is described as "one of the most sincere and purest films of its type in Japanese cinema," noting that it marks a return to "pastoral lyricism" for Kinoshota after focusing his films on social issues for the previous few years.

== Awards ==
Hiroshi Kusuda received the Mainichi Film Award for Best Cinematography in 1956 for his work on She Was Like a Wild Chrysanthemum and Kinoshita's The Tattered Wings. He also received the Blue Ribbon Award for Best Cinematography for the same two films.

== Legacy ==
She Was Like a Wild Chrysanthemum was screened at the Museum of Modern Art in 1970, the Berkeley Art Museum and Pacific Film Archive in 1991, and by the Film at Lincoln Center society, New York, in 2012.
