= Woman (1948 film) =

1948 Japanese film

- Onna
- Directed by: Keisuke Kinoshita
- Written by: Keisuke Kinoshita
- Produced by: Takeshi Ogura
- Starring: Mitsuko Mito; Eitarō Ozawa
- Cinematography: Hiroyuki Kusuda
- Edited by: Yoshi Sugihara
- Music by: Chūji Kinoshita
- Production company: Shochiku
- Distributed by: Shochiku
- Release date: 2 April 1948 (Japan)
- Running time: 67 minutes
- Country: Japan
- Language: Japanese

Woman (女, Onna) is a 1948 Japanese drama film written and directed by Keisuke Kinoshita.

== Plot ==
Revue dancer Toshiko is approached by her boyfriend Tadashi, who demands that she cancels her engagements to meet him in the city of Hakone. Although weary of his ongoing criminal behaviour, she does as he tells her, but after she learns that he was involved in a burglary and the killing of a policeman, she pleas with him to leave her. Tadashi explains his conduct with his desperate situation after his return from the war, and promises to change his ways if she stays with him. Upon their arrival in Atami, Tadashi steals money from a pawn shop to pay for the passover to Hamamatsu, and Toshiko realises that his promise was a mere pretense. Toshiko, followed by Tadashi who threatens to kill her, turns to the police, who arrest Tadashi.

== Cast ==
- Mitsuko Mito as Toshiko
- Eitarō Ozawa as Tadashi

== Production, release and reception ==
Woman was shot on location in and around Atami and released on 2 April 1948.

According to an article on Kinoshita in the Mainichi Shimbun published periodical New Japan, he succeeded in combining a "lyric [sic] style with a psychological angle" with this film.

== Legacy ==
Woman was presented in 2012 by the Film at Lincoln Center society, New York, as part of its Keisuke Kinoshita retrospective, and at the 2013 Berlin International Film Festival, where it was announced as a "desperate portrait of a lethal passion against the backdrop of a Japan trying to return to some kind of normalcy", consisting of "dangerously tilted images in which everything appears to be out of balance".

== Home media ==
Woman was released on DVD in Japan in 2012 as part of the "Keisuke Kinoshita 100th birthday volume 2" DVD box.

== Awards ==
- Mainichi Film Award for Best Director Keisuke Kinoshita (for Woman, The Portrait and Apostasy)
