= Carmen's Pure Love =

1952 Japanese film

- カルメン純情す
- Directed by: Keisuke Kinoshita
- Written by: Keisuke Kinoshita
- Produced by: Takeshi Ogura
- Starring: Hideko Takamine; Toshiko Kobayashi; Chieko Higashiyama; Chikage Awashima
- Cinematography: Hiroshi Kusuda
- Edited by: Yoshi Sugihara
- Music by: Toshiro Mayuzumi; Chūji Kinoshita; Georges Bizet
- Production company: Shochiku
- Distributed by: Shochiku
- Release date: 13 November 1952 (Japan)
- Running time: 103 minutes
- Country: Japan
- Language: Japanese

Carmen's Pure Love a.k.a. Carmen Falls in Love or Carmen's Innocent Love (Japanese: カルメン純情す, romanized: Karumen junjō su) is a 1952 Japanese satirical comedy film written and directed by Keisuke Kinoshita and starring Hideko Takamine and Toshiko Kobayashi. It is a sequel to Kinoshita's 1951 comedy Carmen Comes Home.

== Plot ==
Carmen works as a strip dancer in Tokyo, appearing in a varieté version of Georges Bizet's Carmen, while her friend Akemi has been left with a baby daughter by her unfaithful left-wing activist lover. To spare the child an upbringing in precarious financial circumstances, Carmen and Akemi leave her at the doorstep of the upper-class Sudō family, but soon return in bad conscience to take her back. Carmen falls in love with Hajime, the Sudō's artist son and a notorious womaniser, taking his offer to pose nude for him as a serious interest in her. Meanwhile, Hajime's fiancée Chidori has constant arguments with her right-wing politician mother Kumako over Chidori's promiscuity.

When Carmen is fired after refusing to strip naked in front of Hajime, Chidori, and Kumako, whom she spotted in the audience, she decides to turn to "serious art" and takes ballet classes while working as an advertising girl for skin cream and rat poison. Contrary to the Sudō family's housemaid, who loses her job after confronting Kumako for her pro-rearmament politics, Hajime agrees to support his future mother-in-law's campaign out of sheer conformity. During Kumako's campaigning speech, she and Hajime are shouted at by a protester, who turns out to be the father of Akemi's child. While Akemi begs her embarrassed ex to take her back, Carmen attacks him for his unfaithfulness. In the final scene, the housemaid, now working as a shoeshiner, shakes her head over the election results she reads in a newspaper, with marching music and battlefield sounds drowning out the street noise.

== Cast ==
- Hideko Takamine as Carmen
- Toshiko Kobayashi as Akemi
- Masao Wakahara as Hajime Sudō
- Chieko Higashiyama as housemaid
- Chikage Awashima as Chidori Satake
- Eiko Miyoshi as Kumako Satake
- Tatsuo Saitō as Hajime's father
- Sachiko Murase as Hajime's mother
- Yūko Mochizuki

== Production and legacy ==
Carmen's Pure Love was Kinoshita's first film after his nine-month stay in France, where he had met his idol, director René Clair. Unlike its predecessor, Carmen Comes Home, which had been shot in colour (making it Japan's first feature length colour film), Carmen's Pure Love was shot entirely in black-and-white and made extensive use of expressionist camera angles.

Film historian Alexander Jacoby called Carmen's Pure Love an "uneasy, somewhat misanthropic satire" in contrast to the "tender humour" of its predecessor.

Donald Richie was of a different opinion: while he called Carmen Comes Home one "of the better comedies", he saw its successor as "the greatest [satire] made in Japan".

While not yet available on home media in English speaking countries, Carmen's Pure Love has been released on DVD in Japan and Austria.
