= Keisuke Kinoshita =

Japanese film director (1912–1998)

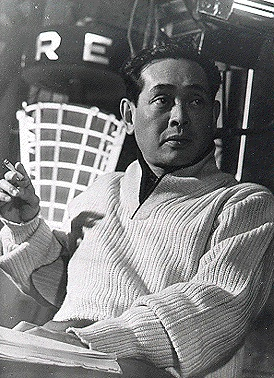
- Keisuke Kinoshita (early 1950s)
- Born: Masakichi Kinoshita; December 5, 1912; Hamamatsu, Empire of Japan
- Died: December 30, 1998 (aged 86); Tokyo, Japan
- Occupations: Film director; Screenwriter
- Years active: 1933–1944, 1946–1988
- Notable work: Carmen Comes Home (1951); A Japanese Tragedy (1953); Twenty-Four Eyes (1954); She Was Like a Wild Chrysanthemum (1955); The Ballad of Narayama (1958)
- Relatives: Chuji Kinoshita (brother); Hiroshi Kusada (brother-in-law); Yoshiko Kusuda (sister)

Keisuke Kinoshita (木下 惠介, Kinoshita Keisuke; December 5, 1912 – December 30, 1998) was a Japanese film director and screenwriter. While lesser-known internationally than contemporaries such as Akira Kurosawa, Kenji Mizoguchi and Yasujirō Ozu, he was a household figure in his home country, beloved by both critics and audiences from the 1940s to the 1960s. Kinoshita's films were marked by a sense of sentimentality, purity, and beauty, and often featured experimentation in both technique and subject matter.

Kinoshita entered the film industry in 1933 as a film processor. He moved on to the position of camera assistant, then assistant director. In 1943, Kinoshita was promoted to director and released his first film, Port of Flowers. A prolific filmmaker, Kinoshita directed 43 films in the first 23 years of his career, and then five more after a stint in television production. Among his best known films are Carmen Comes Home (1951), A Japanese Tragedy (1953), Twenty-Four Eyes (1954), She Was Like a Wild Chrysanthemum (1955) and The Ballad of Narayama (1958).

== Biography ==
=== Early years (1912–1943) ===
Keisuke Kinoshita was born Masakichi Kinoshita on December 5, 1912, in Hamamatsu, Shizuoka Prefecture, as the fourth of eight children of merchant Shūkichi Kinoshita and his wife Tama. His family manufactured pickles and owned a grocery store. A film fan already in early years, he vowed to become a filmmaker, but faced opposition from his parents. So he attended high school and began studying for college.

One day, when Kinoshita was in high school, a film crew arrived in Hamamatsu for location shooting. Amongst the crew was the actor Junosuke Bando, who Kinoshita would befriend when Bando came to the Kinoshita family's grocery store. Bando helped Kinoshita run away to Kyoto, where most period films were made, but Kinoshita's grandfather came and took Kinoshita back home the next day. Kinoshita's determination to become a filmmaker convinced his parents into letting him pursue a career in film.

Kinoshita's mother secured him an introduction to the Shochiku Kamata Studio, where Yasujiro Ozu and Mikio Naruse worked. But Kinoshita was told that he could not become an assistant director without a university education, but that he may be able to become a photographer. He applied to the Oriental Photography School, but was told that he needed at least half a year of practical experience in order to be admitted. He then worked in photography shops in Tokyo until he had enough experience to apply to the Oriental Photography School. He graduated, then was successfully admitted into Shochiku in 1933, but was told that they no longer needed camera assistants, and that he would have to work in the film processing laborator. Kinoshita was then moved to work as a camera assistant under Yasujirō Shimazu. After two years, Shimazu asked Kinoshita's superior for Kinoshita to be moved to the position of assistant director, but the request was denied. After one more year, Shimazu himself made Kinoshita his assistant director. Kinoshita credits Shimazu as his most important mentor. Kinoshita continued to work as Shimazu's assistant for six years, until Kinoshita became Kōzaburō Yoshimura's assistant. Around the time, Kinoshita began scriptwriting. In 1940, Kinoshita was drafted into the Sino-Japanese War and went to China, but returned the following year due to an injury.

=== Film career (1943–1998) ===
==== Wartime (1943-1944) ====
Kinoshita re-entered Shochiku and was promoted to director in 1943. Kinoshita's first four films were all propaganda supporting the Japanese war effort, though Kinoshita would undercut the propaganda with comedy and empathetic portrayals of ordinary people suffering because of the war. Adapting a popular play by Kazuo Kikuta, he made the comedy Port of Flowers with a large cast and budget. The same year saw the emergence of another new director, Akira Kurosawa, but it was Kinoshita who won the much coveted New Director Award at the end of that year.

In 1944, Kinoshita released his fourth film, Army. Like his previous films, Army was propaganda. Yet, the famous final scene showed a mother grieving her son's departure for the front instead of cheering him. Although it passed the censors, Kinoshita met with harsh criticism and was not allowed to direct another film until the end of the Second World War. He later argued: "I can't lie to myself in my dramas. I couldn't direct something that was like shaking hands and saying, 'Come die.'" He returned to his hometown Hamamatsu, where he waited for the war to end.

==== Post-war (1946-1998) ====
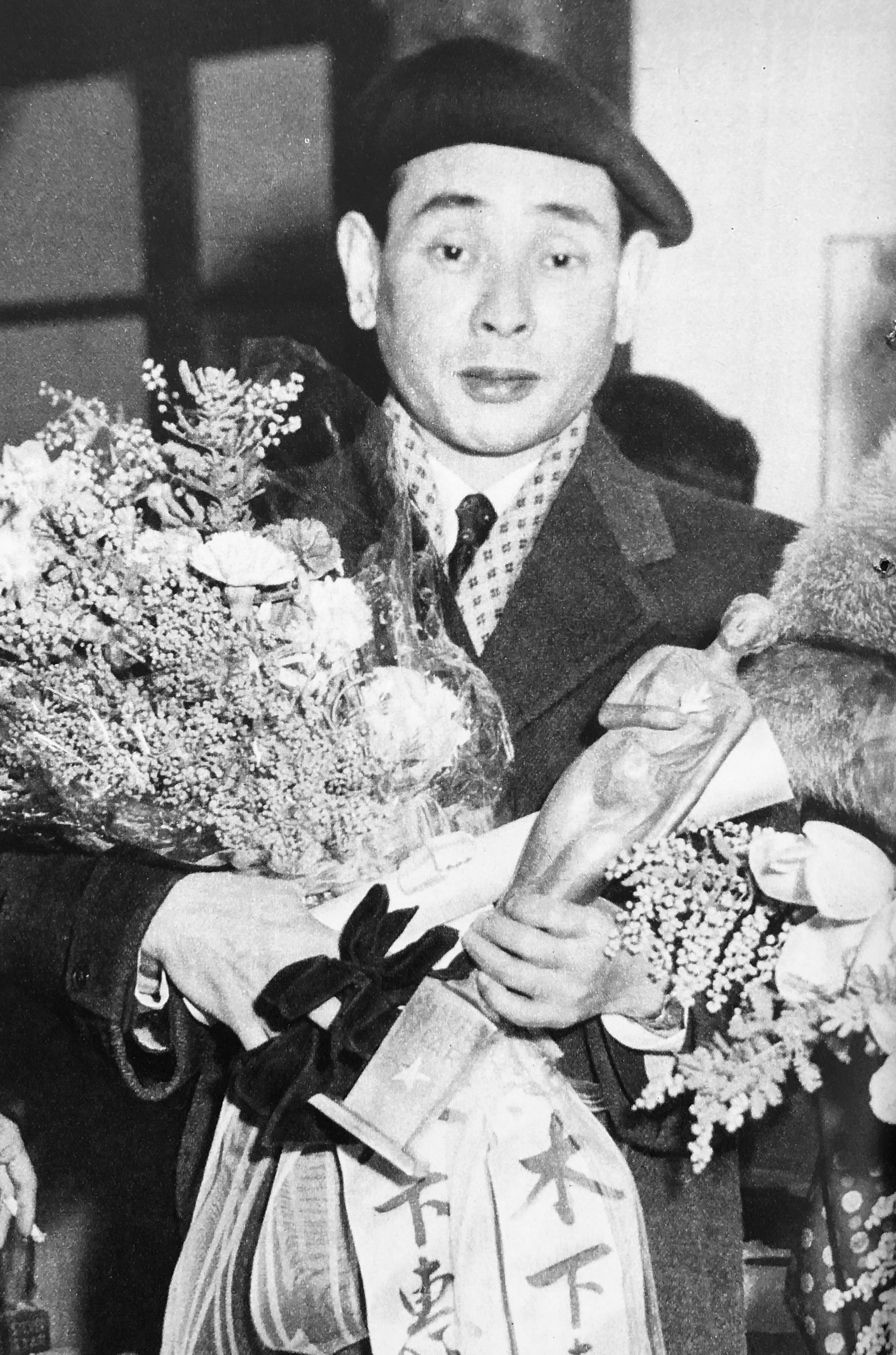
Kinoshita in 1955

Kinoshita's first post war film was Morning for the Osone Family (1946) about a family torn apart by war and conflicts between its liberal-minded and pro-militarist members. The final scene, with the remaining family greeting the rising sun, was demanded by the American censorship board against Kinoshita's objections. In the following years, he worked in a variety of genres, including comedy, period and contemporary drama, ghost story, and thriller. Starting with Phoenix in 1947, Kinoshita took on Masaki Kobayashi as an apprentice, who would continue to assist Kinoshita until 1953. In 1949, the highly successful romantic comedy Here's to the Young Lady was released, starring Setsuko Hara.

In 1951, Kinoshita travelled to France to meet his idol, French director René Clair. As Kinoshita stated, another reason for the travel was to see his home country from a different perspective. The same year saw the release of the musical comedy Carmen Comes Home, Japan's first colour feature. Due to technical and financial reasons, a black-and-white version was also filmed and released. Carmen Comes Home was the first collaboration of Kinoshita with actress Hideko Takamine, who appeared in many of his later films. Early on, Kinoshita gathered a steady group of co-workers around him: Takamine, Kinuyo Tanaka, Yoshiko Kuga, Keiji Sada and Yūko Mochizuki had repeated starring or bigger supporting roles, while his brother Chuji (also credited Tadashi) scored, and cinematographer Hiroshi Kusuda photographed many of his films. In 1953, Kinoshita wrote the script for Masaki Kobayashi's first feature length film, Sincerity. Kinoshita's sister and wife of Hiroshi Kusada, Yoshiko Kusuda, wrote the screenplay for Farewell to Dream (1956).

The mid-1950s marked the release of two of Kinoshita's most acclaimed films, Twenty-Four Eyes (1954), a portrait of a school teacher who sees the dreams of her young pupils fall apart due to economical constraints and the war, and You Were Like a Wild Chrysanthemum (1955), a Meiji era period drama about the unfulfilled love between two teenagers. Also highly popular was the lighthouse keeper drama Times of Joy and Sorrow (1957), which was repeatedly remade in later years, including one version by Kinoshita himself. The Ballad of Narayama (1958), a highly stylised period drama about the legendary ubasute practice, was entered into the 19th Venice International Film Festival, but met with very mixed reactions.

By the mid 1960s, Kinoshita had turned solely to television work. Film historian Donald Richie saw the period war drama The River Fuefuki (1960) and The Scent of Incense (1964), which follows a troubled mother-daughter-relationship over a span of four decades, as the director's last notable works. Alexander Jacoby also found the 1960 satire Spring Dreams noteworthy, which he called "quirkily enjoyable". In 1969, he along with Akira Kurosawa , Masaki Kobayashi, and Kon Ichikawa formed the Yonki-no-kai Productions company.

Like directors of the previous generation as Ozu and Naruse, Kinoshita stayed loyal to one film studio (Shochiku) before turning to television, and often worked for Shochiku even in later years, while other directors of his generation as Yoshimura and Kaneto Shindō, and even the older Heinosuke Gosho, had started working independently for different studios by the early 1950s.

Although few concrete details have emerged about Kinoshita's personal life, his homosexuality was widely known in the film world. Screenwriter and frequent collaborator Yoshio Shirasaka recalls the "brilliant scene" Kinoshita made with the handsome, well-dressed assistant directors he surrounded himself with. His 1959 film Farewell to Spring has been called "Japan's first gay film" for the emotional intensity depicted between its male characters.

Kinoshita died on December 30, 1998, of a stroke. His grave is in Engaku-ji in Kamakura, very near to that of his fellow Shochiku director, Yasujirō Ozu.

== Filmography ==
Year	English title	Japanese title	Romanized title	Director	Writer	Notes
1939	Five Siblings	五人の兄妹	Gonin no kyodai	No	Yes	
1942	The Spy Has Not Died Yet	間諜未だ死せず	Kancho mada shisezu	No	Yes	Co-written with Yoshiro Tsuji
1942	Otoko no iki	男の意気	Otoko no iki	No	Yes	Co-written with Kōzaburō Yoshimura and Noboru Nakamura
1943	Port of Flowers	花咲く港	Hana saku minato	Yes	No	
1943	The Living Magoroku	生きてゐる孫六	Ikite iru Magoroku	Yes	Yes	
1944	Jubilation Street	歓呼の町	Kanko no Machi	Yes	No	
1944	Army	陸軍	Rikugun	Yes	No	
1946	Morning for the Osone Family	大曾根家の朝	Ōsone-ke no asa	Yes	No	
1946	The Girl I Loved	わが恋せし乙女	Ikite iru Magoroku	Yes	Yes	
1947	Phoenix	不死鳥	Fushichō	Yes	Yes	
1947	Marriage	結婚	Kekkon	Yes	No	
1948	Woman	女	Onna	Yes	Yes	
1948	The Portrait	肖像	Shōzō	Yes	No	
1948	Apostasy	破戒	Hakai	Yes	No	
1949	Here’s to the Young Lady	お嬢さん乾杯!	Ojōsan kanpai!	Yes	No	
1949	The Yotsuya Ghost Story I & II	新釈四谷怪談(前後編)	Shin'yaku Yotsuya kaidan (sengo hen)	Yes	No	
1949	Broken Drum	破れ太鼓	Yabure daiko	Yes	Yes	Co-written with Masaki Kobayashi
1950	Wedding Ring	婚約指環	Kon'yaku yubiwa	Yes	Yes	
1951	The Good Fairy	善魔	Zenma	Yes	Yes	Co-written with Kogo Noda
1951	Carmen Comes Home	カルメン故郷に帰る	Karumen kokyō ni kaeru	Yes	Yes	
1951	Boyhood	少年期！	Shōnenki	Yes	Yes	Co-written with Sumie Tanaka
1951	Fireworks over the Sea	海の花火	Umi no hanabi	Yes	Yes	
1952	Carmen's Pure Love	カルメン純情す	Karumen junjōsu	Yes	Yes	
1953	Sincere Heart	まごころ	Magakoro	No	Yes	
1953	A Japanese Tragedy	日本の悲劇	Nihon no higeki	Yes	Yes	
1953	Love Letter	恋文	Koibumi	No	Yes	
1954	The Garden of Women	女の園	Onna no sono	Yes	Yes	
1954	Twenty-Four Eyes	二十四の瞳	Nijūshi no hitomi	Yes	Yes	
1955	The Tattered Wings	遠い雲	Tōi kumo	Yes	Yes	Co-written with Zenzo Matsuyama
1955	She Was Like a Wild Chrysanthemum	野菊の如き君なりき	Nogiku no gotoki kimi nariki	Yes	Yes	
1956	Ai to chie no wa	愛と智恵の輪	Ai to chie no wa	No	Yes	
1956	Farewell to Dream	夕やけ雲	Yūyake-gumo	Yes	No	
1956	The Rose on His Arm	太陽とバラ	Taiyō to bara	Yes	Yes	
1957	Times of Joy and Sorrow	喜びも悲しみも幾歳月	Yorokobi mo kanashimi mo ikutoshitsuki	Yes	Yes	
1957	Danger Stalks Near	風前の灯	Fūzen no tomoshibi	Yes	Yes	
1958	The Ballad of Narayama	楢山節考	Narayama bushi kō	Yes	Yes	
1958	The Eternal Rainbow	この天の虹	Kono ten no niji	Yes	Yes	
1959	The Snow Flurry	風花	Kazabana	Yes	Yes	
1959	Farewell to Spring	惜春鳥	Sekishunchō	Yes	Yes	
1959	Thus Another Day	今日もまたかくてありなん	Kyō mo mata kakute arinan	Yes	Yes	
1960	Spring Dreams	春の夢	Haru no yume	Yes	Yes	
1960	The River Fuefuki	笛吹川	Fuefukigawa	Yes	Yes	
1961	Immortal Love	永遠の人	Eien no hito	Yes	Yes	
1961	Don’t Ever Die, Mama!	かあちゃんしぐのいやだ	Kaa-chan shigu no iyada	No	Yes	
1962	This Year's Love	今年の恋	Kotoshi no koi	Yes	Yes	
1962	Dolls Floating Down the River	流し雛	Nagashi hina	No	Yes	
1962	Kiriko no Unmei	霧子の運命	Kiriko no unmei	No	Yes	
1962	Ballad of a Workman	二人で歩いた幾春秋	Futari de aruita ikushunjū	Yes	Yes	
1962	Children of Izu	しろばんば	Shirobanba	No	Yes	
1963	Sing, Young People!	歌え若人達	Utae wakōdotachi	Yes	No	
1963	A Legend or Was It?	死闘の伝説	Shitō no densetsu	Yes	Yes	
1964	The Scent of Incense	香華	Kōge	Yes	Yes	
1965	While Yet a Wife	妻の日の愛のかたみに		No	Yes	
1967	Green Light to Joy	父子草		No	Yes	
1967	Lovely Flute and Drum	なつかしき笛や太鼓	Natsukashiki fue ya taiko	Yes	Yes	
1976	Love and Separation in Sri Lanka	スリランカの愛と別れ	Suri Ranka no ai to wakare	Yes	Yes	
1979	Oh, My Son!	衝動殺人・息子よ	Shōdō satsujin musuko yo	Yes	Yes	Co-written with Ryōji Sunada
1980	The Young Rebels	父よ母よ!	Chichi yo, haha yo!	Yes	Yes	
1983	Children of Nagasaki	この子を残して	Kono ko o nokoshite	Yes	Yes	Co-written with Taichi Yamada
1986	Big Joys, Small Sorrows	新・喜びも悲しみも幾歳月	Shin yorokobi mo kanoshimi mo ikutoshitsuki	Yes	Yes	
1987	Children on the Island	二十四の瞳	Nijūshi no tomi	No	Yes	
1988	Father	父	Chichi	Yes	Yes	
2000	Dora-heita	どら平太	Dora-heita	No	Yes	Released posthumously. Co-written with Akira Kurosawa, Kon Ichikawa, and Masaki Kobayashi

== Style and themes ==
Kinoshita's films varied greatly in genre, but the two main veins of Kinoshita's work were comedy and melodrama, and all were marked with sentimentality and a deep sense of purity and beauty. A major theme was the depiction of national history in personal terms, chronicling families or communities over a certain span of time. Also, his films often concentrated on the sufferings of children in oppressive circumstances, and showed a general sympathy with the socially marginalised. Working less on an analytical but an intuitive level, Kinoshita's films showed, according to Alexander Jacoby, an occasional simplicity and naivety, yet in the cases of Twenty-Four Eyes and You Were Like a Wild Chrysanthemum, they were among the most purely moving of Japanese cinema. Donald Richie also pointed out the satire and comedy of character in Kinoshita's comedy films, and an emotional earnestness which exceeded sentimentality in his serious films. Sometimes critical of his later work, Richie detected an increasing traditionalism in films like The Ballad of Narayama, The River Fuefuki and Scent of Incense.

Although he often adapted literary works from writers like Tōson Shimazaki, Kunio Kishida and Isoko Hatano, many of his screenplays were based on his original idea. Kinoshita explained his prolific output with the fact that he "can't help it. Ideas for films have always just popped into my head like scraps of paper into a wastebasket." Some of his scripts were realised by other directors, including the acknowledged directorial debut of actress Kinuyo Tanaka, Love Letter (1953).

Kinoshita was also an avid stylist who experimented with cinematic form in his films. He used expressionist camera angles in Carmen's Innocent Love, daguerreotype-like framing of images in She Was Like a Wild Chrysanthemum, or partial tinting to evoke the impression of Japanese woodblock prints in The River Fuefuki. In A Japanese Tragedy, he interspersed newsreel footage, and drew upon kabuki stage effects in The Ballad of Narayama. The Snow Flurry told its story in a fragmented, nonlinear manner, preceding the New Wave.

== Legacy and cultural impact ==
Kinoshita's birth town Hamamatsu established the "Keisuke Kinoshita Memorial Museum" to commemorate him.

A retrospective on Kinoshita with 15 of his films was held at the Lincoln Center, New York, in 2012. In 2013, five of Kinoshita's films — Jubilation Street (1944), Woman (1948), Engagement Ring (1950), Farewell to Dream (1956) and A Legend or Was It? (1963) — were screened in the Forum section of the 63rd Berlin International Film Festival.

=== Reputation among filmmakers ===
In 1946, Masaki Kobayashi became Kinoshita's assistant and later formed with him, Akira Kurosawa, and Kon Ichikawa a directors group called Shiki no kai (The Four Horsemen Club). The goal was to produce films for a younger audience, but only one project was realised, Kurosawa's Dodes'ka-den (1970).

Director Tadashi Imai was an outspoken admirer of Kinoshita's work, and Nagisa Ōshima named The Garden of Women as the film which led to his decision to become a filmmaker himself in his 1995 documentary 100 Years of Japanese Cinema.

== Awards and honors ==
In 2000, Kinoshita was voted as the third favorite Japanese director of Kinema Junpo readers. Twenty-Four Eyes was voted at position #6 on the 2009 All Time Best Japanese Movies list by readers of Kinema Junpo.

Year of award or honor	Name of award or honor	Awarding organization	Country of Origin	Film title (if applicable)
1947	Best Japanese Film	Kinema Junpo	Japan	Morning for the Osone Family
1948	Best Director	Mainichi Film Awards	Japan	Apostacy; The Portrait; Woman
1951	Best Screenplay	Mainichi Film Awards	Japan	Carmen Comes Home
1953	Best Screenplay	Blue Ribbon Awards	Japan	A Japanese Tragedy
1953	Best Screenplay	Mainichi Film Awards	Japan	A Japanese Tragedy; Love Letter; Sincerity
1954	Best Film	Blue Ribbon Awards	Japan	Twenty-Four Eyes
1954	Best Screenplay	Blue Ribbon Awards	Japan	The Garden of Women; Twenty-Four Eyes
1954	Best Foreign-Language Foreign Film	Golden Globe Awards	United States	Twenty-Four Eyes
1954	Best Japanese Film	Kinema Junpo	Japan	Twenty-Four Eyes
1954	Best Film	Mainichi Film Awards	Japan	Twenty-Four Eyes
1954	Best Director	Mainichi Film Awards	Japan	The Garden of Women; Twenty-Four Eyes
1954	Best Screenplay	Mainichi Film Awards	Japan	The Garden of Women; Twenty-Four Eyes
1956	Best Foreign-Language Foreign Film	Golden Globe Awards	United States	The Rose on His Arm
1958	Best Japanese Film	Kinema Junpo	Japan	The Ballad of Narayama
1958	Best Japanese Director	Kinema Junpo	Japan	The Ballad of Narayama
1958	Best Film	Mainichi Film Awards	Japan	The Ballad of Narayama
1958	Best Director	Mainichi Film Awards	Japan	The Ballad of Narayama
1984	Order of the Rising Sun	Japanese government	Japan	
1991	Order of Culture	Japanese government	Japan	
1991	Person of Cultural Merit	Japanese government	Japan	
1999	Special Award	Blue Ribbon Awards	Japan	
1999	Special Award	Mainichi Film Awards	Japan	

== Bibliography ==
- Bock, Audie (1978). Japanese Film Directors. Kodansha. pp. 189-217. ISBN 0-87011-304-6.
