= List of Japanese child actors =

This is a list of child actors from Japan. Films and/or television series they appeared in are mentioned only if they were still a child at the time of filming.

Current child actors (under the age of eighteen) are indicated by boldface.

== A ==
- Jin Akanishi (born 1984)
  - Nekketsu Ren-ai Dou (1999)
  - P.P.O.I. (1999)
  - Kowai Nichiyōbi (1999)
  - Best Friend (1999)
  - Taiyō wa Shizumanai (2000)
  - Haregi, Koko Ichiban (2000)
  - Omae no Yukichi ga Naiteiru (2001)
- Tomio Aoki (1923–2004)
  - I Was Born, But... (1932)
  - Passing Fancy (1933)
  - An Inn in Tokyo (1935)
- Daiki Arioka (born 1991)
  - Saigo no Bengonin (1 episode, 2003)
  - Jam Films 2: Fastener (2004)
  - Engine (2005)
  - Sensei wa Erai! (2008)
  - Scrap Teacher (2008)
- Tadanobu Asano (born 1973)
  - Kinpachi-sensei (1988)
  - Bataashi kingyo (1990)
  - Aitsu (1991)
- Mana Ashida (born 2004)
  - ABC Short Movie 2: Daibokenmama (2009)
  - Ketto! Rojinto (2009)
  - Tokujo Kabachi!! (1 episode, 2010)
  - Mother (2010)
  - Hanbun no Tsuki ga Noboru Sora (2010)
  - Confessions (2010)
  - Ghost: In Your Arms Again (2010)
  - Despicable Me (Japanese voice of Agnes, 2010)
  - Aftershock (Japanese voice of young Fang Deng, 2010)
  - Hankyū Densha (2011)
  - Inu to Anata no Monogatari (2011)
  - Bunny Drop (2011)
  - Gō (2011)
  - Sayonara Bokutachi no Youchien (2011)
  - Marumo no Okite (2011)
  - Hanazakari no Kimitachi e (1 episode, 2011)
  - Kono Sekai no Katasumi ni (2011)
  - Honto ni Atta Kowai Hanashi (1 episode, 2011)
  - Marumo no Okite (1 episode, 2011)
  - Nankyoku Tairiku (2011)
  - Magic Tree House (voice, 2011)
  - Jewelpet the Movie: Sweets Dance Princess (voice, 2012)
  - The Floating Castle (2012)
  - Liar Game: Reborn (2012)
  - Alice in Liar Game (2012)
  - Beautiful Rain (2012)

== E ==
- Rina Endō (born 2005)
  - Tenchijin (2 episodes, 2009)
  - Aizen hakama you Sajijo (1 episode, 2010)
  - The Lightning Tree (2010)
  - Andalucia: Revenge of the Goddess (2011)
  - Kaze wo Atsumete (2011)
  - Don Quixote (1 episode, 2011)
  - Chouchou-san (2011)
  - Piece – Kanojo no Kioku (2012)
  - Mousou Sousa (1 episode, 2012)
  - Watashi wa Daikō-ya! Haruko no Jiken Suiri (2012)
  - Single Mothers (2012)
  - Shotenin Michiru no Minoue Banashi (1 episode, 2013)
  - Dinner (1 episode, 2013)
  - GI DREAM (2013)
  - Kamisama no Boto (1 episode, 2013)
  - Paji (2013)
  - Hakui no Namida Part 2 Jimei (2013)
  - Kiyoko Ranman (8 episodes, 2013)
  - Keiji no Manazashi (1 episode, 2013)
  - Like Father, Like Son (2013)
  - Dareka no Manazashi (voice, 2013)
  - Mushishi Tokubetsu-hen: Hihamukage (voice, 2014)
  - Mushishi Zoku-Shō (voice, 1 episode, 2014)
  - Barakamon (voice, 2014)
  - Chotto wa, Darazu ni (2014)
  - Isharyō Bengoshi (1 episode, 2014)
  - Fukuhara Keibu 5 (2014)
  - Fuyō No Hito (2014)
  - Tokyo ni Olympics o Yonda Otoko (2014)
  - Itsutsu Boshi Tourist: Saikou no Tabi, Goannai Shimasu!! (1 episode, 2015)
  - Genkai Shuraku Kabushikigaisha (1 episode, 2015)
  - Tantei no Tantei (1 episode, 2015)
  - Hotel Concierge (1 episode, 2015)
  - Jama: Shufu ga Ochita Hametsu no Michi (2015)
  - Library Wars: Book Of Memories (2015)
  - Kensatsu Jimukan Kuroyuri (2016)
  - Tabi Machi Late Show (voice, 1 episode, 2016)
  - Kiznaiver (voice, 1 episode, 2016)
  - Kamiwaza Wanda (voice, 2016)
  - Sweetness and Lightning (voice, 2016)
  - Yu-Gi-Oh!: The Dark Side of Dimensions (voice, 2016)
  - Xuan Yuan Sword Luminary (voice, 2018)
  - Okko's Inn (voice, 2018)
  - Christopher Robin (Japanese voice of Madeline Robin, 2018)
  - Dumbo (Japanese voice of Milly Farrier, 2019)
  - Dolittle (Japanese voice of Lady Rose, 2020)
  - Re-Main (voice, 2021)
  - Eureka - Eureka Seven: Hi-Evolution (voice, 2021)
  - Wednesday (Japanese voice of Wednesday Addams, 2022–present)
  - A Galaxy Next Door (voice, 2023)

== F ==
- Kyoko Fukada (born 1982)
  - Kaikyo (1997)
  - Five (1997)
  - Sore ga Kotae da! (1997)
  - News no Onna (1998)
  - Kamisama, Mō Sukoshi Dake (1998)
  - Shinjuku Shōnen Tanteidan (1998)
  - Ring 2 (1999)
  - Oni no Sumika (1999)
  - To Heart: Koishite Shinitai (1999)
  - Tengoku no Kiss (1999)
  - Imagine (2000)
  - Soshite, Tomodachi (2000)
  - Team (2000)
  - Food Fight (2000)
  - Shisha no Gakuensai (2000)

== H ==
- Ai Hashimoto (born 1996)
  - Confessions (2010)
  - Give and Go (2010)
  - Control Tower (2011)
  - A Honeymoon in Hell: Mr. & Mrs. Oki's Fabulous Trip (2011)
  - Avatar (2011)
  - The Kirishima Thing (2012)
  - Until the Break of Dawn (2012)
  - Crime and Punishment: A Falsified Romance (2012)
  - Sadako 3D (2012)
  - Home: Itoshi no Zashiki Warashi (2012)
  - Blood-C: The Last Dark (voice, 2012)
  - Soup (2012)
  - Another (2012)
  - Bungo: Stories of Desire (2012)
  - Goodbye Debussy (2013)
  - I'll Give It My All... Tomorrow (2013)
  - Angel Home (2013)
  - Hard Nuts (2013)
  - Amachan (2013)
  - All About My Siblings (2014)
  - Little Forest: Summer & Autumn (2014)
  - The World of Kanako (2014)
  - Adult Drop (2014)
  - Parasyte: Part 1 (2014)
- Rumi Hiiragi (born 1997)
  - Kayō Suspence Gekijō: Kyūkyū Shitei Byōin 3 (1995)
  - NHK asadora: Suzuran (1999)
  - BS Natsu Yasumi Tokushū Astro Fantasy: Shichiyō Bitte (1999)
  - Studio Park Kara Kon'nichiwa (1999)
  - Shichiyōtte Nan!? (1999)
  - Getsuyō Mystery Gekijō Katahira Nagisa Suspense: Card G-Men Kobayakawa Akane 1-8 (2000–2005)
  - Suzuran - Shōjo Moe no Monogatari~ (released June 17, 2000, distributed by Shochiku)
  - Spirited Away (voice, 2001)
  - Yonimo Kimyō na Monogatari: Obaa-chan (2001)
  - Netto Koshien (2002)
  - Mokuyō Drama: Dōbutsu no Oisha-san (2003)
  - Nashonaru Gekijō: Mito Kōmon 32nd season, 12th episode (2003)
  - Nice Mototeki Ongakukan (2004–2005)
  - Kinyō Jidaigeki: Hannari Kikutarō 2~Miyako Kōji Yado Jikenchō (2004)
  - Kinyō Night Drama: Sky High 2 episode 7 (2004)
  - Hontoni Atta Kowai Hanashi: Yūgure no Maigo (2004)
  - Ultra Q: dark fantasy (2004)
  - Yokohama Mystery: Akai Kutsu~Yottsu no Zō no Nazo Haha no Negai Ha Toki wo Koete (2004)
  - Yokohama Mystery: Tsurumisen Monogatari ~Tankoro Densha Ga Iku~ (2005)
  - Yokohama Mystery: Byōinsen Hikawamaru ~Senka no Roman Kōro~ (2005)
  - Yokohama Mystery: Yokohama Kokusai Minakami Kūkō ~Minami no Shima he Tonda Hikōtei (2005)
  - Kayō Suspense Gekijō: Boshi Kantei (2005)
  - Hagure Keiji Junjō ha Final Start Supesharu (2005)
  - Doyō Drama: Nobuta o Produce (2005)
  - Getsuyō Mystery Gekijō Yamamura Misa Suspense (2005)
- Ryōko Hirosue (born 1980)
  - Sashow Taeko Saigo no Jiken (1995)
  - Heart ni S (1995)
  - Konna Watashi ni Dare ga Shita (1996)
  - Maho no Kimochi / Mokuyou no Kaidan (1996)
  - Long Vacation (1996)
  - Shota no Sushi (1996)
  - 20th Century Nostalgia (1997)
  - Beach Boys (1997)
  - Boku ga Boku de Aru Tame ni (1997)
  - Seikimatsu no Uta: Konoyo no Hate de Ai o Utau Shoujo (1998)
  - Seija no Koushin (1998)
  - Sekai de Ichiban Papa ga Suki (1998)
- Takahiro Hōjō (born 1986)
  - Mayonaka wa Betsu no Kao (2002)
  - Water Boys (2003)
  - Kamen Rider Blade (2004–2005)
  - Kamen Rider Blade: Missing Ace (2004)
- Miyu Honda (born 2004)
  - I'm Mita, Your Housekeeper. (2011)
  - Wataru Seken wa Oni Bakari (2011)
  - Sayonara Bokutachi no Youchien (2011)
  - Ikemen desu ne (1 episode, 2011)
  - Marumo no Okite (8 episodes, 2011)
  - Kodomo Keisatsu (2012)
  - Summer Rescue (2012)
  - Yellow Elephant (2012)
- Maki Horikita (born 1988)
  - Dōbutsu no Oisha-san (2003)
  - Keitai Deka Zenigata Mai (2003)
  - Koi Suru Nichiyōbi (1 episode, 2003)
  - Cosmic Rescue (2003)
  - Seventh Anniversary (2003)
  - The Locker (2004)
  - The Locker 2 (2004)
  - Hirakata (2004)
  - Premonition (2004)
  - Ningen no Shōmei (2004)
  - Division 1 Houkago (2004)
  - Kaidan Shin Mimibukuro (2004)
  - Honkowa: True Horror Stories (2004)
  - Nobuta wo Produce (2005)
  - Akechi Kogoro VS Kindaichi Kosuke (2005)
  - Densha Otoko (2005)
  - Hinokio: Inter Galactic Love (2005)
  - Always: Sunset on Third Street (2005)
  - The Deep Red (2005)
  - Gyakkyou Nine (2005)
  - Mobile Detective: The Movie (2006)
  - Haru no Ibasho (2006)
  - Trick: The Movie 2 (2006)
  - One Missed Call: Final (2006)
  - Kurosagi (2006)
  - Tsubasa no Oreta Tenshitachi (2006)
  - Honkowa: True Horror Stories: Summer 2006 (2006)
  - Densha Otoko Deluxe (2006)
  - Teppan Shoujo Akane!! (2006)

== I ==
- Yui Ichikawa (born 1986)
  - Ju-on: The Grudge (2002)
  - Jikuu Keisatsu Wecker D-02 (2002)
  - Gokusen (2002)
  - Taiho Shichauzo (2002)
  - Ju-on: The Grudge 2 (2003)
  - Hotman (2003)
  - Ruton no Ouhi, Saigo no Koutei (2003)
  - Yankee Bokou ni kaeru (2003)
  - Hotman '04 Spring Special (2004)
  - Tenkokuhe no Ouenka (2004)
  - Wonderful Life (2004)
  - Hotman 2 (2004)
  - Zebraman (2004)
- Riho Iida (born 1991)
  - Tensai Terebukun Wide (1999–2003)
  - *Oyajii (2000)
  - Hyakunen no Monogatari (2000)
  - Hitorine (2001)
  - Zukkoke Trio 3 (1 episode, 2001)
  - Ougon no Inu (2001)
  - Wagamanma Kitchin (2001–2002)
  - Shougaiken Gibu no okurimono (2002)
  - Tensai Terebi Kun MAX (2002)
  - Seirei nagashi (2003)
  - Okusama A (2003)
  - Musashi (2003)
  - Tensai TV kun MAX (2003–2011)
  - Photo Frame (2004)
  - Sexy voice and Robo (2007)
  - Tantei Gakuen Q (1 episode, 2007)
- Sosuke Ikematsu (born 1990)
  - The Last Samurai (2003)
  - Tetsujin 28: The Movie (2005)
  - Yoshitsune (2005)
  - Yamato (2005)
  - Udon (2006)
  - Yoru no Pikunikku (2006)
  - Shinsengumi!! Hijikata Toshizō Saigo no Ichi-nichi (2006)
  - Genghis Khan: To the Ends of the Earth and Sea (2007)
  - Fūrin Kazan (2007)
  - Sand Chronicles (2008)
  - Dive!! (2008)
- Miyu Irino (born 1988)
  - Pretty Soldier Sailor Moon SuperS (1995)
  - You're Under Arrest (1996)
  - Ultraman Gaia: The Battle in Hyperspace (1998)
  - Spirited Away (2001)
  - PaRappa the Rapper (2001)
  - Cromartie High School (2003)
  - D.N.Angel (2003)
  - Wolf's Rain (2003)
  - Fafner in the Azure (2004)
  - Kurau Phantom Memory (2004)
  - Madlax (2004)
  - Windy Tales (2004)
  - Zipang (2004)
  - Tsubasa Chronicle the Movie: The Princess of the Country of Birdcages (2005)
  - Eyeshield 21 (2005)
  - Starship Operators (2005)
  - xxxHOLiC the Movie: A Midsummer Night's Dream (2005)
  - Tsubasa Reservoir Chronicles (2005)
  - Air Gear (2006)
  - D. Gray-man (2006)
  - Legend of Raoh: Chapter of Fierce Fight (2006)
  - Futari wa Pretty Cure Splash Star (2006)
  - Gin'iro no Olynssis (2006)
  - Yomigaeru Sora - Rescue Wings (2006)
- Takahiro Itō (1987–2009)
  - Jack the Bear (Japanese voice of Dylan Leary, 1993)
  - Teenage Mutant Ninja Turtles III (Japanese voice of Yoshi, 1993)
  - Lost in Space (Japanese voice of Will Robinson, 1998)
  - Andromedia (1998)
  - Mentors (Japanese voice of Oliver Cates, 1998–2002)
  - Boogiepop Phantom (voice, 2000)
  - Train Man (2005)

== K ==
- Ai Kago (born 1988)
  - Pinch Runner (cameo, 2000)
  - Mini-Moni Yaru no da Pyon! (voice, 2001)
  - Angel Hearts (2002)
  - Kochira Hon Ikegami Sho (2002)
  - Kochira Hon Ikegami Sho 2 (2003)
  - Mini-Moni the TV (voice, 2003)
  - Kochira Hon Ikegami Sho 3 (2004)
  - Kochira Hon Ikegami Sho 4 (2004)
  - Mini Moni's Town Musicians of Bremen (2004)
  - Kochira Hon Ikegami Sho 5 (2005)
- Kanon Kasuga (born 2003)
  - Hataraki Man (2007)
  - Shōkōjo Seira (2009)
  - Natsu no Koi wa Nijiiro ni Kagayaku (2010)
  - Deka Wanko (1 episode, 2011)
  - Namae o Nakushita Megami (2011)
  - Nankyoku tairiku: Kami no ryouiki ni idonda otoko to inu no monogatari (5 episodes, 2011)
  - Jiko - kuroi gashû (2012)
  - Saikou no omotenashi (2014)
  - Arashi no namida: Watashitachi ni ashita wa aru (7 episodes, 2016)
- Seishiro Kato (born 2001)
  - My Magician (1 episode, 2003)
  - Manhattan Love Story (3 episodes, 2003)
  - Batsu Kare (2004)
  - The Boy Who Became a Star (2005)
  - Sukiyaki - Kyu Sakamoto Story (2005)
  - Boogie-woogie of Love and Friendship (2005)
  - Ultraman Mebius (1 episode, 2006)
  - Yumeji Night Shakespeare Drama Special "Romeo and Juliet" (2007)
  - The Summer You Gave Me - You Can Be Happy, If You Try Hard (2007)
  - Fūrin Kazan (5 episodes, 2007)
  - Five (2008)
  - Saito-san (2008)
  - Thanks, Mom (2008)
  - Oh! My Girl!! (2008)
  - Kaidan Shin Mimibukuro Special "Gii" (2008)
  - Ai no Gekijō - Straight to Remarriage! (2008)
  - Ai no Gekijō - We Love Quintuplets! (2008)
  - Tenchijin (3 episodes, 2009)
  - I Won't Cry (2009)
  - Uta no Oniisan (3 episodes, 2009)
  - Tōkyō Shōjo Mano Erina (2009)
  - Ninkyō Helper (2009)
  - Zatoichi: The Last (2010)
  - You Are Umasou (2010)
  - Yamato Nadeshiko Shichi Henge (2010)
  - Jūichi-nin mo Iru! (2011)
  - Ninja Kids!!! (2011)
  - Friends: Mononoke Shima no Naki (voice, 2011)
  - Honjitsu wa Taian nari (2012)
  - Ai to makoto (2012)
  - Tôi yakusoku - hoshi ni natta kodomotachi (2014)
  - Howaito rabo: Keishichou tokubetsu kagaku sousahan (1 episode, 2014)
  - Assassination Classroom (2015)
  - Assassination Classroom: Graduation (2016)
  - Seirei no moribito (4 episodes, 2016)
  - Kuhana! (2016)
  - Bôkyô (2016)
  - Our House (2016)
  - Hakubo (voice, 2019)
- Haruna Kawaguchi (born 1995)
  - Tokyo Dogs (2009)
  - Don't Cry Anymore (2010)
  - Hatsukoi Chronicle (2010)
  - Bad Boy and Good Girl (2010)
  - Zettai Nakanai to Kimeta Hi: Emergency Special (2010)
  - Nagareboshi (2010)
  - Ouran High School Host Club (2011)
  - Moshidora (2011)
  - POV: Norowareta Film (2012)
  - Ouran High School Host Club (2012)
  - Shirato Osamu no Jikenbo (1 episode, 2012)
  - Hōkago wa Mystery to Tomoni (2012)
  - GTO (2012)
  - GTO: Demon Rampage in Autumn Special (2012)
  - GTO: New Year's Special! (2013)
  - GTO: Conclusion -Graduation Special (2013)
  - The Kindaichi Case Files: Hong Kong Murder Case (2013)
  - 3-in-1 House Share (8 episodes, 2013)
  - Galileo (1 episode, 2013)
  - Ghost Negotiator Tenma (2013)
  - Husband’s Lover (2013)
  - The Last Chance: Diary of Comedians (2013)
  - The Apology King (2013)
  - Zekkyō Gakkyū (2013)
  - Madam Marmalade no Ijō na Nazo: Question (2013)
  - Madam Marmalade no Ijō na Nazo: Answer (2013)
- Kie Kitano (born 1991)
  - Beat Crusaders – I Can See Clearly Now (music video, 2005)
  - Mother at Fourteen (2006)
  - Junjo Kirari (2006)
  - Yubisaki kara Sekai wo (2006)
  - Kofuku no Shokutaku (2007)
  - Little – Yume no Sei (music video, 2007)
  - Speed Master (2007)
  - Life (2007)
  - Spider-Man 3 (Japanese voice of Mary Jane Watson, 2007)
  - GeGeGe no Kitaro Sennen Noroi Uta (2008)
  - Love Fight (2008)
  - Postman (2008)
  - Funky Monkey Babys – Kibō no Uta/Kaze (music video, 2008)
  - Taiyo to Umi no Kyoshitsu (2008)
  - Half Way (2009)
  - Pokémon: Arceus and the Jewel of Life (voice, 2009)
- Ayame Koike (born 1995)
  - Always Zoku Sanchōme no Yūhi (2007)
  - Sakuran (2007)
  - Into the White Night (2011)
- Seiran Kobayashi (born 2004)
  - Natsu no Koi wa Nijiiro ni Kagayaku (2010)
  - You can Dance, Natsu (2010)
  - Sotsu Uta (2010)
  - Yōkame no Semi (2010)
  - Rikon Syndrome (2010)
  - Asu mo Mata Ikite Ikō (2010)
  - Control: Hanzai Shinri Sōsa (2011)
  - Wataru Seken wa Oni Bakari (2011)
  - Namae o Nakushita Megami (2011)
  - Mi o Tsukushi Ryōrichō (2012)
  - Ikkyu-san (2012)
  - Spotlight (2012)
  - Paji (2013)
  - Ikkyu-san 2 (2013)
  - Gekiryu: Watashi wo Oboete Imasuka? (2013)
  - Space Dandy (voice, 2014)
  - Peter no Soretsu (2014)
  - Shuriken Sentai Ninninger (2015)
  - The Peanuts Movie (Japanese voice of Sally Brown, 2015)
  - Waka okami wa shôgakusei! (voice, 2018)
  - Okko's Inn (voice, 2018)
  - Chuzai Keiji (2018–2022)
  - The Lion King (Japanese voice of Young Nala, 2019)
  - Kansatsui Asagao (1 episode, 2019)
  - My Hero Academia (voice, 17 episodes, 2019–2022)
  - Eiga Healin' Good Precure: Yume no Machi de Kyun! Tto Go Go! Dai Henshin!! (voice, 2021)
  - Star Wars: Visions (voice, 1 episode, 2021)
  - I'm Standing on a Million Lives (voice, 1 episode, 2021)
  - The Tunnel to Summer, the Exit of Goodbyes (voice, 2022)
- Fuka Koshiba (born 1997)
  - Iki mo Dekinai Natsu (2012)
  - Skate Kutsu no Yakusoku: Nagoya Joshi Figure Monogatari (2013)
  - Great Teacher Onizuka (2014)
  - Kiki's Delivery Service (2014)
  - Girls Step (2015)
- Minako Kotobuki (born 1991)
  - Hibi (2005)
  - Ghost of Yesterday (2006)
  - Koufuku no Switch (2006)
  - Hinami (2006)
  - Red Garden (voice, 2006)
  - Kamichama Karin (voice, 2007)
  - Kyōran Kazoku Nikki (voice, 2008)
  - Birdy the Mighty: Decode (voice, 2008)
  - Bluebird (2008)
  - -x- (Minus Kakeru Minus) (2008)
  - Redline (voice, 2009)
  - First Love Limited (voice, 2009)
  - Umi Monogatari: Anata ga Ite Kureta Koto (voice, 2009)
  - K-On! (voice, 2009)
  - A Certain Scientific Railgun (voice, 2009)
  - Yoku Wakaru Gendai Mahō (voice, 2009)
  - Guin Saga (voice, 2009)
  - Birdy the Mighty: Decode 02 (voice, 2009)
  - Hell Girl: Triangle (voice, 2009)
  - Sora no Manimani (voice, 2009)
  - Heaven's Lost Property (voice, 2009)
- Yoshiko Kuga (1931–2024)
  - Drunken Angel (1948)

== M ==
- Tamaki Matsumoto (born 1999)
  - Honto ni atta kowai hanashi (1 episode, 2004)
  - Shinsengumi! (3 episodes, 2004)
  - Toppu kyasutâ (3 episodes, 2006)
  - Re mizeraburu: shoujo kozetto (voice, 2007)
  - Operation Love (2 episodes, 2007)
  - Les Misérables: Shōjo Cosette (voice, 2007)
  - Summer Days with Coo (voice, 2007)
  - Doraemon the Movie: Nobita's New Great Adventure into the Underworld (voice, 2007)
  - Kamen Rider Den-O (17 episodes, 2007–2008)
  - Doraemon: Nobita and the Green Giant Legend (voice, 2008)
  - Code Geass: Lelouch of the Rebellion (voice, 3 episodes, 2008)
  - 20th Century Boys 1: Beginning of the End (2008)
  - Daisuki!! (2 episodes, 2008)
  - Kamen Rider Den-O & Kiva: Climax Deka (2008)
  - Saraba Kamen Rider Den-O: Final Countdown (2008)
  - 20th Century Boys 2: The Last Hope (2009)
  - 20th Century Boys 3: Redemption (2009)
  - Cho Kamen Rider Den-O & Decade Neo Generations: The Onigashima Warship (2009)
  - Up (Japanese voice of Young Ellie, 2009)
  - Kamen Rider Decade (3 episodes, 2009)
  - Oblivion Island: Haruka and the Magic Mirror (voice, 2009)
  - Kamen Rider × Kamen Rider × Kamen Rider The Movie: Cho-Den-O Trilogy (2010)
  - Keroro Gunso the Super Movie: Creation! Ultimate Keroro, Wonder Space-Time Island (2010)
  - Welcome to the Space Show (voice, 2010)
  - Ryômaden (7 episodes, 2010)
- Hibari Misora (1937–1989)
  - Nodo jimankyō jidai (1949)
  - Shin-Tokyo ondo: bikkuri gonin otoko (1949)
  - Odoru ryū kyūjō (1949)
  - Akireta musume-tachi (1949)
  - The Sad Whistle (1949)
  - Odoroki ikka (1949)
  - Home run kyō jidai (1949)
  - Hit Parade (1950)
  - Akogare no Hawaii Kōro (1950)
  - Mukō sangen ryōdonari continued: 3rd Story - donguri utagassen (1950)
  - Hōrō no utahime (1950)
  - Mukō sangen ryōdonari continued: 4th Story - koi no mikeneko (1950)
  - Enoken no sokonuke daihōsō (1950)
  - Sakon torimonochō: senketsu no tegata (1950)
  - Tokyo Kid (1950)
  - Ōgon Batto: Matenrō no kaijin (1950)
  - Tonbo kaeri dōchū (1950)
  - Chichi koishi (1951)
  - Uta matsuri: Hibari shichi henge (1951)
  - Naki nureta ningyō (1951)
  - Hibari no komoriuta (1951)
  - Ano oka koete (1951)
  - Haha wo shitaite (1951)
  - Yōki-na wataridori (1952)
  - Kurama tengu: Tengu kaijō (1952)
  - Tsukigata Hanpeita (1952)
  - Futari no hitomi (1952)
  - Ringo-en no shōjo (1952)
  - Ushiwakamaru (1952)
  - Hibari-hime hatsuyume dōchū (1952)
  - Mita katakure! (1953)
  - Hibari no utau tamatebako (1953)
  - Hibari no yōki-na tenshi (1953)
  - Hibari torimonochō: Utamatsuri happyaku yachō (1953)
  - Hibari no kanashiki hitomi (1953)
  - Yama wo mamoru kyōdai (1953)
  - Shimai (1953)
  - Ojōsan shachō (1953)
  - Misora Hibari no haru ha uta kara (1954)
  - Hiyodori sōshi (1954)
  - The Dancing Girl of Izu (1954)
  - Uta shigure oshidori wakashū (1954)
  - Seishun romance seat: Aozora ni owasu (1954)
  - Yaoya Oshichi furisode tsukiyo (1954)
  - Bikkuri gojūsantsugi (1954)
  - Wakaki hi wa kanashi (1954)
  - Uta goyomi Onatsu Seijūrō (1954)
  - Shichihenge tanuki goten (1954)
  - Ōedo senryōbayashi (1955)
  - Furisode kyōenroku (1955)
  - Musume sendōsan (1955)
  - Seishun kōro: Umi no wakōdo (1955)
  - Uta matsuri mangetsu tanuki-gassen (1955)
  - Takekurabe (1955)
  - So Young, So Bright (1955)
  - Furisode kotengu (1955)
  - Fuefuki Wakamusha (1955)
  - Utamatsuri Edokko Kin-san torimonochō (1955)
  - Rikidōzan monogatari dotō no otoko (1955)
  - Hatamoto taikutsu otoko: nazo no kettōjō (1955)
  - Utae! Seishun Harikiri Musume (1955)
- Haruma Miura (1990–2020)
  - Agri (1997)
  - Nile (1999)
  - Jubaku: Spellbound (1999)
  - Manatsu no Merry Christmas (2000)
  - Fujisawa Shuhei no Ninjū Shigure Machi 3: Jidaigeki Roman (2001)
  - Thousand Years of Love – The Tale of Shining Genji (2001)
  - Mori no Gakkō (2002)
  - Musashi (2003)
  - Division 1 Aozora Koi Hoshi (1 episode, 2005)
  - Fight (2005)
  - Ima, Ai ni Yukimasu (2005)
  - Akihabara@Deep (2006)
  - Catch a Wave (2006)
  - Mother at Fourteen (2006)
  - Unfair (2006)
  - Kōmyō ga Tsuji (2006)
  - Children (2006)
  - Greeeen – "Be Free" (music video, 2007)
  - Koizora (2007)
  - Negative Happy Chainsaw Edge (2007)
  - Naoko (2008)
  - Bloody Monday (2008)
  - Binbō Danshi (2008)
  - Galileo (1 episode, 2008)
  - Gokusen (2008)
  - Yuzu – "Umaku Ienai" (music video, 2008)
- Karen Miyama (born 1996)
  - Shiawase no Shippo (1 episode, 2002)
  - Yoiko no Mikata (1 episode, 2003)
  - Ashitatenkinināre (1 episode, 2003)
  - Be with You (2004)
  - Naruto the Movie: Ninja Clash in the Land of Snow (voice, 2004)
  - Boku to Kanojo to Kanojo no Ikiru Michi (2004)
  - Big Money - Ukiyo no sata wa kabu shidai (1 episode, 2004)
  - Gekai Hatomura Shugoro Yami no Chart (2004–2016)
  - Za Kaigo Bancho (2005)
  - Junjo Kirari (2006)
  - Gakincho (2006)
  - Chibi Maruko-chan (2006)
  - Sand Chronicles (2007)
  - Mop Girl (1 episode, 2007)
  - Swan no Baka (2007)
  - Cat Street (2008)
  - Romes: kūkō bōgyo shisutemu (2009)
  - IRIS (4 episodes, 2009)
  - Mioka (2010)
  - Guilty Akuma to Keiyakushita Onna (2 episodes, 2010)
  - Stosugyo Homerun (2011)
  - Furusato ~Musume no Tabidachi~ (2011)
  - Shinomachi Rocket (2011)
  - Iris: The Last (2011)
  - A Letter to Momo (voice, 2011)
  - Rock: Wanko no Shima (2011)
  - Koko Nyushi (2012)
  - Suzuko no Koi (2 episodes, 2012)
  - Discover Dead (1 episode, 2013)
  - Kamo, Kyoto e Iku (1 episode, 2013)
  - Ko Kyōto renzoku satsujin jiken × gekaihatomurashūgorō (2013)
  - Yamada-kun and the Seven Witches (2013)
  - Bandits vs. Samurai Squadron (1 episode, 2013)
  - Saitama Kazoku Hakabanoto (2013)
  - Blossoms Bloom (2014)
  - Gekijōban Zero (2014)
  - Suiyo Mystery 9: Tsumi Hi (2014)
- Rie Miyazawa (born 1973)
  - Seven Days' War (1988)
  - Who Do I Choose? (1989)
  - Kasuga no Tsubone (1989)
  - Taiheiki (1991)
- Ayaka Miyoshi (born 1996)
  - Otoko no Kosodate (2007)
  - Yume no Mitsuke Kata Oshietaru! (2008)
  - Pocky 4 Sisters! (2008)
  - Utatama (2008)
  - Shinizokonai no Ao (2008)
  - Yūkai Kidnapping (2009)
  - Solo Contest (2009)
  - Atami no Sōsakan (2010)
  - Your Story (2010)
  - Confessions (2010)
  - Kokosei Restaurant (2011)
  - Taisetsu na Koto wa Subete Kimi ga Oshiete Kureta (2011)
  - Higashino Keigo Mysteries (2012)
  - Perfect Son (2012)
  - Kekkon Shinai (2012)
  - G'mor Evian! (2012)
  - Leaving on the 15th Spring (2013)
  - Kindaichi Shōnen no Jikenbo Gokumon Juku Satsujin Jiken (2014)
  - Lost Days (2014)
  - GTO: Great Teacher Onizuka (2014)
- Suzuka Morita (born 1992)
  - Kamen Rider Decade (2009)
  - Samurai Sentai Shinkenger The Movie: The Fateful War (2009)
  - Samurai Sentai Shinkenger (2009–2010)
  - Samurai Sentai Shinkenger vs. Go-onger: GinmakuBang!! (2010)
  - Mutant Girls Squad (2010)
  - Come Back! Samurai Sentai Shinkenger (2010)
- Sumire Morohoshi (born 1999)
  - Nanny McPhee (Japanese voice of Agatha "Aggie" Brown, 2005)
  - Final Fantasy VII: Advent Children (voice, 2005)
  - Red Garden (voice, 2006)
  - Monster House (Japanese voice of Eliza, 2006)
  - Leroy & Stitch (Japanese voice of Lilo Pelekai, 2006)
  - Bambi II (Japanese voice of Thumper's Sister, 2006)
  - The Fall (Japanese voice of Alexandria, 2006)
  - Spider-Man 3 (Japanese voice of Penny Marko, 2007)
  - Surf's Up (Japanese voice of Kate, 2007)
  - War (Japanese voice of Ana Chang, 2007)
  - Secrets of the Furious Five (Japanese voice of Nerdy Bunny, 2008)
  - The Curious Case of Benjamin Button (Japanese voice of 7-year-old Daisy Fuller, 2008)
  - Bedtime Stories (Japanese voice of Bobbi Bronson, 2008)
  - Brothers (Japanese voice of Isabelle Cahill, 2009)
  - Corpse Princess: Kuro (voice, 2009)
  - Fullmetal Alchemist: Brotherhood (voice, 3 episodes, 2009)
  - Professor Layton and the Eternal Diva (voice, 2009)
  - Summer Wars (voice, 2009)
  - Old Dogs (Japanese voice of Emily Greer, 2009)
  - 2012 (Japanese voice of Lilly Curtis, 2009)
  - A Christmas Carol (Japanese voice of Belle, 2009)
  - The Princess and the Frog (Japanese voice of Young Charlotte "Lottie" La Bouff, 2009)
  - Toy Story 3 (Japanese voice of Bonnie Anderson, 2010)
  - Tangled (Japanese voice of Young Rapunzel, 2010)
  - Legend of the Guardians: The Owls of Ga'Hoole (Japanese voice of Eglantine, 2010)
  - Inception (Japanese voice of 5-year-old Phillipa Cobb, 2010)
  - Fafner: Dead Agressor: Heaven and Earth (voice, 2010)
  - Hutch the Honeybee (voice, 2010)
  - Princess Jellyfish (voice, 2 episodes, 2010)
  - Maid Sama! (voice, 4 episodes, 2010)
  - Heroman (voice, 2010)
  - Rainbow: Nisha Rokubō no Shichinin (voice, 2010)
  - Harry Potter and the Deathly Hallows – Part 2 (Japanese voice of Young Petunia Dursley, 2011)
  - Spy Kids: All the Time in the World (Japanese voice of Rebecca Wilson, 2011)
  - Hawaiian Vacation (Japanese voice of Bonnie Anderson, 2011)
  - Small Fry (Japanese voice of Bonnie Anderson, 2011)
  - The Sound of Music (Japanese voice of Marta von Trapp in the TV Tokyo edition, 2011)
  - Blue Exorcist (voice, 1 episode, 2011)
  - Stitch! (voice, 1 episode, 2011)
  - No. 6 (voice, 6 episodes, 2011)
  - Izakaya Moheji (2011)
  - The Princess and the Pilot (voice, 2011)
  - Friends: Mononoke Shima no Naki (voice, 2011)
  - Dark Shadows (Japanese voice of Young Victoria Winters, 2012)
  - Partysaurus Rex (Japanese voice of Bonnie Anderson, 2012)
  - Wreck-It Ralph (Japanese voice of Vanellope von Schweetz, 2012)
  - OniAi (voice, 2012)
  - Aikatsu! (voice, 152 episodes, 2012–2015)
  - The Ambition of Oda Nobuna (voice, 3 episodes, 2012)
  - Yu-Gi-Oh! Zexal (voice, 2012)
  - Beyblade: Shogun Steel (voice, 2012–2013)
  - Percy Jackson: Sea of Monsters (Japanese voice of Young Thalia Grace, 2013)
  - Izakaya Moheji 2 (2013)
  - Pokémon the Movie: Genesect and the Legend Awakened (voice, 2013)
  - Toy Story of Terror! (Japanese voice of Bonnie Anderson, 2013)
  - The Croods (Japanese voice of Sandy Crood, 2013)
  - Frozen (Japanese voice of 9-year-old Anna, 2013)
  - Yoyo and Nene, the Little Witch Sisters (voice, 2013)
  - GJ Club (voice, 2013)
  - My Teen Romantic Comedy SNAFU (voice, 4 episodes, 2013–2015)
  - Gaist Crusher (voice, 4 episodes, 2014)
  - Izakaya Moheji 3 (2014)
  - Tokyo Ghoul (voice, 6 episodes, 2014)
  - Aikatsu! The Movie (voice, 2014)
  - When Supernatural Battles Became Commonplace (voice, 2014)
  - Saint Seiya: Legend of Sanctuary (voice, 2014)
  - Interstellar (Japanese voice of Young Murphy "Murph" Cooper, 2014)
  - Dragon Collection (voice, 2014–2015)
  - The Boy and the Beast (voice, 2015)
  - Meiji Tokyo Renka the Movie: Serenade of the Crescent Moon (voice, 2015)
  - Psycho-Pass: The Movie (voice, 2015)
  - Izakaya Moheji 4 (2015)
  - Jewelpet: Magical Change (voice, 2015)
  - Haikyū!! 2 (voice, 2015)
  - Fafner in the Azure: -EXODUS- (voice, 2015)
  - Tokyo Ghoul √A (voice, 2015)
  - PriPara (voice, 2015)
  - Fate/kaleid liner Prisma Illya 3rei! (voice, 1 episode, 2016)
  - Aikatsu Stars! (voice, 2016)
  - Aikatsu Stars! The Movie (voice, 2016)
  - Kaze no Matasaburō (voice, 2016)
  - Fairy Tail Zero (voice, 2016)
  - Haikyū!! Karasuno High School vs Shiratorizawa Academy (voice, 2016)
  - Bungo Stray Dogs (voice, 2016)
  - Meiji Tokyo Renka the Movie: Fantasia of the Flower Mirror (voice, 2016)
  - Little Witch Academia (voice, 1 episode, 2017)
  - Welcome to the Ballroom (voice, 2017)
  - Hand Shakers (voice, 2017)
  - Rage of Bahamut: Virgin Soul (voice, 2017)
  - Haikyu!! 3: Genius and Sense (voice, 2017)
  - Haikyu!! 4: Battle of Concepts (voice, 2017)
  - Gabriel DropOut (voice, 2017)
  - Inuyashiki (voice, 2017)
  - Restaurant to Another World (voice, 2017)

== N ==
- Yukie Nakama (born 1979)
  - Tomoko no Baai (1996)
  - Mō gaman Dekinai (1996)
  - Itazura na Kiss (1996)
  - Mokuyō no Kaidan 15 (1997)
  - Odoru Daisōsasen Saimatsu Tokubetsu Keikai (1997)
  - Shiawase Iro Shashinkan (1997)
  - Dangerous Angel x Death Hunter (1 episode, 1997)
  - Haunted Junction (voice, 1997)
- Terumi Niki (born 1949)
  - Keisatsu Nikki (1955)
  - Ryūri no Kishi (1956)
  - The Diary of Anne Frank (Japanese voice of Anne Frank)
  - Enraptured (1961)
  - Taikōki (1965)
  - Red Beard (1965)

== O ==
- Nozomi Ōhashi (born 1999)
  - Ningen no Shomei (2004)
  - Yonimo Kimyona Monogatari Anata no Monogatari (2005)
  - All About My Dog (2005)
  - Luna-Heights (2005)
  - Luna-Heights 2 (2006)
  - Tsubasa no Oreta Tenshitachi Slot (2006)
  - Kinyo Entertainment (2006)
  - Juken Sentai Gekiranger (1 episode, 2007)
  - Ponyo on the Cliff by the Sea (voice, 2008)
  - Advertisement for Mitsuya Cider (2008)
  - Shiroi Haru (2009)
  - A Happy Birthday (2009)
  - Detective Conan: The Lost Ship in the Sky (voice, 2010)
  - Veterinarian Dolittle (2010)
  - Don Quixote (2011)
- Suzuka Ohgo (born 1993)
  - Gokusen (2002)
  - Hito ni Yasashiku (2002)
  - Dr. Coto's Clinic (2003–2004)
  - Ai no Ie (2003)
  - Ultraman Cosmos vs. Ultraman Justice: The Final Battle (2003)
  - Dr. Kotō: Shinryojō 2004 (2004)
  - Aikurushī (2005)
  - Kita No Zeronen (2005)
  - Memoirs of a Geisha (2005)
  - Shibō Suitei Jikoku (2006)
  - Dr. Kotō: Shinryojō 2006 (2006)
  - Baruto no Gakuen (2006)
  - Tōku no Sora ni Kieta (2007)
  - Sexy Voice and Robo (2007)
  - Galileo (2007)
  - Churaumi Karano Nengajyou (2007)
  - Michiko to Hatchin (voice, 2008)
  - Hitomi (2008)
  - Kamui Gaiden (2008)
  - Guu-Guu Datte Neko de Aru (2008)
  - Shibatora (2008)
  - Samurai High School (2009)
- Natsuki Okamoto (born 1989)
  - Aoi uta - Nodo jiman Seishun hen (2006)
  - Warau Mikaeru (2006)
- Megumi Okina (born 1979)
  - Fireworks, Should We See It from the Side or the Bottom? (1993)
  - Kinjirareta Asobi (1995)
  - Naito heddo (1995)
  - Wakaba no Koro (1996)
  - Kimi ga Jinsei no Toki (1997)
  - Futari (1997)
  - Shinryonaikai Ryoko (1997)
- Machiko Ono (born 1981)
  - Suzaku (1997)
- Rikiya Otaka (born 1991)
  - Dear Woman (1996)
  - Beach Boys (1 episode, 1997)
  - Ai to Kandō no Jitsuwa: Sayonara Mōdōken Berna (1998)
  - Ring (1998)
  - Ring 2 (1999)
  - Sleeping Bride (2000)
  - Aoi (2000)
  - Nagoya Senkyaku Banrai (2000)
  - Black Jack 2: Tensai Joi no Wedding Dress (2000)
  - Kamen Rider Agito the Movie: Project G4 (2001)
  - Tasogare Ryūseigun: Dōsōkai Seidan (2002)
  - The Sea Is Watching (2002)
  - Baseball Kids (2003)
  - Life is Journey (2003)
  - Catharsis (2003)
  - The Boat to Heaven (2003)
  - Musashi (2003)
  - Kunimitsu no Matsuri (2003)
  - Uchi wa Step Family (2005)
  - Kita no Zeronen (2005)
  - Mabataki (2006)

== S ==
- Maya Sakura (born 1998)
  - Mecha-Mecha Iketeru! (2009)
  - Wagaya no Rekishi (1 episode, 2010)
  - Gekijô-ban: Kaidan resutoran (2010)
  - Soreike! Anpanman: Hashire! Waku waku Anpanman Grand Prix (voice, short film, 2014)
- Hinako Saeki (born 1977)
  - It's a Summer Vacation Everyday (1994)
  - A Quiet Life (1995)
- Soma Santoki (born 2005)
  - Mentai Piriri (2019)
  - Idaten (5 episodes, 2019)
  - Yell (2020)
  - Koko wa Ima kara Rinri Desu (1 episode, 2021)
  - School Police (1 episode, 2021)
  - Kono hatsukoi wa fikushon desu (2 episodes, 2021)
  - Hikikomori Sensei (3 episodes, 2021)
  - Cube (2021)
  - Lessons in Murder (2022)
  - Fragments of the Last Will (2022)
  - Take a Stroll (2022)
  - The Boy and the Heron (voice, 2023)
  - The Days (1 episode, 2023)
  - The Greatest Teacher (4 episodes, 2023)
- Rio Sasaki (born 2002)
  - Goo Goo Datte Nekodearu (2008)
  - 20th Century Boys (2008)
  - Otokomae! (2008)
  - Mei-chan no Shitsuji (2009)
  - Tokyo Shōjo (2009)
  - NonChan Noriben (2009)
  - Ryōmaden (2010)
  - Kyōfu (2010)
  - Permanent Nobara (2010)
  - Bushi do Sixteen (2010)
  - Arthur Christmas (Japanese voice of Gwen Hines, 2011)
  - Frozen (Japanese voice of 8-year-old Elsa, 2013)
  - Annie (Japanese voice of Annie Bennett, 2014)
  - Teenage Mutant Ninja Turtles (Japanese voice of Young April O'Neil, 2014)
  - Suicide Squad (Japanese voice of Zoe, 2016)
  - Rudolf and Ippaiattena (voice, 2016)
  - Wonder Woman (Japanese voice of 12-year-old Diana, 2017)
- Momoko Shibuya (born 1987)
  - Ugly Duckling (1996)
  - Himawari (2000)
  - Swan Song (2002)
  - Otasuke Girl (2003)
- Mirai Shida (born 1993)
  - Eien no 1/2 (2000)
  - Nukumori (2000)
  - Gekai Arimori Saeko II (2000)
  - Shikei Dai no Ropeway (2001)
  - Mariko (2001)
  - Inubue (2002)
  - Hatsu Taiken (2 episodes, 2002)
  - Shōnentachi 3 (2002)
  - Bara no Jūjika (1 episode, 2002)
  - Zako Kenji Ushio Tadashi no Jikenbo (2002)
  - Stewardess Keiji 7 (2003)
  - Honto ni Atta Kowai Hanashi: Haru no Kyōfu Mystery (2003)
  - Kawa, Itsuka Umie (1 episode, 2003)
  - Kamen Rider Ryuki (2003)
  - Kamen Rider 555: Paradise Lost (2003)
  - Tokusou Sentai Dekaranger The Movie: Full Blast Action (2004)
  - Amemasu no Kawa "First Love" (2004)
  - Itoshi Kimi e (1 episode, 2004)
  - Reikan Bus Guide Jikenbo (1 episode, 2004)
  - Zako Kenji Ushio Tadashi no Jikenbo 2 (2004)
  - Joō no Kyōshitsu (2005)
  - Haru to Natsu (2005)
  - The Queen's Classroom (2005)
  - Honto ni Atta Kowai Hanashi: Nanika ga Soko ni Iru (2005)
  - Zako Kenji Ushio Tadashi no Jikenbo 3 (2005)
  - Spring Snow (2005)
  - Manbiki G-Men Nikaidou Yuki (1 episode, 2005)
  - Tsubakiyama Kachō no Nanokakan (2006)
  - 14-year-old Mother (2006)
  - Suppli (2006)
  - Tantei Gakuen Q (2006)
  - The Queen's Classroom Special: Datenshi (1 episode, 2006)
  - Dream Again (2007)
  - Tantei Gakuen Q (2007)
  - Watashitachi no Kyōkasho (2007)
  - Kujira to Medaka (2008)
  - Seigi no Mikata (2008)
  - Kabei: Our Mother (2008)
  - Shokudō Katatsumuri (2008)
  - Dare mo Mamotte Kurenai (2009)
  - Voice: Inochi Naki Mono no Koe (1 episode, 2009)
  - Kurobe no Taiyō (2009)
  - Boss (1 episode, 2009)
  - Shōkōjo Seira (2009)
  - Sakuramichi (2009)
  - Honto ni Atta Kowai Hanashi Special (2009)
  - Sotsu Uta: Best Friend (2010)
  - Himitsu (2010)
  - Hammer Session! (2010)
  - Arrietty (voice, 2010)
  - Yonimo Kimyōna Monogatari: Aki no Tokubetsuhen (2011)
  - Bull Doctor (2011)
- Kaori Shimizu (born 1983)
  - Serial Experiments Lain (voice, 1998)
  - Boogiepop Phantom (voice, 2000)
  - A.LI.CE (voice, 2000)
  - Strange Dawn (voice, 2000)
  - Inuyasha (voice, 2000–2004)
  - Banner of the Stars (voice, 2001)
  - The Family's Defensive Alliance (voice, 2001)
  - Fruits Basket (voice, 2001)
  - Alien Nine (voice, 2001)
- Masaki Suda (born 1993)
  - Kamen Rider W (2009–2010)
  - Kamen Rider Decade: All Riders vs. Dai-Shocker (voice, cameo, 2009)
  - Kamen Rider × Kamen Rider W & Decade: Movie War 2010 (2009)
  - Kamen Rider W Forever: A to Z/The Gaia Memories of Fate (2010)
  - Kamen Rider × Kamen Rider OOO & W Featuring Skull: Movie War Core (2010)
  - Hammer Session! (2010)
  - Dolittle the Veterinary Physician (2010)
  - You Taught Me All the Precious Things (2011)
  - Don Quixote (6 episodes, 2011)
  - Runaways: For Your Love (2011)
  - OOO, Den-O, All Riders: Let's Go Kamen Riders (2011)
  - Kamen Rider W Returns (2011)
  - High School Debut (2011)
  - Kamen Rider × Kamen Rider Fourze & OOO: Movie War Mega Max (2011)
- Hana Sugisaki (born 1997)
  - Don Quixote (1 episode, 2011)
  - Ouran High School Host Club (5 episodes, 2011)
  - 13-sai no Hellowork (1 episode, 2012)
  - Miss Double Faced Teacher (2012)
  - Resident: Story of 5 Interns (1 episode, 2012)
  - Kazoku no Uta (2012)
  - Ouran High School Host Club (2012)
  - Humanoid Monster, Bem (2012)
  - Ferris Wheel at Night (2013)
  - Nameless Poison (6 episodes, 2013)
  - Madam Marmalade no Ijō na Nazo: Question (2013)
  - Madam Marmalade no Ijō na Nazo: Answer (2013)
  - In the Hero (2014)
  - Emergency Interrogation Room (2014)
  - Jiken Kyumeii 2 - IMAT no Kiseki (2014)
  - Mysterious Transfer Student (2014)
  - Shinigami-kun (1 episode, 2014)
  - Mozu (2014)
  - When Marnie Was There (voice, 2014)
  - Gakkō no Kaidan (2015)
  - The Pearls of the Stone Man (2015)
  - Tsukuroi Tatsu Hito (2015)
  - Pieta in the Toilet (2015)
  - Mozu (2015)
- Fuku Suzuki (born 2004)
  - Keikan no Chi (2009)
  - GeGeGe no Nyōbō (2010)
  - Daimajin Kanon (2010)
  - Golden Slumber (2010)
  - A Boy and His Samurai (2010)
  - Ōkike no Tanoshii Ryokō: Shin-kon Jigoku-hen (2010)
  - Inu to Anata no Monogatari, Inu no Eiga (2010)
  - Another face Keiji-Sōmuka Ōtomo Tetsu (2011)
  - Marumo no Okite (2011)
  - Hanazakari no Kimitachi e (cameo, 1 episode, 2011)
  - Humanoid Monster Bem (2011)
  - 62nd NHK Kōhaku Uta Gassen (2011)
  - Happy Feet Two (Japanese voice of Erik, 2011)
  - Waratte Iitomo! (2012–2014)
  - be Ponkikkīzu (2012)
  - Blackboard-jidai to Tatakatta Kyōshi-tachi (2012)
  - Kodomo Keisatsu (2012)
  - Doraemon: Nobita and the Island of Miracles—Animal Adventure (voice, 2012)
  - Ikkyū-san (2012)
  - Akumu-chan (1 episode, 2012)
  - Kuruma Isu de Boku wa Sora o Tobu (2012)
  - Humanoid Monster Bem (2012)
  - Kodomo Keisatsu (2013)
  - Kodomo Keishi (2013)
  - Share House no Koibito (1 episode, 2013)
  - Onna Nobunaga (2013)
  - Ikkyū-san 2 (2013)
  - Another face Keiji-Sōmuka Ōtomo Tetsu 2 (2013)
  - Otto no Kanojo (2013)
  - Nikai ga Kowai (2013)
  - Miyamoto Musashi (2014)
  - Keiji 110 Kilo (2014)
  - Akumu-chan: The Movie (2014)
  - Bara Iro no Būko (2014)
  - The Peanuts Movie (Japanese voice of Charlie Brown, 2015)
  - Mixed Doubles (2017)
  - Warotenka (2017–2018)
  - The 47 Ronin in Debt (2019)
  - Utsubyō 9dan (2020)
  - Zokki (2021)
  - Saber + Zenkaiger: Super Hero Senki (2021)
  - Kappei (2022)
  - Strange World (Japanese voice of Ethan Clade, 2022)
  - Kamen Rider Geats (2022–2023)

== T ==
- Airi Taira (born 1984)
  - Dreammaker (1999)
  - Daburusu (2001)
  - 3 nen B gumi Kinpachi sensei 6 (2002)
  - Tantei Kazoku (2002)
- Katsunori Takahashi (born 1964)
  - Pīman Hakusho (1980)
  - Nihon Philharmonic Monogatari-en no Dai go Gakushō (1981)
- Hideko Takamine (1924–2010)
  - Mother (1929)
  - Tokyo Chorus (1931)
  - Tsuzurikata kyōshitsu (1938)
  - Niji tatsu oka (1938)
  - Hideko the Bus Conductor (1941)
  - Horse (1941)
- Makoto Takeda (born 1990)
  - Maya Okamoto – Dear... (2002)
  - Cutie Honey: The Live (2007–2008)
- Kanon Tani (born 2004)
  - Boku no Imōto (2009)
  - Oyaji no Ichiban Nagai Hi (2009)
  - Natsu no Koi wa Nijiiro ni Kagayaku (2010)
  - Film Factory's series Eigo Rhythm (2010)
  - Namae o Nakushita Megami (2011)
  - Full Throttle Girl (2011)
  - Utsukushi Rinjin (2011)
  - Propose Kyodai (2011)
  - Ikemen Desu ne (1 episode, 2011)
  - Renai Neet: Wasureta Koi no Hajimekata (1 episode, 2012)
  - Papadol! (1 episode, 2012)
  - Mi o Tsukushi Ryōrichō (2012)
- Shimba Tsuchiya (born 1996)
  - Gunjō (2009)
  - Pedal no Yukue (2009)
  - The Grudge 3 (2009)
  - Ryōmaden (2010)
  - Supah Ninjas (Japanese voice of Flint Forster, 3 episodes, 2013)

== W ==
- Konomi Watanabe (born 2006)
  - Rebirth (2011)
  - Bara iro no seisen (2011)
  - Pafekuto buru (1 episode, 2012)
  - Hakushon daimaô (2013)
  - Ashita, mama ga inai (2014)
  - Ore no dandyism (1 episode, 2014)
  - Naze shoujo wa kioku wo ushiawanakereba naranakattanoka?: Kokoro no kagakusha Narumi Saku no chousen (2014)
  - Mama to papa ga ikiru riyuu (2014)
  - Eien no 0 (1 episode, 2015)
  - Garasu no Ashi (2015)
  - Mare (3 episodes, 2015)
  - Keiji Shichinin (1 episode, 2015)
  - Angel Heart (2015)
  - Beppinsan (11 episodes, 2016-2017)
  - Segodon (2 episodes, 2018)

== Y ==
- Yūya Yagira (born 1990)
  - Kunimitsu no Matsuri (2003)
  - Denchi ga Kireru Made (2004)
  - Nobody Knows (2004)
  - Shining Boy and Little Randy (2005)
  - Sugar and Spice (2006)
  - The Bandage Club (2007)
- Riko Yoshida (born 1999)
  - Boy Meets Ghost (2006)
  - Sakuran (2007)
  - Shinigami no Ballad (2007)
  - Hanayome to Papa (2007)
  - Yamada Taro Monogatari (2007)
  - Wachigaiya Itosato (2007)
  - Hotaru no Hikari (1 episode, 2007)
  - Osen (1 episode, 2008)
  - Seigi no Mikata (1 episode, 2008)
  - Tomorrow (1 episode, 2008)
  - Kurosagi (2008)
  - Ano Sora o Oboeteru (2008)
  - Oh! My Girl!! (2008)
