= Torajirō Saitō =

Japanese film director (1905–1982)

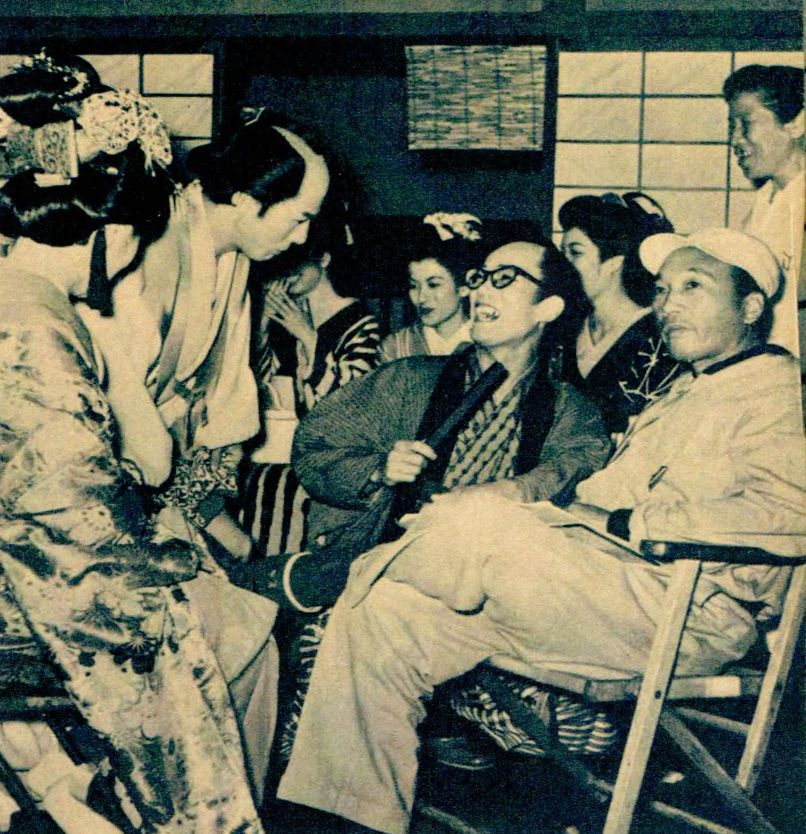
- The filming site of the movie "Koisuredo Koisuredo Monogatari"(1956). The people in front are from right to left, Director Torajiro Saito, Tony Tani, Ichiro Arishima, and Mariko Miyagi.
- Born: January 30, 1905. Yuri District Akita Prefecture
- Died: May 1, 1982 (aged 77)
- Other name: The God of Comedy
- Occupation: Film director
- Years active: 1926-1962
- Known for: Directing over 200 Slapstick and nonsense comedy films
- Notable work: Kodakara Sodo
- Spouse: Tomoko Naniwa (actress)

Torajirō Saitō (斎藤 寅次郎, Saitō Torajirō; January 30, 1905 – May 1, 1982) was a Japanese film director known for his comedy films. Born in Akita Prefecture, he entered Shōchiku's Kamata studio in 1922 and debuted as a director in 1926. He later worked at the Shintoho and Toho studios. He became known as the "god of comedy" for directing over 200 films, many of which were nonsense comedies featuring famous clowns such as Ken'ichi Enomoto, Roppa Furukawa, and Junzaburo Ban.

== Filmography ==
His works include:

- Akeyuku Sora (1929)
- Wasei Kingu Kongu (1933)
- Kodakara Sodo (1935)
- Akireta musume-tachi, alternate title: (金語楼の子宝騒動) (1949)
- Nodo jimankyō jidai (1949)
- Odoroki ikka (1949)
- Akogare no Hawaii Kōro (1950)
- Aozora tenshi (1950)
- Tennō no Bōshi (天皇の帽子) (1950) jointly directed with Masaki Mori (ja:毛利正樹)
- Tokyo Kid (1950)
- Tonbo kaeri dōchū (1950)
- Unusual trip to Hawaii (Hawai chindochu) (1954)
- Ukare Gitsune Senbon Zakura (1954)

== See also ==
- List of Japanese film directors
