= Shintarō Kido =

Japanese dancer (1916–1975)

Shintarō Kido (木戸 新太郎) aka Kidoshin キドシン (1916–1975) was a Japanese dancer.

== Filmography ==
He played in 36 films:

- (あきれた娘たち Akireta musume-tachi), alternate title: (金語楼の子宝騒動) (1949)
- (おどろき一家 Odoroki ikka) (1949)
- (憧れのハワイ航路 Akogare no Hawaii kōro) (1950)
