= Rō Takenaka =

Japanese anarchist and writer (1930–1991)

- 竹中 労
- Born: May 30, 1930; Ushigome, Tokyo, Japan
- Died: May 19, 1991 (aged 60); Chiyoda, Tokyo, Japan
- Occupations: Journalist, Anarchist
- Writing career
- Period: 1959–1991
- Subjects: Culture, Politics

Rō Takenaka (竹中労, Takenaka Rō; born Tsutomu, May 30, 1930 – May 19, 1991) was a Japanese author, journalist and cultural critic.

== Biography ==
Rō Takenaka was born in Tokyo on May 30, 1930. He was the son of artist Eitarō Takenaka. He studied the Russian language at the Tokyo University of Foreign Studies, but dropped out before graduation. He began his career as a journalist in 1958, working first for Mainichi Shimbun before moving to Josei Jishin in 1959. He became known as "Fighting Takenaka" for his vocal criticisms of political elites and entertainment tycoons, publishing a weekly column titled "Slaying the Elite" in The Yomiuri Shimbun. He also became involved in cultural criticism, penning commentaries of fiction, films and music.

Takenaka promoted a dichotomy between traditional Japanese culture and modern Western culture. In 1965, Takenaka wrote a book about the career of singer Hibari Misora, in which he praised her for maintaining Japan's "democratic and ethnic music tradition" in spite of the recent Americanization of Japanese culture. When the book was first released, it was poorly received by contemporary musical scholars, but according to Takenaka, it later came to be recognised as "common sense". By the 1970s, Takenaka's promotion of a homogenous "Japanese-ness", based in a nostalgic view of traditional Japanese life, gained acceptance among producers of Enka music.

In the late 1960s, Takenaka applauded a "daring" stunt by the television show Konto 55-go, in which the show's hosts played against women in a strip game of rock paper scissors. He proclaimed that showing nakedness was the "ultimate real thing" and praised the show's authenticity, which he juxtaposed with a television industry he viewed as artificial.

Following the end of the US occupation of the Ryukyu islands in 1972, Takenaka began to promote Okinawan culture in mainland Japan. In 1975, he published a narrative book about Okinawan poetry, which introduced mainstream Japanese audiences to its works for the first time. Takenaka's promotion of Okinawan Min'yō caused it to gain popularity, leading to its incoporation into the national music scene during the 1970s and 1980s.

Alongside his cultural work, Takenaka also engaged in activism, variously describing himself as an anarchist and communist. As a theorist of third-worldism, along with Ryu Ota and Hiraoka Masaaki, he developed a critique of Marxism during the 1970s. In contrast to the Marxist theory of proletarian revolution, he considered the Ainu, Ryukyuans, urban underclasses and the rural poor to be the true revolutionary classes in Japan.

He was diagnosed with liver cancer, but continued writing. He died on May 19, 1991.

== Bibliography ==
- Benny, Tong Koon Fung (2015). "A tale of two stars: understanding the establishment of femininity in enka through Misora Hibari and Fuji Keiko" (PDF). Situations. 8 (1): 23–44. ISSN 2288-7822.
- Cho, Sumi (2020). "'Playing Okinawan': A Search for Authenticity and the Power Asymmetry in Japanese Appropriation of Okinawan Folk Music". Journal of Intercultural Studies. 41 (3): 280–298. doi:10.1080/07256868.2020.1751597.
- Humphrey, David (2017). "Shattering the Everyday: Konto 55-go and the Television Comedy of the Late 60s". Japan Studies Association Journal. 15 (1): 23–40.
- King, Kirk (2025). Chasing Kadekaru (PhD thesis). University of British Columbia. doi:10.14288/1.0449084.
- Reki, Andō (2024). "Toda Tōru's Anti-Marxist Turn" (PDF). European Journal of Japanese Philosophy. 9: 109–131. ISSN 2367-3095.
- "竹中 労" [Takenaka Rō]. Kotobank.
