= Oshidori kenkagasa =

Oshidori kenkagasa おしどり喧嘩笠
- Directed by: Ryo Hagiwara
- Produced by: Toho
- Release date: May 22, 1957
- Country: Japan
- Language: Japanese

Oshidori kenkagasa (おしどり喧嘩笠, Oshidori kenkagasa) is a 1957 black-and-white Japanese film directed by Ryo Hagiwara.

== Cast ==
- Hibari Misora
- Kōji Tsuruta
- Akio Kobori (小堀明男)
- Machiko Kitagawa (北川町子)
- Shunji Sakai (堺駿二)
- Kyu Sazanka (山茶花究)
- Nakajiro Tomita (富田仲次郎)
- Joji Kaieda (海江田譲二)
- Ryuzaburo Mitsuoka (光岡龍三郎)
- Kinnosuke Takamatsu (高松錦之助)
