= Koji Shima =

Japanese film director (1901–1986)

- 島 耕二
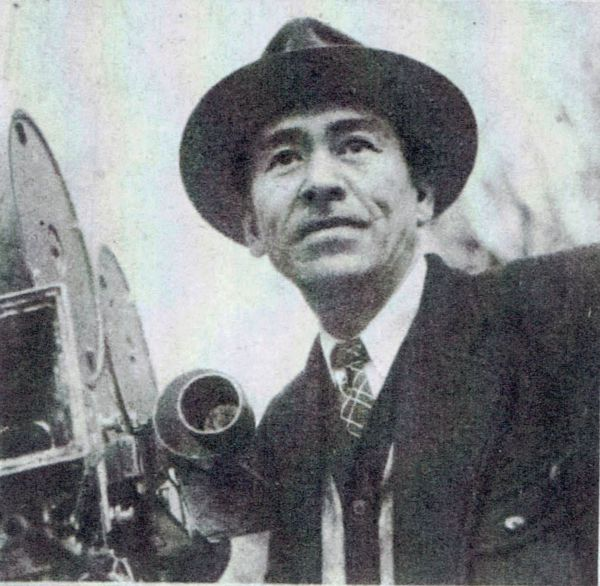
- Koji Shima on 15 May 1947
- Born: 16 February 1901; Nagasaki, Japan
- Died: 10 September 1986 (aged 85)
- Other name: Takehiko Kagoshima
- Occupations: Film director; actor; screenwriter
- Years active: 1925–1970
- Spouse(s): Ryoko Otani (m. 1926, divorced) Natsuko Katayama (divorced) Yukiko Todoroki (m. 1953; div. 1965)
- Children: Akihiko Katayama (son) (Note: Biological son of Shima and his first wife Ryoko Otani, but was raised by the second wife Natsuko Katayama.)

Koji Shima (島 耕二, Shima Kōji; 16 February 1901 – 10 September 1986) was a Japanese film director, actor, and screenwriter.

== Career ==
Born as Takehiko Kagoshima in Nagasaki, Shima left for Tokyo after graduating from high school. He was in the first class of the Nihon Eiga Haiyū Gakkō and joined the Nikkatsu studio as an actor in 1925. Playing mostly romantic leads, he appeared in films directed by such masters as Tomu Uchida and Kenji Mizoguchi. He turned to directing in 1939, and quickly came to prominence with films such as Kaze no Matasaburō, an adaptation of a Kenji Miyazawa story, and Jirō Monogatari. After the war, he directed such films as Ginza Kankan Musume and Jūdai no Seiten at Shintoho and Daiei Studios. He won a prize at the 1st Moscow International Film Festival for Unforgettable Trail. Some of his final films were made in Hong Kong for Shaw Brothers.

He directed over 90 films as a director and appeared in over 90 films as an actor. He was once married to the actress Yukiko Todoroki.

Noriaki Yuasa, specially known for the Gamera franchise, is Shima's nephew and was temporarily his assistant director.

== Selected filmography ==
=== Director ===
- Kaze no Matasaburō (風の又三郎) (1940)
- Jirō Monogatari (次郎物語) (1941)
- Ginza Kankan Musume (1949)
- Hibari no komoriuta (1951)
- Ringo-en no shōjo (1952)
- The Wind Has Risen (1954)
- The Phantom Horse (1955)
- Warning from Space (1956)
- Zangiku monogatari (1956)
- Yūrakuchō de Aimashō (1958)
- Unforgettable Trail (1959)
- Sasameyuki (The Makioka Sisters) (1959)

=== Actor ===
- Jōnetsu no Shijin Takuboku (情熱の詩人啄木) (1936)
- Naked City (1937 (裸の町) (1937)
