= Kinnosuke Takamatsu =

Japanese actor

- 高松錦之助
- Born: Tsunao Watanabe; 13 January 1898; Hakodate, Hokkaido, Japan
- Died: 14 May 1979 (aged 81)
- Other name: Kyōsuke Takamatsu
- Occupation: Actor

Kinnosuke Takamatsu (Japanese: 高松 錦之助, Hepburn: Takamatsu Kinnosuke; 13 January 1898 – 14 May 1979) was a Japanese actor.

== Career ==
Born in Hakodate, Hokkaido, Takamatsu acted in shinpa theater before joining Makino Film Productions in 1924. He left the studio in 1926 and joined director Teinosuke Kinugasa in the independent production of the avant-garde film A Page of Madness, playing the crucial role of the bearded inmate. He later joined Ryunosuke Tsukigata's independent production company before moving to Shochiku. During World War II, he left the film business and focused on theater, but he returned to film in 1946 in Kenji Mizoguchi's Utamaro and His Five Women. He finished his career appearing in many Toei Company jidaigeki. He performed in over 200 films in his lifetime.

== Selected filmography ==
- A Page of Madness (1926)
- The Story of the Last Chrysanthemums (1939)
- Utamaro and His Five Women (1946)
- Bloody Spear at Mount Fuji (1955)
- 13 Assassins (1963)
- Oshidori kenkagasa (1957)
- The Mad Fox (1962)
- The Sword of Doom (1966)
