= Aozora tenshi =

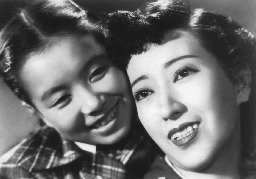
- Japanese movie poster
- Directed by: Torajiro Saito
- Written by: Yoshichi Yamashita
- Produced by: Ōizumi Eiga
- Music by: Tadashi Manjome
- Distributed by: Toei
- Release date: May 20, 1950
- Running time: 82 / 60 minutes
- Country: Japan
- Language: Japanese

Aozora tenshi (青空天使), literally: "Blue Sky Angel", is a 1950 Japanese black-and-white film directed by Torajiro Saito.

== Cast ==
- Hibari Misora

== See also ==
- List of films in the public domain in the United States
