= Kodakara Sodo =

- Directed by: Torajiro Saito
- Written by: Tadao Ikeda
- Starring: Shigeru Ogura; Yaeko Izumo; Shotaro Fujimatsu; Akio Nomura
- Narrated by: Shunsui Matsuda; Midori Sawato
- Cinematography: Yoshio Taketomi
- Production company: Shochiku Kamata
- Distributed by: Digital Meme (DVD)
- Release date: 1935 (Japan)
- Running time: 33 minutes
- Country: Japan
- Language: Japanese (intertitles)

Kodakara Sodo (子宝騒動, Kid Commotion) is a 1935 black and white Japanese silent film with benshi accompaniment directed by Torajiro Saito. This is a rare example of a silent Japanese slapstick film that has survived to this day.
