= Hibari Misora =

Japanese singer and actress (1937-1989)

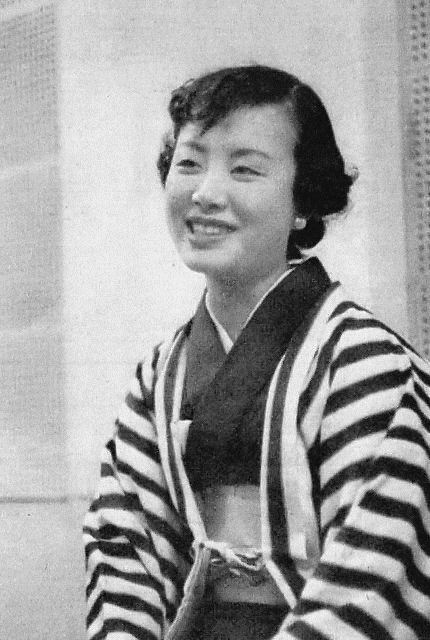
- Misora in 1954
- Born: Katō Kazue (加藤 和枝); May 29, 1937; Yokohama, Kanagawa, Japan
- Died: June 24, 1989 (aged 52); Minato, Tokyo, Japan
- Other names: Queen of Showa, Queen of the popular song, Queen of Enka
- Occupations: Singer, Actress
- Honours: People's Honor Award on July 2, 1989 after her death
- Musical career
- Genres: Kayōkyoku; Jazz; Enka
- Years active: 1945–1989
- Website: misorahibari.com

Hibari Misora (美空 ひばり, Misora Hibari; born Kazue Katō (加藤 和枝, Katō Kazue) May 29, 1937 – June 24, 1989) was a Japanese singer and actress. She received a Medal of Honor for her contributions to music and for improving the welfare of the public, and was the first woman to receive the People's Honour Award, which was conferred posthumously for giving the public hope and encouragement after World War II.

Misora recorded a total of 1,200 songs and sold 68 million records. After she died, consumer demand for her recordings grew significantly, and, by 2001, she had sold more than 80 million records. By 2019, record sales surpassed 100 million. Her swan-song "Kawa no Nagare no Yō ni" (川の流れのように) is often performed by numerous artists and orchestras as a tribute to her, including notable renditions by The Three Tenors (Spanish/Italian), Teresa Teng (Taiwanese) and Mariachi Vargas de Tecalitlan (Mexican).

Each year there is a special on Japanese television and radio featuring her songs. A memorial concert for Misora was held at the Tokyo Dome on November 11, 2012. It featured numerous musicians such as Ai, Koda Kumi, Ken Hirai, Kiyoshi Hikawa, Exile, AKB48 and Nobuyasu Okabayashi amongst others, paying tribute by singing her most famous songs.

== Biography ==
=== Life and career ===
Misora was born Kazue Katō (加藤 和枝, Katō Kazue) on May 29, 1937 in Isogo-ku, Yokohama, Japan. Her father, Masukichi Katō (加藤 増吉, Katō Masukichi), was a fishmonger and her mother, Kimie Katō (加藤 喜美枝, Katō Kimie), a housewife. Katō displayed musical talent from an early age after singing for her father at a World War II send-off party in 1943 at the age of six. Masukichi invested a small fortune from the family's savings to begin a musical career for his daughter. In 1945, at the age of eight, Kazue made her debut at a concert hall in Yokohama. At that time, she changed her surname from Katō to Misora (美空; lit. "beautiful sky"), at the suggestion of her mother.

In 1946, at the age of nine, Kazue Misora (美空 和枝, Misora Kazue) entered the NHK Nodo Jiman singing competition. Judges did not pass her because they felt her voice was too mature and that it was inappropriate for a child to sing an adult song. Later that year, she appeared on another NHK broadcast, and this time impressed Japanese composer Masao Koga with her singing ability. He considered her to be a child prodigy with the courage, understanding, and emotional maturity of an adult. Over the next few years, Misora became an accomplished singer and toured notable concert halls to sold-out crowds. While the general public loved her, she was criticized by the social and cultural elites for sounding too much like a grown woman and for singing boogie woogies and love songs rather than children's songs.

Kazue began her recording career in 1949 at the age of 12, now with the name Hibari Misora (美空 ひばり, Misora Hibari), which means "lark in the beautiful sky," and starred in the film Nodojiman-kyō jidai (のど自慢狂時代). The film gained her nationwide recognition. That same year, she recorded her first single Kappa Boogie-Woogie (河童ブギウギ, Kappa bugiugi) for Nippon Columbia. It became a commercial hit, selling more than 450,000 copies. She subsequently recorded "Kanashiki kuchibue", which was featured on a radio program and was a national hit.

As an actress, Misora starred in more than 150 movies between 1949 and 1971, and won numerous awards. Her performance in Tokyo Kid (1950), in which she played a street orphan, made her symbolic of both the hardship and the national optimism of post-World War II Japan.

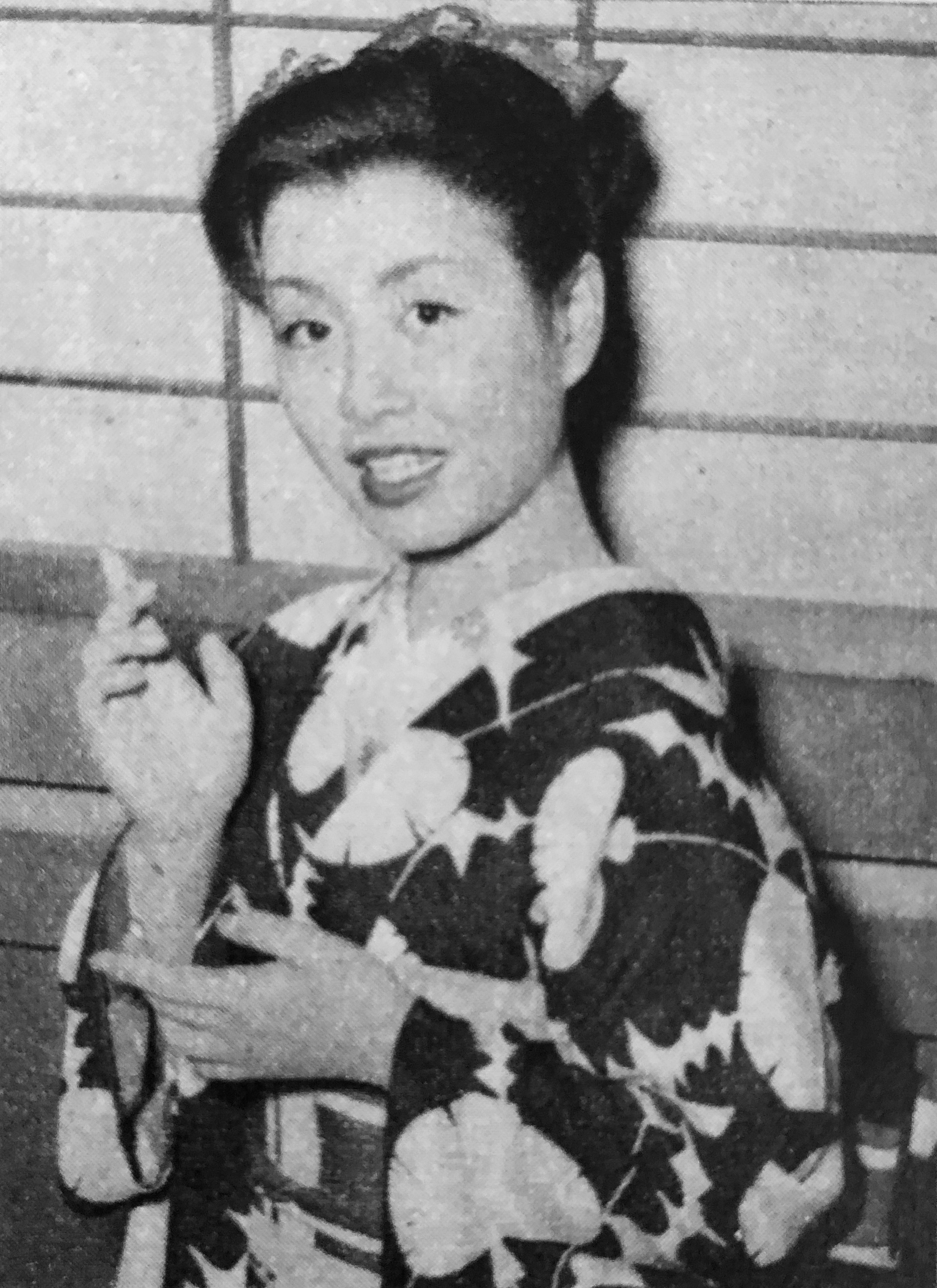
Misora in 1954

In June 1950, Misora was one of the first entertainers from Japan to visit the United States after the war. She performed in Hawaii and California.

In 1956, Misora was briefly engaged to musician Mitsuru Ono. Their engagement was called off when Misora was told she would have to give up her career in order to marry.

On January 13, 1957, Misora was attacked and injured with hydrochloric acid at Asakusa International Theater. The suspect was identified as a fanatical admirer of hers.

In 1962, Misora married actor Akira Kobayashi. They divorced in 1964, and she never remarried. Her mother, who had been opposed to the marriage, later stated that the unhappiest moment in her life was when her daughter married Kobayashi and the happiest moment was when they divorced.

Between 1949 and 1971, Misora appeared in 8 to 12 films per year, usually with top billing. These films ranged from light contemporary romances to period films with sword-fighting action. In many of her period films, she was cast either in male roles or in female roles disguised as men. After she ended her film career, Misora sometimes sang in male drag in her many television performances. Her performances in these roles became a recurring feature of her public image, particularly in entertainment programs where she sometimes performed songs while dressed as a man.

In 1973, Misora's younger brother, Tetsuya Katō, was prosecuted for gang-related activity. Although NHK did not acknowledge any connection, Misora was excluded from Kōhaku Uta Gassen for the first time in 18 years. Offended, she refused to appear on any NHK programs for years afterwards. Nevertheless, Misora eventually did make peace with NHK and appeared in the 1979 Kōhaku as a special guest. This was her final appearance on the program. Misora appeared occasionally on other NHK programs, but felt she no longer had a reason to perform on Kōhaku.

In 1978, Misora adopted her seven-year-old nephew, Tetsuya's son Kazuya Katō.

In 1980, on the 35th year anniversary of her debut, Misora performed a recital at the Nippon Budokan in Tokyo.

=== Illness and death ===
The 1980s were difficult years for Misora. Her mother died in 1981 and a year later her best friend, fellow singer and actress Chiemi Eri, died. Misora’s brothers both died in 1983 and 1986, respectively. Misora and her mother had been extremely close; not only had Kimie been her daughter's number one fan, but also she had worked as Misora's producer/manager throughout her career. To cope with her sorrow, Misora, having already been known as a hard drinker, increased her drinking and smoking even further.

In April 1987, Misora suddenly collapsed on stage at a concert performance in Fukuoka. She was rushed to a nearby hospital, where she was diagnosed with avascular necrosis brought on by chronic hepatitis. Doctors did not reveal to the press that she was also suffering from cirrhosis so as to not cause worry to her fans and associates. She was immediately admitted, but eventually showed signs of recovery in August. She commenced recording a new song in October, and in April 1988 performed at her comeback concert at Tokyo Dome. At the time, the audience was unaware that she had still not fully recovered and spent her backstage time lying in a bed with an oxygen tank. Despite overwhelming pain in her legs, Misora performed a total of 40 songs. Once off the stage after the last song, she collapsed and was taken away by an ambulance that was on standby.

Misora's health improvement was to be temporary, as her liver weakened from decades of heavy drinking and her condition worsened. Yet, she continued to perform live while hiding the true nature of her health from her fans. On February 7, 1989 (less than a month after the Heisei period began), Misora held her final concert in Kokura. It was the start of a nationwide tour which had to be cancelled due to her failing health. On March 21, she wrapped up her nearly four-and-a-half-decade career with a 10-hour live radio show for Nippon Broadcasting System. She was later hospitalized at Juntendo University Hospital in Tokyo with interstitial pneumonitis.

On the morning of June 24, 1989, Misora died at Juntendo. She was 52. Her death was widely mourned throughout Japan and many felt the Shōwa period had truly come to an end. The major television networks had to cancel their regular programming that evening to bring the news of her death and instead aired various tributes.

=== Legacy ===
In 1993, a monument depicting Misora's portrait with an inscribed poem was erected in her memory near Sugi no Osugi in Ōtoyo, Kōchi. In 1947, a 10-year old Misora had been involved in a serious bus collision in Ōtoyo. While recovering from her injuries, she remained in the town and reportedly visited Sugi no Osugi and wished to become the top singer in Japan. Misora's father was so upset, he demanded that she stopped singing. The young Misora responded "If I can't sing, then I will die." She eventually returned to Tokyo, where she began her recording career in 1949 at the age of 12.

In 1994, the Hibari Misora Museum opened in Arashiyama, Kyoto. This multi-story museum complex traced the history of Misora's life and career in various multimedia exhibits, and displayed various memorabilia. It attracted more than 5 million visitors, until it closed down November 30, 2006 as to allow a scheduled renovation of the building. The main exhibits were relocated to the Shōwa period section of the Edo-Tokyo Museum, until a renovation was completed. The brand new Hibari Misora Theater opened in its place on April 26, 2008, and includes a CD for sale of a previously unreleased song. A bronze statue of her debut was built as a memorial in Yokohama in 2002 and attracts around 300,000 visitors per year.

Beginning in 1990, television and radio stations play Misora's song "Kawa no Nagare no Yō ni" (川の流れのように) annually on her birth date to show respect. In a national poll by NHK in 1997, the song was voted the greatest Japanese song of all time by more than 10 million people. The song is still prominently performed by numerous artists and orchestras as a tribute to Misora, including notable renditions by The Three Tenors (Spanish/Italian), Teresa Teng (Taiwanese), Mariachi Vargas de Tecalitlan (Mexican) and Twelve Girls Band (Chinese).

On November 11, 2012, a memorial concert for Misora was held at the Tokyo Dome. It featured numerous musicians such as Ai, Koda Kumi, Ken Hirai, Kiyoshi Hikawa, Exile, AKB48 and Nobuyasu Okabayashi amongst others, paying tribute to Misora by covering her most famous songs.

In September 2019, Misora's voice became focused on after "Arekara" (あれから) was used for a version of the Vocaloid engine known as "VOCALOID:AI", which tried to recreate her singing vocals. The Vocaloid performance also used a full 3D rendering of the singer.

In 2025 her song "Kawa no Nagare no Yō ni" was the second most successful song of that year.

After Misora's death in 1989, a TBS television drama special aired later that same year under the title The Hibari Misora Story (美空ひばり物語), starring Kayoko Kishimoto as Misora. In 2005, also on TBS, Aya Ueto portrayed Misora in The Hibari Misora Birth Story (美空ひばり誕生物語).

== Notable songs ==
- "Kappa Boogie Woogie" (河童ブギウギ, 1949)
- "Kanashiki Kuchibue" (悲しき口笛, 1949)
- "Tokyo Kiddo" (東京キッド, 1950)
- "Echigo Jishi No Uta" (越後獅子の唄, 1950)
- "Omatsuri Mambo" (お祭りマンボ, 1952)
- "Ringo Oiwake" (リンゴ追分, 1952)
- "Shanghai" (上海, 1953)
- "El Choclo" (エル・チョクロ, 1953)
- "Again" (アゲイン, 1953)
- "Stardust" (スターダスト, 1953)
- "La Vie en rose" (薔薇色の人生, 1955)
- "Take the "A" Train" (A列車で行こう, 1955)
- "Love Me or Leave Me" (愛さないなら棄てて, 1956)
- "Minatomachi 13-banchi" (港町十三番地, 1957)
- "Hanagasa Dōchū" (花笠道中, 1957)
- "Yawara" (柔, 1964)
- "Kanashii Sake" (悲しい酒, 1966)
- "Makkana Taiyō" (真赤な太陽, 1967)
- "Jinsei Ichiro" (人生一路, 1970)
- "Aisansan" (愛燦燦（あいさんさん, 1986)
- "Midaregami" (みだれ髪, 1987)
- "Kawa no Nagare no Yō ni" (川の流れのように, 1989)
- "Arekara" (あれから, 2019; posthumous)

== Filmography ==
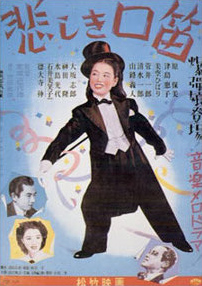
Japanese movie poster for Kanashiki kuchibue (1949) showing Hibari Misora.

Hibari Misora appeared in 166 films:

=== 1940s ===
(1940s complete)

- Nodo jimankyō jidai (のど自慢狂時代)(1949)
- Shin-Tokyo ondo: bikkuri gonin otoko (新東京音頭 びっくり五人男)(1949)
- Odoru ryū kyūjō (踊る龍宮城, lit. "Dancing Dragon Palace")(1949)
- Akireta musume-tachi (あきれた娘たち), alternate title: Kingorō no kodakara sōdō (金語楼の子宝騒動)(1949)
- Kanashiki kuchibue (悲しき口笛, lit. "Sad whistling")(1949)
- Odoroki ikka (おどろき一家)(1949)
- Home run kyō jidai (ホームラン狂時代, lit. "The Age of Home run Madness")(1949)

=== 1950s ===
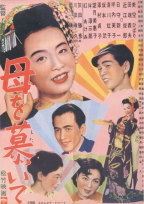
Japanese movie poster for Haha wo shitaite (1951) featuring Hibari Misora.

(1950s is complete)

- Hit Parade (ヒットパレード – 1950)
- Akogare no Hawaii kōro (憧れのハワイ航路 – 1950)
- Hōrō no utahime (放浪の歌姫, lit. "The Wandering Songstress" – 1950)
- Mukō sangen ryōdonari continued: 3rd Story - donguri utagassen (続・向う三軒両隣 第三話 どんぐり歌合戦 – 1950)
- Enoken no sokonuke daihōsō (エノケンの底抜け大放送 – 1950)
- Mukō sangen ryōdonari continued: 4th Story - koi no mikeneko (続・向う三軒両隣 第四話 恋の三毛猫)(1950)
- Aozora tenshi (青空天使, lit. "Blue Sky Angel" – 1950)
- Tokyo Kid (東京キッド – 1950)
- Sakon torimonochō: senketsu no tegata (左近捕物帖 鮮血の手型, lit. "Sakon Detective Story: The Fresh Blood Handprint" – 1950)
- Ōgon Batto: Matenrō no kaijin (黄金バット 摩天楼の怪人, lit. "Golden Bat: Mysterious stranger of the Skyscraper" – 1950)
- Tonbo kaeri dōchū (とんぼ返り道中 – 1950)
- Watashi wa josei no. 1 (1950) – as herself, the short film
- Chichi koishi (父恋し – 1951)
- Uta matsuri: Hibari shichi henge (唄祭り ひばり七変化, lit. "Song Festival: Hibari Quick Change" – 1951)
- Naki nureta ningyō (泣きぬれた人形, lit. "The Doll Wet from Crying" – 1951)
- Kurama tengu: Kakubējishi (鞍馬天狗 角兵衛獅子 – 1951)
- Haha wo shitaite (母を慕いて, lit. "Yearning for Mother" – 1951)
- Hibari no komoriuta (ひばりの子守唄, lit. "Hibari's Lullaby" – 1951)
- Kurama tengu: Kurama no himatsuri (鞍馬天狗 鞍馬の火祭 – 1951)
- Ano oka koete (あの丘越えて, lit. "Cross that Hill" – 1951)
- Yōki-na wataridori (陽気な渡り鳥 – 1952)
- Kurama tengu: Tengu kaijō (鞍馬天狗 天狗廻状 – 1952)
- Tsukigata Hanpeita (月形半平太 – 1952)
- Hibari no Sākasu Kanashiki Kobato (ひばりのサーカス 悲しき小鳩, lit. "Hibari's Circus: Sad Little Dove" – 1952)
- Ushiwakamaru (牛若丸 – 1952)
- Futari no hitomi (二人の瞳) a.k.a. Girls Hand in Hand US title (1952)
- Ringo-en no shōjo (リンゴ園の少女, lit. "Girl of Apple Park" – 1952)
- Hibari-hime hatsuyume dōchū (ひばり姫初夢道中 – 1952)
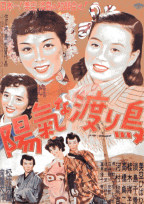
Japanese movie poster for Yōki-na wataridori (1952) featuring Hibari Misora.

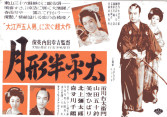
Tsukigata Hanpeita (1952)

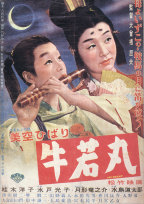
Ushiwakamaru (1952)

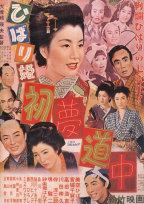
Hibari-hime hatsuyume dōchū (1952)
- Mita katakure! (三太頑れっ！ – 1953)
- Hibari no utau tamatebako (ひばりの歌う玉手箱, lit. "Hibari's Singing Treasure Chest" – 1953)
- Shimai (姉妹, lit. "Sisters" – 1953)
- Hibari no yōki-na tenshi (ひばりの陽気な天使 – 1953)
- Hibari torimonochō: Utamatsuri happyaku yachō (ひばり捕物帳 唄祭り八百八町, lit. "Hibari Detective Story: Song Festival Across Tokyo" – 1953)
- Hibari no kanashiki hitomi (ひばりの悲しき瞳 – 1953)
- Yama wo mamoru kyōdai (山を守る兄弟, lit. "The Brothers who Protect the Mountain") (1953)
- Ojōsan shachō (お嬢さん社長, lit. "Madame Company President" – 1953)
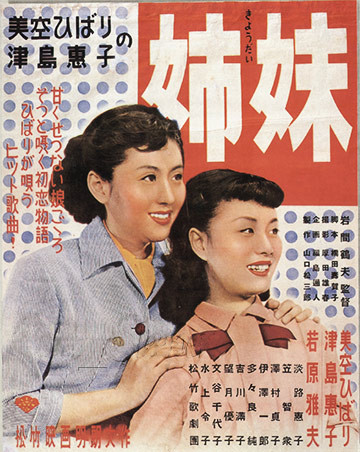
Shimai (1953)

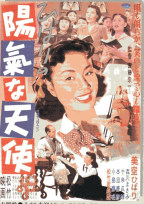
Hibari no yōki-na tenshi (1953)

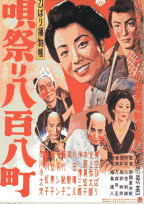
Hibari torimonochō: Utamatsuri happyaku yachō (1953)
- Misora Hibari no haru ha uta kara (美空ひばりの春は唄から, lit. "Hibari Misora's Spring is from Song" – 1954)
- Hiyodori sōshi (ひよどり草紙 – 1954)
- The Dancing Girl of Izu (伊豆の踊子, Izu no odoriko – 1954), a film adaptation of Yasunari Kawabata's story The Dancing Girl of Izu
- Uta shigure oshidori wakashū (唄しぐれ おしどり若衆 – 1954)
- Seishun romance seat: Aozora ni owasu (青春ロマンスシート 青空に坐す – 1954)
- Bikkuri gojūsantsugi (びっくり五十三次, lit. "Surprising 53 Stations of the Tōkaidō" – 1954)
- Yaoya Oshichi furisode tsukiyo (八百屋お七 ふり袖月夜 – 1954)
- Wakaki hi wa kanashi (若き日は悲し – 1954)
- Uta goyomi Onatsu Seijūrō (歌ごよみ お夏清十郎 – 1954)
- Shichihenge tanuki goten (七変化狸御殿, lit. "Quick Change Tanuki Palace" – 1954)
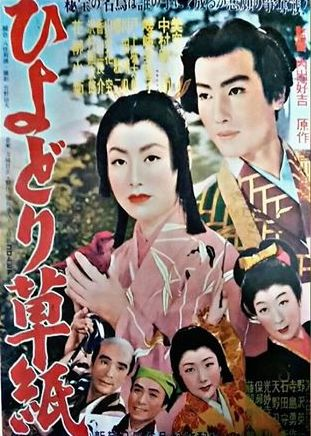
Hiyodori sōshi (1954)

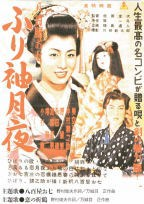
Yaoya Oshichi furisode tsukiyo (1954)

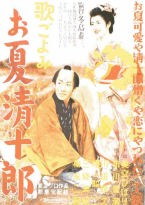
Uta goyomi Onatsu Seijūrō (1954)
- Ōedo senryōbayashi (大江戸千両囃子 – 1955)
- Musume sendōsan (娘船頭さん – 1955)
- Seishun kōro: Umi no wakōdo (青春航路 海の若人 – 1955)
- Uta matsuri mangetsu tanuki-gassen (歌まつり満月狸合戦 – 1955)
- Furisode kyōenroku (ふり袖侠艶録 – 1955)
- Takekurabe (たけくらべ, Adolescence a.k.a. Growing Up Twice a.k.a. Growing Up a.k.a. Child's Play) (1955) – a film adaptation of Higuchi Ichiyō's novel Takekurabe
- So Young, So Bright (ジャンケン娘 Janken musume – 1955)
- Furisode kotengu (ふり袖小天狗 – 1955)
- Fuefuki Wakamusha (笛吹若武者 – 1955)
- Utamatsuri Edokko Kin-san torimonochō (唄祭り 江戸っ子金さん捕物帖 – 1955)
- Rikidōzan monogatari dotō no otoko (力道山物語 怒濤の男 – 1955)
- Hatamoto taikutsu otoko: nazo no kettōjō (旗本退屈男 謎の決闘状 – 1955)
- Utae! Seishun Harikiri Musume (歌え！青春 はりきり娘 – 1955)
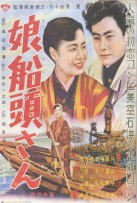
Musume sendōsan (1955)

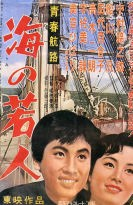
Seishun kōro: Umi no wakōdo (1955)

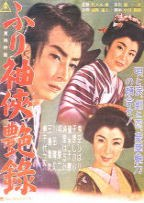
Furisode kyōenroku (1955)

Furisode kotengu (1955)

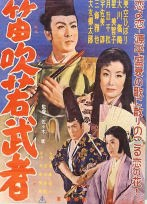
Fuefuki Wakamusha (1955)

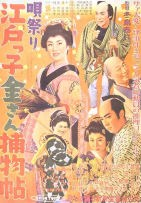
Utamatsuri Edokko Kin-san torimonochō (1955)

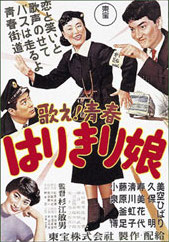
Utae! Seishun Harikiri Musume (1955)
- (銭形平次捕物控 死美人風呂) (1956)
- (おしどり囃子) (1956)
- (恋すがた狐御殿 Koi sugata kitsune goten) (1956)
- Peach Boy (宝島遠征 Takarajima ensei) (1956)
- Romantic Daughters (ロマンス娘, Romansu musume; 1956)
- (ふり袖太平記) (1956)
- (ふり袖捕物帖 若衆変化) (1956)
- (鬼姫競艶録) (1956)
- (銭形平次捕物控 まだら蛇 Zenigata Heiji torimono hikae: madara hebi) (1957)
- (大江戸喧嘩纏) (1957)
- (旗本退屈男 謎の紅蓮搭) (1957)
- (ふり袖捕物帖 ちりめん駕籠) (1957)
- (ロマンス誕生 Romansu tanjō) (1957)
- (おしどり喧嘩笠 Oshidori kenkagasa) (1957)
- (怪談番町皿屋敷) (1957)
- On Wings of Love (大当り三色娘, Ōatari sanshoku musume) a.k.a. Big Hit Three Color Daughters (1957)
- (青い海原) (1957)
- (ふり袖太鼓) (1957)
- (ひばりの三役 競艶雪之丞変化) (1957)
- (ひばりの三役 競艶雪之丞変化 後篇) (1957)
- (娘十八御意見無用)
- (おしどり駕籠)
- The Badger Palace a.k.a. The Princess of Badger Palace (大当り狸御殿 Ōatari tanukigoten) (1958)
- (丹下左膳)
- Edo Girl Detective (ひばり捕物帖 かんざし小判 Hibari torimonochō: Kanzashi koban) (1958)
- (恋愛自由型) (1958)
- (花笠若衆) (1958)
- (女ざむらい只今参上 Onnazamurai tadaima sanjō) (1958)
- (おこんの初恋 花嫁七変化) (1958)
- (ひばりの花形探偵合戦) (1958)
- (希望の乙女) (1958)
- (隠密七生記) (1958)
- Secret of the Golden Coin (ひばり捕物帖 自雷也小判 Hibari torimonochō: jiraiya koban) (1958)
- (娘の中の娘 Musume no Naka no Musume) (1958)
- (唄祭り かんざし纏) (1958)
- Young Blades' Obligations: Cherry Blossom in Long Sleeves (いろは若衆 ふり袖ざくら Iroha wakashū: Furisode sakura) (1959)
- The Great Avengers (忠臣蔵 桜花の巻 菊花の巻 Chūshingura: ōka no maki, kikka no maki) (1959)
- (鞍馬天狗) (1959)
- (東京べらんめえ娘 Tokyo beranmē musume) (1959)
- (孔雀城の花嫁) (1959)
- The Revenger in Red (紅だすき喧嘩状 Beni-dasuki kenkajō) (1959)
- (お染久松 そよ風日傘) (1959)
- (水戸黄門 天下の副将軍) (1959)
- (江戸っ子判官とふり袖小僧) (1959)
- (血闘水滸伝 怒濤の対決) (1959)
- Young Blades Obligations: Flower Palanquin Pass (いろは若衆 花駕籠峠 Iroha wakashū: hana kago tōge) (1959)
- (べらんめえ探偵娘 Beranmē tanteijō) (1959)
- (ひばり捕物帖 ふり袖小判) (1959)
- The Prickly-mouthed Geisha (べらんめえ芸者 Beranmē geisha) (1959)

=== 1960s – 1980s ===
- (Zoku beran me-e geisha) (1960)
- Samurai Vagabond (Tonosama – Yaji kita) (1960)
- (Oja kissa) (1960)
- Sword of Destiny (Koken wa arezu: tsukage ittōryu) (1960)
- Ishimatsu: The One-Eyed Avenger (Hibari no mori no ishimatsu) (1960)
- (Hizakura kotengu) (1961)
- (Hakubajō no hanayome) (1961)
- (Beran me-e geisha makari tōru) (1961)
- (Sen-hime to Hideyori) (1962)
- Hibari Traveling Performer (Hibari no Hahakoi Guitar) (1962)
- Cosmetic Sales Competition (Minyo no Tabi Akita Obako) (1963)
- (Hibari, Chiemi, Izumi: Sannin yoreba) (1964)
- (Noren ichidai: jōkyō) (1966)
- Festival of Gion (Gion matsuri) (1968) a.k.a. Gion Festival a.k.a. Kurobe's Sun a.k.a. The Day the Sun Rose

=== Songs in films ===
Her songs also appeared in 5 Japanese films:

- Shichihenge tanuki goten (七変化狸御殿 – 1954)
- Janken musume (ジャンケン娘 – 1955)
- Tenryū bōkoigasa (天竜母恋い笠 – 1960)
- Uogashi no Onna Ishimatsu (魚河岸の女石松 – 1961)
- Hana to Ryū: Seiun-hen Aizō-hen Dotō-hen (花と龍 青雲篇 愛憎篇 怒濤篇 – 1973)

== See also ==
- Best selling music artists

== Bibliography ==
- Takenaka, Rō (June 2005). Kanpon Misora Hibari. Tokyo: Chikuma Shobō. ISBN 4-480-42088-6.
