= Izu no Odoriko (1954 film) =

The Dancing Girl of Izu 伊豆の踊子 Izu no odoriko
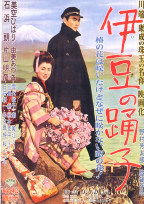
- Japanese movie poster
- Directed by: Yoshitaro Nomura
- Written by: Akira Fushimi; Yasunari Kawabata (story)
- Produced by: Takeshi Yamamoto; Shizuo Yamanouchi
- Starring: Hibari Misora
- Cinematography: Toru Nishikawa
- Music by: Chuji Kinoshita
- Production company: Shochiku
- Distributed by: Shochiku
- Release date: 31 March 1954 (Japan)
- Running time: 97 minutes
- Country: Japan
- Language: Japanese

The Dancing Girl of Izu (Japanese: 伊豆の踊子, Hepburn: Izu no odoriko) is a 1954 black-and-white Japanese film directed by Yoshitaro Nomura.

The film is based on Yasunari Kawabata's 1926 short story The Dancing Girl of Izu. A previous adaptation of the same title had been directed by Heinosuke Gosho in 1933.

== Cast ==
- Hibari Misora
- Akira Ishihama
- Azusa Yumi
- Akihiko Katayama
- Keiko Yukishiro
- Shinichi Himori
- Yoshie Minami
- Kappei Matsumoto
- Jun Tatara
- Mutsuko Sakura
