= Mutsuko Sakura =

Japanese actress (1921–2005)

- Born: Sakura Mutsuko; February 15, 1921; Japan
- Died: January 23, 2005 (aged 83); Japan
- Occupation: Actor
- Years active: 1933–2005

Mutsuko Sakura (桜 むつ子, Sakura Mutsuko, 15 February 1921 – 23 January 2005) was a Japanese actress.

Her hobby was golf. She started work at Shochiku in 1950, and played supporting roles in some of Yasujirō Ozu's films. She was a constant in Japanese film and TV drama for half of the 20th century.

== Selected filmography ==
=== Film ===
- Omoide no borero (1950)
- Atariya Kinpachi torimonochô: senri no tora (1950) - Oroku
- Hana no omokage (1950)
- Okusama ni goyojin (1950)
- Jonetsu no runba (1950)
- Waga ya wa tanoshi (1951) - Kaoko Fukuda, Namiko's sister
- Boyhood (1951) - Mrs. Yamazaki
- Inochi uruwashi (1951) - Tomie Honda
- Chichi Koishi(1951)
- Yôkina wataridori (1952) - Mitsuyo
- Kon'na watashi ja nakatta ni (1952) - Oryû
- Tôkyô madamu to Ôsaka fujin (1953)
- Tokyo Story (1953) - Oden-ya no onna
- Ojōsan shachō (1953) - Osugi Morikawa
- Kyûkon sannin musume (1954) - Madame at bar
- Izu no Odoriko (1954)
- Aishu nikki (1955) - Hama Katagiri
- Takekurabe (1955)
- Otôsan wa ohitoyoshi (1955) - Otsuko, second daughter
- Zoku kono yo no hana dairokubu: Tsuki no shirakaba dainanabu: Wakare no yomichi (1956)
- Koko ni sachi ari - Zempen: Yuwaku no miyako (1956, part 1, 2) - Reiko
- Yaji-kita dôchû (1956) - Omutsu
- Taiyô to bara (1956) - Sushi shop lady
- Tsuyu no atosaki (1956)
- Tokyo Twilight (1957)
- Times of Joy and Sorrow (1957)
- Shukin ryoko (1957)
- Toshigoro (1958)
- Hibi no haishin (1958)
- Nitôhei monogatari (1958-1959, part 1, 2)
- Equinox Flower (1958) - Akemi
- Sekishunchô (1959) - Kikutarô
- Good Morning (1959) - Oden'ya no Nyôbô
- High Teen (1959) - Tomiko, Hiroshi's mother
- Kaze no naka no hitomi (1959) - Nobuko, Miyazaki's mother
- Kiken ryoko (1959)
- Kyô mo mata kakute ari nan (1959) - Kansuirô maid
- Asu e no seiso (1959)
- Floating Weeds (1959) - O-Katsu
- Izu no odoriko (1960)
- Irohanihoheto (1960)
- Late Autumn (1960)
- Bushidô Muzan (1960) - Orin
- Zero Focus (1961)
- Netsuai sha (1961) - Bar's madame
- Onna no tsurihashi (1961, Serial) - Okane (Episode 1)
- Senkyaku banrai (1962)
- Kono ni uruwashi (1962)
- Akitsu onsen (1962)
- Hadashi no hanayome (1962)
- Yukiguni (1965) - Maid
- Ore tachi no koi (1965)
- Seishun no kotoba yori - Kaze ni kike kumo ni kike (1966) - Kayo Kashima
- Ohana han (1966) - Yoshi Okamoto
- Botchan (1966)
- Hi no ataru sakamichi (1967)
- Shinjuku no hada (1968) - Kura, Chiyo's mother
- Kigeki: Otoko wa aikyo (1970) - Kane
- Joshi gakuen: Warui asobi (1970) - Mitsuko Masuda
- Kigeki joshi gakusei: hanayakana chôsen (1975)
- Erimomisaki (1975) - Boarding House Landlady
- Oiran (1983) - O-Tatsu
- Sumo Do, Sumo Don't (1992) - Yuki Anayama
- Maborosi (1995) - Tomeno
- Give It All (1998) - Fuki Shinomura
- A Class to Remember 4: Fifteen (2000)
- Fune o oritara kanojo no shima (2002)
- Inu to arukeba: Chirori to Tamura (2004) - Tomi Furukawa
- Village Photobook (2004)
- Swing Girls (2004) - Tomoko's Grandmother (final film role)

=== Television ===
- Playgirl (1969) - Grandmother
- Mito Kōmon (1971–1985)
- Ōoka Echizen (1972–1978)
- The Water Margin (1973)
- G-Men '75 (1977)
- Princess Comet (1978–1979)
- Monkey (1978)
- Ōedo Sōsamō (1984)
- Space Sheriff Shaider (1984)
