= Unforgettable Trail =

1959 film

- Film poster
- Directed by: Koji Shima
- Written by: Miyuki Hasegawa; Koji Shima
- Produced by: Kazuyoshi Takeda
- Starring: Fujiko Yamamoto; Takayoshi Wanami; Kaoru Kuroiwa; Toranosuke Ogawa; Katsuhiko Kobayashi
- Cinematography: Joji Ohara
- Music by: Seitarō Ōmori
- Distributed by: Daiei Film
- Release date: 27 May 1959 (Japan)
- Running time: 100 minutes
- Country: Japan
- Language: Japanese

Unforgettable Trail (Japanese: いつか来た道, Hepburn: Itsuka kita michi), also known as The Path I Remember, is a 1959 Japanese drama film directed by Koji Shima. The film stars Fujiko Yamamoto, Toranosuke Ogawa, and Saburo Sakai. In addition to its Japanese theatrical release, the film was also shown in London and Canada. It was entered into the 1st Moscow International Film Festival.

== Cast ==
- Fujiko Yamamoto as Saya Ikeda
- Takayoshi Wanami as Minoru, Saya's brother
- Kaoru Kuroiwa as Miyo, Saya's sister
- Toranosuke Ogawa as Gentaro, Grandfather
- Katsuhiko Kobayashi as Jiro Ogura
- Akihiko Katayama as Tokio Noguchi
- Bontaro Miake as Dr. Inoue
- Yoshiro Kitahara as Ichikawa
