= Ringo-en no shōjo =

Ringo-en no shojo
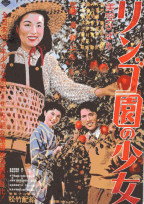
- Japanese movie poster
- Directed by: Koji Shima
- Written by: Ōsuke Agi (writer); Kimiyuki Hasegawa (screenplay and story); Fujio Ozawa screenplay and story); Bin Tatsuno (writer)
- Produced by: Michihito Fukushima; Sadao Sugihara
- Starring: Hibari Misora; Akihiko Katayama; Kokuten Kōdō; Yōko Kosono; Koji Mitsui
- Cinematography: Yuuharu Atsuta
- Edited by: Toshio Gotō
- Music by: Masao Yoneyama
- Production company: Shin Geijutsu Production
- Distributed by: Shochiku
- Release date: 20 November 1952 (Japan)
- Running time: 95 minutes
- Country: Japan
- Language: Japanese

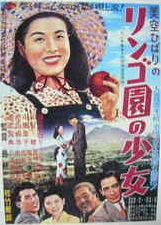
Alternate Japanese movie poster

Ringo-en no shōjo (Japanese: リンゴ園の少女, Hepburn: Ringo-en no shōjo; lit. "Girl of Apple Park") is a 1952 black and white Japanese film directed by Koji Shima.

The art director was Tomoo Shimogawara.

== Cast ==
- Hibari Misora as Marumi
- Akihiko Katayama
- Kokuten Kōdō
- Yōko Kosono as Yoko Kozono
- Koji Mitsui
- Hideaki Miura
- Bontarō Miyake as Bontaro Miake
- Zeko Nakamura as Zekō Nakamura
- Takeshi Sakamoto
- Isao Yamagata
- So Yamamura

== See also ==
- List of films in the public domain in the United States
