= Ken'ichi Enomoto =

Japanese comedian (1904–1970)

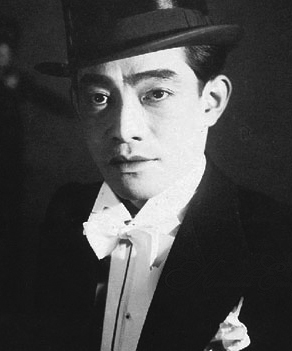
- Ken'ichi Enomoto
- Born: October 11, 1904; Aoyama, Tokyo, Japan
- Died: January 7, 1970 (aged 65)
- Other names: Enoken
- Occupations: Comedian, film and stage actor

Ken'ichi Enomoto (榎本 健一, Enomoto Ken'ichi; October 11, 1904 – January 7, 1970) was a popular Japanese singing comedian, mostly known by his stage name Enoken (エノケン).

A major innovator during his heyday, Enoken's stage shows, radio appearances, and film roles were a major influence within Tokyo theatre before World War II, and was a catalyst for the revival of comedy in the postwar period.

Born in Aoyama, Tokyo, the son of rice cracker shop owners, Enomoto fell under the spell of such stars of the Asakusa Opera as Taya Rikizo and Fujiwara Yoshie, and in 1922 he made his stage debut at age 18 as a chorus member of the Asakusa Kinryukan Theatre. The Great Kantō earthquake of the following year dealt a great blow to the opera world in Tokyo, at which time Enomoto shifted to comic theatre. Playing small roles in various comedy productions, he returned to the Asakusa stage in 1929 as part of the troupe Casino Folies. The following year saw him launch his own troupe, Enoken Gekidan, which would firmly establish him as a leading figure in Tokyo theatrical circles. In 1934, he starred in the movie Enoken no Seishun Suikoden (Enoken's Tale of Youth's Folly), and gained national popularity. His subsequent film career saw him parody a whole parade of Japanese historical personages, including Kondō Isami and Sakamoto Ryōma, in a series of "jidai-geki" (historical dramas) and "chanbara" (samurai drama) films, including some directed by Kajirō Yamamoto, Nobuo Nakagawa and Akira Kurosawa.

Enomoto became afflicted with necrosis of the right leg in the 1950s, which required amputation, curtailing his film and stage career. He did, however, make a legendary comeback at the Shinjuku Koma Theater 1963 wearing a prosthetic leg. He died in 1970, and is entombed in Hase Temple in Nishi-Azabu, Minato, Tokyo, on whose tombstone is inscribed "The King of Comedy".

== Selected filmography ==
- Musume jûhachi hanamukô shinan (1928)
- Enoken no Seishun Suikoden (1934)
- Enoken no majutsushi (1934)
- Enoken no Kondō Isami (エノケンの近藤勇) (1935) - Isami Kondô / Ryôma Sakamoto
- Enoken no donguri tonbee (1936)
- Enoken no senman chôja (1936) - Enoken
- Zoku Enoken no senman chôja (1936) - Enoken
- Enoken no edokko Santa (1936) - Santa
- Edokko Ken-chan (1937)
- Enoken no Chakkiri Kinta (エノケンのちゃっきり金太) (1937, part 1, 2) - Himself
- Enoken no Sarutobi Sasuke (Aryarya no maki) (1937, part 1, 2)
- Enoken no furaibo (1938)
- Enoken no hôkaibô (1938) - Hôkaibô
- Enoken no bikkuri jinsei (1938) - Enoken
- Enoken no gatchiri jidai (1939) - Enoken
- Enoken no kurama tengu (1939)
- Enoken no mori no Ishimatsu (1939)
- Enoken no ganbari senjutsu (1939) - Inada
- Enoken no yajikita (1939)
- Enoken no zangiri Kinta (1940)
- Enoken no homare no dohyôiri (1940)
- Enoken no wanwan taishô (1940)
- Songoku 1 (1940)
- Songoku 2 (1940)
- Enoken no songokū: songokū zenko-hen (1940) - Son Goku
- Enoken Torazô no shumpû senri (1941)
- Enoken no Kinta uridasu (1941) - Himself
- Matte ita otoko (1942)
- Suiko den (1942)
- Isogawa Heisuke kômyô-banashi (1942)
- Hyoroku yume-monogatari (1943) - Hyoroku Oishi
- Idaten kaido (1944)
- San-jaku sagohei (1944) - 'Three-Footer' Sagohei
- Appare Isshin Tasuke (1945)
- Shôri no hi made (1945)
- Koi no fuunjî (1945) - Kinsuke
- Utae! Taiyô (1945)
- The Men Who Tread on the Tiger's Tail (1945) - Porter
- Jinsei tonbo gaeri (1946)
- Toho Show Boat (1946)
- Mukoirî gokasen (1947)
- Yottsu no koi no monogatari (1947) - Kin-chan (episode 3)
- Kyûjukyû niume no hanayome (1947)
- Shin baka jidai (1947, part 1, 2)
- Basha monogatari (1948)
- Enoken no bikkuri shakkuri jidai (1948)
- Enoken no homurano (1948)
- Utau Enoken torimonochou (1948)
- Enoken no kentokyo ichidai ki (1949)
- Enoken no Tobisuke bôken ryokô (1949) - Tobisuke
- Enoken Kasagi no Osome Hisamatsu (1949)
- Tokyo Kid (東京キッド) (1950) - The fortune teller
- Enoken no happyakuya-danuki ôabare (1950)
- Enoken no tenichibo (1950)
- Enoken no sokonuke daihōsō (エノケンの底抜け大放送) (1950)
- Umon torimonochô: Katame ookami (1951) - Kinzaemon Kinokuniya
- Gokuraku rokkasen (1951)
- Okaru Kanpei (1952) - Kenichi Hanemoto
- Kin no tamago: Golden girl (1952)
- Tonchinkan-Mitsu no uta (1952)
- Rankugo nagaya ha hana zakari (1954)
- Rakugo series - Dai ichi-wa: Rakugo nagaya wa hanazakari (1954) - Hachigorô
- Natsu matsuri rakugochoyo (1954)
- Rankugo nagaya obake sodo (1954)
- Enoken no tengoku to jigoku (1954)
- Hatsuwarai sokonuke tabi nikki (1955)
- Yancha musume gyojoki (1955)
- Hanayome rikkohô (1955)
- Owarai torimonocho-hatchan hatsutegara (1955)
- Muttsuri Umon torimonocho (1955)
- Masura o hashutsu fukai (1956)
- Ôabare Cha-Cha musume (1956)
- Gokuraku ôichiza (1956, part 1, 2) - Ken'nosuke Nakamura
- Takarashima sendai (1956)
- Gokurakuto monogatari (1957)
- Nitôhei monogatari: Aa senyû no maki (1958)
- The Three Treasures (1959) - God of Yaoyorozu
- Rankugô tengoko shinshiroku (1960)
- Storm Over the Pacific (1960)
- Dare yori-mo kane o aisu (1961)
- Kanpai! Gokigen yarou (1961)
- Jirocho shacho to Ishimatsuhain: Ifu dodo (1962)
- Kigeki: Danchi oyabun (1962)
- Todan Goro ichiza (1963)
- Hana no o-Edo no hôkaibô (1965) - The first Hokaibo (final film role)
