= Wakaki hi wa kanashi =

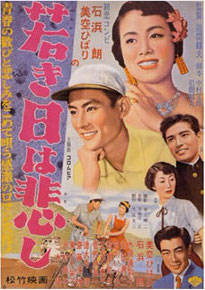
- Japanese movie poster
- Directed by: Tsuruo Iwama
- Produced by: Shōchiku
- Release date: September 29, 1954
- Country: Japan
- Language: Japanese

Wakaki hi wa kanashi (若き日は悲し) is a 1954 black-and-white Japanese film directed by Tsuruo Iwama.

== Cast ==
- Hibari Misora
