= Futari no hitomi =

1952 Japanese film

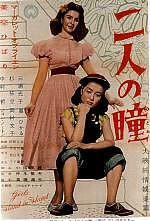
- 1952 Japanese movie poster
- Directed by: Shigeo Nakaki
- Written by: Hideo Oguni
- Cinematography: Michio Takahashi
- Distributed by: Daiei Film
- Release dates: October 23, 1952; 1953 (U.S.)
- Running time: 81 minutes
- Country: Japan
- Language: Japanese

Futari no hitomi (二人の瞳, Futari no hitomi; The Eyes of Two People) a.k.a. Girls Hand in Hand (USA title) is a 1952 black-and-white Japanese film directed by Shigeo Nakaki.

== Plot ==
A girl visits her dad in Japan, and she makes friends with an orphan from the war. She then tries to raise money to make an orphanage.

== Cast ==
- Hibari Misora as Maria Abe
- Hikaru Hoshi
- Mitsuko Miura
- Tetsu Nakamura
- John Norton
- Margaret O'Brien
- Shiko Saito
- Nobuko Shingu
- Kyoji Sugi
- Yuko Tashiro
- Eiran Yoshikawa

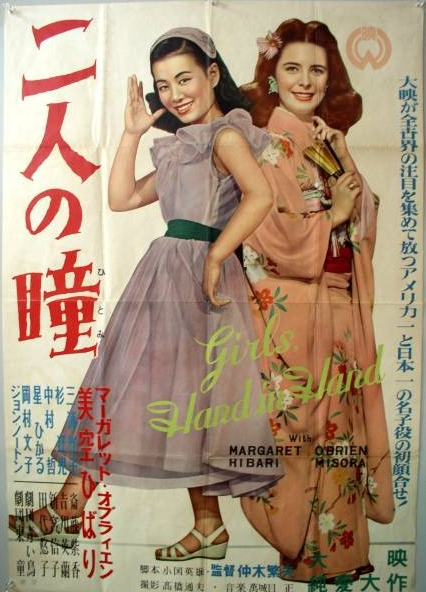
1953 Japanese movie poster for Futari no hitomi.

== See also ==
- List of films in the public domain in the United States
