= Peach Boy =

2019 musical

Peach Boy is a musical with book and lyrics by Tony Pinizzotto, and original music by Phil Luna, based on the 200 year-old Japanese fairytale of Momotarō, The Peach Boy. After a 2019 stage reading Production, the musical’s goal for a workshop production was halted in 2020, due to the ongoing COVID-19 pandemic.

== Productions ==
=== Stage Reading Production ===
The musical premiered as a Stage Reading Production on July 2, 2019 at the Lonny Chapman Theater in North Hollywood, Los Angeles California. It sold-out its weekend run, with the hopes of show revisions and further advancement to the level of a Workshop Production. The production was directed by Hisato Masuyama and featured orchestrations by its composer Phil Luna. It featured Kevin Hoffman Jr. as Momotarō, Danielle Miyazaki as Hōseki, Keiko Clark as Haha, Paul Cady as Kyūjo-sha, Jennifer Strattan as Rin-Jin, Lloyd Pedersen as The Evil Ogre, Andrew Grigorian as Inu Suppotto the dog, Noi Maeshige as Hangu the monkey, Beccy Quinn as Kiji the pheasant, and Doug Haverty as Host/Stage Directions. The show was produced by The Group Rep Theatre.

=== Original Cast Demo Recording ===
In August 2020 “Peach Boy – A New Musical: Original Cast Demo Recording” was released on all streaming platforms including Roku, iTunes, and Amazon music It is a complete studio recording of all the songs from the show.

== Synopsis ==
=== Act One ===
There once was a Japanese woodcutter named Kyūjo-sha and his wife Haha who wanted nothing more than to have a child, but they could not. They prayed to the Gods and Buddha to bless them with a child. Years prior their town was ransacked by The Ogre King and his evil Oni tribe, stealing all their possessions. One day while Haha was down at the stream washing her clothes she saw a huge peach floating down the river. She lassoed it and brought it home to Kyūjo-sha. They cut it open and a baby boy popped out. They named him Momotarō, Japanese for “first born of the Peach” (“Overture/Intro Story”).

Hōseki, while in the Aikō-ka temple for her Genpuku, prays to her father who was killed at sea in a fishing accident. She plays a tune and sings from her ocarina necklace, the only thing found of her father’s when he was lost at sea ("Cherry Blossom (Hōseki’s Lullaby)"). Momotarō comes into the temple and while professing his love for her, asks Hōseki to run away with him and explore the world (“Love Was Right Here All Along”). On her way home from the temple a storm arises. It gets very late and Hōseki gets lost. In the woods she meets an old man who tries to help her (“Without Me”). The old man turns out to be The Ogre King, the evil Oni. He puts a spell on Hōseki and kidnaps her.

The next day Momotarō returns to Aikō-ka Temple to start his journey with Hōseki, but instead finds Hōseki’s mother, Rin-Jin. Rin-Jin tells Momotarō that she is there looking for Hōseki because she never returned home the night prior, and fears she was kidnapped. All that was found in the woods was her late husband’s ocarina and a swatch of clothing with a crest on it. She blames Momotarō for the demise of Hōseki. Momotarō vows to rescue Hōseki (“My Word of Honor”). When Momotarō returns home to pack for his journey he learns that the crest is that of The Ogre King. He now knows he must travel afar to Ogre Island to rescue Hōseki, defeat the Oni, and return with her and the riches The Ogre King stole from the village so many years ago (“My Word of Honor (Reprise)”).

Momotarō begins his long journey (“Oh, What A Day!”), and on the way meets A spotted dog named Inu Suppotto (“Your New Best Friend”), and a monkey named Hangu (“Your New Best Friend (Hangu Reprise)”). They join him on his journey, vowing to help him defeat the Oni. Meanwhile, Rin-Jin and Haha lament over their missed children, praying for their safe return (“Where You Come From”). Momotarō, Inu and Hangu meet Kiji an elegant green female pheasant who joins them on their journey (“Your New Best Friend (Kiji Reprise)”). Kiji leads them to a ship to sail the Sea-Narrows of Lost Souls to Ogre Island. They battle the rough sea with hopes of a safe arrival (“When Will This Be Done?”).

=== Act Two ===
After the friends arrive they settle into their camp. In an effort to muster up courage for the animals Momotarō retells the bedtime story Kyū-jo Sha would read him often about a brave soldier who battles a seven headed dragon (“Susanoo And the Dragon”). The next morning Momotarō and his friends sneak up on the Ogre’s camp and cave only to find The Ogre King, but no Oni tribe. A battle ensues (“Fighting The Ogre”). Momotarō and his friends do their best, but are defeated and thrown into a jail cell in the ogre’s cave next to a cell holding Hōseki.

When Momotarō wakes up he signals to Hōseki, saying although he failed, he brought Hōseki her necklace. They are confronted by the ogre. Momotarō offers himself in Hōseki’s place if the ogre will release her. The Ogre King agrees. He allows them to say one last goodbye to each other (“Cherry Blossom (Reprise)”). As Hōseki plays the ocarina and sings, her song renders the ogre helpless, putting him to sleep. While the ogre is disabled, Momotarō and the crew tie up the ogre and gather his riches. They all return to his village (“Victory Triumphant”). The return of Momotarō, Hōseki and the animals are celebrated. The Ogre King awakens and apologizes to Hōseki and her mother. When the apology is made the ogre transforms into a human being, and the families realize he is Rin-Jin’s long lost husband, Hōseki’s father. (“Ogre Transformation/Susanoo and the Dragon (Reprise)”). He tells of an evil sea witch who cast a spell on him, turning him into an ogre. Momotarō asks Hōseki’s parents for her hand in marriage and they agree. They all live happily ever after (“Love Was Right Here All Along (Reprise)”).

== Musical numbers ==
=== Stage reading, Los Angeles, California ===
All songs are composed by Phil Luna, with lyrics by Tony Pinizzotto.

Act I

- "Overture/Intro Story" – Company
- "Cherry Blossom (Hōseki’s Lullaby)" – Hōseki
- "Love Was Right Here All Along" – Momotarō, Hōseki
- "Without Me" – Hōseki, The Ogre King
- "My Word of Honor" – Momotarō
- "My Word of Honor (Reprise)” - Momotarō
- "Oh, What a Day!" † – Momotarō
- "Your New Best Friend" – Momotarō, Inu Suppotto
- "Your New Best Friend (Hangu Reprise)" – Momotarō, Inu Suppotto, Hangu
- "Where You Come From" – Haha, Rin-Jin
- "Your New Best Friend (Kiji Reprise)" – Momotarō, Inu Suppotto, Hangu, Kiji
- "When Will This Be Done?" – Momotarō, Inu Suppotto, Hangu, Kiji, Kyūjo-Sha, Haha

Act II

- "Susanoo and the Dragon"† – Momotarō, Kyūjo-Sha, Haha
- "Fighting the Ogre" – Orchestra
- "Cherry Blossom (Hōseki’s Lullaby – Reprise)" – Momotarō, Hōseki
- "Victory Triumphant" – Orchestra
- "Ogre Transformation/Susanoo and the Dragon (Reprise)" – The Ogre King
- "Finale/Love Was Right Here All Along (Reprise)" – Momotarō, Hōseki, Company

† Differs from its order on the Original Cast Demo Recording

== Cast ==
Character	Los Angeles California Stage Reading 2019 2019	Original Cast Demo Recording 2020
Momotarō	Danielle Miyazaki	Danielle Miyazaki
Hōseki	Kevin Hoffman Jr.	Philip Alimoren
Kyūjo-Sha	Paul Cady	Paul Cady
Haha	Keiko Clark	Keiko Clark
Rin-Jin	Jennifer Strattan	Jennifer Strattan
The Ogre King	Lloyd Pedersen	Milton Porter
Inu Suppotto	Andrew Grigorian	Mike Estrada
Hangu	Noi Maeshige	Tiffany Churchill
Kiji	Beccy Quinn	Beccy Quinn
Narrator/Host	Doug Haverty	Milton Porter
Mysterious Child’s Voice	Chihiro Kato	Chihiro Kato
