= Odoroki ikka =

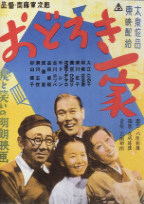
- Japanese movie poster
- Directed by: Torajiro Saito
- Produced by: Ōizumi Films
- Music by: Yuji Koseki
- Release date: 13 December 1949
- Country: Japan
- Language: Japanese

Odoroki ikka (おどろき一家) is a 1949 black-and-white Japanese film directed by Torajiro Saito.

== Cast ==
- Hibari Misora
- Takako Irie (入江たか子)
- Harume Tone (利根はる恵)
- Nijiko Kiyokawa (清川虹子)
- Achako Hanabishi (花菱アチャコ)
- Shintarō Kido (木戸新太郎 / キドシン)
- Robba Furukawa (古川ロッパ)
- Kiiton Masuda (益田喜頓)
- Atsushi Watanabe (渡辺篤)
- Tamae Kiyokawa (清川玉枝)
- Yoshiko Sugiyama (杉山美子)
- and others

== See also ==
- List of films in the public domain in the United States
