= Ojōsan shachō =

1953 Japanese film

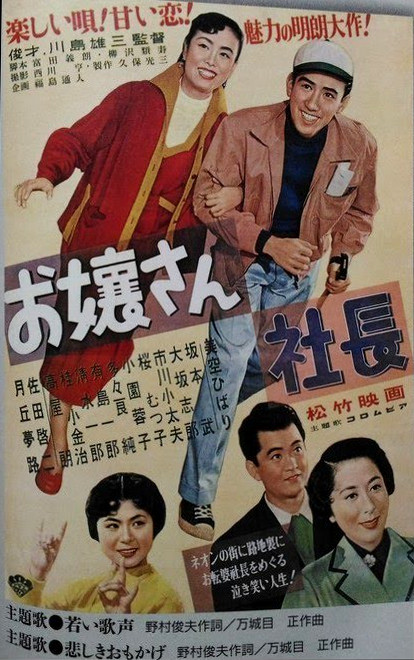
- Japanese movie poster
- Directed by: Yūzō Kawashima
- Written by: Yoshirō Tomita; Ruiju Yanagisawa
- Produced by: Kōzō Kubo
- Starring: Hibari Misora; Ichirō Arishima; Keiji Sada; Yumeji Tsukioka
- Cinematography: Toru Nishikawa
- Edited by: Masao Saito
- Music by: Tadashi Manjōme
- Production company: Shochiku
- Release date: 29 December 1953 (Japan)
- Running time: 93 minutes
- Country: Japan
- Language: Japanese

Ojōsan shachō (Japanese: お嬢さん社長; lit. "Madame Company President") is a 1953 Japanese musical film directed by Yūzō Kawashima and starring Hibari Misora.

== Cast ==
- Hibari Misora as Madoka Ohara
- Ichirō Arishima as Tetsutaro Kaitani
- Keiji Sada as Goro Akiyama
- Yumeji Tsukioka as Yumiko Kaitani
- Takeshi Sakamoto as Ippachi Sakurakawa
- Mutsuko Sakura as Osugi Morikawa
- Takiko Egawa as musical actress
- Kodayu Ichikawa as Juzaburo Ohara
- Kokinji Katsura as Sanpachi Sakurakawa
- Shōichi Kofujita as Mr. O
- Yōko Kosono as Kikuko Morikawa
- Tatsuo Nagai as Mito
- Shinyo Nara as a tutor Sugiura
- Shirō Osaka as Keigo Namiki
- Ichirō Shimizu as Senzo Akakura
- Akira Takaya as Gamaroku
- Norikazu Takeda as Matsuzo Morikawa
- Jun Tatara as Yasuda
