= Odoru Ryūgūjō =

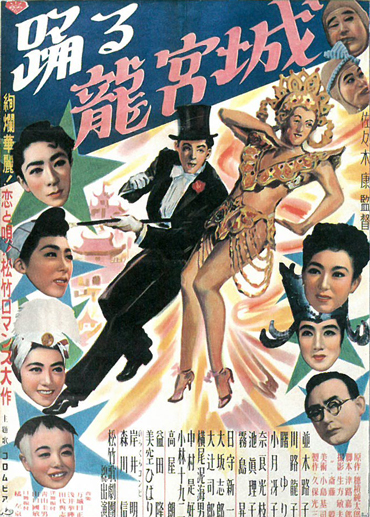
- Japanese movie poster
- Directed by: Yasushi Sasaki
- Written by: Juntarō Hozumi (story); Yoshiro Tsuji (screenplay)
- Produced by: Shochiku
- Music by: Takaaki Asai; Tadashi Manjome; Yoshi Tashiro
- Release date: July 26, 1949
- Country: Japan
- Language: Japanese

Odoru Ryūgūjō (踊る龍宮城; literally "Dancing Dragon Palace") is a 1949 black and white Japanese film directed by Yasushi Sasaki.

== Cast ==
- Hibari Misora
- Masuda Takashi
