= Hibari no kanashiki hitomi =

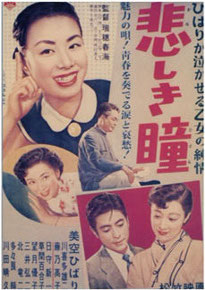
- Japanese movie poster
- Directed by: Mizuho Shunkai
- Produced by: Shochiku
- Release date: August 19, 1953
- Country: Japan
- Language: Japanese

Hibari no kanashiki hitomi (ひばりの悲しき瞳) is a 1953 black-and-white Japanese film directed by Mizuho Shunkai.

== Cast ==
- Hibari Misora
