= Akogare no Hawaii Kōro =

- Directed by: Torajiro Saito
- Produced by: Shintoho
- Release date: April 1, 1950
- Running time: 78 minutes
- Country: Japan
- Language: Japanese

Akogare no Hawaii Kōro (憧れのハワイ航路)

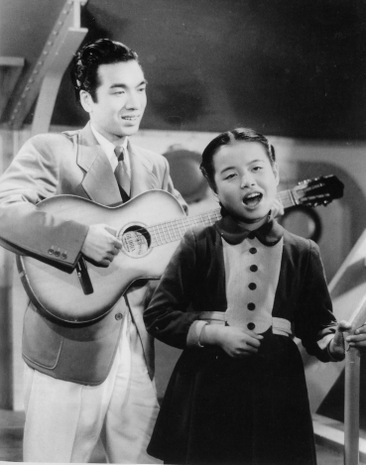
Hibari Misora and Haruo Oka in Akogare no Hawaii kōro

is a 1950 black-and-white Japanese film directed by Torajiro Saito.

== Cast ==
- Haruo Oka
- Hibari Misora
- Sanae Ijita (柴田早苗)
- Mitsuko Yoshikawa
- Tamae Kiyokawa (清川玉枝)
- Achako Hanabishi (花菱アチャコ)
- Shintarō Kido
- Robba Furukawa (古川緑波/古川ロッパ)

== See also ==
- List of films in the public domain in the United States
