= Nodo jimankyō jidai =

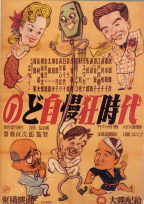
- Japanese movie poster
- Directed by: Torajiro Saito
- Written by: Hachirō Satō (story); Toshio Yasumi (writer)
- Produced by: Tokyo Eiga Co Ltd.
- Release date: March 28, 1949
- Running time: 80 minutes now 50 minutes
- Country: Japan
- Language: Japanese

Nodo jimankyō jidai (のど自慢狂時代) is a 1949 black-and-white Japanese film directed by Torajiro Saito.

== Cast ==
- Hibari Misora

== See also ==
- List of films in the public domain in the United States
