= Tokyo Kid =

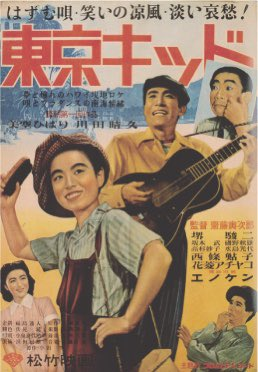
- Japanese movie poster
- Directed by: Torajiro Saito
- Written by: Akira Fushimi (writer); Kihan Nagase (story)
- Produced by: Shochiku; Takashi Koide (producer)
- Cinematography: Hiroyuki Nagaoka
- Music by: Tadashi Manjome
- Release date: September 9, 1950
- Running time: 81 minutes
- Country: Japan
- Language: Japanese

Tokyo Kid (東京キッド) is a 1950 black-and-white Japanese film musical comedy and drama directed by Torajiro Saito.

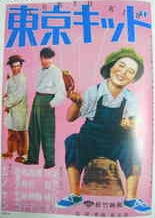
Japanese movie poster

== Cast ==
- Hibari Misora as an orphan Mariko Tanimoto
- Haruhisa Kawata (川田晴久) as the street musician Sanpei
- Shunji Sakai (堺駿二) as Sanpei's pal Shin-chan
- Taeko Takasugi (高杉妙子)
- Ayuko Saijō (西條鮎子)
- Achako Hanabishi (花菱アチャコ) as Koichi Tanimoto, Mariko's father
- Kenichi Enomoto (榎本健一) as the fortune teller
- and others

== See also ==
- List of films in the public domain in the United States
