= The Sad Whistle =

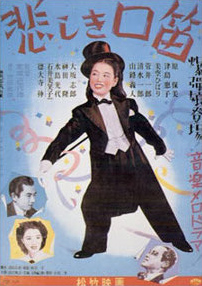
- Film poster
- Directed by: Miyoji Ieki
- Starring: Yasumi Hara; Hibari Misora
- Release date: 19 October 1949 (Japan)
- Running time: 110 minutes
- Country: Japan
- Language: Japanese

The Sad Whistle (Japanese: 悲しき口笛, Hepburn: Kanashiki Kuchibue) is a 1949 Japanese drama film directed by Miyoji Ieki.

== Cast ==
- Yasumi Hara – Kenzo Tanaka
- Mieko Ishii
- Takashi Kanda – Yamaguchi
- Hibari Misora – Mitsuko Tanaka
- Mitsuyo Mizushima
- Ichiro Shimizu
- Ichiro Sugai
- Shin Tokudaiji – Yoshimura
- Keiko Tsushima
- Yoshindo Yamaji – Yasuda

== Casting ==
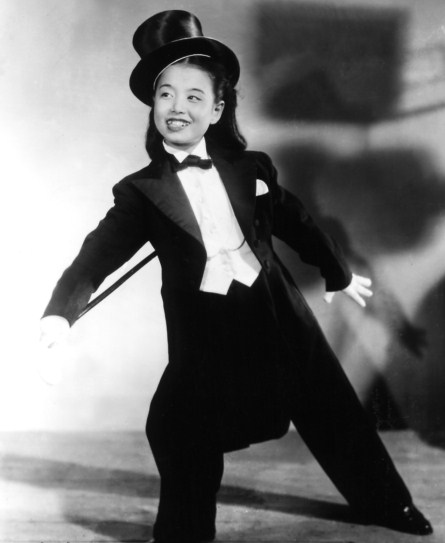
Hibari Misora in The Sad Whistle

Hibari, after her controversial prepubescent years, was therefore "publicly criticized for her blatant eroticism", and that is when she was offered the leading role in 1949 drama The Sorrowful Whistle by Miyoji Ieki. As stated by Shamon, this transformation (from disruptive and risqué to conservative and chaste) occurred in Hibari's first starring role, in the film Sorrowful Whistle, which dramatizes an uneasy reconciliation of a childlike Hibari with her previous adult stage persona. The film achieves this by casting Hibari as a war orphan and emphasizing her innocence while at the same time showcasing her talent at singing by making the climax of the plot her stage performance of the song "Sorrowful Whistle" in a tuxedo and top hat, an outfit reminiscent of her scandalous stage career. The way Hibari's performance of the song is reconciled within the film highlights the larger process of how her image was repackaged as childlike and innocent.

== Story ==
The film Sorrowful Whistle or The Sad Whistle, domesticates the eroticism of the song by altering the meaning of the lyric about sexual love between adults into familial love between brother and sister. In the film, Hibari plays a young war orphan, Tanaka Mitsuko, searching for her older brother Kenzō (Hara Yasumi), a repatriated soldier. Within the diegesis of the film, Kenzō, a composer, teaches his unpublished song "Sorrowful Whistle" to his little sister Mitsuko before he leaves for the front. The song becomes a token of love between them and the means by which they hope to find each other. Mitsuko sings the song constantly throughout the film; however, she only sings the second verse, about parting and meeting again. When she speaks of her brother, she tearfully repeats the line "we'll meet again someday" (itsuka mata au), firmly tying the song's message to the central conflict of the film: her separation from her brother. In this way, the film contains the sexuality of the song by changing its message from sexual to familial love, a theme appropriate to an eleven-year-old girl.

As a character, Mitsuko undergoes changes on several levels: from war orphan to happy child in a new family and from tomboy to feminine girl. These changes underscore the transformation of Hibari, the actress, from freakish stage act to mainstream film star and from child celebrity to national symbol of proper Japanese girlhood. During this process, her imitation of adults is contained but still never disappears entirely. At the start of the film, Mitsuko is homeless, dressed as a boy, and living by the docks in Yokohama with day laborers. An itinerant violinist named Fujikawa and his adult daughter find and adopt her, although they too live in dire poverty. The Fujikawas teach her to dress and act like a girl, but Mitsuko's rehabilitation cannot be complete until she is reunited with her brother, Kenzō. In the film's climax, Kenzō finally finds Mitsuko as she is performing "Sorrowful Whistle" onstage in a nightclub, and the song itself becomes the token by which he knows her. He rushes toward the stage, and when Mitsuko sees him, she runs off the stage toward him.

Rather than laughing or shouting, they embrace and she sobs violently. In this moment of reunion, Hibari stands in for the thousands of women and girls who in 1949 were still waiting for brothers, fathers, and husbands who would never return home from the war. Hibari's performance elevates the film from mere star vehicle to an expression of national grief and suffering. In the end, a new family is formed: Kenzō has coincidentally met and fallen in love with Fujikawa's daughter, and the young couple become surrogate parents for Mitsuko.

The image of innocent girlhood at the end of the film overshadows but does not completely erase the suggestion of Hibari's controversial stage persona, which still appears at some moments in Sorrowful Whistle.

== Music ==
The single with the title song became a bestselling record for Hibari Misora, selling more than 45 million copies in Japan.
