= Hibari no komoriuta =

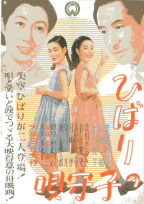
- Japanese movie poster
- Directed by: Koji Shima
- Written by: Ichiro Watanabe
- Based on: Lisa and Lottie by Erich Kästner
- Music by: Tadashi Manjome
- Distributed by: Daiei Film
- Release date: September 21, 1951 (Japan)
- Running time: 81 minutes
- Country: Japan
- Language: Japanese

Hibari no komoriuta (Japanese: ひばりの子守唄; lit. "Hibari's Lullaby") is a 1951 black-and-white Japanese film directed by Koji Shima. The movie is based on Lisa and Lottie (German: Das doppelte Lottchen), a 1949 novel by Erich Kästner, which was later adapted as the 1961 film The Parent Trap.

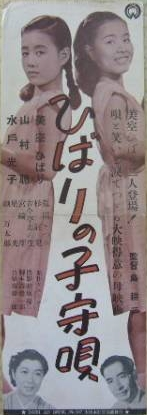
1951 Japanese movie poster

== Cast ==
- Hibari Misora (美空 ひばり)
- So Yamamura (山村聡)
- Mitsuko Mito (水戸光子)
- Satsuki Arakawa (荒川さつき)
- Kyōji Sugi (杉狂児)
- Shinshō Kokontei (古今亭志ん生)
- Jun Miyazaki (宮崎準)
- Hikaru Hoshi (星光)
- Mantarō Ushio (潮万太郎)

== See also ==
- List of films in the public domain in the United States
