= Hōrō no utahime =

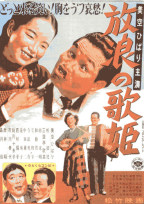
- Japanese movie poster
- Directed by: Tetsuo Ichikawa
- Produced by: Shochiku
- Release date: April 8, 1955
- Country: Japan
- Language: Japanese

Hōrō no utahime (放浪の歌姫; literally "The Wandering Songstress") is a 1955 black-and-white Japanese film directed by Tetsuo Ichikawa.

== Cast ==
- Hibari Misora
- Kyōji Sugi
- Kashō Sanyūtei
- Toshiaki Minami
- Kan'ichi Katō
- 室修平
- Yūsaku Terashima
- Kōji Nakata
- Eiko Taki
- Yōko Wakasugi
- Toshiko Ayukawa
- Haruyo Ichikawa
- Akira Kishii
- Shin Morikawa
