= Tonbo gaeri dōchū =

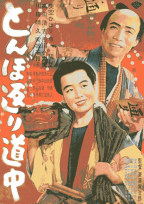
- Japanese movie poster
- Directed by: Torajiro Saito
- Produced by: Shochiku
- Release date: December 31, 1950
- Country: Japan
- Language: Japanese

Tonbo gaeri dōchū (とんぼ返り道中) is a 1950 black-and-white Japanese film directed by Torajiro Saito.

== Cast ==
- Hibari Misora

== See also ==
- List of films in the public domain in the United States
