= Shichihenge tanuki goten =

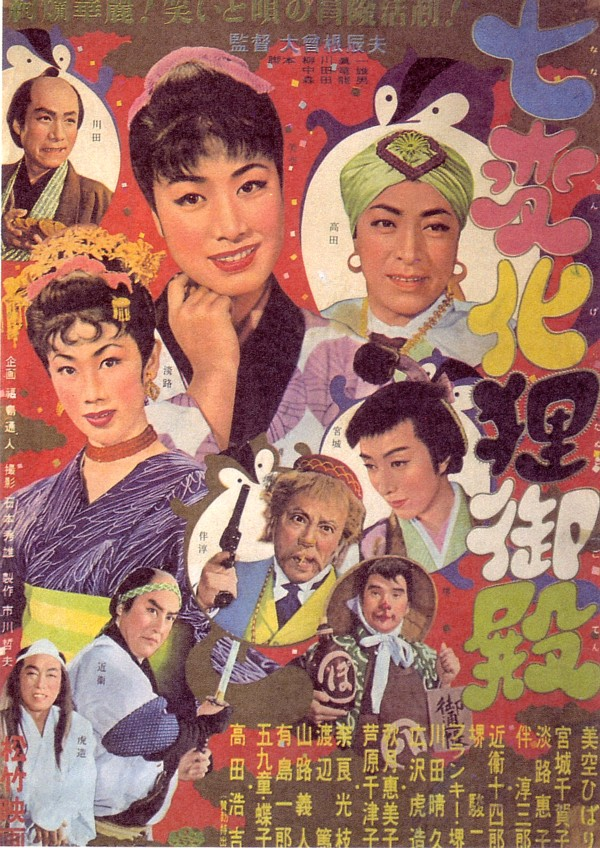
- Japanese movie poster
- Directed by: Tatsuo Ohsone
- Written by: Tatsuo Nakada (writer); Shinichi Yanagawa (writer)
- Produced by: Shochiku
- Cinematography: Hideo Ishimoto
- Music by: Tadashi Manjome
- Release date: 29 December 1954
- Running time: 101 minutes
- Country: Japan
- Language: Japanese

Shichihenge tanuki goten (七変化狸御殿), lit. "Quick Change Tanuki Palace"), is a 1954 black-and-white Japanese film directed by Tatsuo Ohsone.

== Cast ==
- Hibari Misora
- Shunji Sakai
- Chizuko Ashihara
- Chikako Miyagi
- Kōkichi Takada
- Ichirō Arishima as Yamizaemon
- Frankie Sakai
