= Akireta musume-tachi =

1949 film

- Directed by: Torajiro Saito
- Produced by: Shintoho
- Release date: October 10, 1949
- Running time: 83 minutes or 61 minutes
- Country: Japan
- Language: Japanese

Akireta musume-tachi (あきれた娘たち), alternate title: Kingorō no kodakara sōdō (金語楼の子宝騒動), is a 1949 black and white Japanese film directed by Torajiro Saito.

== Cast ==
- Kingorou Yanagiya (柳家金語楼)
- Achako Hanabishi (花菱アチャコ)
- (月丘千秋)
- (久我美子)
- (堀雄二)
- (江戸川蘭子)
- Hibari Misora (美空ひばり)
- (田中春男)
- Shintarō Kido (木戸新太郎 / キドシン)
- (飯田蝶子)
- (浦辺粂子)
- Nijiko Kiyokawa (清川虹子)

== See also ==
- List of films in the public domain in the United States
