= List of compositions by Elmer Bernstein =

Elmer Bernstein discography
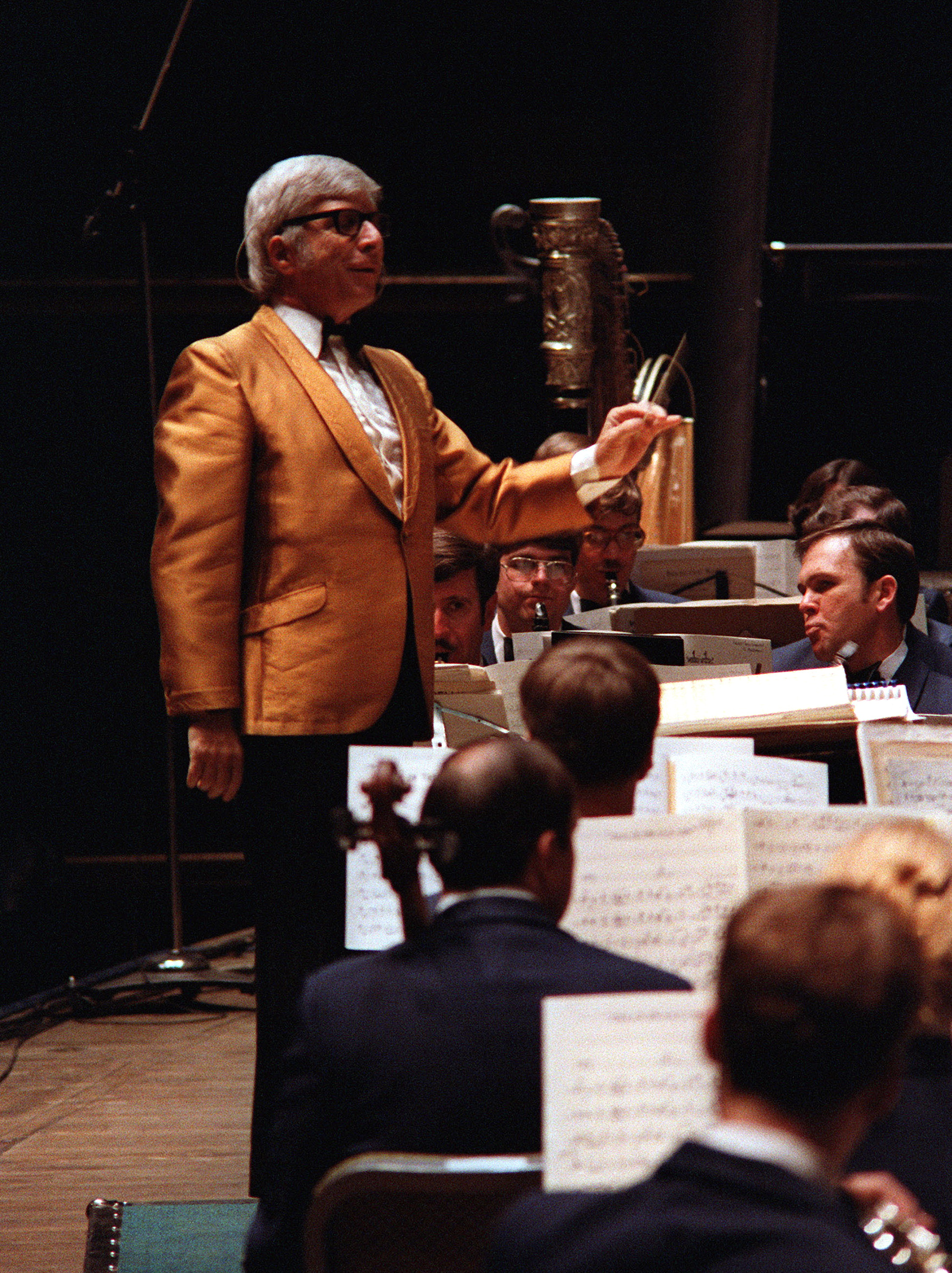
- Soundtrack albums: 245
- Compilation albums: 174
- Singles: 4

This is a list of compositions by composer, orchestrator and conductor Elmer Bernstein.

He composed and arranged scores for over 100 film scores including: Sudden Fear (1952), The Man with the Golden Arm (1955), The Ten Commandments (1956), Sweet Smell of Success (1957), The Magnificent Seven (1960), To Kill a Mockingbird (1962), The Great Escape (1963), Hud (1963), Thoroughly Modern Millie (1967), True Grit (1969), Ghostbusters (1984), The Black Cauldron (1985), The Grifters (1990), Cape Fear (1991) and Far from Heaven (2002).

== Filmography ==
Source: Turner Classic Movies

=== 1950s ===
Year	Title	Director
1951	Saturday's Hero	
1952	Battles of Chief Pontiac	
1952	Sudden Fear	
1953	Cat-Women of the Moon	
1953	Never Wave at a WAC	
1953	Robot Monster	
1954	Silent Raiders	
1955	The Eternal Sea	
1955	The Man with the Golden Arm	
1955	The View from Pompey's Head	
1956	The Ten Commandments	
1957	Men in War	
1957	Drango	
1957	Fear Strikes Out	
1957	Sweet Smell of Success	
1957	The Tin Star	
1958	Desire Under the Elms	
1958	Kings Go Forth	
1958	God's Little Acre	
1958	The Buccaneer	
1958	Some Came Running	
1959	The Miracle	

=== 1960s ===
Year	Title	Director	Latest release
1960	The Story on Page One		
1960	The Magnificent Seven	John Sturges	Quartet Records / QR508 / 2022
1960	The Rat Race		
1960	From the Terrace		
1961	The Comancheros		
1961	By Love Possessed		
1961	The Young Doctors		
1961	Summer and Smoke		
1962	Walk on the Wild Side	Edward Dmytryk	Intrada Special Collection / Volume 262 / 2014
1962	Birdman of Alcatraz	John Frankenheimer	
1962	To Kill a Mockingbird	Robert Mulligan	Intrada Special Collection / Volume 262 / 2014
1962	A Girl Named Tamiko	John Sturges	
1963	Kings of the Sun		
1963	The Caretakers		
1963	The Great Escape		
1963	Love with the Proper Stranger		
1963	Hud		
1964	The World of Henry Orient	George Roy Hill	
1964	The Carpetbaggers	Edward Dmytryk	Intrada Special Collection / Volume 262 / 2014
1965	The Sons of Katie Elder		
1965	The Hallelujah Trail		
1965	Baby the Rain Must Fall		
1966	7 Women		
1966	The Silencers		
1966	Cast A Giant Shadow		
1966	Hawaii		
1966	Return of the Seven	Burt Kennedy	Quartet Records / QR508 / 2022
1967	Thoroughly Modern Millie		
1968	The Scalphunters	Sydney Pollack	Quartet Records / QR500 / 2022
1968	I Love You, Alice B. Toklas		
1968	Powers of Ten		
1969	Guns of the Magnificent Seven	Paul Wendkos	Quartet Records / QR508 / 2022
1969	True Grit		
1969	The Bridge at Remagen		
1969	The Gypsy Moths		

=== 1970s ===
Year	Title	Director	Latest Release
1970	The Liberation of L.B. Jones		
1970	Cannon for Cordoba		
1970	A Walk in the Spring Rain		
1971	Big Jake		
1971	Doctors' Wives		
1971	See No Evil		
1972	The Amazing Mr. Blunden		
1973	Cahill U.S. Marshal		
1973	The Magnificent Seven Ride!	George McCowan	Quartet Records / QR508 / 2022
1974	Gold		
1974	McQ		
1974	Nightmare Honeymoon		
1974	The Trial of Billy Jack		
1975	Mr Quilp		
1975	Report to the Commissioner		
1976	From Noon Till Three		
1976	The Incredible Sarah		
1976	The Shootist		
1977	Billy Jack Goes to Washington		
1977	Slap Shot		
1977	Powers of Ten		
1978	National Lampoon's Animal House		
1978	Bloodbrothers		
1978	Casey's Shadow	rejected score, replaced by Patrick Williams	
1979	Zulu Dawn		
1979	The Great Santini		
1979	Meatballs		

=== 1980s ===
Year	Title	Director	Notes
1980	Airplane!	David Zucker, Jim Abrahams, Jerry Zucker	
1980	The Blues Brothers	John Landis	"God Music" composer only
1980	Saturn 3	Stanley Donen	
1981	Heavy Metal	Gerald Potterton	Bernstein's first score for an animated film
1981	Honky Tonk Freeway		
1981	Going Ape!		
1981	The Chosen		
1981	An American Werewolf in London	John Landis	
1981	Stripes	Ivan Reitman	
1982	Genocide		
1982	Five Days One Summer		
1982	Our House		
1982	Airplane II: The Sequel	Ken Finkleman	
1983	Michael Jackson's Thriller		
1983	Class		
1983	Trading Places	John Landis	
1983	Spacehunter: Adventures in the Forbidden Zone		
1984	Prince Jack		
1984	Marie Ward		
1984	Bolero		
1984	Ghostbusters	Ivan Reitman	
1985	The Black Cauldron	Ted Berman; Richard Rich	
1985	Spies Like Us	John Landis	
1985	The Journey of Natty Gann	rejected score, replaced by James Horner	
1986	¡Three Amigos!	John Landis	
1986	Legal Eagles	Ivan Reitman	
1987	Leonard Part 6		
1987	Amazing Grace and Chuck		
1988	Funny Farm	George Roy Hill	
1988	The Good Mother		
1988	A Night in the Life of Jimmy Reardon	international version	
1988	Da		
1989	My Left Foot	Jim Sheridan	
1989	Slipstream	Steven Lisberger	

=== 1990s ===
Year	Title	Director/Notes
1990	The Field	Jim Sheridan
1990	The Grifters	Stephen Frears
1991	Cape Fear	Martin Scorsese
1991	Rambling Rose	Martha Coolidge
1991	A Rage in Harlem	
1991	Oscar	John Landis
1992	A River Runs Through It	rejected score, replaced by Mark Isham
1992	Innocent Blood	rejected score, replaced by Ira Newborn
1993	Mad Dog and Glory	
1993	The Age of Innocence	Martin Scorsese
1993	Lost in Yonkers	
1993	The Cemetery Club	
1993	The Good Son	Joseph Ruben
1995	Roommates	
1995	The Scarlet Letter	rejected score, replaced by John Barry
1995	Search and Destroy	
1995	Canadian Bacon	
1995	Devil in a Blue Dress	
1995	Frankie Starlight	
1996	Bulletproof	
1996	I Love Trouble	rejected score, replaced by David Newman
1997	Buddy	
1997	The Rainmaker	Francis Ford Coppola
1997	Hoodlum	
1998	Twilight	Robert Benton
1999	Bringing Out the Dead	Martin Scorsese
1999	Wild Wild West	Barry Sonnenfeld
1999	The Deep End of the Ocean	

=== 2000s ===
Year	Title	Director	Notes
2000	Keeping the Faith	Edward Norton	
2002	Far from Heaven	Todd Haynes	
2002	Gangs of New York	Martin Scorsese	rejected score, replaced by Howard Shore

== Television films and series ==
Source: Turner Classic Movies

=== 1950s ===
- General Electric Theater (1958–59; 8 episodes)
- Johnny Staccato (1959–60; 23 episodes)
- Riverboat (1959–60; 18 episodes)

=== 1960s ===
- The Beachcomber (1962; 13 episodes)
- The Dick Powell Show (1962; 1 episode)
- The DuPont Show of the Week (1962; 1 episode)
- The Making of the President, 1960 (1963; Television film)
- Hollywood and the Stars (1963–64; 7 episodes)
- National Geographic Specials (1966; 1 episode)
- ABC Stage 67 (1966–67; 2 episodes)
- The Big Valley (1967–68; 24 episodes)
- Julia (1968–70; 60 episodes)

=== 1970s ===
- Owen Marshall: Counselor at Law (1971–74; 20 episodes)
- Gunsmoke (1972; 1 episode)
- The Rookies (1972–74; 12 episodes)
- Ellery Queen (1975–76; 17 episodes)
- Serpico (1976; Pilot episode, two more episodes, and series' main theme)
- Captains and the Kings (1976; Miniseries – 8 episodes)
- Once An Eagle (1976–77; Miniseries – 7 episodes)
- Seventh Avenue (1977; Miniseries – 2 episodes)
- Little Women (1978; Miniseries – 2 episodes)
- The Chisholms (1979; Miniseries – 4 episodes)

=== 1980s ===
- Guyana Tragedy: The Story of Jim Jones (1980; Television film)
- This Year's Blonde (1980; Television film)
- Ripley's Believe It or Not! (1983; 1 episode)
- Gulag (1985; Television film)

=== 1990s ===
- Murder in Mississippi (1990 Television film) (Rejected Score)
- The Bogie Man (1992; Television film)
- Fallen Angels (1993–95; 10 episodes)
- Rough Riders (1997; Miniseries – 2 episodes)
- Introducing Dorothy Dandridge (1999; Television film)

=== 2000s ===
- Cecil B. De Mille – American Epic (2004; Television film)

== Theatre ==
- Peter Pan (1954) – composer of incidental music
- How Now, Dow Jones (1967) – Composer – Tony co-nomination for Best Musical, Tony co-nomination for Best Composer and Lyricist
- Merlin (1982) – composer and incidental-music composer – Tony co-nomination for Best Composer and Lyricist

Source: Playbill

== Concert works ==
- Woodstock Fair (1948)
- Pennsylvania Overture (1958)
- Concertino for Ondes Martenot (1983)
- Songs of Love and Loathing (1990)
- Concerto for Guitar and Orchestra (1999)
- Fanfare for the Hollywood Bowl (2004)

Source: Elmer Bernstein: Discography

== Hit records ==
- The Man With the Golden Arm soundtrack (1956, no. 2 on Billboard charts)
- Walk on the Wild Side soundtrack (1962, no. 33)
- Walk on the Wild Side single (1962, Brook Benton, no. 43)
- Walk on the Wild Side single (1962, Jimmy Smith, no. 21)
- The Great Escape soundtrack (1963, no. 50)
- Love With the Proper Stranger single (1964, Jack Jones, no. 63)
- Baby, the Rain Must Fall single (1965, Glenn Yarbrough, no. 12)
- True Grit single (1969, Glen Campbell, no. 35)
- Ghostbusters soundtrack (1984, no. 6)

Source: Elmer Bernstein: Discography
