= Guns of the Magnificent Seven =

1969 film by Paul Wendkos

- Theatrical release poster
- Directed by: Paul Wendkos
- Written by: Herman Hoffman
- Produced by: Vincent M. Fennelly
- Starring: George Kennedy; James Whitmore; Reni Santoni; Frank Silvera; Bernie Casey
- Cinematography: Antonio Macasoli
- Edited by: Walter Hannemann
- Music by: Elmer Bernstein
- Production company: The Mirisch Production Company
- Distributed by: United Artists
- Release dates: May 28, 1969 (Philadelphia); July 30, 1969 (New York City); August 1, 1969 (United States)
- Running time: 105 minutes
- Country: United States
- Language: English

Guns of the Magnificent Seven is a 1969 American Western film styled in the genre of a Zapata Western, and the second sequel to the 1960 film The Magnificent Seven, itself based on Akira Kurosawa's Seven Samurai (1954). The film was directed by Paul Wendkos and produced by Vincent M. Fennelly. It stars George Kennedy as Chris Adams, the character Yul Brynner portrayed in the first two films.

The additions to the cast to make up the "new" seven are Monte Markham, Bernie Casey, James Whitmore, Reni Santoni, Joe Don Baker and Scott Thomas. Each have their quirks and baggage. They band together to help free a Mexican revolutionary (Fernando Rey) and help fight the oppression of sadistic Federale Colonel Diego played by Michael Ansara. Elmer Bernstein once again provides the music.

== Plot ==
In late 19th century Mexico, Federales capture Quintero (Fernando Rey), a revolutionary who attempts to rally those opposing the dictatorship of President Díaz. Before going to prison, Quintero gives his lieutenant, Maximiliano O'Leary (Reni Santoni), $600 (equivalent to $21,000 in 2025) with which to continue the cause. Bandit chief Carlos Lobero (Frank Silvera) demands that the money be used for guns and ammunition, but Max instead crosses the border in search of Chris Adams (George Kennedy): a legendary, American gunman whom his cousin had told him about. Max finally finds the laconic Chris, witnessing him free a man from a rigged trial, first by using his wits, then with the famed hair-trigger skill as a gunfighter.

Chris agrees to mount a rescue of Quintero and uses $500 of Max's money to recruit five highly trained combatants: Keno (Monte Markham), a horse thief and hand-to-hand combat expert (whom Chris saved from hanging); Cassie (Bernie Casey), a brawny but intelligent former slave, who can handle dynamite; Slater (Joe Don Baker), a one-armed, sideshow sharp-shootist; a tubercular wrangler called "P.J." (Scott Thomas), and Levi Morgan (James Whitmore), an aging family man who is doubtful of his worth, despite his incredible knife-throwing skills.

En route to Mexico, the motley band of Americans becomes less mercenary when observing the brutal treatment of the peasants. Their journey is marked by encounters with a political prisoner's little boy, Emiliano Zapata (Tony Davis) and a pretty peasant girl, Tina (Wende Wagner), who falls in love with P.J. When Lobero learns that Max did not buy guns with the $600, he refuses to allow his men to take part in Quintero's rescue. Realizing that he needs support, Chris frees a prison gang that includes Zapata's father, then trains them in military tactics.

Despite their superior fighting skills and strategy, Chris' men are outnumbered and their valiant effort to free Quintero appears doomed. At the last moment, 50 of Lobero's bandits, having slain their leader for his lack of patriotism, thunder onto the prison grounds and turn the tide of battle. Of the seven, only Chris, Max and Levi survive. Before riding home, Chris and Levi leave behind the $600 the peasants had collected.

== Cast ==
=== The Seven ===
- George Kennedy as Chris Adams
- James Whitmore as Levi Morgan
- Monte Markham as Keno
- Reni Santoni as Maximiliano "Max" O'Leary
- Bernie Casey as Cassie (Note: Bernie Casey made his screen debut in Guns of the Magnificent Seven and would go on to make 40 films.)
- Scott Thomas as P.J.
- Joe Don Baker as Slater

=== Others ===
- Tony Davis as Emilio Zapata
- Michael Ansara as Colonel Diego
- Frank Silvera as Lobero
- Wende Wagner as Tina
- Sancho Gracia as Miguel
- Luis Rivera as Lieutenant Prensa
- George Rigaud as Gabriel
- Fernando Rey as Angel Quintero
- Peter Lawman as Carlos

== Production ==
Guns of the Magnificent Seven was preceded by Return of the Seven in 1966, and followed by The Magnificent Seven Ride! in 1972. Executive producer Walter Mirisch felt that in the unpredictable market of filmgoers, there was safety in familiar material. Yul Brynner did not want to return to the role of Chris; the role was taken by George Kennedy, then at a height of popularity after winning his Academy Award for Cool Hand Luke (1967).

Mirisch surrounded Kennedy with a strong cast, with Monte Markham giving a thinly-disguised Steve McQueen-like performance, in the same wardrobe McQueen wore in The Magnificent Seven. Elmer Bernstein was on hand to reprise part of original score of The Magnificent Seven and adding new elements. Mirisch also had his contract director Paul Wendkos direct. The producer of the film, Vincent M. Fennelly, had worked with Mirisch at Monogram and had produced the Clint Eastwood Western TV series Rawhide.

Guns of the Magnificent Seven did very well at the international box office. In a bit of unfortunate timing, as reviewer Stuart Galbraith IV remarked, "The picture hit theaters in July 1969 – the very same time as The Wild Bunch; the two films have somewhat similar stories but, needless to say, Sam Peckinpah's landmark film is otherwise light years ahead of this unambitious rehash." (Note: The "laziness" of the production can be seen in one quizzical scene where an extra bumps into George Kennedy and rather than re-shooting the scene, the action is left in.)

Guns of the Magnificent Seven was filmed in Panavision at locales in Spain, as was the previous Return of the Seven. Most "Spaghetti Westerns" were made on low budgets, using inexpensive locales resembling the semiarid landscapes of the American Southwest and Northern Mexico. A popular setting was the Tabernas Desert in the Province of Almería in southeastern Spain, at the studios of Texas Hollywood, Mini Hollywood and Western Leone.

== Reception ==
=== Critical response ===
Guns of the Magnificent Seven was not well received by critics. In his review for The New York Times, Howard Thompson noted the film suffered from poor production values, and a derivative plot, "It's the same old iron-jawed, cowboy seven, with new actors and all the magnificence of a dead burro."

The review in Variety was kinder. "Guns of the Magnificent Seven is a handy follow-up to the 1960 original 'Magnificent Seven' and 'Return of the Seven'. It rises above a routine story line via rugged treatment and action builds to a blazing gunplay climax."

=== Release ===
Guns of the Magnificent Seven opened at the Milgram theatre in Philadelphia on May 28, 1969 and grossed $24,000 in its first week.

=== Home media ===
The film was released on DVD on January 31, 2006, by MGM Home Entertainment.
