= Chris Adams (character) =

Fictional character

- Portrayed by: Yul Brynner; George Kennedy; Lee Van Cleef

In-universe information
- Gender: Male
- Title: Warrant officer
- Occupation: United States Marshals Service
- Nationality: American

Chris Adams is a fictional character in the 1960 Western film The Magnificent Seven and its sequels. Originally played by Yul Brynner, he is the functional equivalent of Kambei Shimada, the character portrayed by Takashi Shimura in the 1954 film Seven Samurai.

== Description ==
Adams, a Cajun, is the laconic leader of a band of seven gunfighters. He always wears black, smokes cigars, and shoots sharp. He is a man of principle, incorruptible and sturdy.

=== Character analysis ===
Adams, and to a lesser extent the others of the Seven, are examples of the "western hero"-archetype who is resolute, "single minded", "independent", "strong", "loyal", and "honorable" as well as having various other positive characteristics. "The key lesson that Adams teaches is the distinction between law and ethics, laid out in 1924 by the British jurist Lord Moulton, who distinguished between the realms of law and of ethics. Law requires obedience to the enforceable, while ethics requires 'obedience to the unenforceable'". Hence, Adams and the other members of the Seven "help the locals focus on the survival skills they will need" and their "leadership is necessary", even though it is essentially transient. They are "desperate for money, but equally in need of self-esteem, of belonging and a sense of worth." Adams is not as cruel as his chief antagonist, the bandit leader Calvera, but like Calvera represents a way of life that is antithetical to humane civilization. Nevertheless, Adams and Calvera are morally equivalent and Calvera is in some ways preferable or at least, seems to be the more powerful and inescapable of the two. As a result, Adams has been called "a black-clad Shane".

== Portrayal ==
Yul Brynner originally played Adams in The Magnificent Seven (1960) and reprised the role in the Return of the Seven (1966). Brynner's character in the 1973 science fiction Western thriller Westworld is visually based on Adams.

George Kennedy played Adams in the Guns of the Magnificent Seven (1969), while Lee Van Cleef portrayed the character in the fourth film, The Magnificent Seven Ride! (1972).

=== Chris Larabee ===
Portrayed by Michael Biehn, Larabee is loosely based on the "Chris Adams" character from the original films. His wife and son were murdered before the start of the series, turning him into a reserved but deadly individual. His quest for vengeance is a recurring theme through several episodes of the series.

=== Sam Chisolm ===
Sam Chisolm, a warrant officer from Wichita, Kansas, and leader of the Seven, is Adams' counterpart in the 2016 remake. He is played by Denzel Washington.

== Appearances ==
- The Magnificent Seven (1960)
- Return of the Seven (1966)
- Guns of the Magnificent Seven (1969)
- The Magnificent Seven Ride! (1972)
