= The Magnificent Seven (2016 film) =

American film by Antoine Fuqua

- Theatrical release poster
- Directed by: Antoine Fuqua
- Screenplay by: Nic Pizzolatto; Richard Wenk
- Based on: The Magnificent Seven by William Roberts (Note: The Magnificent Seven (1960) is an American remake of the Japanese film Seven Samurai (1954) which was written by Akira Kurosawa, Shinobu Hashimoto and Hideo Oguni)
- Produced by: Roger Birnbaum; Todd Black
- Starring: Denzel Washington; Chris Pratt; Ethan Hawke; Vincent D'Onofrio; Byung-hun Lee; Manuel Garcia-Rulfo; Martin Sensmeier; Peter Sarsgaard
- Cinematography: Mauro Fiore
- Edited by: John Refoua
- Music by: James Horner; Simon Franglen
- Production companies: Metro-Goldwyn-Mayer Pictures; Columbia Pictures; Village Roadshow Pictures; LStar Capital; Pin High Productions; Escape Artists; Fuqua Films
- Distributed by: Sony Pictures Releasing
- Release dates: September 8, 2016 (TIFF); September 23, 2016 (United States)
- Running time: 133 minutes
- Country: United States
- Language: English
- Budget: $90–107 million
- Box office: $162.4 million

The Magnificent Seven is a 2016 American Western action film directed by Antoine Fuqua and written by Nic Pizzolatto and Richard Wenk. It is a remake of the 1960 film, which itself was a remake of Akira Kurosawa's film Seven Samurai. The film stars Denzel Washington, Chris Pratt, Ethan Hawke, Vincent D'Onofrio, Lee Byung-hun, Manuel Garcia-Rulfo, Martin Sensmeier, and Peter Sarsgaard. It was the final film of composer James Horner, who died in 2015 after composing part of the score. His friend Simon Franglen completed the music. Principal photography began on May 18, 2015, north of Baton Rouge, Louisiana.

The Magnificent Seven premiered on September 8, 2016, at the 2016 Toronto International Film Festival as the opening film, and was released in the United States on September 23, 2016, by Sony Pictures Releasing. The film received mixed reviews from critics, where the cast, action sequences, and the score were praised, but the story and screenplay received criticism. It was a moderate success, grossing $162 million worldwide on a production budget of $90 million.

== Plot ==
In 1879, robber baron and gold-mining tycoon Bartholomew Bogue, accompanied by an army of Blackstone Agents, seizes control of the frontier town of Rose Creek and forces the residents to work as cheap labor for his mine, while polluting their water supply. Being denounced by the residents, Bogue has their church torched and several of the townsfolk, including farmer Matthew Cullen, brutally murdered in public view. Bogue then gives them a 3 week notice to turn over the deeds to their land at the offer he granted.

Matthew's widow Emma and her friend Teddy leave in search of bounty hunters to help save the town. Their first recruit is Wichita-based bounty-hunter Sam Chisholm, who expresses interest in Bogue's involvement. He in turn recruits six others: gambler and trick-shooter Joshua Faraday; pardon-seeking outlaw Vasquez; former Confederate sharpshooter Goodnight Robicheaux; his friend, assassin Billy Rocks; legendary mountain man Jack Horne; and Comanche warrior Red Harvest.

The Seven enter Rose Creek and eliminate twenty-two Blackstone agents guarding the town, while their lead agent, McCann, flees on horseback. Chisholm apprehends the corrupt sheriff, Mr. Harp, sending him away to challenge Bogue. Chisholm tells the terrified townspeople that they now have seven days before Bogue's army arrives. Although some flee, most are determined to fight.

The Seven liberate the men held at the mine, take the explosives stockpiled there and spend the next week fortifying the town and training the townsfolk in combat. Meanwhile, Bogue kills Harp and orders McCann and his Comanche enforcer Denali, to assemble an army. Robicheaux, haunted by his experiences in the Civil War and fearing his own death if he kills again, leaves the town the night before Bogue's arrival. Emma volunteers to take his place.

At dawn, Bogue's army attacks Rose Creek. A large number are killed by various traps and ambushes. Faraday is wounded by McCann, who is killed by Vasquez; the defensive line collapses, and Robicheaux returns to join the battle, warning the others of an incoming Gatling gun. The gun tears through both the townspeople and Bogue's men alike. Outgunned, the Seven evacuate the survivors to the burnt-out church and mount a last stand.

Horne protects a wounded Teddy from gunfire, but is killed by Denali. Denali then prepares to kill Emma. An enraged Red Harvest kills Denali, calling him "a disgrace". Robicheaux and Billy are killed by a second round of Gatling gunfire while covering Faraday from the church steeple, who charges up the hill and destroys the gun with dynamite at the cost of his own life.

Chisholm confronts and guns down the two remaining mercenaries before disarming Bogue. A wounded Bogue retreats into the church, where Chisholm reveals that his family in Lincoln, Kansas was lynched by ex-Confederate soldiers whom Bogue hired to remove homesteaders. After imploring Bogue to repent, Chisholm begins to garrote him. Bogue tries to draw a hidden revolver, but Emma kills him.

The townspeople do return to Rose Creek and thank Chisholm, Vasquez, and Red Harvest for their help as they ride off. Faraday, Robicheaux, Billy and Horne are buried near the town and honored as heroes. Emma, in voice-over narration, reflects fondly on the noble sacrifice that made them "magnificent".

== Cast ==
=== The Seven ===
- Denzel Washington as Sam Chisholm, a bounty hunter from Kansas
- Chris Pratt as Joshua Faraday, a drifter and trick-shooter
- Ethan Hawke as Goodnight Robicheaux, a Cajun former Confederate sharpshooter
- Vincent D'Onofrio as Jack Horne, a deeply religious mountain man and hunter
- Byung-hun Lee as Billy Rocks, a knife-wielding Chinese man
- Manuel Garcia-Rulfo as Vasquez, a Mexican outlaw and gunslinger
- Martin Sensmeier as Red Harvest, a Comanche warrior

=== Others ===
- Peter Sarsgaard as Bartholomew Bogue
- Haley Bennett as Emma Cullen
- Luke Grimes as Teddy Q.
- Matt Bomer as Matthew Cullen
- Jonathan Joss as Denali
- Cam Gigandet as McCann, Bogue's right-hand-man
- Dane Rhodes as Sheriff Harp
- Sean Bridgers as Fanning
- Billy Slaughter as Josiah
- Mark Ashworth as Rose Creek's preacher
- Matthew Posey as Hank Stoner
- William Lee Scott as Moody
- Clint James as Fenton
- Carrie Lazar as Leni Frankel, another widow
- Jody Mullins as Caleb Frankel, Leni's farmer husband
- David Kallaway as Turner, the town blacksmith
- Chad Randall as Powder Dan, an outlaw executed by Sam Chisholm, who was wanted for murder

== Production ==
=== Development ===
I kept reminding myself of when I was a 12‑year‑old boy, when I was a kid watching it with my grandmother, what was the feeling I had? How much fun was it? How cool were they? For me, I always had my grandmother in my mind when making a film. Would she enjoy this film?

— Director Antoine Fuqua on his approach to the remake.

The film was reported to be in the planning stages in 2012, with Tom Cruise set to star, with Kevin Costner, Morgan Freeman and Matt Damon also up for roles. In December 2013, Cruise reportedly left the project, while John Lee Hancock was brought in to write a new draft of the script. In early 2014, MGM chairman Gary Barber and his cohorts approached Antoine Fuqua to read the script by Richard Wenk and Nic Pizzolatto, while Fuqua was making Southpaw.

Fuqua has loved Western films since discovering the genre at the age of twelve, and said that his grandmother, with whom he would watch films such as Shane (1953) and The Searchers (1956), was a key inspiration during the remake. Fuqua also tried to stay true to the DNA of Seven Samurai, on which the film is based.

Fuqua said he wanted to remake the film because the subject of tyranny and terrorism still prevails, as it did in Seven Samurai. He has said that there is therefore a strong need for people to step up and serve, which is what samurai means – "to serve". Fuqua never imagined he would get a chance to direct a Western, and when MGM called him to helm the picture, he hesitated at first, given the high regard he had for Seven Samurai and its director, Akira Kurosawa.

=== Casting ===
Fuqua met studio executives to see possible actors for the film, and saw that they were all white. He found this to be problematic, as he wanted to make the cast diverse. Fuqua worked to create this diverse cast by incorporating actors of color, such as African-American Denzel Washington, Korean Lee Byung-hun and Mexican Manuel Garcia-Rulfo, and making sure the female lead Emma Cullen (Haley Bennett) did not conform to stereotypes. It is a decision, Fuqua stated, that reflects historical reality more than it does any conscious attempt to update the story: "There were a lot of black cowboys, a lot of Native Americans; Asians working on the railroads. The truth of the West is more modern than the movies have been".

The actors were cast between December 2014 and July 2015. At one point, Jason Momoa was in talks to join the project, but had to leave because he was already cast to play Aquaman. The cast were put through cowboy training before filming commenced, and were sent to boot camp to hone their skills.

Denzel Washington's character, warrant officer and bounty-hunter Sam Chisolm, was renamed from Chris Adams, played by Yul Brynner in the original film. It is Washington's first Western film. Washington did not watch Western films growing up, as it was the end of the Western era in cinema. He and his siblings were not permitted to go to the movies by his father, a Church of God in Christ minister. They grew up watching biblical films instead, like King of Kings and The Ten Commandments, though he did watch portions of the Rawhide and Bonanza shows. Washington did not watch the 1960 film in preparation, but had seen Seven Samurai. This was an arbitrary decision of his, since he thought that watching the 1960 film would not help him: "[Not seeing it] allowed me to do whatever I wanted to do. Instead of trying not to do what someone else did."

As with his previous films, Washington would start off the day by kneeling down and praying, asking for forgiveness for all his wrongdoings. "For me," he said, "this is more than just making movies. It is a platform." Fuqua said that Washington, with whom he had twice collaborated, was his first choice to be cast irrespective of the role. The producers were skeptical whether Washington would take the job since it was a Western film, but Fuqua flew to New York City to negotiate with the actor, who accepted the offer.

Chris Pratt described his character Josh Faraday as "a bit of a fox, a trickster. He's a gambler, a drinker. He loves the ladies. But he's deadly in a fire fight." Like Washington, it is also Pratt's first Western film. Pratt began watching Western films at the age of 31, while filming in London, and credits Gary Cooper for revitalizing his perspective towards the genre. Fuqua, aware of Pratt's penchant towards Westerns, reached out to him, and Pratt called back in a few days singing "Oh Shenandoah", to which Fuqua replied, "He's it. He's Steve McQueen."

Fuqua's approach to Ethan Hawke's character Goodnight Robicheaux, a former Confederate soldier, was to picture him as if Christopher Walken's character Nikanor "Nick" Chevotarevich in The Deer Hunter was an emotionally shattered Civil War veteran. Hawke was the first person to come on board after the project was finalized. He had stumbled upon Fuqua and Washington during the New York City premiere of The Equalizer in 2014 and, upon learning that a remake was in the works, asked Fuqua to cast him. Like Washington, The Magnificent Seven marks the third collaboration between Hawke and Fuqua, after Training Day (2001) and Brooklyn's Finest (2009).

Manuel Garcia-Rulfo described his character Vasquez, a bandit on the run from the law, as someone who loves gunfighting.

Martin Sensmeier auditioned several times to land the role of Red Harvest, a native Comanche warrior. He stayed off social media and studied intently to portray his part. Scotty Augere, who had previously worked on Dances with Wolves, taught Sensmeier how to ride a horse bareback and rode with him two hours a day.

Vincent D'Onofrio was cast as mountain man Jack Horne on the urging of co-stars Chris Pratt and Ethan Hawke. For the role, D'Onofrio developed a raw, high-pitched voice to give the impression of a man who has lived in the wilderness for years without speaking to people. When he asked to test the voice for Fuqua, the director refused to listen, instructing the actor to surprise him with it in his first scene, which resulted in a delighted Fuqua laughing so hard that he almost ruined the take.

=== Filming ===
Principal photography on the film lasted 92 days, from May 18 to August 18, 2015, in the north of Baton Rouge, Louisiana. Other locations include St. Francisville; Zachary, Louisiana; Jackson, Louisiana: Ridgway, Colorado; and New Mexico. Filming in St. Francisville was completed between May 18 and 29, 2015.

The climactic battle between the Seven and a small army led by Bogue took three weeks to film. The weather was inclement. Sometimes the cast and crew waited in the on-set saloon for storms to pass, and, at times when the storm would worsen, the trailer rocked and they would have to leave the set.

Since his grandmother was the prime influence on the film, every day after filming, Fuqua asked himself if she would have had fun watching it.

=== Music ===
James Horner was tapped to write the film's score, but he died in June 2015, before filming could commence. In July 2015, Fuqua learned that Horner had already begun working on the music before his death, and intended to present it as a surprise. Horner's friend and score producer Simon Franglen co-composed the score afterward. It features an incorporation of Elmer Bernstein's theme from the 1960 film. It was released on September 16, 2016, by Sony Classical, and is the third Horner score released posthumously.

== Release ==
The Magnificent Seven had its world premiere at the 2016 Toronto International Film Festival as the opening film on September 8, and served as the closing-night film at the Venice Film Festival on September 9, 2016. The film was originally set to be released on January 13, 2017. In February 2016, Sony Pictures Entertainment moved the release date to September 23, 2016.

=== Marketing ===
Sony kicked off its campaign on April 20, 2016, launching the first trailer, and the cast took to their social media platforms to reveal character-by-character. Television advertisement began during the summer, when the trailers were paired with the NBA finals and BET Awards, as well as the 2016 Summer Olympics. Sony rounded out the campaign with a presence in live sporting events, such as National Football League, NCAA Football and local Major League Baseball games, as well as highly anticipated fall premieres and original programming, like Empire, The Voice, American Horror Story, Fear the Walking Dead and Designated Survivor.

== Reception ==
=== Box office ===
The Magnificent Seven grossed $93.4 million in the United States and Canada, and $68.9 million in other countries, for a worldwide total of $162.4 million, against a net production budget of $90 million. The film had a global 2D IMAX opening of $4.3 million from 606 theaters.

==== North America ====
In the United States and Canada, The Magnificent Seven was released alongside Storks, and was projected to open to around $30 million, with some estimates going as high as $50 million, which would have made it one of the biggest September debuts of all time. The film opened in 3,674 theaters, and had the benefit of playing in all IMAX theaters for one week, and in a number of premium large formats and D-Box screens. It made $1.75 million from Thursday previews and $12.7 million on its first day.

The film grossed $34.7 million in its opening weekend, of which $2.9 million came from 372 IMAX theaters, and topped the box office. It scored the third biggest Western opening, not accounting for inflation, behind Rango ($38.1 million) and Cowboys & Aliens ($36.4 million). It is director Fuqua's second biggest opening and Washington's fourth biggest.

According to the Los Angeles Times, the film was released in theaters at a time when the Western genre had been struggling to attract wide audiences and accrue lucrative revenues, as it has shown considerable downfall in interest among patrons since the 1970s. The genre has had several recent box office flops, such as Cowboys & Aliens (2011) and The Lone Ranger (2013), but has also found success in films like True Grit (2010) and Django Unchained (2012). Its strong debut in North America was partly attributed to the presence of Denzel Washington and Chris Pratt, who industry analysts say are two of only a handful of movie stars today who consistently draw large audiences to theaters, and also to Fuqua's direction.

Deadline Hollywood pointed out that the production budget also plays an important role in determining a film's success. By comparison to other recent Westerns, The Magnificent Seven cost $90 million to make, before promotion and marketing costs are included. The site pointed out that "the trick is keeping their budgets reasonable," unlike The Lone Ranger, which cost $215 million to make, and Cowboys & Aliens, which cost $163 million. The film became a financial recoverer for Metro-Goldwyn-Mayer, after the studio lost a great deal of money with Ben-Hur the previous month, and was the studio's second hit of the year, following the sleeper Me Before You, released in June.

==== Outside North America ====
The film was projected to gross around $100 million, with foreign box office prognosticators expecting a total similar to The Hateful Eight's $101.6 million. It was released in South Korea, its first international market, on September 14, 2016, and delivered an opening of $5.1 million, finishing in third place at the box office, behind local film The Age of Shadows and Hollywood tentpole Ben-Hur. The following weekend, it opened in the United Kingdom, Ireland, Germany, Spain and Russia, and grossed $19.2 million from 63 markets, including Korea. IMAX made up $1.4 million from 234 theaters.

It opened in first place in Russia ($1.8 million), Spain ($1.1 million) and Malaysia ($560,000), and second in the United Kingdom and Ireland ($2.6 million), Germany ($1.4 million) and Brazil ($1.1 million), and had similar openings in Australia ($2.8 million) and France ($1.9 million). China is not yet determined.

=== Critical response ===
The Magnificent Seven received mixed reviews, with critics praising the cast, action sequences, and score, but stating that the film did not offer much originality or innovation. On Rotten Tomatoes, the film has an approval rating of 64%, based on 314 reviews, with an average rating of 6.0/10. The website's critical consensus reads: "The Magnificent Seven never really lives up to the superlative in its title – or the classics from which it draws inspiration – but remains a moderately diverting action thriller on its own merits." On Metacritic, which assigns a normalized rating to reviews, the film has a score of 54 out of 100, based on 50 critics, indicating "mixed or average reviews". Audiences polled by CinemaScore gave the film an average of "A−" on an A+ to F scale.

IGN critic Terri Schwartz gave the film a 6.7/10, and summarized her review with: "The Magnificent Seven ends up being a bit too predictable to reach its full potential, but the fun the cast clearly had making it allows the movie to be an enjoyable ride while it lasts. Fuqua does his best to update the Western for the modern audience, but doesn't capture what made those films great in the process. The action is big and sleek, the characters are charismatic and the film looks beautiful, but this won't be a movie that stays with you long after you leave the theater".

Chicago Sun-Times' Richard Roeper praised the film, giving it a score of three stars out of four, and writing: "Overall, this is a rousing, albeit sometimes cheesy, action-packed Western bolstered by Denzel Washington's baddest-of-the-baddasses lead performance, mostly fine supporting work, and yep, some of the most impressively choreographed extended shootout sequences in recent memory."

James Berardinelli of Reelviews gave the film a score of two stars out of four, writing: "The original The Magnificent Seven found a perfect balance between moments of grand triumph and the understated, solemn denouement. This The Magnificent Seven has the dour ending without the high points preceding it. With two better versions of this story readily available, why bother with this mediocre re-telling? 'Currently recognizable actors' hardly seems like a good justification."

MTV's Amy Nicholson decried the film, writing: "Fuqua's made two clean piles separating good and evil, and in doing so, he's thrown away the film's point. Now we can trade our conscience for a bucket of popcorn. Today's The Magnificent Seven is just another superhero flick that spends half its running time assembling a band of bulletproof daredevils. Which makes sense — the original inspired The Avengers, which published its first comic three years after it was a hit."

Peter Travers of Rolling Stone gave the film three out of four stars, saying: "The new Seven isn't aiming for cinema immortality. It's two hours of hardcore, shoot-em-up pow and it's entertaining as hell."

=== Accolades ===
Award	Date of ceremony	Category	Recipient(s)	Result	Ref.
Black Reel Awards	February 16, 2017	Outstanding Actor	Denzel Washington	Nominated	
Black Reel Awards	February 16, 2017	Outstanding Director	Antoine Fuqua	Nominated	
Jupiter Awards	March 29, 2017	Best International Film	The Magnificent Seven	Nominated	
Jupiter Awards	March 29, 2017	Best International Actor	Denzel Washington	Won	
Saturn Awards	June 28, 2017	Best Action or Adventure Film	The Magnificent Seven	Nominated	
Teen Choice Awards	July 31, 2016	Choice Movie Actor: AnTEENcipated	Chris Pratt	Nominated	

== Future ==
In April 2023, after previously acquiring MGM, Amazon announced plans to expand the franchise with a television series adaptation in development through the company's Amazon Studios.

== See also ==
- West Virginia coal wars, especially the Battle of Blair Mountain between miners and a hired guns army, where a Gatling gun was used.
