= Jun Tatara =

Japanese actor (1917–2006)

- 多々良純
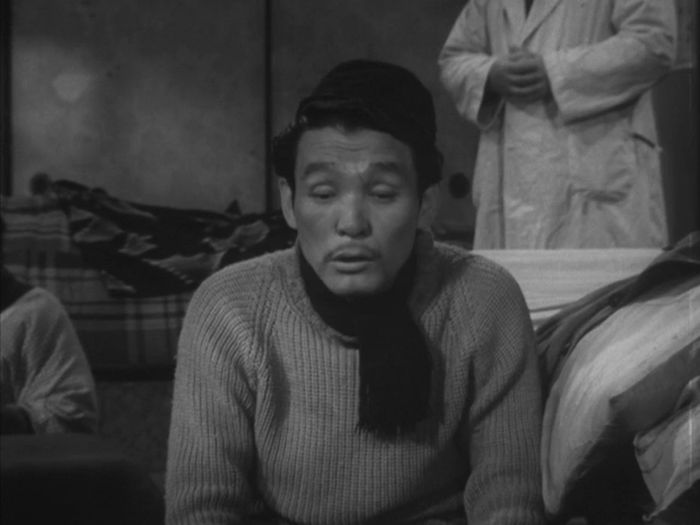
- Jun Tatara in Pas de consultations aujourd'hui (1952)
- Born: Shigeji Tatarai; 4 August 1917; Ishinomaki, Empire of Japan
- Died: 30 September 2006 (aged 89); Tokyo, Japan
- Citizenship: Japanese
- Occupation: Actor
- Years active: 1952–2003
- Notable work: The Seven Samurai (1954)

Jun Tatara (多々良純, Tatara Jun), whose real name was Shigeji Tatarai (田足井 重二, Tatarai Shigeji; 4 August 1917 in Ishinomaki, Miyagi Prefecture – 30 September 2006 in Tokyo) was a Japanese actor.

== Biography ==
Jun Tatara appeared in more than 115 films between 1952 and 2003, including a notable participation in the 1954 Japanese classic Seven Samurai.
