= Yukiko Shimazaki =

Japanese actress and singer (1931-2014)

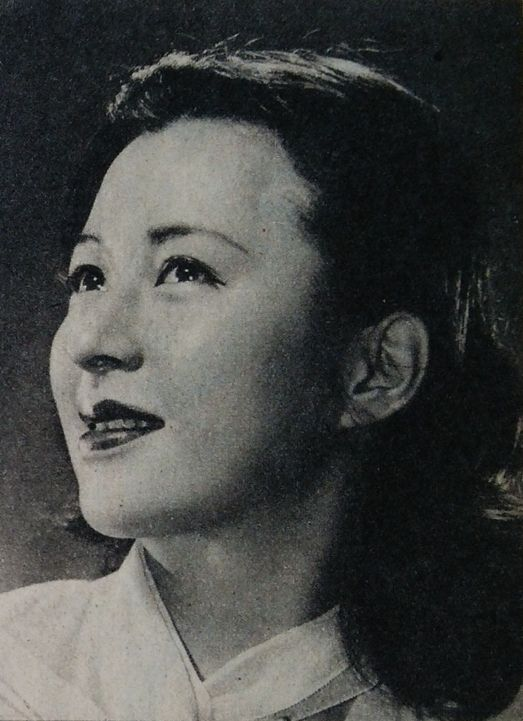
- Yukiko Shimazaki in 1952
- Born: February 25, 1931; Tokyo, Japan
- Died: 2014 (aged 82–83)
- Occupation: Actress
- Years active: 1950-1964
- Spouse: Tatsumi Kumashiro (m. 1955; div. 1967)

Yukiko Shimazaki (島崎 雪子, Shimazaki Yukiko; February 25, 1931 – 2014) was a Japanese actress and singer. She appeared in more than twenty films from 1950 to 1964. She was married to film director Tatsumi Kumashiro from 1955 to 1967. She died in 2014.

== Filmography ==
Film
Year	Title	Role	Notes
1950	Yoru no hibotan	Taiko	
1951	Wakai musumetachi	Tomoko	
1951	Aoi shinju	Noe	
1951	Repast	Satoko Okamoto	
1952	Rakki-san		
1952	Kin no tamago: Golden girl	Miko Mishima	
1952	Wakai hito		
1953	Mogura yokochô	Yoshie Ogata	
1953	Ashita wa dotchi da	Akiko Minegishi / Woman on China dress	
1954	Hana to ryû - Dai-ichi-bu: Dôkai-wan no rantô	Okyô	
1954	Hana to ryû - Dai-ni-bu: Aijô ruten	Oyô	
1954	Seven Samurai	Wife	
1954	Kakute yume ari	Natsuko	
1955	Shiinomi gakuen	Tanaka-sensei	
1955	Sara no hana no toge	Nami	
1955	Akagi no chi matsuri		
1960	Gambare! Bangaku		
1960	'Minagoroshi no uta' yori kenjû-yo saraba!	Mamiko Kinugawa	
1961	Blueprint of Murder	Singer at Paloson	
1961	Kaoyaku akatsukini shisu		
1964	Suna no ue no shokubutsu-gun	Igi's wife	(final film role)
