= Return of the Seven =

1966 film by Burt Kennedy

- Theatrical release poster
- Directed by: Burt Kennedy
- Written by: Larry Cohen
- Produced by: Ted Richmond
- Starring: Yul Brynner; Robert Fuller; Julián Mateos; Warren Oates; Virgílio Teixeira; Claude Akins; Elisa Montés; Jordan Christopher
- Cinematography: Paul C. Vogel
- Edited by: Bert Bates
- Music by: Elmer Bernstein
- Production companies: Mirisch Productions; C.B. Films
- Distributed by: United Artists
- Release date: 19 October 1966
- Running time: 95 minutes
- Countries: United States; Spain
- Languages: English; Spanish
- Box office: $6.4 million (rentals)

Return of the Seven, later marketed as Return of the Magnificent Seven, is a 1966 Western film, and the first sequel to The Magnificent Seven (1960). Yul Brynner, who reprises his role as Chris Adams, is the sole returning cast member from the original film, while Robert Fuller, Julián Mateos and Elisa Montés replace Steve McQueen, Horst Buchholz and Rosenda Monteros as Vin Tanner, Chico and Petra respectively.

The film was written by Larry Cohen and directed by Burt Kennedy, and features Warren Oates, Claude Akins, Jordan Christopher and Virgílio Teixeira. Emilio Fernández is the villain. Fernando Rey portrays a priest. Rey was in the next film, Guns of the Magnificent Seven, as a different character.

Kennedy called the film "all right; we didn’t have much of a budget or any big-name actors except Yul Brynner, but it was all right."

== Plot ==
Fifty gunmen force all of the men in a small Mexican village to ride off with them into the desert. Among the captured farmers is Chico, who years before was one of seven hired gunslingers responsible for ridding the village of a tyrannical bandit, Calvera. Chico's wife, Petra, seeks out the only other members of the band to survive: Chris and Vin. She begs them to save the village once more. To replace the deceased members of the group, Chris buys the release of Frank (a taciturn gunman) and Luis (a famous bandit), held in the local jail, and recruits Colbee, a ladies' man and deadly gunman, and Manuel, a young cockfighter.

The six men discover that the missing villagers are being used as slave labor to rebuild a desert village and church as a memorial to the dead sons of wealthy rancher Lorca. In a surprise attack, the six gunmen force Lorca's men to leave, and prepare for a counterattack with Chico. The cowed farmers offer no assistance, but the seven defenders successfully repulse Lorca's initial attack. Lorca, the rancher, then gathers all of the men on his land to rout the seven men.

The situation seems bleak until Manuel discovers a supply of dynamite which the seven use in a counteroffensive. They are eventually overrun, but Chris emerges victorious from a shootout with Lorca. The rancher's gang flee, leaving Frank, Luis, and Manuel dead in the fighting. Chico plans to resettle the village on Lorca's fertile land, and Colbee remains to help teach the villagers how to defend themselves against future attacks; he also plans to pursue the available women. Chris and Vin once more ride off together.

== Cast ==
=== The Seven ===
- Yul Brynner as Chris Adams
- Robert Fuller as Vin Tanner
- Julián Mateos as Chico
- Warren Oates as Colbee
- Claude Akins as Frank Riker
- Virgílio Teixeira as Luis Emilio Delgado
- Jordan Christopher as Manuel De Norte

=== Others ===
- Elisa Montés as Petra, Chico's wife
- Fernando Rey as Priest
- Emilio Fernández as Francisco Lorca
- Rodolfo Acosta as Lopez (credited as Rudy Acosta)
- Gracita Sacromonte as Flamenco Dancer
- Carlos Casaravilla as First Peon
- Ricardo Palacios as Jailer
- Felisa Jiminez as Female Prisoner
- Pedro Bermudez as Boy
- Francisco Antón as Matador
- Moises Menendez as Second Peon
- Hector Quiroga as Third Peon
- Jose Talavera as Fourth Peon

== Production ==
The film was shot in Spain.

== Reception ==
Return of the Seven was critically panned. Art Murphy in industry paper Variety called it "unsatisfactory... plodding, cliche-ridden". On Rotten Tomatoes, the film holds a critical approval of 13%, based on 8 reviews, with an average rating of 3.6/10. Composer Elmer Bernstein received an Academy Award nomination for his score, a re-recorded version of his score for The Magnificent Seven (1960).

The film earned an estimated $1.6 million in theatrical rentals during its initial release in the United States and Canada but did better overseas, earning at least $3.5 million, for a worldwide total of $5.1 million.

The film was re-released in the United States and Canada in 1969 and earned additional rentals of $1.3 million, taking its worldwide total to at least $6.4 million.

== See also ==
- List of American films of 1966
