= Kohei Ezaki =

Kohei Ezaki (江崎 孝坪, Ezaki Kōhei; real given name 孝平, 15 June 1904 – 27 June 1963) was a Japanese Nihonga painter from Takatō, Nagano. He was a pupil of Seison Maeda.

Ezaki was also engaged in films as an art director and costume designer. He was nominated for the Academy Award for Best Costume Design for his work in Akira Kurosawa's film Seven Samurai (1954).
