= The Magnificent Seven Ride! =

1972 film by George McCowan

- Theatrical release poster
- Directed by: George McCowan
- Written by: Arthur Rowe
- Produced by: William Calihan
- Starring: Lee Van Cleef; Stefanie Powers; Michael Callan; Pedro Armendáriz Jr.
- Cinematography: Fred Koenekamp
- Edited by: Walter Thompson
- Music by: Elmer Bernstein
- Production company: The Mirisch Production Company
- Distributed by: United Artists
- Release date: August 1, 1972
- Running time: 100 minutes
- Country: United States
- Language: English
- Budget: $3 million

The Magnificent Seven Ride! (also known as The Magnificent Seven 4) is a 1972 American Western film and the third and last sequel to the 1960 film The Magnificent Seven. It stars Lee Van Cleef as Chris Adams, succeeding Yul Brynner and George Kennedy in the role. It was directed by George McCowan.

== Plot ==
In southern Arizona Territory, hired gun-turned-marshal Chris Adams rescues his old friend, former bounty hunter Jim MacKay, from an ambush. Jim asks Chris to help him defend the Mexican border town of Magdalena from De Toro and his bandits, but Chris is reluctant.

Chris refuses his new wife Arrila's request to release teenager Shelly Donavan, jailed for robbery. Chris meets with newspaper writer Noah Forbes for a story on Chris' eventful career.

The next morning, loading prisoners onto the Tucson prison wagon, Chris decides to free Donavan. Chris meets Noah to discuss his exploits, as Donavan celebrates his release with Hank and Bob Allen. Donavan leads the brothers in a bank robbery just as Arrila meets Chris and Noah outside. Wounding Chris, Donavan abducts Arrila and escapes with the Allens. Revived two days later, Chris sets off in search of Arrila, accompanied by Noah.

In the desert, Noah and Chris find Arrila dead. Chris tracks down the Allens and demands to know Donavan's whereabouts. Confident that Chris will take them back to town for trial and not shoot them on the spot, Hank refuses to talk. Chris shoots him. Bob then decides to talk and reveals that Donavan has fled to Mexico, and admits Arrila was raped and tortured before her murder. Bob pleads for his life, insisting he did not join in the assault, but Chris shoots him (for not preventing it, either) as Noah looks on in shock.

Chris rides to the Mexican border and finds Jim with armed farmers from Magdalena, hoping to ambush De Toro. Jim reveals that Donavan rode by the previous day, and Chris again refuses to join, telling Jim he is badly outnumbered and will be slaughtered. Chris and Noah track Donavan through the desert, only to find themselves circling back toward Jim's location. Hearing distant gunfire, they find the farmers dead with no sign of Jim. Chris assumes the women of Magdalena have been left unprotected and Jim will have returned there, and rides into Mexico with the uncertain Noah.

At the mission in Magdalena, Chris kills three bandits and find the townswomen, who have been beaten and raped. Laurie Gunn explains that the women were defenseless against De Toro and his more than forty men who arrived the previous day. Although Laurie and the women plead with Chris to help them escape before De Toro's return, he points out there are no horses and a desert trek would kill them. Realizing that the American Cavalry will not cross the border, Chris and Noah ride to Tucson, promising to return. Not far from Magdalena, the pair come upon the bodies of Jim and Donavan (with MacKay having avenged Shelly's betrayal of the ambush to DeToro's gang).

In Tucson, Chris meets with the governor then travels to the prison, asking the warden to pardon the last five prisoners he arrested: Pepe Carrall, Walt Drummond, Scott Elliott, Mark Skinner, and former Confederate captain Andy Hayes. Chris tells the criminals he will sign their pardons if they join his posse, and they grudgingly agree. Loaded with supplies, the group departs for De Toro's hacienda. The men overcome the guards and loot the home, and Chris takes De Toro's woman captive. Riding to Magdalena, Chris warns the men not to escape.

Chris designs an elaborate trap for the bandits. The women and construction worker Elliott help prepare several ditches, barbed wire fences, and hidden barriers. After training the women in reloading the weapons, the town awaits De Toro's arrival. The bandits attack, but the town's initial assault with long-range guns sends the outlaws into disarray. The defenders retreat to the second line of defense; protected by Elliott's clever fences, they dynamite many of the bandits. Walt, Hayes and Elliott are killed and Noah wounded as the group retreats behind another rigged barricade.

At the mission where De Toro's woman and the town children are hiding, Chris tells Laurie his last resort: they will lure the bandits inside and blow up the church. Pepe is killed in De Toro's renewed assault. Hearing the bandits approach, Laurie prepares to dynamite the mission and frees De Toro's woman, who rushes outside into the gunfight and is shot by De Toro. Momentarily stunned, De Toro is killed by Chris, and the remaining bandits flee.

Chris, Noah, and Skinner decide to start new lives in Magdalena.

== Cast ==
=== The Seven ===
- Lee Van Cleef as U.S. Marshal Chris Adams
- Michael Callan as Noah Forbes, Newspaper Reporter
- Luke Askew as Mark Skinner, Convict
- James B. Sikking as Captain Andy Hayes, Convict
- Pedro Armendáriz Jr. as Pepe Carrall, Convict
- William Lucking as Walt Drummond, Convict
- Ed Lauter as Scott Elliott, Convict

=== Others ===
- Stefanie Powers as Laurie Gunn
- Mariette Hartley as Arrila Adams
- Ralph Waite as Jim MacKay
- Melissa Murphy as Madge Buchanan
- Allyn Ann McLerie as Mrs. Donavan
- Gary Busey as Hank Allen
- Robert Jaffe as Bob Allen
- Darrell Larson as Shelly Donavan
- Elizabeth Thompson as Skinner's Woman
- Carolyn Conwell as Martha
- Ron Stein as Juan De Toro
- Rita Rogers as De Toro's Woman
- Jason Wingreen as The Warden of Tucson Territorial Prison (uncredited)

== Production ==
This is the only film in the series filmed entirely in the United States. Footage in the film was shot within Vasquez Rocks Natural Area Park and Antelope Valley Indian Museum State Historic Park.

== Release ==
The film lost $21,000, though the loss was more than cancelled out by the $1.05 million earned from network television syndication.

== See also ==
- List of American films of 1972
