= Seven Samurai =

1954 Japanese film by Akira Kurosawa

- Theatrical release poster

Japanese name
- Kanji: 七人の侍
Transcriptions
- Revised Hepburn: Shichinin no Samurai
- Directed by: Akira Kurosawa
- Written by: Akira Kurosawa; Shinobu Hashimoto; Hideo Oguni
- Produced by: Sōjirō Motoki
- Starring: Toshiro Mifune; Takashi Shimura; Keiko Tsushima; Isao Kimura; Daisuke Katō; Seiji Miyaguchi; Yoshio Inaba; Minoru Chiaki; Kamatari Fujiwara; Kuninori Kōdō; Yoshio Tsuchiya; Eijiro Tono; Jun Tatara; Atsushi Watanabe; Yoshio Kosugi; Bokuzen Hidari; Yukiko Shimazaki
- Cinematography: Asakazu Nakai
- Edited by: Koichi Iwashita
- Music by: Fumio Hayasaka
- Production company: Toho
- Distributed by: Toho
- Release date: April 26, 1954
- Running time: 207 minutes (with intermission)
- Country: Japan
- Language: Japanese
- Budget: ¥210 million
- Box office: Japan: ¥290 million; Japan rentals: ¥268.2 million; USA: $145,800

Seven Samurai (Japanese: 七人の侍, Hepburn: Shichinin no Samurai) is a 1954 Japanese epic jidaigeki film directed by Akira Kurosawa from a screenplay co-written with Shinobu Hashimoto and Hideo Oguni. Starring Toshirō Mifune, Takashi Shimura, Keiko Tsushima and Yukiko Shimazaki, it tells the story of a village of peasants who hire seven samurai to help defend their village from bandits who will return after the harvest to steal their crops. Influential in world cinema, Seven Samurai is considered to be one of the greatest films ever made.

Kurosawa and Hashimoto researched the Edo period for stories to adapt and came across an account of samurai defending peasants from bandits. Together with Oguni, the screenwriters spent over six weeks writing the script and creating detailed plans for each of the film's characters. Produced by Toho, the film spent three months in pre-production casting and location scouting. Filming began on May 27, 1953 and took place on set at Toho Studios, and on location in Shizuoka and Kanagawa Prefectures. Mid-way through production, the film ran out of money. Toho eventually funded Samurai to a total of ¥210 million, (Note: Equivalent to ¥1.49 billion in 2024) making it the most expensive Japanese film made at the time. For the film's final battle, Kurosawa innovated the use of a multi-camera setup and telephoto lenses to adjust audience perception. Filming wrapped in 1954 after 148 working days.

Seven Samurai was released in Japan on April 26, 1954, with a runtime of 207 minutes. The film was recut before entering the Venice Film Festival. At Venice, Kurosawa won the Silver Lion for direction, and the film was distributed in the United States by Columbia Pictures in November 1956, where it was recut again. The film grossed ¥290 million in ticket sales in Japan (Note: Equivalent to ¥1.95 billion in 2024) making it the highest-grossing film of that year, though due to its large production cost, it was not highly profitable. In the United States, the film grossed $145,800 in 1956 and 1957. (Note: Variety magazine reported $145,800 in ticket sales from multiple theaters across the country in 1957. Equivalent to $1,671,345 in 2025.) The film received a mixed critical response in Japan, but a generally positive response in the US. Reviewers praised the story and acting but criticized the film's length and attitude towards the peasants. American reviews compared the film to Western movies. Samurai was nominated for two Academy Awards and three BAFTAs, but won none.

In the decades since its release, scholars and reviewers have praised the film as a masterpiece. Seven Samurai has been influential among Western filmmakers, with its story and approach to action remade and reiterated numerous times, most notably in the 1960 film The Magnificent Seven. Seven Samurai also influenced other media, including anime and video games. Scholarly analysis of the film has looked at it through a humanistic and formalistic lens. Discussions focus on the morality and heroism of the samurai, showing their relationship to class and the environment. In addition to allegorical readings, scholars have also looked at the film's cinematography, use of music, and Seven Samurai's place within the jidaigeki genre.

== Plot ==
In 1586, a bandit gang discusses raiding a mountain village, but their chief decides to wait until after the harvest for a better haul. Overhearing this, the peasants consult the village elder Gisaku, who advises them to hire samurai willing to fight only in exchange for food. Traveling to a nearby town, the villagers find Kambei, an aging but experienced rōnin, whom they see rescue a boy from a thief. A young samurai named Katsushirō asks to become Kambei's disciple. The villagers ask for Kambei's help, and he agrees after recognizing their suffering. He then recruits Gorobei as his second-in-command, along with Kambei's old comrade-in-arms Shichirōji, Heihachi—a samurai without much skill but an amiable temperament—and Kyūzō, a master swordsman. Kikuchiyo, a wild, self-proclaimed samurai, is accepted too after attempts to drive him away fail.

Following an initially cold response from the villagers, the samurai and peasants start to trust each other; the samurai survey the village's surroundings and begin training the peasants. In a nearby mountain meadow, Katsushirō meets Shino, who was disguised as a boy by her father Manzō. Katsushirō chastises her for not joining the men for training before realizing she is a woman. Later, the samurai are angered when Kikuchiyo brings them armor and weapons, which the villagers acquired by killing other samurai injured or fleeing from battle. Kikuchiyo retorts that samurai are responsible for much of the suffering peasants endure, revealing that he was born a peasant himself. The samurai's anger turns to shame. Later, Heihachi makes a flag that represents both the seven samurai and the village. Katsushirō secretly shares his rice with Shino and the two form a relationship, though they recognize that they cannot be together due to their difference in social class.

As the barley ripens, Kambei organizes the peasants into squads. He tells the villagers that those who live in outlying houses must evacuate. When they dissent, he chastises them for thinking only of themselves and not the village as a whole. Three bandit scouts are spotted around the village; two are killed, while the last reveals their camp's location before the villagers execute him. The samurai burn down the camp in a pre-emptive strike. Rikichi, a troubled villager aiding the samurai, breaks down when he sees his wife, who was taken by the bandits during a previous raid. Upon seeing Rikichi, she runs back into the burning barracks to her death. Heihachi is killed by a gunshot while trying to stop Rikichi from pursuing her. At Heihachi's funeral, Kikuchiyo raises the banner Heihachi had made over the village.

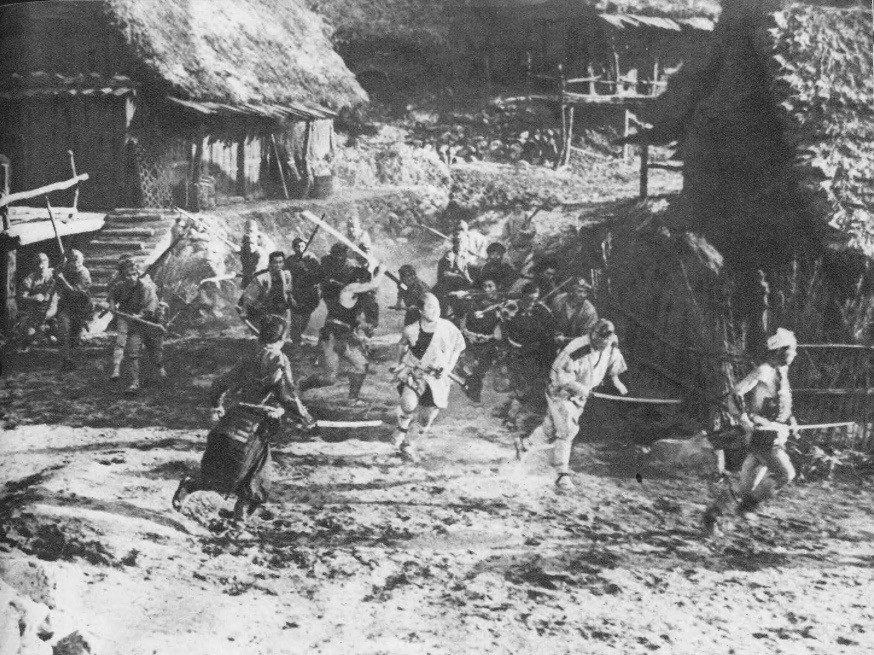
Samurai and villagers attack bandits.

While the village is in mourning, the bandits arrive and burn the village's outlying houses, including Gisaku's mill. Gisaku's family tries to save him when he refuses to abandon it, but all perish except a baby rescued by Kikuchiyo. The village is besieged; many are killed while the defenders thwart the attacks. The bandits possess three matchlock muskets. Kyūzō captures one; an envious Kikuchiyo abandons his squad to bring back another. However, Kikuchiyo's absence allows a handful of bandits to infiltrate his post and kill several peasants. Following gunfire, Gorobei is found dead. That night, Kambei predicts that the bandits will make one final assault.

Meanwhile, Manzō sees Katsushirō and Shino emerging together from a hut. He beats her when he finds out that his daughter's virginity has been taken. Kambei and the villagers intervene and attempt to persuade him that the couple should be forgiven. The next morning, during heavy rainfall, the defenders allow the remaining bandits to enter the village and ambush them. As the battle nears its end, the bandit chief kills Kyūzō with his musket. An enraged Kikuchiyo charges in and is shot as well, but kills the chief before dying. The remaining bandits are slain. Afterward, Kambei, Katsushirō and Shichirōji stand in front of the funeral mounds of their comrades, watching the villagers sing while planting their crops. Katsushirō and Shino encounter each other, but Shino walks past him to join the others while Katsushirō watches her. Kambei declares to Shichirōji that it is a Pyrrhic victory for the samurai and that the real victors are the peasants.

== Cast ==
=== The seven samurai ===
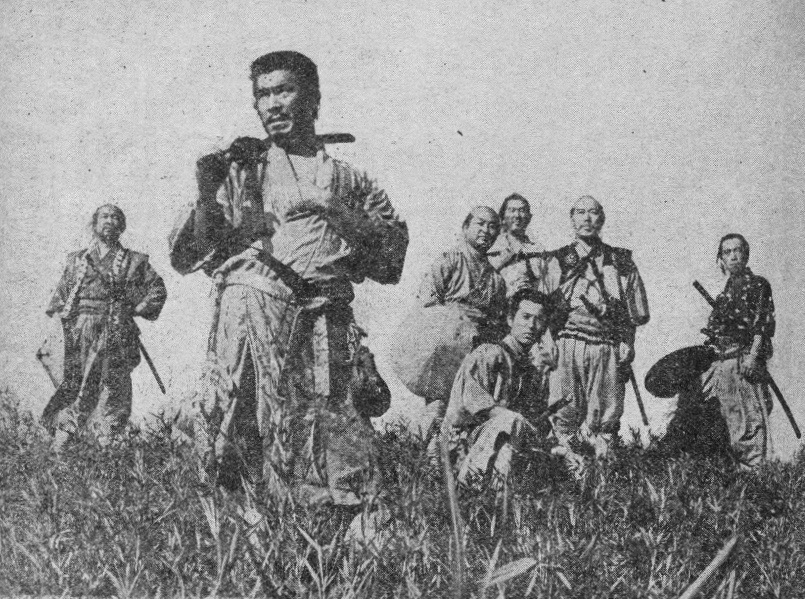
(L-R) Yoshio Inaba, Toshirō Mifune, Daisuke Katō, Minoru Chiaki (back), Isao Kimura (front), Takashi Shimura, Seiji Miyaguchi

- Toshirō Mifune as Kikuchiyo (菊千代), a humorous and temperamental man who lies about being a samurai but joins the others in defense of the village
- Takashi Shimura as Kambei Shimada (島田勘兵衛, Shimada Kanbei), a war-weary rōnin and the leader of the seven
- Isao Kimura as Katsushirō Okamoto (岡本勝四郎, Okamoto Katsushirō), the youngest samurai, whom Kambei takes as a disciple
- Daisuke Katō as Shichirōji (七郎次), Kambei's old friend and former lieutenant
- Seiji Miyaguchi as Kyūzō (久蔵), a serious and skilled swordsman
- Yoshio Inaba as Gorōbei Katayama (片山五郎兵衛, Katayama Gorōbei), Kambei's second-in-command
- Minoru Chiaki as Heihachi Hayashida (林田平八, Hayashida Heihachi), an amiable though less-skilled fighter

=== Villagers ===
- Yoshio Tsuchiya as Rikichi (利吉), a proactive but rash villager
- Bokuzen Hidari as Yohei (与平), a timid villager
- Yukiko Shimazaki as Rikichi's wife
- Kamatari Fujiwara as Manzō (万造), a villager who disguises his daughter as a boy to try to protect her from the samurai
- Keiko Tsushima as Shino (志乃), Manzō's daughter
- Kuninori Kōdō as Gisaku (儀作), the village elder
- Yoshio Kosugi as Mosuke, one of the villagers sent to town to hire the samurai

=== Others ===
- Shinpei Takagi as the bandit chief
- Shin Otomo as the bandit second-in-command (with an eye patch)
- Haruo Nakajima as a bandit scout killed by Kyūzō
- Eijirō Tōno as a thief
- Atsushi Watanabe as a bun seller
- Shuno Takahara as the bandit with a gun
- Jun Tatara as a laborer
- Sachio Sakai as a laborer
- Takeshi Seki as a laborer
- Sōjin Kamiyama as the blind minstrel priest
- Tatsuya Nakadai (uncredited) as a samurai wandering through town

== Production ==
=== Development and pre-production ===
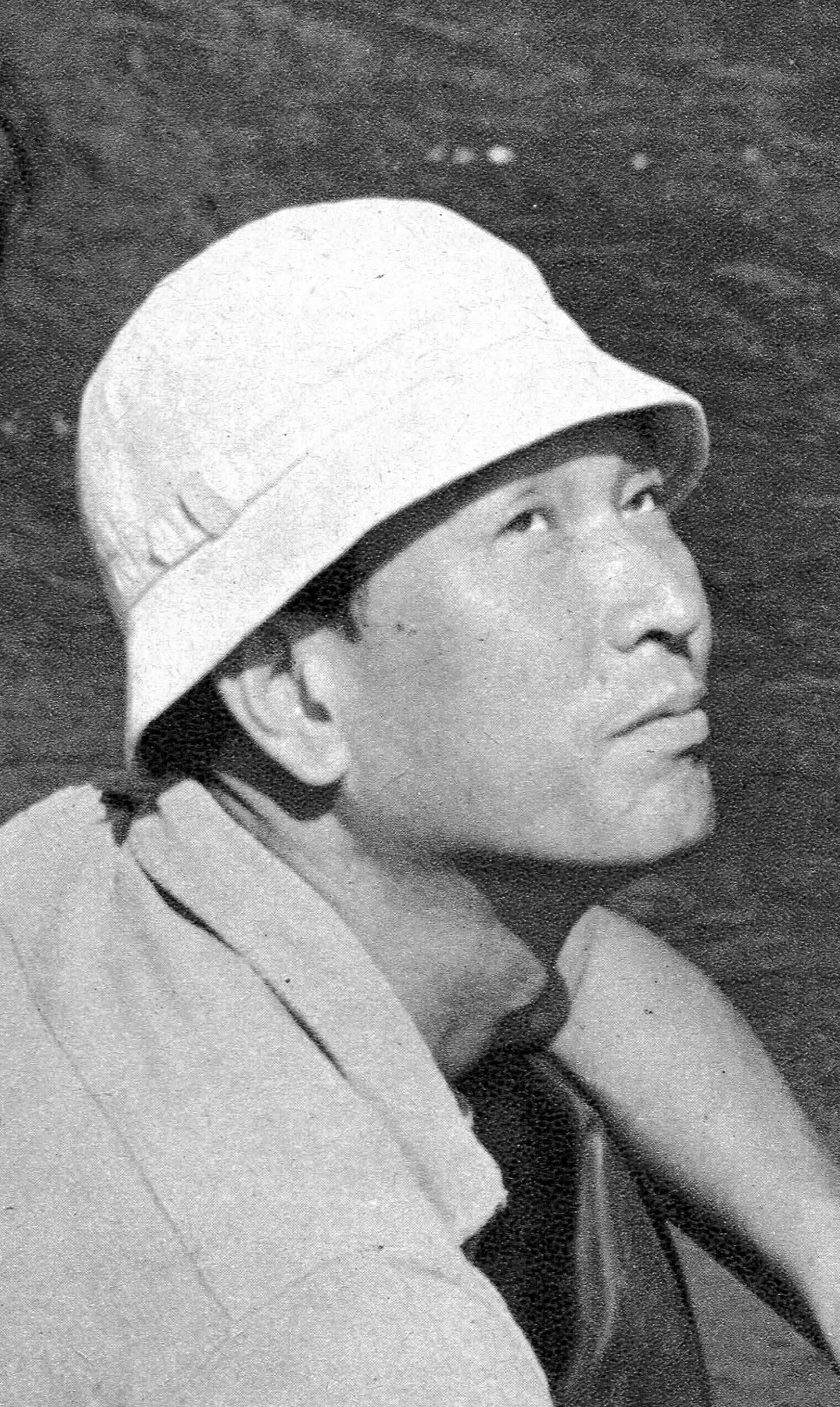
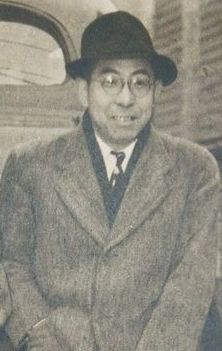
Screenwriters Akira Kurosawa in 1953 and Hideo Oguni in 1949

During the occupation of Japan, authorities had deliberately suppressed the production of samurai films as they were seen to embody the anti-democratic, feudal values of Japan's wartime government. When the occupation forces left in the early 1950s, the Japanese public still held an interest in stories about the samurai. Kurosawa himself wanted to re-examine and make a new type of jidaigeki, or period drama, film. After the completion of Ikiru (1952), director Akira Kurosawa and his collaborator Shinobu Hashimoto planned to write a script following the daily routine of a single samurai, who at the end of the film would have to commit seppuku for a mistake made during the day. The project stalled as no records could be found concerning the samurai's everyday activities (for example, what and where he might eat). (Note: According to Hashimoto, Kurosawa was furious when he found out the project had been unilaterally abandoned by the screenwriter since he had not been involved in writing the initial treatment. Hashimoto's research would later become the basis for the script of Harakiri (1962).) Kurosawa next proposed a project adapting the Hongō Bugei Shōden, a collection of stories based on the biography of the Edo period martial artist Hinatsu Shigetaka. Hashimoto wrote a draft script, but Kurosawa abandoned the idea. Continuing to research the period, Kurosawa found an article that detailed the story of a group of samurai who were hired by peasants to protect them from bandits. In November 1952, Hashimoto wrote an informal script that came to 500 pages in length. The individual characters were based on real martial arts masters.

In December, Kurosawa, Hashimoto, and Hideo Oguni went to a ryokan inn in Atami to write a full screenplay. Kurosawa made detailed notes on the characteristics of each individual samurai, including the way they would talk and how they tied their shoes. Additionally, he created family trees for the residents of the village and instructed the actors to live together as if they were real families during the shoot. Kurosawa described his and Hashimoto's role as "technical" screenwriters, while Oguni was the humanist "soul". The three screenwriters had developed six samurai, but decided to include the character of Kikuchiyo as they considered the other characters too serious to be entertaining. The script was written over a period of more than six weeks. They wrote the same scene by themselves and would then present their work to the others, whereupon the best ideas would be compiled. Oguni was the screenwriter who had the ultimate decision over a script's readiness; this led to complete rejections that required everybody to re-write their version of a scene. During the writing process Kurosawa suffered from back pain from prolonged sitting on the tatami mats, and became sick with roundworms.

After the script was finished, the film spent three months in preproduction, much of the time used for location scouting. It was decided that the village would be filmed using five separate locations, with the main village scene being a studio set that required twenty three houses to be built. Kurosawa hired Yoshio Inaba (a stage actor) because he wanted someone who could act as both humble and mature. Inaba's relative inexperience in film productions, however, saw Kurosawa single him out for abuse by making him perform physical exercises. Seiji Miyaguchi was also primarily a stage actor, he had worked with Kurosawa as a character actor since the director's first film, Sanshiro Sugata (1943), and was cast as Kyuzo—the part that had originally been intended for Mifune before Kikuchiyo was written. Keiko Tsushima was cast as the female love interest for the character Katsushiro without a formal interview. It was her first film working as a freelance actress. Many of the other actors were either people Kurosawa had worked with before, or non-actors. Prior to shooting, there were four weeks of rehearsals, during which cast members were required to maintain character and dress in costume.

=== Filming ===
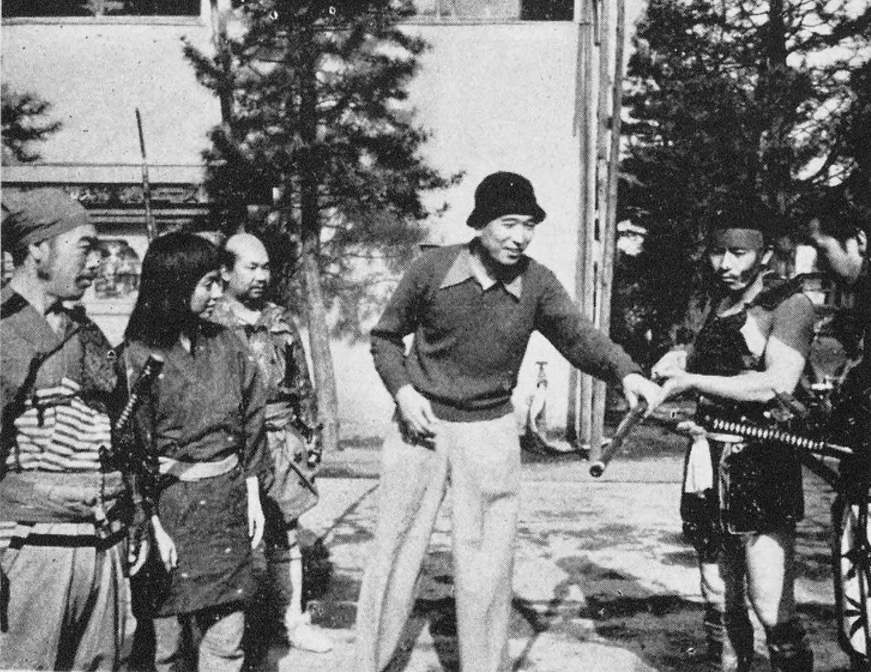
Kurosawa directing the actors on-set

Filming began on May 27, 1953, with the argument scene between characters Rikichi and Manzo just before they witness the samurai Kambei rescue a child from a criminal. The film's cinematographer was Asakazu Nakai, with Takao Saitō as assistant cinematographer. Many of the shooting locations were on or close to sets at Toho Studios (including many of the film's indoor scenes, and the village center which was on the edge of a set in Setagaya Ward), but no single location could be used to cover the whole area, so additional filming took place in Shizuoka Prefecture and Hakone in Kanagawa Prefecture. Production fell behind schedule due to the changes in location shooting, bad weather, and Kurosawa's own perfectionism. Forty horses were brought in for the film, but transporting them to the five different village locations proved impossible logistically, so it was decided to use local horses that were painted to look the same. Mifune stayed in character throughout the production. In advance of the scene where he cries holding a baby whose mother has just been killed, the actor drank a large quantity of sake in order to outwardly display raw emotion. The martial artist Yoshio Sugino was hired as a swordplay instructor for the film. Seiji Miyaguchi later credited his experience working for Kurosawa for molding him into an actor, reflecting that at the time Kurosawa cast him as the expert swordsman, he had never used or carried a sword.

When asked in a 1963 interview about the development of his cinematic technique, Kurosawa responded:

In The Idiot and Ikiru I returned to quiet composition, but in Seven Samurai I resumed my dynamic on a more original basis. This time I tried to add my sensitivity as a painter to what I hoped was my increasing knowhow as a filmmaker. The emphasis in my films thus shifted to a dynamic beauty, in contrast to the period when I seemed preoccupied with static beauty.

In mid-July 1953, Kurosawa had to go to hospital to recover from the exhaustion of producing the film. Galbraith speculates that it was during his recovery in this period that Kurosawa permitted Mifune to perform in Ishirō Honda's Eagle of the Pacific (1953). Kurosawa returned to the set on August 1. Toho had originally given the film a production budget of around $150,000–$200,000, (Note: Equivalent to $1,805,037 to $2,406,716 in 2025) and slated production to finish on August 18 in order to open in October. However, at this point less than a third of Kurosawa's script had been shot and there was only $19,000 left. (Note: Equivalent to $228,638 in 2025) Yoshio Tsuchiya, who played the villager Rikichi, was an acting student at the time he was hired for the film. Misunderstanding the length of time shooting would take, he requested a ten day holiday after three months on set. Kurosawa denied his request but, fearing Tsuchiya's intention to leave, Kurosawa invited the actor to instead live with his family, which he did for two years. Faced with professional difficulties, Kurosawa feared that he may be replaced by the director Kunio Watanabe, who was able to make films quickly and within small budgets.

By September 1953, the production was suspended as there was no more money to finance it. Confident that the studio would back his direction, Kurosawa took a short break which he spent fishing. Toho decided to continue financing the production and filming resumed on October 3. The total budget for the film came to ¥210 million, or between $556,000, (Note: Equivalent to $6,690,672 in 2025) and $580,000. (Note: Equivalent to $6,979,478 in 2025) This made it the most expensive Japanese feature film made at the time. When production started again, Kurosawa became furious at a group of studio executives who decided to invite members of the media to view the filming of a battle scene; the following day Tsuchiya received nasty burns during a stunt that required him to be in close proximity to a burning barn. During filming for the scene where the samurai arrive at the village, Kurosawa planned a shot at the top of the mountain from which the village could be seen in the valley. The crew spent the entire day setting up for a single shot to be filmed just before sunset, but cameraman Asakazu Nakai and Kurosawa ended up debating when to start shooting the scene by looking at the light through the camera's viewfinder. Despite spending the entire day preparing, Nakai's hesitation delayed filming till the sun had set, and the scene was not shot. Every evening, Kurosawa would dine and drink with the cast and crew of the films at the ryokan inn they were staying in and review the day's work.

As filming continued into 1954, Toho began to pressure Kurosawa to finish filming. The last scene he chose to shoot—during the middle of winter—was the final battle in the village. Kurosawa believed that had he filmed this before the rest of the script, the studio would have forced him to stop production. Kurosawa, Hashimoto, and Oguni continued to revise the details of the battle until it was supposed to be filmed and kept the contents of it secret from the rest of the cast and crew. Kurosawa used a multi-camera setup in order to fully capture the momentum of large numbers of people in battle. The scene used telephoto lenses to adjust the audience's perception of the action. He did this by placing three cameras at differing angles and perspectives before editing the footage together. The scene took about two months to film, during which it snowed and the cast and crew risked frostbite in the cold temperature and artificial rain. After production finished Mifune had to be admitted to the hospital to recover. In total, Seven Samurai took 148 working days to shoot, and used 130,000 feet of film.

=== Music ===
While Kurosawa was preparing to make the film, he repeatedly listened to Antonin Leopold Dvořák's Symphony No. 9 in E minor. As production on the film was finishing, Kurosawa met with the film's composer, Fumio Hayasaka, to consult with him about the score. At this time Hayasaka was suffering from tuberculosis and often discussed his compositions with the arranger, Masaru Satō, while using an oxygen tank. The composer focused on the score for Seven Samurai, turning down other offers of work, and over the course of about two months he wrote 300 orchestral sketches. The music was recorded in the spring of 1954 over the course of two weeks. The film used magnetic tape recording which was a departure from Kurosawa's films, which had traditionally used optical recording—a one-take method that converted audio signals into light. The new technology allowed for the audio track to be re-recorded if any mistakes were made. Kurosawa and Hayasaka decided not to use music in the film's final battle sequence in order to heighten the scene's sense of realism. The folk song used in the film's final scene is also an original composition of Hayasaka's. He wrote it after researching 300 contemporary words and phrases of the Sengoku Period.

Fumio Hayasaka – "Samurai Theme"
Hayasaka scored the "Samurai Theme" in multiple variations as a leitmotif associated with Kambei individually and the samurai as a whole.

The film critic Atsushi Kobayashi identifies the film's five key pieces of music as the "Samurai Theme", "Kikuchiyo's Mambo", "Shino's Theme", "Peasant's Theme", and "Ronin's Theme". The main "Samurai Theme" was originally rejected by Hayasaka, but he rediscovered it after the director turned down all of the composer's prior suggestions. Lyrics were also written for the theme. Sung by Yoshiko Yamaguchi, they were used only in a later image song released in November 1954. The composer recorded five trumpets for the "Samurai Theme" to play after the funeral of Heihachi. The music was recorded outside, but Hayasaka was not satisfied with the sound, so they continued through the night until dawn the following day. In recognition of his work on the film, Hayasaka's name appears alone in the film's credits, which was highly unusual in the Japanese film industry for the time.

== Themes ==
Seven Samurai is a genre epic that contains themes of class and altered identity. The film's drama focuses on the core group of seven samurai and their heroism, which is dramatized and tragic. The translator and academic Audie Bock considers the film to embody humanitarian values developed through the planning, execution, and horrors of warfare. To film historian Donald Richie, the film is about both the individual and the social group. He analyzes the samurai as individual characters and frames their actions through an understanding of heroism that is stoic and generous to others, even to the samurai's own detriment. Through the film's presentation of the samurai and their deaths, the ending has been read variously as hopeful, ironic, and as a metaphor for the obsolescence of the samurai class. The film critic Stuart Galbraith IV views the ending as the samurai becoming disillusioned with the peasants and the peasants already forgetting the sacrifice of the samurai. For Professor of English Joan Mellen, the scene is instead an elegy for the moral decline of contemporary Japanese society.

The scholar Mitsuhiro Yoshimoto contextualizes Seven Samurai within the historical context of the jidaigeki genre. To him, Kurosawa's individualization of different characters and their balance within and between different social groups is a unique iteration on established conventions among studio films for the time. The integration of different people with social groups is established by framing characters together with their social groups in the shot. The film theorist Stephen Prince describes Kurosawa's use of montage and multi-camera setup as a formalistic approach that causes a "fragmentation of his images". Prince discusses how Kurosawa would use camera placement and editing to re-order characters within the cinematic space. The differing angles represent changes to the social relations between the film's characters.

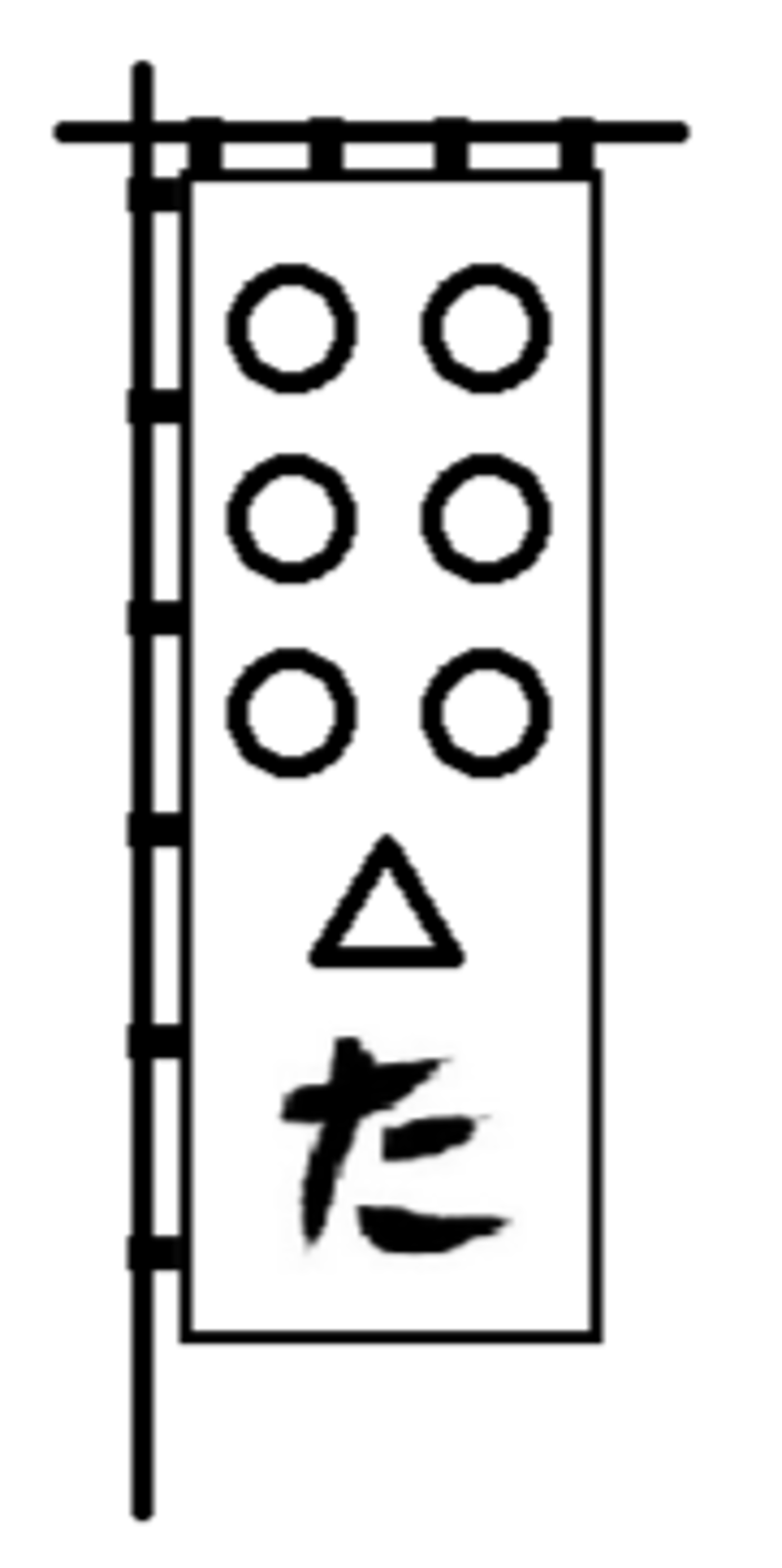
The nobori is a symbol of the new relations between the samurai and the peasants.

Scholars have utilized a dialectical approach to the film. Professor of cinema David Desser notes that Kurosawa's work is informed by a dialectic between formalism and humanism. He sees Seven Samurai's dialectic playing out in the film's structure and editing, as well as within narrative elements of the film's text. Dialectics have also been used as a means to discuss the film's approach to class struggle and mobility between classes. A symbolic link showing the changed relationship between the social groups of samurai and peasants is found in the nobori, which depicts both the samurai as individual shapes, and the peasants as a collective. The samurai are adherents to the warrior code of bushidō, with their deaths by firearms being a moral critique of Western influence. According to Desser, their defense of the peasants is made more heroic and more human as a result of this. The character of Kikuchiyo has been identified as embodying a confused or unified vision of class. The character's speech about the suffering of the peasants implicates everyone in social and moral failures among different classes.

Analyses of the film's depiction of environment have looked at the relationship between the characters and the village. The use of rain in the film is considered an emotional cue. The philosopher Gilles Deleuze considers rain in Seven Samurai to symbolize the layout of space and environment in the film that makes certain character actions possible. Deleuze refers to Kurosawa as "one of the greatest film-makers of rain". Film critic Kenneth Turan considers the film's runtime to embody the agricultural year itself. Scholar of anthropology Dolores Martinez sees the natural world to be inextricably tied to the role of women in the film. The relationship between samurai and bandit with the peasants is seen in the relationship between Katsushiro and the village girl Shino, as well as the villager Rikichi and his kidnapped wife. Both relationships are seen as dishonorable, but the latter represents a "self-betrayal" of family and home—because Rikichi tried to bargain with the bandits by giving up his wife—that the film's women urge the peasants to resist.

Richie sees the use of music as a means by which the different social groups are divided, since the motifs for the samurai, peasants, and bandits are heard together but are not played at the same time. According to Kobayashi, a major theme of the film's music is the leitmotif, a technique using fixed tones, melodies, and rhythms to evoke an idea. In Seven Samurai the technique is used as the core of the film's music and is arranged around moments of characterization. Kobayashi analyzes the film's main "Samurai Theme" as an embodiment of the romanticism and heroism of the samurai. To him, the film's different arrangements of the "Samurai Theme" act as the center of the film's musical direction. He also analyzes "Kikuchiyo's Mambo" as a form of music uncommon to a period piece that juxtaposes the characters of Kikuchiyo and Kambei. The film theorists David Bordwell and Kristin Thompson analyze Seven Samurai as having a dense sound stream, wherein the soundtrack introduces layers to build tension and mark changes in the narrative while providing an auditory experience that is not limited to a single perspective.

== Release ==
=== Theatrical ===
Before Seven Samurai was released the press had already attacked it. Toho cut a trailer together that referenced the film's controversially long and expensive production, and likened the film to Gone With the Wind (1939) in its epic scale. To appeal to a female audience, Keiko Tsushima and Yukiko Shimazaki were given third and fourth billing in advertisements. Seven Samurai was released in Japan on April 26, 1954. The film's runtime came to 207 minutes, which at the time was the longest Japanese film ever produced. The full-length roadshow version was later cut to 160 minutes for general release. The first full-length cut was only shown for a few weeks in major cities. When the second cut down version was shown in rural areas, some theaters booked the film in two parts so people could watch over several days. At the film's completion party on April 29, Kurosawa's wife Yōko Yaguchi went into labor, giving birth to Kazuko. The film's second, theatrical, cut was re-issued in Japan in 1955 and 1967, with the original 207 minute cut re-released in 1975 and 1991.

The film was recut a third time to enter the Venice Film Festival. (Note: According to Galbraith, it was a studio decision taken by Toho, perhaps to pre-empt criticism that the film was too long. Kobayashi writes that it was Kurosawa himself who re-edited the film in order to submit it and comply with the festival's regulations.) Despite its success at the festival, the film did not receive an offer for foreign distribution. Co-screenwriter Shinobu Hashimoto later considered that the studio should have produced a version dubbed into English rather than the subtitled version. Toho held a screening at the Ambassador Hotel in Los Angeles in January 1955, but did not receive any offers for distribution until August 1955, when Columbia Pictures expressed interest. Prior to a wider release, the picture premiered in America at the Linda Lea theater in July 1956 to meet the requirements for Academy Award consideration. The film premiered in Australia at the 1956 Melbourne International Film Festival.

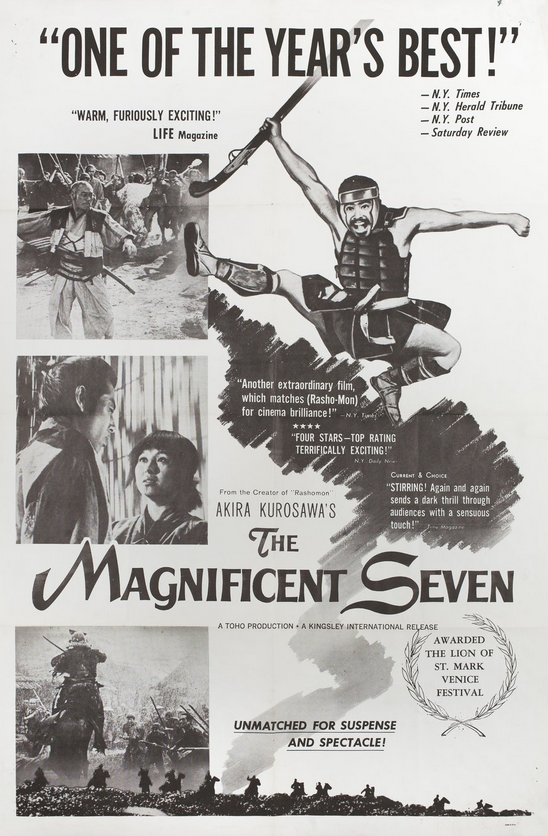
American release poster for Seven Samurai, released under the title The Magnificent Seven.

Seven Samurai was released in the United States by Columbia with English subtitles in November 1956. The film officially opened at the Guild Theatre in New York under the title The Magnificent Seven. The feature started to be screened at the cinema on November 19, with an initial runtime of 155 minutes, which was then edited down by about 15 minutes to accommodate more screenings. The American version came to 141 minutes long. One source indicates that an English dubbed version was also available in the country. When The Magnificent Seven was released in 1960, Kurosawa's film was subsequently known by its original title Seven Samurai. The 160 minute Japanese theatrical cut was re-released in the United States during the 1960s by Toho International. The uncut version of the film was allegedly shown briefly in Los Angeles in 1969. A 200 minute cut was broadcast on PBS-TV in 1972. A December 1982 re-release ran at 203 minutes, with every subsequent re-release adhering to the original cut's length.

=== Home media ===
The film received a US LaserDisc release. A VHS version was released by Home Vision Cinema, and a DVD by The Criterion Collection. Commenting on the DVD release in 2006, The Los Angeles Times reported that the film had been restored using digital corrections to a duplicate negative, and also had a new 4.0 sound mix. The DVD came with additional bonus features which included commentary tracks from various academics, an interview between Kurosawa and director Nagisa Ōshima, and a documentary about the making of the film titled It's Wonderful to Create. The British Film Institute released the film as part of a box set of Kurosawa's samurai films in 2010. Seven Samurai was the third best-selling film released by the BFI for the year 2015, and the highest-selling overall as of that point. Criterion released a Blu-ray version of Seven Samurai in October 2010.

=== 4K restoration ===
In 2016, Toho carried out a 4K restoration, along with Kurosawa's Ikiru (1952). As the whereabouts of Seven Samurai's original negative is unknown, the transfer was made using a master positive and duplicate negative elements. The 4K restoration debuted at the 2024 Cannes Film Festival, before being released theatrically later that year in the United States and United Kingdom. A limited theatrical re-release of the restored film took place in Japan in October 2025. A 4K Blu-ray was released on home video in November 2024 by Criterion and the BFI.

== Reception ==
=== Box office ===
Seven Samurai was successful with Japanese audiences. The film grossed ¥290 million in ticket sales in Japan. Of the gross, the distributor rental income was ¥268 million. (Note: Equivalent to ¥1.8 billion in 2024) Most of the total ticket sales were at Toho-owned cinemas, increasing their share of the profit. Samurai was the highest grossing film of that year, but it was not massively profitable due to its high budget. When the original 207 minute cut was re-issued in Japan in 1975, the film grossed $160,000. (Note: Equivalent to $957,328 in 2025) The re-release in 1991 accrued $2.2 million. (Note: Equivalent to $5,200,342 in 2025) According to film journalist Masaaki Tsuzuki writing in 1998, following its initial release in Japan, the film earned over seven times its ¥210 million budget; accruing a distribution revenue of ¥1.5 billion. (Note: Equivalent to ¥1.65 billion in 2024)

In the film's initial 1956 run at the Guild Theatre in New York, it grossed $68,000 in total. (Note: Variety magazine reported $68,000 in ticket sales from the Guild Theatre by the end of the film's run in January 1957. Equivalent to $805,263 in 2025.) Additional takings across the country between January and December 1957—with screenings beginning in St. Louis—brought the total to $145,800. The film's original release in Australia grossed $193,316. A re-issue of Samurai in 2002 saw it accrue $275,965. (Note: Equivalent to $493,978 in 2025) The film's re-release in the same year as part of a multi-title 'Kurosawa & Mifune Festival' accrued $561,692 for all twelve films in total. (Note: Equivalent to $1,005,434 in 2025) A 2021 re-release in the United Kingdom grossed $23,485 in total. (Note: Equivalent to $27,903 in 2025) The 4K re-release for the film's 70th anniversary in 2024 saw the film gross $552,530 internationally. (Note: Equivalent to $567,066 in 2025)

=== Critical response ===
==== Contemporary opinion ====
According to Stuart Galbraith, Japanese reviews responded well to Seven Samurai, but the film's popularity impacted critical assessment. Tsuzuki writes that Japanese critics ranked the film third on the Kinema Junpo Best Ten list because they were cold to films that had mass appeal. Peter Wild characterizes the reaction from Japanese critics as one of "an almost willful lack of understanding". Richie notes that some critics gave thoughtful analyses, but he gives examples of contemporary opinions that questioned whether the film was anti-democratic for condemning the peasants. Mellen writes that Kurosawa was upset by the attempts of critics to read meaning into his work that was not there; and that their readings lacked nuance. In addition, he felt that he had been branded as someone whose work was more "western" than Japanese.

Galbraith mentions a report in The New York Times from a reporter who saw the original cut of the film in Japan and criticized its length. Variety magazine, in a review of the film's shortened version screened at the Venice Film Festival, also criticized the film's length, although it considered it the film's "lone drawback". The review commended the film's action and editing, and singled out Mifune for praise. Overall, the film was well-received when it was shown at Venice. Gavin Lambert from Sight and Sound magazine referred to the film as, "an adventure story of the best kind" and praised Kurosawa's composition; however, he considered Kenji Mizoguchi's Sansho the Bailiff (1954) to be more satisfying overall.

Critical reception upon the film's 1956 release in the United States was positive, but Galbraith writes that it was "tainted with a kind of cultural condescension". Some critics dismissively compared Kurosawa's film to American Westerns. The Los Angeles Times wrote a positive review, as did Marjory Adams in The Boston Globe, although Adams speculated, "with no attempt to belittle" Kurosawa's film, that Samurai had adapted its shots from Western genre movies. In The Saturday Review, Arthur Knight used the comparison of the Western to highlight deeper formalistic and psychological aspects that served to reinvigorate genre elements. In a 1958 Cahiers du Cinéma article by the director Jacques Rivette, he compared Kurosawa to Mizoguchi. Rivette labelled Seven Samurai a "facile success", and wrote that Kurosawa's approach was overrefined in its use of Western cinematic techniques.

Following the initial American theatrical release, Bosley Crowther of The New York Times considered the film to be one of the five best foreign films of 1956. He wrote in November of that year that Samurai was technically brilliant, but too long and repetitious in its imagery. Five days later, he wrote a second review where he questioned the accuracy of the film's depiction of feudal Japan while conceding that Kurosawa had still succeeded in conveying a sense of period authenticity. Also writing in 1956, New York Daily News critic Wanda Hale favorably compared Seven Samurai to Kurosawa's earlier film Rashomon (1950). She praised Samurai's depictions of violence, humor, and romance; commenting on Kurosawa's "deep perception of human nature". Judith Crist referred to the 1964 American theatrical re-release of Seven Samurai's 160 minute cut as "a magnificent film".

==== Retrospective opinion ====
Retrospective analysis of the Seven Samurai has seen critics and scholars consider the film a masterpiece. On the review aggregator website Rotten Tomatoes, the film has a perfect approval rating of 100% based on 104 reviews. On Metacritic, it received a 98 out of 100 based on seven critical reviews. In Sight and Sound's 1982 critics' poll, Samurai was voted the third greatest film of all time. In the 1992 poll, the film placed ninth; the 2022 poll saw the film rank in twentieth place. In January 2002, the film was included on the National Society of Film Critics' 100 essential films. A 2018 international poll of 209 critics conducted by the BBC voted Seven Samurai the best foreign-language film. A poll of filmmakers and film critics by Time Out magazine in 1995 celebrating a centenary of film saw Seven Samurai rank fifth. In 2025, the film was ranked at number seven on Time Out's list of "The 100 Best Movies of All Time". Empire magazine voted Samurai the greatest film of world cinema in 2010. A 2007 readers' poll in The Guardian voted the film the third best foreign film.

When the original cut of the film was shown outside of Japan in 1975, it was praised as a flagship of Japanese cinema. Joan Mellen characterizes the film as "the least written about and most misunderstood of Kurosawa's films, both in Japan and abroad." She attributes this feeling to an overemphasis on theory among Western critics. A retrospective review in Kinema Junpo magazine, written by screenwriter Kazuo Kasahara in 1975 praised the film. Kasahara wrote that the film's main drama is based on the faith that the peasants and samurai would have shared contemporaneously, with the peasants seeing their identity within the group to embody an absolute principle, whereas the samurai place the absolute within the power of the individual. Writing a five star review for The Guardian in 2021, Peter Bradshaw noted that the samurai instruct the peasants in Zen Buddhist teachings of an acceptance of danger.

At a 1972 symposium of Japanese directors and film critics, participants generally expressed a negative attitude towards Seven Samurai and Kurosawa's films more broadly. The critic Michitarō Tada accused the film of lacking psychological conflict; both he and Tadao Satō agreed that Kurosawa took a condescending view towards the peasant characters. The filmmaker Nagisa Ōshima criticized the film for not converting the collective fight into individual conflict. Samurai was blamed for depicting a gap that was too large between the central figure of the samurai and the other characters. Satō later blamed the film for justifying Japanese rearmament and the establishment of the Japan Self-Defence Forces in 1954, an act he believed contravened the peace clause of the Japanese Constitution. In the 2018 BBC poll of critics, not a single Japanese film critic voted for Seven Samurai. In a 2024 review for The New York Times, J. Hoberman praised the film's emotional and political resonance while criticizing Kurosawa's identification with the film's samurai protagonists as elitist.

The film critic Roger Ebert included it on his list of Great Movies. In a four out of four star review, he considered the film to embody a humanistic attitude that encouraged rebellion against social tradition. In questioning why Seven Samurai continues to remain popular, Anne Billson writes that its "emotions and mythologies" contain a universality, and that its formalistic elements remain powerful. Philip Horne, writing for The Daily Telegraph in 2008, conveyed similar views about the film's formalistic strengths. The film critic David Ehrenstein wrote in 1999 that what makes Samurai unique among action films is its commitment to a blurred sense of morality as the samurai protect the villagers who had themselves hunted other samurai. As a result, the samurai's sense of honor comes as a test of themselves.

=== Accolades ===
Award	Date of ceremony	Category	Recipient(s)	Result	Ref.
Academy Awards	March 27, 1957	Best Art Direction (Black-and-White)	Takashi Matsuyama	Nominated	
Academy Awards	March 27, 1957	Best Costume Design (Black-and-White)	Kōhei Ezaki	Nominated	
British Academy Film Awards	March 1, 1956	BAFTA Award for Best Film	Seven Samurai	Nominated	
British Academy Film Awards	March 1, 1956	BAFTA Award for Best Foreign Actor	Toshirō Mifune	Nominated	
British Academy Film Awards	March 1, 1956	BAFTA Award for Best Foreign Actor	Takashi Shimura	Nominated	
Jussi Awards	November 18, 1959	Directing	Akira Kurosawa	Honorary Mention (Note: No awards were given to non-Finnish films.)	
Jussi Awards	November 18, 1959	Acting	Takashi Shimura	Honorary Mention	
Kinema Junpo Best Ten	1954	Best Ten List	Seven Samurai	Third	
Mainichi Film Awards	1955	Best Supporting Actor	Seiji Miyaguchi	Won	
New York Film Critics Circle Awards	January 19, 1957	Best Foreign Language Film	Seven Samurai	Nominated	
Venice Film Festival	September 7, 1954	Silver Lion	Akira Kurosawa	Won (Note: Along with Sansho the Bailiff, La Strada, and On the Waterfront.)	

== Legacy ==
Kurosawa innovated the use of a multi-camera setup and telephoto lenses to shoot action. Shown here are three different angles from the same shoot.

Seven Samurai is considered to be one of the greatest films ever made. David Desser claims that the film is one of the "most oft remade, reworked, referenced films in all of cinema history". The film is influential among western filmmakers, particularly for its use of a multi-camera setup for shooting action. Kurosawa innovated this style of shooting in conjunction with the use of extreme telephoto lenses. Richie, along with the director Joseph L. Anderson, specify Kurosawa's use of slow motion and editing as an element of the film's technical experimentation. The cultural essayist Inuhiko Yomota writes that Seven Samurai created a blueprint for action cinema. The film's camera movements have had a large impact on the genre's cinematic grammar. Anne Billson also credits the film for popularizing the "assembling the team" trope in movies.

Writing in 1998, Tsuzuki states that Kurosawa's work on Seven Samurai revolutionized the methods and scale of Japanese film production. Yoshimoto attributes to Kurosawa an innovation of the jidaigeki genre for not adapting stories contemporary to the period of depiction, and for shooting new types of sword fights in narratives with clear symbolism and mature underlying themes. However, he believes that Seven Samurai did not change the patterns of production and consumption of jidaigeki films when it was released in Japan. In his analysis, these patterns remained until the Toei Company—the studio most associated with the genre—began to see a lower profit margin by the releases of Yojimbo (1961), Sanjuro (1962), and the Japanese release of The Magnificent Seven in the early 1960s. Desser, however, attributes to Samurai "a renaissance" of the genre, and describes it as the first film in "the postwar Golden Age" of samurai films. Professor of Film Studies David Cook considers Kurosawa's efforts in Seven Samurai along with his later work Throne of Blood (1957) to have elevated the jidaigeki genre to a higher art form.

In an interview for the Criterion Collection, the director George Lucas cited Seven Samurai as his favorite film by Akira Kurosawa. The Soviet filmmaker Andrei Tarkovsky listed it as his seventh favorite film ever made. Tarkovsky referenced the final shot of Kikuchiyo's body plastered in mud as the rain washes it off as an example of a cinematic image—an image that is unique and factual, devoid of symbolism. Martin Scorsese included Seven Samurai on a list of "39 Essential Foreign Films for a Young Filmmaker" in 2014. Filmmaker Denis Villeneuve cited the film as one of his 29 favorite movies, and used Samurai as a reference for depicting violence when making Sicario (2015). The director John Woo has also said that he uses the film as a reference for the way all his films are shot. Wes Anderson has been influenced by the film, using the "Samurai Theme" from the movie's soundtrack for his film Isle of Dogs (2018).

Joan Mellen writes that Seven Samurai is a great work of art within both cinema and the history of civilization. In Helen DeWitt's first novel, The Last Samurai, the film takes on a thematic role in the story. The Japanese anime Samurai 7 was conceived as a futuristic remake of the film. The drum and bass artist Photek released a song named after Seven Samurai; and the video game Ghost of Tsushima was influenced by the film, including a "Kurosawa Mode" wherein players could play the game with a black and white filter as an homage to the director's movies. In Japan, there have also been pachinko machines based on the film. There was speculation that Kurosawa considered Seven Samurai his favorite of the films he produced. However, when asked in 1993 what his favorite film was, he stated that it was too difficult to choose. Speaking to his daughter in 1994, he claimed that his interests changed and that if asked to make the film at that point in his life, he would die.

=== Remakes ===
Seven Samurai was remade in America as The Magnificent Seven (1960). Toho sold the rights to remake the film to American producer Lou Morheim. Morheim offered the rights to Anthony Quinn and Yul Brynner who wanted to remake Samurai as a Western. Magnificent Seven's success inspired an international movement to emulate samurai films that produced the spaghetti Western. However, in an interview with R. B. Gadi, Kurosawa expressed his belief that, "the American copy is a disappointment, although entertaining. It is not a version of Seven Samurai". Following subsequent re-releases of Seven Samurai and the three sequels to the American Magnificent Seven, Kurosawa, Oguni, and Hashimoto sued Toho to reclaim compensation and rights to the film. The ruling by the Tokyo District Court in 1978 found that the filmmakers had granted a license for a single remake, and faulted MGM and United Artists for the production of the Magnificent Seven sequels. The 2016 remake of The Magnificent Seven also credits Seven Samurai for its source material.

Battle Beyond the Stars (1980), an American science fiction film produced by Roger Corman, was conceived as a "Magnificent Seven in outer space"; Corman himself respected the samurai films of Kurosawa. Galbraith identifies Battle Beyond the Stars along with the war film The Dirty Dozen (1967) and the Pixar film A Bug's Life as examples of unofficial copies of Seven Samurai. Martinez also notes similarities between Samurai and A Bug's Life, which she (along with Three Amigos (1986) and Galaxy Quest (1999)) identifies as a comic legacy of how the film's structure has been adapted, though she frames the influence of Samurai's narrative techniques through discussions of modern action and drama films, including The Matrix Revolutions (2003) and The Lord of the Rings trilogy (2001–2003). The director Zack Snyder was inspired by the film when developing Rebel Moon (2023), which he initially pitched as a Star Wars film, describing his plan as "Seven Samurai in space". The Star Wars universe has seen multiple adaptations of the film in comic books, an episode of The Clone Wars, and an episode of The Mandalorian.

The Indian action film Sholay (1975), a "Curry Western" written by Salim–Javed (Salim Khan and Javed Akhtar) and directed by Ramesh Sippy, was also inspired by Seven Samurai. Sholay has been compared to Samurai for its thematic and story similarities concerning the moral code of its main characters, the aestheticization of violence, as well as for innovating cinematic techniques.

== See also ==
- Chanbara—A genre applied to period films that depict samurai
- Edo no Gekitou—A 1979 Japanese jidaigeki drama inspired by the film and produced by Toho
- List of historical drama films of Asia
