= The Magnificent Seven =

1960 film directed by John Sturges

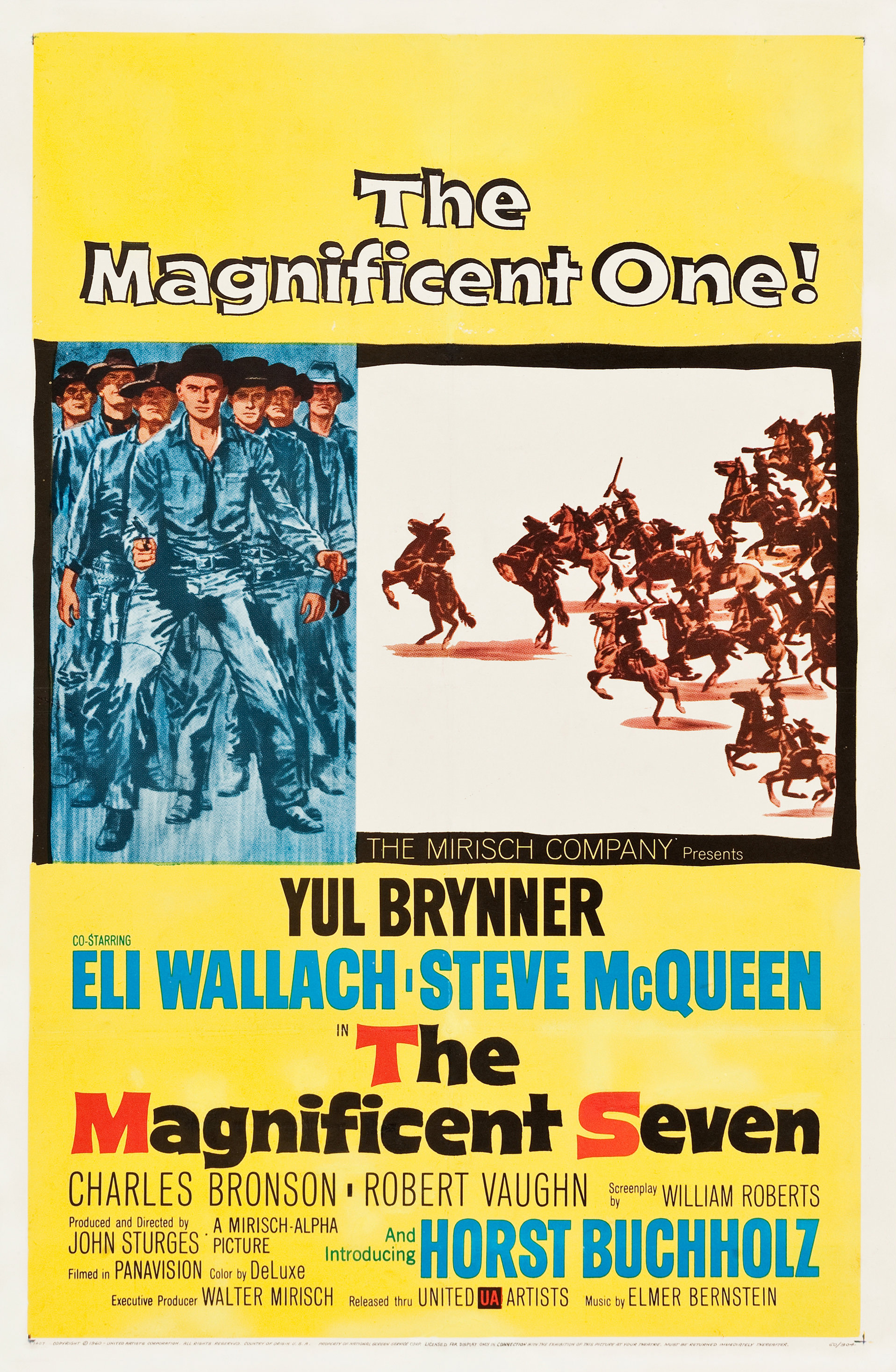
- Theatrical release poster
- Directed by: John Sturges
- Screenplay by: William Roberts; Uncredited: Walter Bernstein; Walter Newman
- Based on: Seven Samurai by: Akira Kurosawa; Shinobu Hashimoto; Hideo Oguni; (uncredited)
- Produced by: John Sturges
- Starring: Yul Brynner; Eli Wallach; Steve McQueen; Charles Bronson; Robert Vaughn; James Coburn; Horst Buchholz; Brad Dexter
- Cinematography: Charles Lang
- Edited by: Ferris Webster
- Music by: Elmer Bernstein
- Production companies: The Mirisch Company; Alpha Productions
- Distributed by: United Artists
- Release date: October 12, 1960
- Running time: 128 minutes
- Country: United States
- Language: English
- Budget: $2 million
- Box office: $9.75 million (rentals)

The Magnificent Seven is a 1960 American action Western film directed by John Sturges. The screenplay, credited to William Roberts, is a remake – in an Old West-style – of Akira Kurosawa's 1954 Japanese film Seven Samurai (itself initially released in the United States as The Magnificent Seven). The ensemble cast includes Yul Brynner, Steve McQueen, Horst Buchholz, Charles Bronson, Robert Vaughn, Brad Dexter and James Coburn as a group of seven gunfighters hired to protect a small village in Mexico from a group of marauding bandits led by the ruthless chief Calvera (Eli Wallach).

The film was released by United Artists on October 12, 1960, becoming both a critical and commercial success and has been appraised as one of the greatest films of the Western genre. It spawned three sequels, a television series that aired from 1998 to 2000, and a 2016 film remake. Elmer Bernstein's film score was nominated for an Academy Award for Best Original Score and is listed on the American Film Institute's list of the top 25 American film scores.

In 2013, the film was selected for preservation in the United States National Film Registry by the Library of Congress as being "culturally, historically, or aesthetically significant".

== Plot ==
An impoverished Mexican village is repeatedly raided for food and supplies by a gang of bandits led by Calvera. After Calvera kills a villager during one of these raids, the leaders consult an elder living as a hermit outside the village. He advises them to arm themselves and fight back. Three villagers are despatched with their few objects of value to try to barter for weapons. In a town just inside the United States, the villagers approach gunslinger Chris Adams who advises them to hire gunfighters, because "men are cheaper than guns."

Chris finds five willing gunmen: Vin Tanner, a gunfighter broke from gambling; Chris' friend Harry Luck, who assumes Chris is hiding a much bigger reward for the work; the Irish Mexican Bernardo O'Reilly, who has fallen on hard times; Britt, a marksman and expert knife fighter attracted by the challenges they'll face; and the dapper, on-the-run gunman Lee, plagued by nightmares of fallen enemies and no longer eager for battle. The group is followed back to the village by the hotheaded Chico, an aspiring gunfighter whose previous attempts to join Chris had been spurned. Impressed by his persistence, Chris allows him into the group. The gunfighters help the villagers build fortifications and train them for combat, puzzled by the absence of young women. When Chico stumbles upon Petra they learn the women were hidden in fear the gunmen would rape them. When Bernardo points out the gunmen are being given the choice food, they share it with the village children.

Three of Calvera's men reconnoiter the village and are killed by the seven due to a mistake by Chico. Calvera and his bandits arrive in force a few days later, and are met with gunfire. Eleven gang members are killed and the rest are driven away. As the villagers celebrate, Chico infiltrates Calvera's camp and learns they are short of food and likely to attack again. Some villagers fear reprisals and some of the seven sympathize, but Chris steadfastly insists the gunfighters stay. The seven launch a preemptive raid on Calvera's camp and find it abandoned. Calvera's gang captures them as they return to the village. Calvera spares their lives, believing them disillusioned by the knowledge some of the villagers betrayed them and colluded to give Calvera control. Preparing to return home to the United States, Chris and Vin admit they've become emotionally attached to the village and Britt vows vengeance on whoever took his gun from him. Chico, who has grown close to Petra, expresses his hatred for the villagers. Chris points out he grew up as a farmer as well, and Chico angrily replies that men like Calvera and Chris made the villagers what they are.

The gang escorts the seven gunmen from the village and return their weapons. Six of them agree to return and fight, and they infiltrate the village. A firefight ensues and Harry, the holdout, returns in time to save Chris's life before getting fatally shot. Lee bursts into a house where several villagers are being held, shoots their captors and releases the prisoners, and is gunned down as he leaves the house. Bernardo, shot protecting the boys he befriended, dies telling them to watch how bravely their fathers fought. Britt dies after killing many bandits. Chris shoots Calvera, who is incredulous that he returned, and the remaining bandits flee.

The three surviving gunfighters bid farewell to the village elder who tells them that while the villagers have won, the gunslingers are "like the wind, blowing over the land and passing on." Chico decides to stay with Petra. Passing by the graves of their fallen comrades with Vin, Chris admits the elder was right.

== Cast ==
=== The Seven ===
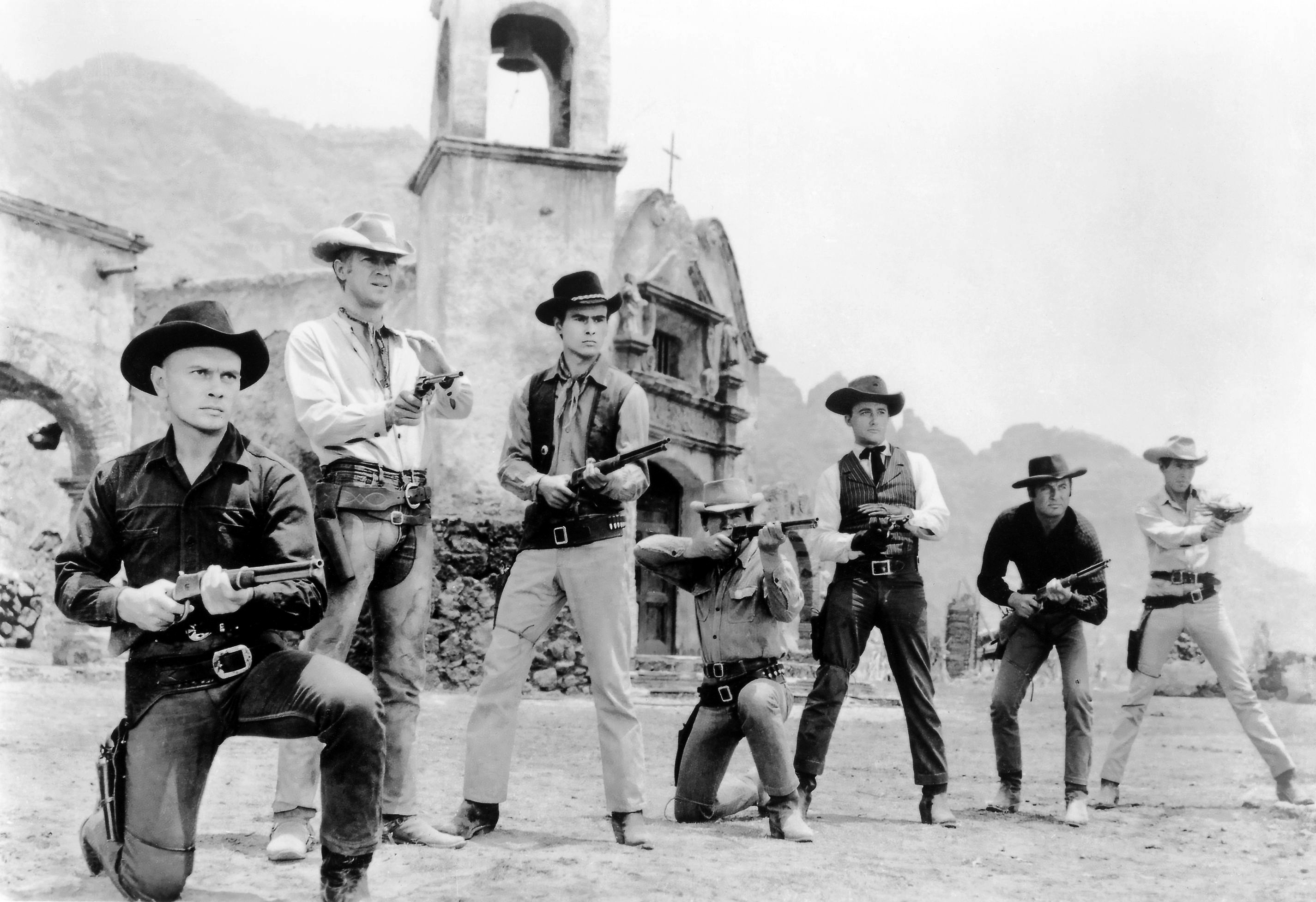
Cast publicity photo of "The Seven". Left to right: Yul Brynner, Steve McQueen, Horst Buchholz, Charles Bronson, Robert Vaughn, Brad Dexter, and James Coburn

- Yul Brynner as Chris Adams, a Cajun gunslinger, leader of the seven
- Steve McQueen as Vin Tanner, a drifter
- Charles Bronson as Bernardo O'Reilly, a professional in need of money
- Robert Vaughn as Lee, a traumatized veteran
- Brad Dexter as Harry Luck, a fortune seeker
- James Coburn as Britt, a knife expert
- Horst Buchholz as Chico, a young, hot-blooded shootist

=== Others ===
- Eli Wallach as Calvera, the bandit chief
- Vladimir Sokoloff as the old man of the village
- Jorge Martínez de Hoyos as Hilario
- Rosenda Monteros as Petra
- Rico Alaniz as Sotero
- Pepe Hern as Tomás
- Natividad Vacío as Salvador
- Robert J. Wilke as Wallace
- John A. Alonzo as Miguel
- Roberto Contreras as Luis
- Whit Bissell as Chamlee, the undertaker
- Val Avery as Henry, the corset salesman
- Bing Russell as Robert, Henry's traveling companion
- Valentin de Vargas as Santos, a Calvera henchman
- Joseph Ruskin as Flynn

== Production ==
=== Development ===
Lou Morheim acquired rights to remake Seven Samurai in the US for $2,500. He later signed a deal with Yul Brynner's production company, who bought the rights from Morheim for $10,000 up front plus $1,000 a week as a producer and 5% of the net profits. Anthony Quinn was lined up to star with Brynner as director but later Martin Ritt was appointed as director with Brynner starring.

Brynner approached producer Walter Mirisch with the idea of remaking Kurosawa's famous samurai film. However, once Mirisch had acquired the rights and finalized a deal with United Artists, Brynner was sued for breach of contract by Quinn, who claimed that he and Brynner had developed the concept together and had worked out many of the film's details before the two had a falling out. Quinn ultimately lost his claim because there was nothing in writing.

The film's title comes from the initial American localized title of Seven Samurai, which was initially released under the title The Magnificent Seven in the United States in 1955.

=== Writing ===
Script credit was a subject of contention. Associate producer Morheim commissioned Walter Bernstein, a blacklisted scriptwriter, to produce the first draft "faithfully" adapted from the original script written by Shinobu Hashimoto, Hideo Oguni and Akira Kurosawa; when Mirisch and Brynner took over the production, they brought on Walter Newman, whose version "is largely what's onscreen." When Newman was unavailable to be onsite during the film's principal photography in Mexico, William Roberts was hired, in part to make changes required by Mexican censors. When Roberts asked the Writers Guild of America for a co-credit, Newman asked that his name be removed from the credits.

=== Casting ===
Sturges was eager to cast Steve McQueen in the picture, having just worked with him on the 1959 film Never So Few, but McQueen could not get a release from actor/producer Dick Powell, who controlled McQueen's hit TV series Wanted Dead or Alive. On the advice of his agent, McQueen, an experienced race car driver, staged a car accident and claimed that he could not work on his series because he had suffered a whiplash injury and had to wear a neck brace. During the interval required for his "recuperation", he was free to appear in The Magnificent Seven. James Coburn was a great fan of the Japanese film Seven Samurai, having seen it 15 times while studying with Stella Adler. Not long before shooting, after meeting in the street the already-cast and former Los Angeles City College classmate Robert Vaughn, he was hired for his coveted role of the expert knifethrower that had been rejected by actors Sterling Hayden and John Ireland.

=== Filming ===
The film was shot by cinematographer Charles Lang in a 35 mm anamorphic format using Panavision lenses. Location shooting began on March 1, 1960, in Mexico, where both the village and the U.S. border town were built for the film. The location filming was in Cuernavaca, Durango, and Tepoztlán and at the Estudios Churubusco. The first scenes were the first part of the six gunfighters' journey to the Mexican village prior to Chico being brought into the group.

During filming there was considerable tension between Brynner and McQueen, who was displeased at his character having only seven lines of dialogue in the original shooting script. (Sturges had told McQueen that he would "give him the camera".) To compensate, McQueen took numerous opportunities to upstage Brynner and draw attention to himself, including shielding his eyes with his hat, flipping a coin during one of Brynner's speeches, and rattling his shotgun shells. Brynner would often build up a little mound of earth to make himself look as tall as McQueen, only to have McQueen kick the dirt out of place when he passed by. When newspapers started reporting about a rivalry, Brynner issued a press statement saying, "I never feud with actors. I feud with studios."

In an interview Eli Wallach recalled his own interaction with fellow players: "Bronson was a loner. He kept to himself. I liked Robert Vaughn and James Coburn very much. Vaughn is a very intelligent guy. He wrote a book on blacklisting. Coburn was one of those quiet types which fit his character very well: silent but a knife thrower of great skill."

== Music ==
=== Soundtrack ===
External audio
- You can listen to Elmer Bernstein's score for The Magnificent Seven performed in 1960 Here on archive.org

The film's score is by Elmer Bernstein, with orchestrations by Leo Shuken and Jack Hayes. Along with the readily recognized main theme and effective support of the story line, the score also contains allusions to twentieth-century symphonic works, such as the reference to Bartok's Concerto for Orchestra, second movement, in the tense quiet scene just before the shootout. The original soundtrack was not released at the time until reused and rerecorded by Bernstein for the soundtrack of Return of the Seven. Electric guitar cover versions by Al Caiola in the U.S. and John Barry in the U.K. were successful on the popular charts. A vocal theme not written by Bernstein was used in a trailer.

In 1994, James Sedares conducted a re-recording of the score performed by The Phoenix Symphony Orchestra, which also included a suite from Bernstein's score for The Hallelujah Trail, issued by Koch Records; Bernstein himself conducted the Royal Scottish National Orchestra for a performance released by RCA in 1997, but the original film soundtrack was not released until the following year by Rykodisc. (Varèse Sarabande issued this album in 1996, and reissued it in 2004.)

1. Main Title and Calvera (3:56)
2. Council (3:14)
3. Quest (1:00)
4. Strange Funeral/After The Brawl (6:48)
5. Vin's Luck (2:03)
6. And Then There Were Two (1:45)
7. Fiesta (1:11)
8. Stalking (1:20)
9. Worst Shot (3:02)
10. The Journey (4:39)
11. Toro (3:24)
12. Training (1:27)
13. Calvera's Return (2:37)
14. Calvera Routed (1:49)
15. Ambush (3:10)
16. Petra's Declaration (2:30)
17. Bernardo (3:33)
18. Surprise (2:08)
19. Defeat (3:26)
20. Crossroads (4:47)
21. Harry's Mistake (2:48)
22. Calvera Killed (3:33)
23. Finale (3:27)

At the 33rd Academy Awards, the score was nominated for Best Score of a Dramatic or Comedy Picture, losing to Ernest Gold's score for Exodus. In 2005, the score for The Magnificent Seven was listed at No. 8 on the American Film Institute's list of the top 25 American film scores. In June 2026, CBS News included the score in its list of the 250 essential American songs of the past 250 years.

=== In other media ===
Bernstein's score has frequently been quoted in the media and popular culture. Starting in 1963, the theme was used in commercials in the U.S. for Marlboro cigarettes for many years. The 1965 movie The Sons of Katie Elder used much of the same music. It was also used in the James Bond film Moonraker as Bond is riding through Rio de Janeiro; in the 2005 film The Ringer; in the 2015 film Hardcore Henry; as entrance music for the British band James; as well as in episodes of The Simpsons that had a "Western" theme (mainly in the episode titled "Dude, Where's My Ranch?"). The opening horn riff in Arthur Conley's 1967 hit "Sweet Soul Music" is borrowed from the theme. Canadian band Kon Kan use the opening bars of the theme in their single "I Beg Your Pardon". Celtic Football Club (Glasgow, Scotland) used the theme music whenever Henrik Larsson scored a goal. The 2008 J-pop song "Ōgoe Diamond" by AKB48 also used part of the main theme.

==== United States ====
The Cheers episode "Diane Chambers Day" (season 4, episode 22) revolves around the bar's regular customers being invited to watch The Magnificent Seven and ends with them singing an a cappella version of the theme.

The Mick Jones 1980s band Big Audio Dynamite covered the song as "Keep off the Grass", although this cover was not officially released. In 1995, the KLF also did a drum and bass cover of the main title as "The Magnificent"; it was released under the group alias One World Orchestra on the charity compilation The Help Album.

In 1992, the main theme of The Magnificent Seven came into use on a section of the Disneyland Railroad at Disneyland Paris. Portions of the theme play as the train exits the Grand Canyon diorama tunnel behind Phantom Manor, enters Frontierland, and travels along the bank of the Rivers of the Far West.

The "Main Title" was used as an introductory tune on many nights of Bruce Springsteen's 2012 Wrecking Ball World Tour. The theme was played as the E Street Band entered the stage, adding to the dramatic atmosphere in the stadium.

Composer David Yazbek quotes the main theme in the song "Man" from his 2000 stage musical The Full Monty.

== Theatrical release ==
The film opened on October 12, 1960, in a thousand theaters across the South and Southwest of the United States.

== Reception ==
=== Box office ===
In the United States and Canada, the film earned US$2.25 million in theatrical rentals and was a box office disappointment, but proved to be such a smash hit in Europe that it ultimately made a profit. The overseas rental was almost three times as much as in the U.S. with a total of $7.5 million, giving it worldwide rentals of $9.75 million. It was the second biggest hit of the year at the British box office in 1961.

In Western Europe, the film sold 7.3 million tickets in Italy, 7,037,826 tickets in France, and 7.7 million tickets in the United Kingdom, becoming one of the top 100 highest-grossing films in the United Kingdom and in France. It was also successful in Germany. In the Soviet Union (where Brynner was originally from), the film sold 67 million tickets, becoming the highest-grossing Hollywood film ever in the Soviet Union (where it was among only a handful of Hollywood films to become blockbusters there). In South Korea, it sold 80,870 tickets in Seoul City, and it was also successful in Japan. This adds up to a total of at least 89,118,696 tickets sold in overseas territories.

=== Critical response ===
Contemporary reviews were mixed to positive. Howard Thompson of The New York Times called the film a "pallid, pretentious and overlong reflection of the Japanese original"; according to Thompson, "don't expect anything like the ice-cold suspense, the superb juxtaposition of revealing human vignettes and especially the pile-driver tempo of the first Seven." According to Variety, "Until the women and children arrive on the scene about two-thirds of the way through, The Magnificent Seven is a rip-roaring rootin' tootin' western with lots of bite and tang and old-fashioned abandon. The last third is downhill, a long and cluttered anti-climax in which The Magnificent Seven grow slightly too magnificent for comfort." Richard L. Coe of The Washington Post called the film "rough, tough, funny and splashy most of the way. There's a serious dip the final third, but Keith's newcomer offers shrewd, vastly enjoyable performances." Harrison's Reports praised the film as "A superb Western, well acted and crammed full of action, human interest, pathos, suspense, plus some romance and humor."

A positive review from Charles Stinson in the Los Angeles Times praised the dialogue as "by turns, virile, rowdily funny and then, abruptly, not always predictably, it is pensive, even gentle. John Sturges' direction is superbly staccato; making a knife-sharp use of pauses and silences, it brings out both the humor and melancholy, the humanity as well as the evil inherent in the situation." The Monthly Film Bulletin called the casting of Yul Brynner and Horst Buchholz "curious" and thought Chico's decision to stay put was "the film's most completely unbelievable contrivance," but still thought that "the film manages to be both impressive and likeable."

Akira Kurosawa was reportedly so impressed by the film that he presented John Sturges with a sword, but said: "The American copy is a disappointment. Although entertaining, it is not a version of Seven Samurai."

The film has grown greatly in esteem since its release, partly because several of its cast went on to become superstars but also because of its music score and the quality of the script. On Rotten Tomatoes, the film has an approval score of 93% based on 80 reviews. The consensus reads, "The Magnificent Seven transplants Seven Samurai into the Old West with a terrific cast of Hollywood stars—and without losing any of the story's thematic richness." It is the second most shown film in U.S. television history, behind only The Wizard of Oz. The film is also ranked No. 79 on the AFI's list of American cinema's 100 most-thrilling films.

== Other media ==
=== Sequels ===
Three sequels were eventually made: Return of the Seven (1966), Guns of the Magnificent Seven (1969), and The Magnificent Seven Ride! (1972). Yul Brynner returned as Chris Adams for Return of the Seven, but was replaced in the sequels by George Kennedy and Lee Van Cleef. He was the only member of the cast to return for any of the sequels. None were as successful as the original film.

=== Television series ===
The film also inspired a television series, The Magnificent Seven, which ran from 1998 to 2000. Robert Vaughn was a recurring guest star, a judge who hires the seven to protect the town in which his widowed daughter-in-law and his grandson live.

After a previous attempt to reboot the series by Nic Pizzolatto for Prime Video, a second television series adaptation of the film developed by Tim Kring was announced to have been greenlit at MGM+ in December 2025.

=== Music ===
In 1981, The Clash released a song, "The Magnificent Seven", the third single from their fourth album, Sandinista!, which references the title of the 1960 film.

=== Unofficial remake ===
The 1980 science fiction film Battle Beyond the Stars was a remake of The Magnificent Seven set in space. A group of mercenaries, including ones played by George Peppard (as a character known only as "Space Cowboy") and Robert Vaughn (playing essentially the same character as in The Magnificent Seven) defend farmers from space raiders on the planet Akir, home of the Akira (named after Seven Samurai director Akira Kurosawa).

=== In popular culture ===
- The 1980s action-adventure series The A-Team was initially devised as a combination of The Dirty Dozen and The Magnificent Seven. The show's pilot film plays much on the plot of The Magnificent Seven, and there are similar plot echoes in various other episodes.
- Also in the 1980s, the British television series, Auf Wiedersehen, Pet, specifically the second series, heavily references the film. The first two episodes are called, "The Return of the Seven (Parts 1 and 2)" and the cast have a discussion during a stop on a motorway service area, each choosing an actor from the film that they feel best represents them. The soundtrack also references the main theme.
- Steven Spielberg's 2022 semi-autobiographical film The Fabelmans utilizes selections from Bernstein's score as source music played on a record player to underscore the protagonist Sammy Fabelman's 8 mm short film Gunsmog (a rip-off of The Man Who Shot Liberty Valance (1962)) as it is screened for his peers and Boy Scout troop at an assembly.

=== Remake ===
The Magnificent Seven, a remake of the film with the same title, was released in 2016, directed by Antoine Fuqua and starring Denzel Washington, Chris Pratt, Ethan Hawke, Vincent D'Onofrio, Lee Byung-hun, Manuel Garcia-Rulfo, Martin Sensmeier and Peter Sarsgaard.

As of 2023, MGM has begun considering rebooting many of its film franchises, including a TV adaptation of The Magnificent Seven.

== See also ==
- List of American films of 1960
- Samurai 7
- Sholay

== Bibliography ==
Meyers, Richard (2001). Great Martial Arts Movies: From Bruce Lee to Jackie Chan and More. New York City: Citadel Press. pp. 276. ISBN 978-0806520261.
