= Lost Spring =

1967 Japanese film

- DVD cover
- Directed by: Noboru Nakamura
- Written by: Noboru Nakamura; Yumie Hiraiwa
- Based on: Hana no nagare; by Yumie Hiraiwa
- Produced by: Gin'ichi Kishimoto
- Starring: Michiyo Aratama; Mariko Kaga
- Cinematography: Hiroshi Takemura
- Edited by: Keiichi Uraoka
- Music by: Masaru Sato
- Production company: Shochiku
- Distributed by: Shochiku
- Release date: 14 January 1967 (Japan)
- Running time: 96 minutes
- Country: Japan
- Language: Japanese

Lost Spring (Japanese: 惜春, Hepburn: Sekishun) is a 1967 Japanese drama film directed by Noboru Nakamura. It is based on a radio play by Yumie Hiraiwa, who co-wrote the screenplay with Nakamura.

== Cast ==
- Michiyo Aratama as Fujishiro Shindō
- Yoshiko Kayama as Kikuko Shindō
- Mariko Kaga as Momoko Shindō
- Mikijiro Hira as Jōkichi Katsuma
- Mitsuko Mori as Hatsu
- Eijirō Tōno as Soga

== Awards ==
- 1967 Mainichi Film Award for Best Cinematography (Hiroshi Takemura, also for Portrait of Chieko), Best Sound (Toshio Tanaka, also for Portrait of Chieko) and Best Art Direction (Chiyoo Umeda)
