= List of submissions to the 36th Academy Awards for Best Foreign Language Film =

1963 Best Foreign Language Film submissions

Highlights
- Oscar winner: (Italy) 8½
- Submissions: 14
- Debuts: 2

This is a list of submissions to the 36th Academy Awards for Best Foreign Language Film. The Academy Award for Best Foreign Language Film was created in 1956 by the Academy of Motion Picture Arts and Sciences to honour non-English-speaking films produced outside the United States. The award is handed out annually, and is accepted by the winning film's director, although it is considered an award for the submitting country as a whole. Countries are invited by the Academy to submit their best films for competition according to strict rules, with only one film being accepted from each country.

For the 36th Academy Awards, fourteen films were submitted in the category Academy Award for Best Foreign Language Film. Poland and the Soviet Union submitted films to the competition for the first time. Pakistan didn't submit a film again until 2013 with Zinda Bhaag being submitted. The five nominated films came from Greece, Italy, Japan, Poland and Spain.

Italy won for the sixth time with 8½ by Federico Fellini, which also won Best Costume Design – Black-and-White, alongside nominations for Best Director, Best Story and Screenplay – Written Directly for the Screen and Best Art Direction – Black-and-White.

== Submissions ==
Submitting country	Film title used in nomination	Original title	Language(s)	Director(s)	Result
France	Le Feu Follet		French	Louis Malle	Not nominated
Greece	The Red Lanterns	Τα κόκκινα φανάρια	Greek	Vasilis Georgiadis	Nominated
Hong Kong	The Love Eterne	梁山伯与祝英台	Mandarin	Li Han-hsiang	Not nominated
India	Metropolis	মহানগর	Bengali	Satyajit Ray	Not nominated
Italy	8½	Otto e mezzo	Italian	Federico Fellini	Won Academy Award
Japan	Twin Sisters of Kyoto	古都	Japanese	Noboru Nakamura	Nominated
Mexico	The Paper Man	El hombre de papel	Spanish, Italian	Ismael Rodríguez	Not nominated
Netherlands	Like Two Drops of Water	Als twee druppels water	Dutch	Fons Rademakers	Not nominated
Pakistan	The Veil	گھونگھٹ	Urdu	Khurshid Anwar	Not nominated
Poland	Knife in the Water	Nóż w Wodzie	Polish	Roman Polanski	Nominated
Soviet Union	My Name Is Ivan	Ива́ново Де́тство	Russian	Andrei Tarkovsky	Not nominated
Spain	Los Tarantos		Spanish	Francisco Rovira Beleta	Nominated
Sweden	The Silence	Tystnaden	Swedish	Ingmar Bergman	Not nominated
Yugoslavia	Kozara	Козара	Serbo-Croatian	Veljko Bulajić	Not nominated

== Sources ==
- Margaret Herrick Library, Academy of Motion Picture Arts and Sciences
