= Yōko Katsuragi =

Japanese actress (1930–2007)

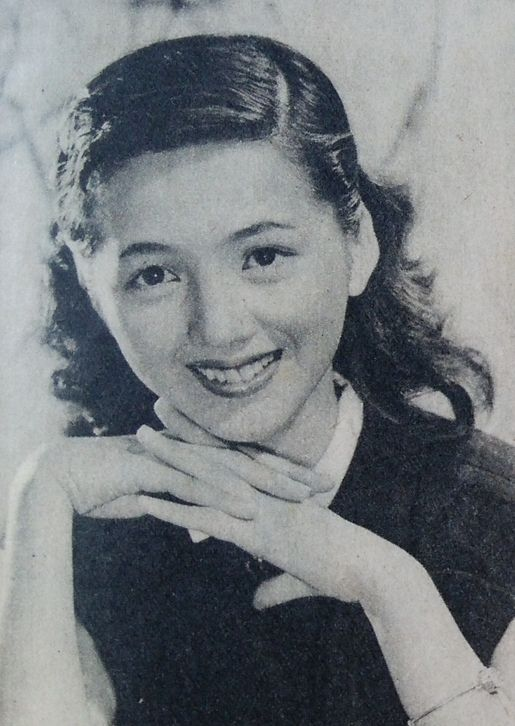
- Yōko Katsuragi in 1952
- Born: Sumie Tomizawa; 20 October 1930; Yotsuya, Tokyo
- Died: March 2007 (aged 76)
- Other name: Sumie Mayuzumi
- Occupation: Actress
- Years active: 1948–1963
- Spouse: Toshiro Mayuzumi (m. 1953–1997)
- Children: 1
- Relatives: Yoshie Taira (daughter-in-law)

Yōko Katsuragi (桂木洋子, Katsuragi, Yōko; 6 April 1930 – March 2007) was a Japanese actress active from 1948 to 1963. She appeared mostly in films of the Shochiku film studios, often under the direction of Keisuke Kinoshita.

== Selected filmography ==
- 1948: The Portrait (肖像 Shōzō) – dir. Keisuke Kinoshita
- 1948: Apostasy (破戒 Hakai) – dir. Keisuke Kinoshita
- 1949: Late Spring (晩春 Banshun) – dir. Yasujirō Ozu
- 1949: Broken Drum (破れ太鼓 Yabure-daiko) – dir. Keisuke Kinoshita
- 1950: Scandal (醜聞 Shubun) – dir. Akira Kurosawa
- 1950: Battle of Roses (薔薇合戦 Bara gassen) – dir. Mikio Naruse
- 1951: The Good Fairy (善魔 Zenma) – dir. Keisuke Kinoshita
- 1951: Fireworks Over the Sea (海の花火 Umi no hanabi) – dir. Keisuke Kinoshita
- 1952: Nami (波) – dir. Noboru Nakamura
- 1953: Adventure of Natsuko (夏子の冒険 Natsuko no boken) – dir. Noboru Nakamura
- 1953: Jinanbō (次男坊) – dir. Yoshitarō Nomura
- 1953: A Japanese Tragedy (日本の悲劇 Nihon no higeki) – dir. Keisuke Kinoshita
- 1954: Shinjitsu ichiro (真実一路) – dir. Yūzō Kawashima
- 1955: The Tattered Wings (遠い雲 Tōi kumo) – dir. Keisuke Kinoshita
- 1956: Fountainhead (泉 Izumi) – dir. Masaki Kobayashi
- 1956: Trouble about a Typhoon (台風騒動記 Taifū sōdōki) – dir. Satsuo Yamamoto
- 1957: Times of Joy and Sorrow (喜びも悲しみも幾歳月 Yorokobi mo kanashami mo ikutoshitsuki) – dir. Keisuke Kinoshita
- 1958: Undutiful Street (親不幸通り Oya fukō dōri) – dir. Yasuzō Masumura
- 1958: Four Seasons of Love (四季の愛欲 Shiki no aiyoku) – dir. Kō Nakahira
- 1959: The Assignation (密会 Mikkai) – dir. Kō Nakahira
- 1960: White Fangs (白い牙 Shiroi kiba) – dir. Heinosuke Gosho
