= List of Japanese submissions for the Academy Award for Best International Feature Film =

Best International Feature Film submissions from Japan

Highlights
- Debut: 1951
- Submissions: 73
- Nominations: 18
- Oscar winners: 5

Japan has submitted films for the Academy Award for Best International Feature Film (Note: The category was previously named the Academy Award for Best Foreign Language Film, but this was changed to the Academy Award for Best International Feature Film in April 2019, after the Academy deemed the word "Foreign" to be outdated.) since the inception of the award in 1951. The award is handed out annually by the United States Academy of Motion Picture Arts and Sciences to a feature-length motion picture produced outside the United States that contains primarily non-English dialogue. Before the award was created, the Board of Governors of the academy voted on a film every year that was considered the best foreign language film released in the United States, and there were no submissions.

As of 2026, Japan has been nominated eighteen times, winning twice for Departures (2008) and Drive My Car (2021). Alongside its three honorary wins, the total of Japanese awarded films is five.

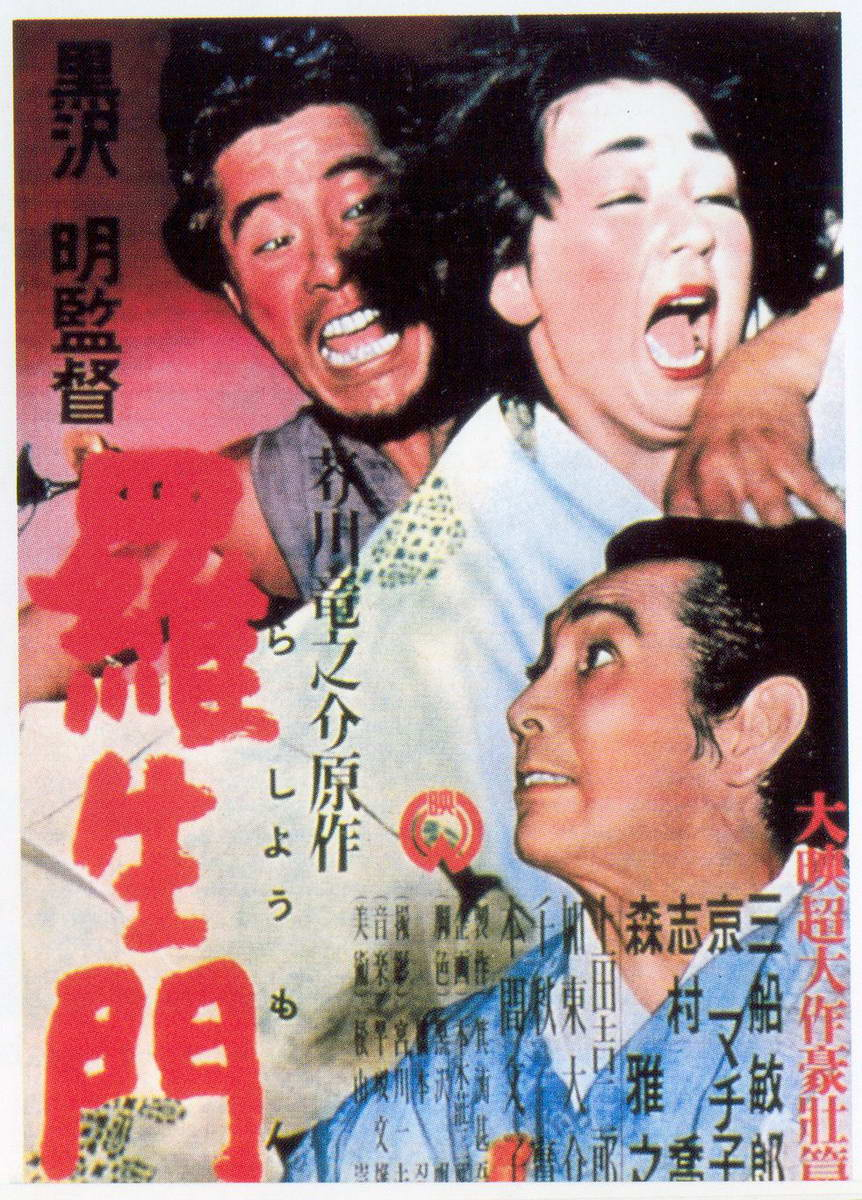
A theatrical poster for Akira Kurosawa's Rashomon, which was voted the best foreign language film released in the United States in 1951, and received an Honorary Award.

Among all the countries that have submitted films for the award, Japan ranks fourth in terms of total nominees, ahead of Sweden (fourteen nominees) and the former Soviet Union (nine nominees).

== Submissions ==
The Academy Award for Best International Feature Film was not created until 1956; however, between 1947 and 1955, the academy presented Honorary Awards to the best foreign language films released in the United States. These awards were not competitive, as there were no nominees but simply a winner every year that was voted on by the Board of Governors of the academy. Three Japanese films were recipients of Honorary Awards during this period. For the 1956 Academy Awards, a competitive Academy Award of Merit, known as the Best Foreign Language Film Award, was created for non-English speaking films, and has been given annually since. Every year, each country is invited by the Academy of Motion Picture Arts and Sciences to submit its best film for the Academy Award for Best International Feature Film. The International Feature Film Award Committee oversees the process and reviews all the submitted films. Following this, they vote via secret ballot to determine the five nominees for the award.

The only Japanese directors to have multiple films be nominated for the award are Akira Kurosawa and Noboru Nakamura. Kurosawa received an Honorary Award prior to the inception of the formal award for Rashomon (1950) and the actual Academy Award for Dersu Uzala (1975), representing the Soviet Union, alongside four other films submitted, with two of them accepted as nominees. Notably, Kurosawa's Ran (1985) was deliberately not submitted by the country due to the poor perception he had among Japanese filmmakers at the time. Nakamura had two films nominated, Twin Sisters of Kyoto (1963) and Portrait of Chieko (1967).

German filmmaker Wim Wenders became the first non-Japanese filmmaker to have a film selected, for the Tokyo-set Perfect Days (2023), a homage to Yasujirō Ozu. The film was nominated, and marked Japan's 18th nomination.

Tetsuya Nakashima's Confessions (2010) and Lee Sang-il's Kokuho (2025) advanced to the December shortlists, but were not nominated.

Most of the films submitted are primary in Japanese, with the exception of All of a Sudden (2026), which is mainly in French. Below is a list of the films that have been submitted by Japan for review by the academy for the award since its inception.

Year (Ceremony)	Film title used in nomination	Original title	Director	Result
1951 (24th)	Rashomon	羅生門	Akira Kurosawa	Won Honorary Award
1954 (27th)	Gate of Hell	地獄門	Teinosuke Kinugasa	Won Honorary Award
1955 (28th)	Samurai, The Legend of Musashi	宮本武蔵	Hiroshi Inagaki	Won Honorary Award
1956 (29th)	Harp of Burma	ビルマの竪琴	Kon Ichikawa	Nominated
1957 (30th)	Aruse	あらくれ	Mikio Naruse	Not nominated
1958 (31st)	The Ballad of Narayama	楢山節考	Keisuke Kinoshita	Not nominated
1959 (32nd)	Fires on the Plain	野火	Kon Ichikawa	Not nominated
1960 (33rd)	Late Autumn	秋日和	Yasujirō Ozu	Not nominated
1961 (34th)	Immortal Love	永遠の人	Keisuke Kinoshita	Nominated
1962 (35th)	Being Two Isn't Easy	私は二歳	Kon Ichikawa	Not nominated
1963 (36th)	Twin Sisters of Kyoto	古都	Noboru Nakamura	Nominated
1964 (37th)	Woman in the Dunes	砂の女	Hiroshi Teshigahara	Nominated
1965 (38th)	Kwaidan	怪談	Masaki Kobayashi	Nominated
1966 (39th)	Lake of Tears	湖の琴	Tomotaka Tasaka	Not nominated
1967 (40th)	Portrait of Chieko	智恵子抄	Noboru Nakamura	Nominated
1968 (41st)	The Sands of Kurobe	黒部の太陽	Kei Kumai	Not nominated
1969 (42nd)	Kuragejima, Legends From a Southern Island	神々の深き欲望	Shōhei Imamura	Not nominated
1970 (43rd)	The Scandalous Adventures of Buraikan	無頼漢	Masahiro Shinoda	Not nominated
1971 (44th)	Dodes'ka-den	どですかでん	Akira Kurosawa	Nominated
1972 (45th)	Under the Flag of the Rising Sun	軍旗はためく下に	Kinji Fukasaku	Not nominated
1973 (46th)	Coup d'Etat	戒厳令	Yoshishige Yoshida	Not nominated
1974 (47th)	The Fossil	化石	Masaki Kobayashi	Not nominated
1975 (48th)	Sandakan No. 8	サンダカン八番娼館 望郷	Kei Kumai	Nominated
1977 (50th)	Mt. Hakkoda	八甲田山	Shiro Moritani	Not nominated
1978 (51st)	Empire of Passion	愛の亡霊	Nagisa Oshima	Not nominated
1979 (52nd)	Gassan	月山	Tetsutaro Murano	Not nominated
1980 (53rd)	Kagemusha (The Shadow Warrior)	影武者	Akira Kurosawa	Nominated
1981 (54th)	Muddy River	泥の河	Kōhei Oguri	Nominated
1982 (55th)	Onimasa	鬼龍院花子の生涯	Hideo Gosha	Not nominated
1983 (56th)	Antarctica	南極物語	Koreyoshi Kurahara	Not nominated
1984 (57th)	MacArthur's Children	瀬戸内少年野球団	Masahiro Shinoda	Not nominated
1985 (58th)	Gray Sunset	花いちもんめ	Shunya Ito	Not nominated
1986 (59th)	Final Take	キネマの天地	Yoji Yamada	Not nominated
1987 (60th)	Zegen	女衒	Shōhei Imamura	Not nominated
1988 (61st)	Hope and Pain	ダウンタウン・ヒーローズ	Yoji Yamada	Not nominated
1989 (62nd)	Rikyu	利休	Hiroshi Teshigahara	Not nominated
1990 (63rd)	The Sting of Death	死の棘	Kōhei Oguri	Not nominated
1991 (64th)	Rhapsody in August	八月の狂詩曲	Akira Kurosawa	Not nominated
1992 (65th)	The Oil-Hell Murder	女殺油地獄	Hideo Gosha	Not nominated
1993 (66th)	Madadayo	まあだだよ	Akira Kurosawa	Not nominated
1994 (67th)	Pom Poko	平成狸合戦ぽんぽこ	Isao Takahata	Not nominated
1995 (68th)	Deep River	深い河	Kei Kumai	Not nominated
1996 (69th)	Gakko II	学校II	Yoji Yamada	Not nominated
1997 (70th)	Princess Mononoke	もののけ姫	Hayao Miyazaki	Not nominated
1998 (71st)	Begging for Love	愛を乞う人	Hideyuki Hirayama	Not nominated
1999 (72nd)	Poppoya	鉄道員	Yasuo Furuhata	Not nominated
2000 (73rd)	After the Rain	雨あがる	Takashi Koizumi	Not nominated
2001 (74th)	Go	GO	Isao Yukisada	Not nominated
2002 (75th)	Out	OUT	Hideyuki Hirayama	Not nominated
2003 (76th)	The Twilight Samurai	たそがれ清兵衛	Yoji Yamada	Nominated
2004 (77th)	Nobody Knows	誰も知らない	Hirokazu Kore-eda	Not nominated
2005: (78th)	Blood and Bones	血と骨	Yoichi Sai	Not nominated
2006 (79th)	Hula Girls	フラガール	Sang-il Lee	Not nominated
2007 (80th)	I Just Didn't Do It	それでもボクはやってない	Masayuki Suo	Not nominated
2008 (81st)	Departures	おくりびと	Yōjirō Takita	Won Academy Award
2009 (82nd)	Nobody to Watch Over Me	誰も守ってくれない	Ryoichi Kimizuka	Not nominated
2010 (83rd)	Confessions	告白	Tetsuya Nakashima	Made shortlist
2011 (84th)	Postcard	一枚のハガキ	Kaneto Shindō	Not nominated
2012 (85th)	Our Homeland	かぞくのくに	Yong-hi Yang	Not nominated
2013 (86th)	The Great Passage	舟を編む	Yuya Ishii	Not nominated
2014 (87th)	The Light Shines Only There	そこのみにて光輝く	Mipo O	Not nominated
2015 (88th)	100 Yen Love	百円の恋	Masaharu Take	Not nominated
2016 (89th)	Nagasaki: Memories of My Son	母と暮せば	Yoji Yamada	Not nominated
2017 (90th)	Her Love Boils Bathwater	湯を沸かすほどの熱い愛	Ryōta Nakano	Not nominated
2018 (91st)	Shoplifters	万引き家族	Hirokazu Kore-eda	Nominated
2019 (92nd)	Weathering with You	天気の子	Makoto Shinkai	Not nominated
2020 (93rd)	True Mothers	朝が来る	Naomi Kawase	Not nominated
2021 (94th)	Drive My Car	ドライブ・マイ・カー	Ryusuke Hamaguchi	Won Academy Award
2022 (95th)	Plan 75		Chie Hayakawa	Not nominated
2023 (96th)	Perfect Days		Wim Wenders	Nominated
2024 (97th)	Cloud	クラウド	Kiyoshi Kurosawa	Not nominated
2025 (98th)	Kokuho	国宝	Lee Sang-il	Made shortlist
2026 (99th)	All of a Sudden	Soudain / 急に具合が悪くなる	Ryusuke Hamaguchi	Pending

== See also ==
- List of Academy Award winners and nominees for Best International Feature Film
- List of Academy Award-winning foreign language films
- Cinema of Japan
