= Nami (film) =

1952 Japanese film

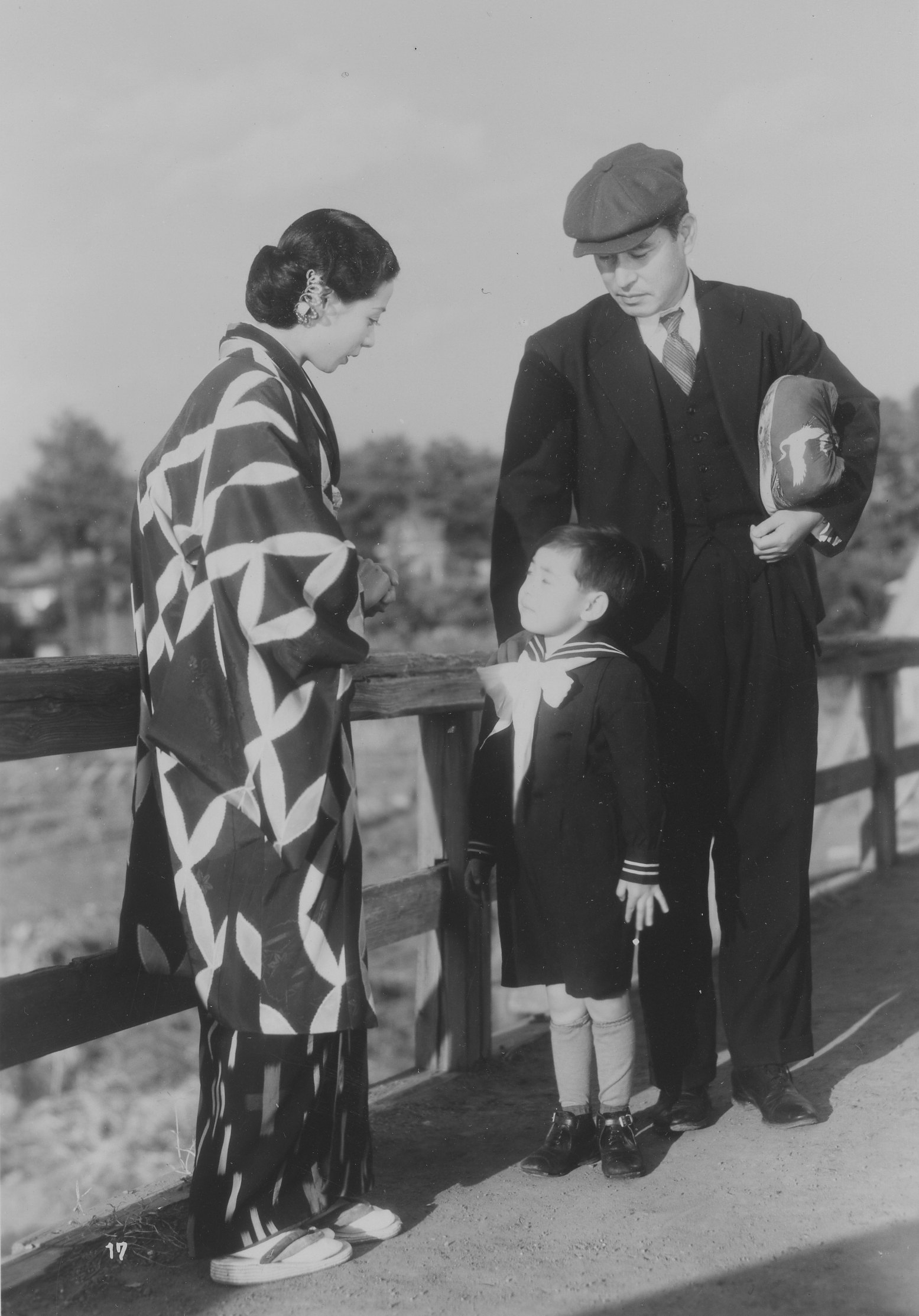
- 波
- Directed by: Noboru Nakamura
- Written by: Noboru Nakamura; Oki Naotaro; Yūzō Yamamoto (novel)
- Starring: Chikage Awashima; Yōko Katsuragi; Chishū Ryū; Shin Saburi
- Cinematography: Toshio Ubukata
- Music by: Toshiro Mayuzumi; Hajime Okumura; Hiroshi Yoshizawa
- Production company: Shochiku
- Distributed by: Shochiku
- Release date: 3 April 1952 (Japan)
- Running time: 108 minutes
- Country: Japan
- Language: Japanese

Nami (波; lit. "Waves") is a 1952 Japanese drama film directed by Noboru Nakamura. It is based on the novel of the same name by Yūzō Yamamoto.

== Cast ==
- Chikage Awashima
- Akira Ishihama
- Hanshiro Iwai
- Yōko Katsuragi
- Chishū Ryū
- Shin Saburi
- Takeshi Sakamoto
- Keiko Tsushima

== Release ==
Nami was screened at the 1952 Cannes Film Festival.
