= Home Sweet Home (1951 film) =

1951 Japanese film

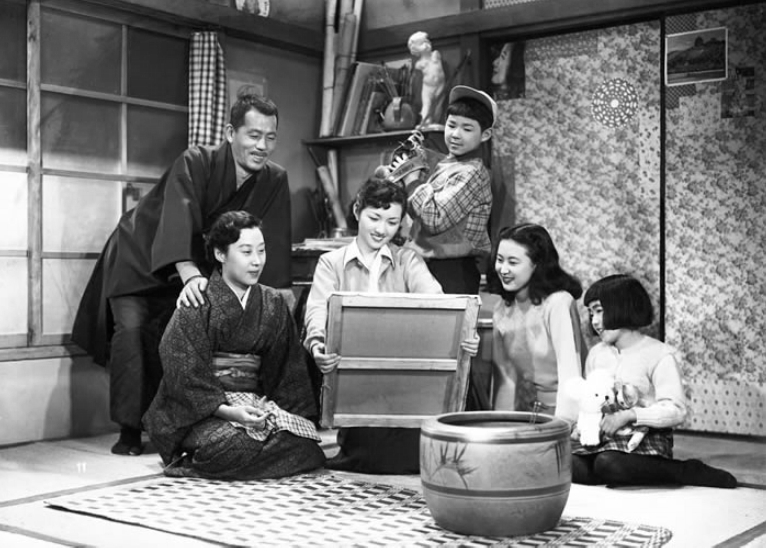
- 我が家は楽し
- Directed by: Noboru Nakamura
- Written by: Takao Yanai; (screenplay); Sumie Tanaka; (screenplay); Sumie Tanaka; (original story)
- Produced by: Takashi Koide
- Starring: Chishū Ryū; Isuzu Yamada; Hideko Takamine; Keiji Sada; Keiko Kishi
- Cinematography: Yūharu Atsuta
- Music by: Toshiro Mayuzumi
- Production company: Shochiku
- Distributed by: Shochiku
- Release date: 21 March 1951 (Japan)
- Running time: 91 minutes
- Country: Japan
- Language: Japanese

Home Sweet Home (Japanese: 我が家は楽し, Hepburn: Wagaya wa tanoshi) is a 1951 Japanese drama film directed by Noboru Nakamura, starring Chishū Ryū, Isuzu Yamada and Hideko Takamine.

== Plot ==
The Uemura family, parents and four children, live in a cramped rented flat and are constantly facing financial difficulties. Still, father Kosaku and mother Namiko try to support their children and help fulfill their dreams wherever they can: Tomoko, the eldest daughter, with her ambition to become a painter, Nobuko, the second daughter, with her singing in a choir. When Tomoko's work is rejected, her boyfriend Saburo dies, and the house the Uemuras live in is sold by the landlord, the family's happiness is at stake, but after one of Tomoko's paintings is sold and another accepted into an exhibition, the harmony is reinstated again.

== Cast ==
- Chishū Ryū as Kosaku Uemura
- Isuzu Yamada as Namiko Uemura
- Hideko Takamine as Tomoko Uemura
- Keiko Kishi as Nobuko Uemura
- Keiji Sada as Saburo Uchida

== Background ==
Nakamura, who had given his directorial debut in 1941, received artistic recognition with this film, which was also the debut of actress Keiko Kishi.

== Awards ==
- 1951 Blue Ribbon Award for Best Supporting Actor (Chishū Ryū), Best Screenplay (Sumie Tanaka) and Best Cinematography (Yūharu Atsuta).

== Legacy ==
To celebrate director Nakamura's 100th birthday, Home Sweet Home was screened together with Doshaburi (1957) and The Shape of Night (1964) at the Tokyo Filmex in 2013, all three in new subtitled prints. It was also screened together with Doshaburi in the Forum section of the 2014 Berlin International Film Festival.
