= Yūzō Yamamoto =

Japanese novelist and playwright (1887–1974)

- 山本 有三
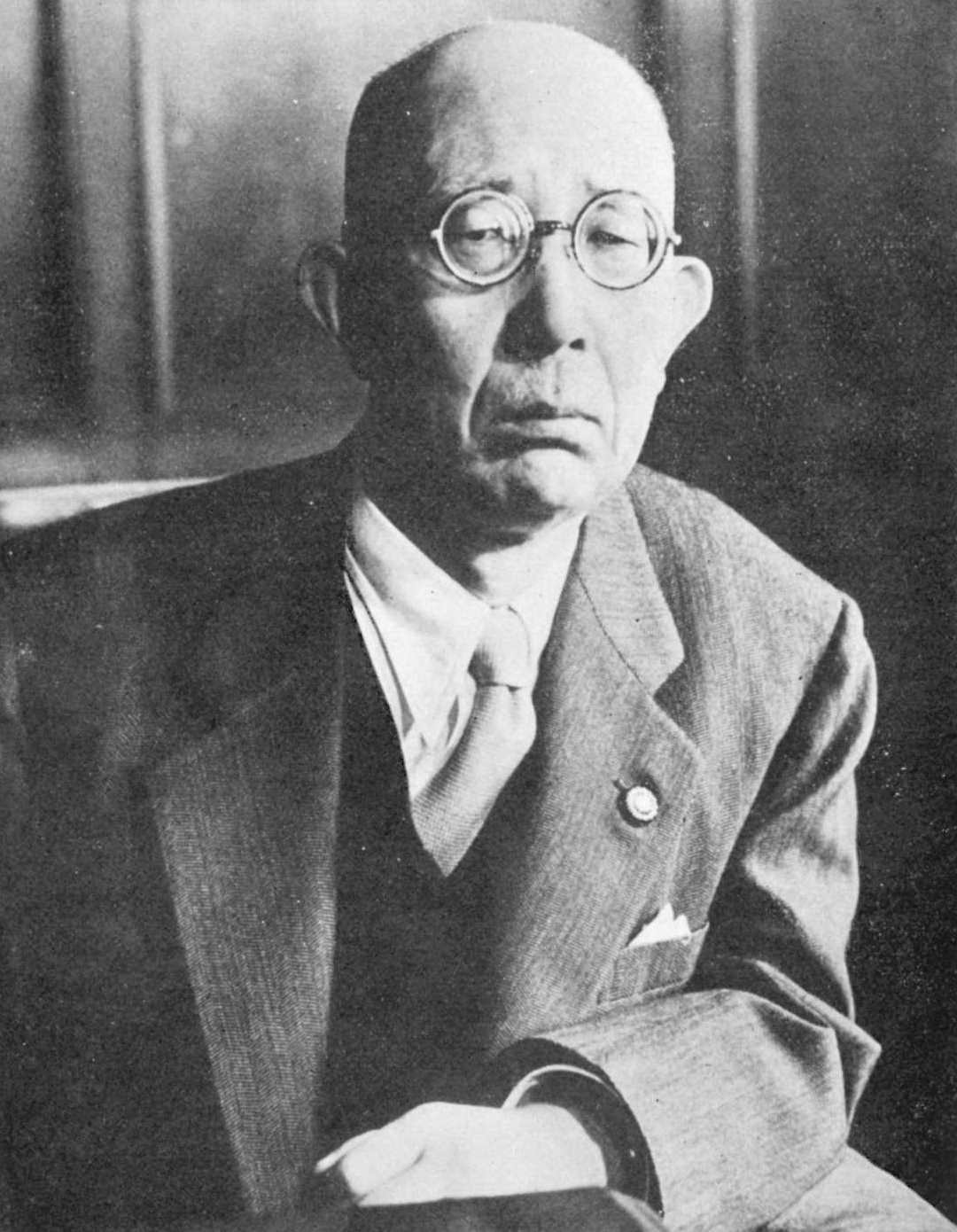
- Yamamoto in 1952

Member of the House of Councillors
- In office 3 May 1947 – 2 May 1953
- Preceded by: Constituency established
- Succeeded by: Multi-member district
- Constituency: National district

Member of the House of Peers
- In office 18 May 1946 – 2 May 1947 Nominated by the Emperor

Personal details
- Born: 27 July 1887 Tochigi City, Tochigi, Japan
- Died: 11 January 1974 (aged 86) Yugawara, Kanagawa, Japan
- Party: Ryokufūkai
- Other political affiliations: Independent (1946–1947)
- Education: Tokyo Imperial University
- Occupation: Novelist and playwright

Yūzō Yamamoto (山本 有三, Yamamoto Yūzō; 27 July 1887 – 11 January 1974) was a Japanese novelist and playwright. His real name was written as "山本 勇造" but pronounced the same as his pen name.

== Biography ==
Yamamoto was born to a family of kimono makers in Tochigi City, Tochigi Prefecture. After finishing high school, he started an apprenticeship and later worked in the family business, before eventually entering the German literature department at Tokyo Imperial University. While still a student, he contributed to the literary magazine Shinshicho. He debuted as a playwright with The Crown of Life (1920) and gained a reputation for his solidly crafted plays, notably Sakazaki, Lord Dewa (1920) and Dōshi no hitobito (lit. "Comrades", 1923). A recurring theme were social injustices, suffered by women in particular, while the contemporary settings of his early plays later gave way to historical ones. In 1926 he turned to novels, known for their clarity of expression and dramatic composition, and also wrote children's books. Together with Kan Kikuchi and Ryūnosuke Akutagawa, he helped establish the Japanese Writers Association (Nihon Bungeika Kyōkai). In addition to his own writings, Yamamoto translated the works of European dramatists into Japanese, including August Strindberg and Arthur Schnitzler.

Yamamoto opposed the use of enigmatic expressions in written Japanese and advocated the limited use of furigana. During World War II, he openly criticized Japan's wartime military government for its censorship policies (which had stopped the serialisation of his novel Robō no ishi, lit. "A stone by the wayside"). On the other hand, Yamamoto was involved in establishing a guide issued by the government which gave instructions on how to write children's stories, and later joined the Patriotic Association for Japanese Literature (1942–1945).

Between 1947 and 1953, Yamamoto served in the National Diet as a member of the House of Councillors. In 1965, he was awarded the prestigious Order of Culture. He died in Yugawara, Kanagawa Prefecture, in 1974, leaving his last serialised work Dakuryū (lit. "Muddy stream") unfinished.

== Legacy ==
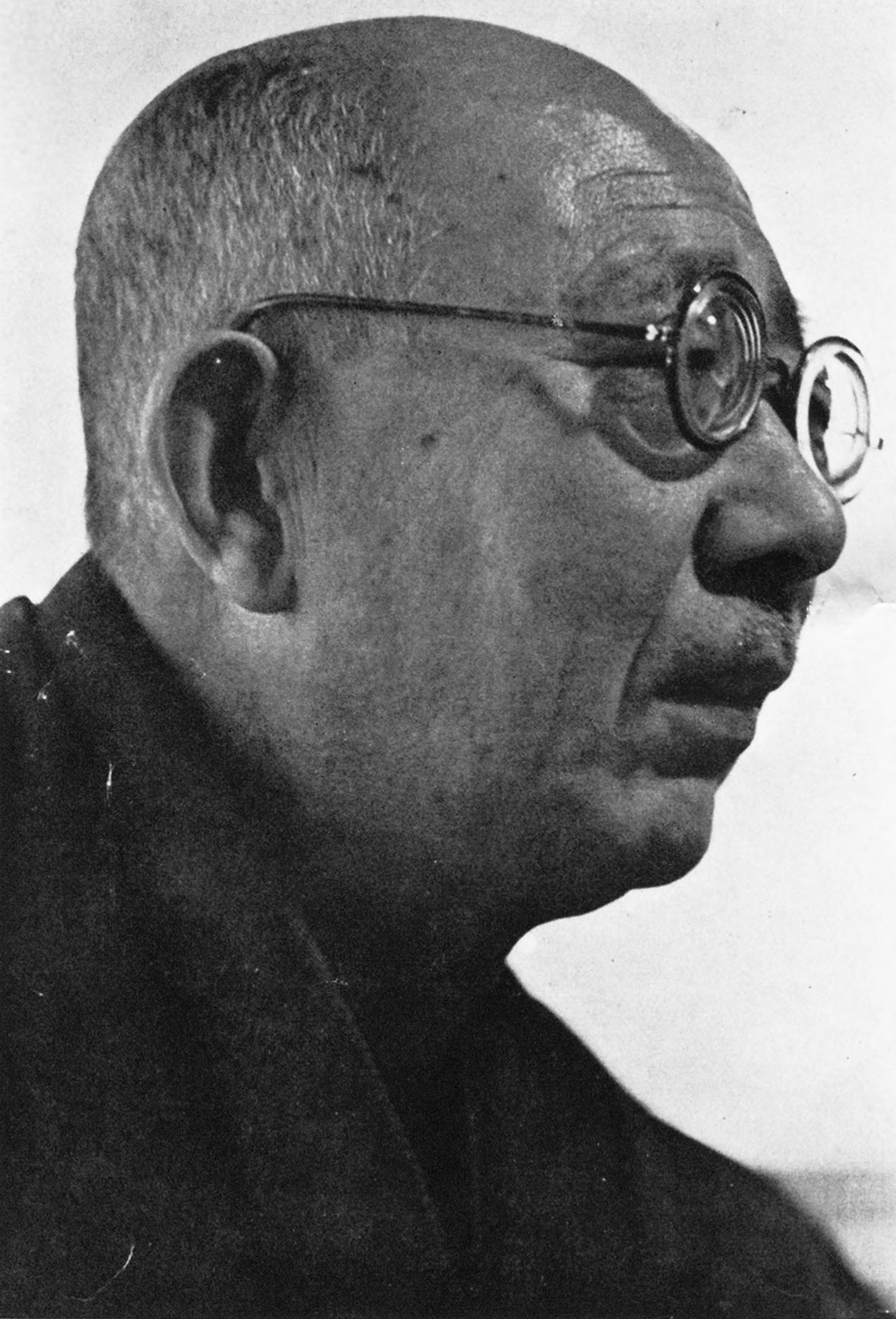
Photo of Yūzō Yamamoto by Tadahiko Hayashi, 1954

Yamamoto's works have been translated into English, French, German and other languages. His play The Sad Tale of a Woman, the Story of Chink Okichi served as the basis for the 1940 play Die Judith von Shimoda by Bertolt Brecht and Hella Wuolijoki. His works have also repeatedly been adapted for film and television.

In 1996, Yamamoto's house in Mitaka, Tokyo, which had been expropriated during the occupation period following World War II, was converted into the Mitaka City Yūzō Yamamoto Memorial Museum. A museum dedicated to his memory was also opened in his hometown Tochigi.

== Works (selected) ==
- 1920: Crown of Life (生命の冠, Inochi no kanmuri) stage play
- 1920: Infanticide (嬰児殺し, Eijigoroshi) stage play
- 1921: Sakazaki, Lord Dewa (坂崎出羽守, Sakazaki Dewa no Kami) stage play
- 1923: Dōshi no hitobito (同志の人々) stage play
- 1926: Nami (波) novel
- 1929: The Sad Tale of a Woman, the Story of Chink Okichi (Nyonin Aishi, Tojin Okichi monogatari) stage play
- 1933: Onna no isshō (女の一生) novel
- 1935: Shinjitsu ichiro (真実一路) novel
- 1937: Robō no ishi (路傍の石) novel
- 1938: Sensō to futari no fujin (戦争と二人の夫人)

== Film and television adaptations (selected) ==
- 1936: Seimei no kanmuri (dir. Tomu Uchida)
- 1937: Shinjitsu ichiro: Chichi no maki/Haha no maki (dir. Tomotaka Tasaka)
- 1938: Robō no ishi (dir. Tomotaka Tasaka)
- 1952: Nami (dir. Noboru Nakamura)
- 1955: Onna no isshō (dir. Noboru Nakamura)
- 1955: Robō no ishi (dir. Kenkichi Hara)
- 1962: Nami (dir. Tadashi Imai)
- 1964: A Pebble by the Wayside a.k.a. Wayside Pebble (Robō no ishi, dir. Miyoji Ieki)
- 1993: Shinjitsu ichiro (dir. Kon Ichikawa)
