= Fireworks over the Sea =

1951 Japanese film

- Film poster

Japanese name
- Kanji: 海の花火
- Directed by: Keisuke Kinoshita
- Written by: Keisuke Kinoshita
- Produced by: Takeshi Ogura
- Starring: Michiyo Kogure; Yōko Katsuragi; Chishū Ryū; Rentarō Mikuni
- Cinematography: Hiroshi Kusuda
- Edited by: Yoshi Sugihara
- Music by: Chuji Kinoshita
- Production company: Shochiku
- Distributed by: Shochiku
- Release date: 25 October 1951 (Japan)
- Running time: 122 minutes
- Country: Japan
- Language: Japanese

Fireworks over the Sea a.k.a. Fireworks by the Ocean (Japanese: 海の花火, Hepburn: Umi no hanabi) is a 1951 Japanese drama film written and directed by Keisuke Kinoshita.

== Plot ==
In Yobuko, Southern Japan, brothers Tarobei and Jinkichi are running a fishing business with two ships of their own. As the catch is too low to cover the expenses, caused by the corrupt ship captains, their business is threatened with bankruptcy when the investors demand their money back. In addition, the fishing association announces to withdraw the boats' license, as the nationwide number of licensed fishing boats is limited.

After firing the corrupt captains, Tarobei and Jinkichi hire Tsuyoshi and his younger brother Wataru to take over the commands on their ships. When a potential investor offers a loan on the condition that Tarobei gives his younger daughter Miwa as a bride to the investor's son, Tarobei gets into a conflict over his vow never to marry any of his daughters off for monetary reasons. Meanwhile, Miwa has fallen in love with Wataru, while Tsuyoshi has developed an affection for Mie, Miwa's older sister, who lost her husband in the war. After the new ship crews have successfully fought off the old ones, and Tarobei has finally been able to convince the association to renew the license (at the cost of his health), the ships can set sails.

== Cast ==
- Michiyo Kogure as Mie Kamiya
- Yōko Katsuragi as Miwa Kamiya
- Teruko Kishi as Sami
- Chishū Ryū as Tarobei Kamiya
- Isuzu Yamada as Kaoru Uozumi
- Chieko Higashiyama as Mitsu
- Takashi Miki as Shōgo
- Keiko Tsushima as Yukiko Nomura
- Rentarō Mikuni as Tsuyoshi Yabuki
- Wataru Sakisaka as Wataru Yabuki
- Haruko Sugimura as Kono Kujirai
- Keiji Sada as Tamihiko Kujirai
- Kōji Mitsui as Moriyama
- Akira Ishihama as Ippei Nagisa
- Toshiko Kobayashi as Midori
- Takeshi Sakamoto as Jinkichi Aikawa
- Yasushi Nagata as Genroku Karasawa
- Seiji Miyaguchi as Gunzō Ishiguro

== Awards ==
- Mainichi Film Concour for Best Actor Chishū Ryū
