= Yoshie Taira =

Japanese actress (born 1954)

Yoshie Taira (平 淑恵, Taira Yoshie) (born October 12, 1954, in Obihiro, Hokkaido) is a Japanese actress. She graduated from St. Margaret's Junior College in Suginami, Tokyo.

From 1985 to 1999, she was a costar in the TBS prime-time television series Ōoka Echizen in the role of Yukie, the wife of Ōoka Tadasuke. She has also appeared in many other jidaigeki, including Gokenin Zankurō, Mito Kōmon, and Abarenbō Shōgun. Stage roles have included Akai Tsuki, Nemuri Hime, Koi Yamabiko, Benkei, Shishi o Kau – Rikyū to Hideyoshi, Zenigata Heiji, Kawaite Sōrō and many others. As a voice actress, she dubbed the mother in Doogie Howser, M.D., Amy Hasting in an episode of The New Perry Mason, and Abigail Bartlet in The West Wing. Taira has also appeared in films, and in television commercials for Yōmeishu and Kao.

She is married to filmmaker Rintaro Mayuzumi (m. 1989), the son of composer Toshiro Mayuzumi and actress Yōko Katsuragi.
