= Twin Sisters of Kyoto =

- Theatrical release poster

Japanese name
- Kanji: 古都
Transcriptions
- Revised Hepburn: Koto
- Directed by: Noboru Nakamura
- Written by: Toshihide Gondo (screenplay); Yasunari Kawabata (novel)
- Produced by: Ryōtarō Kuwata
- Starring: Shima Iwashita; Hiroyuki Nagato; Seiji Miyaguchi
- Cinematography: Tōichirō Narushima
- Edited by: Hisashi Sagara
- Music by: Toru Takemitsu
- Production company: Shochiku
- Distributed by: Shochiku
- Release date: 13 January 1963 (Japan)
- Running time: 106 minutes
- Country: Japan
- Language: Japanese

Twin Sisters of Kyoto (Japanese: 古都, Hepburn: Koto) is a 1963 Japanese drama film directed by Noboru Nakamura, based on the novel The Old Capital (1962) by Nobel Prize laureate Yasunari Kawabata. The film was Japan's submission for the 1964 Academy Award for Best Foreign Language Film.

== Plot ==
20-year-old Chieko is the daughter of Kyoto-based kimono designer Takichiro. She doubts her parents' story that they stole her as a child and raised her as their own, convinced that she is an orphan. In Kitayama, she meets a young labourer woman, Naeko, who looks exactly like her. Chieko learns that they are twin sisters, and that their natural parents died long ago after abandoning Chieko. Hideo, the son of weaver Sosuke, a business associate of Takichiro, mistakes Naeko for Chieko and pleads with her to allow him to design an exclusive obi for her. Chieko clarifies Hideo's mistake and asks him to make obis for both her and her sister. Although Chieko's parents offer to accept Naeko as their second daughter, Naeko returns to her home village after spending one night at her twin sister's home. While Chieko plans to take over her father's business with the help of her future husband Ryusuke, Naeko considers marrying Hideo, even when she knows that for Hideo she is mainly a surrogate for Chieko.

== Cast ==
- Shima Iwashita as Chieko / Naeko
- Hiroyuki Nagato as Hideo Otomo
- Seiji Miyaguchi as Takichiro Sada
- Teruo Yoshida as Ryusuke Mizuki
- Tamotsu Hayakawa as Shinichi Mizuki
- Eijirō Tōno as Sosuke Otomo
- Yoshiko Nakamura as Shige
- Michiyo Tamaki as Masako
- Chieko Naniwa as madam

== Awards and legacy ==
Twin Sisters of Kyoto received the Mainichi Film Concours for Best Supporting Actor (Hiroyuki Nagato) and Best Cinematography (Tōichirō Narushima).

The film was Japan's submission for the 1964 Academy Award for Best Foreign Language Film, which eventually went to Federico Fellini's 8½.

Kawabata's novel was adapted again as Koto by Kon Ichikawa in 1980 and by Yuki Saito in 2016.

== See also ==
- List of submissions to the 36th Academy Awards for Best Foreign Language Film
- List of Japanese submissions for the Academy Award for Best Foreign Language Film
