= Prelude (Mayuzumi) =

1961 string quartet composition

- for String Quartet
- by Toshiro Mayuzumi
- Year: 1961
- Published: 1964
- Publisher: Edition Peters
- Duration: 12 minutes
- Movements: 1
- Scoring: String quartet

Prelude, sometimes also entitled Prelude for String Quartet, is a prelude for string quartet by Japanese composer Toshiro Mayuzumi. It was completed in 1961.

== Background ==
Mayuzumi was one of the first Japanese composers to align themselves with the new European avant-garde, In his work, he combined the styles and form of Western contemporary music with traditional Japanese art music. The Prelude was presumably written in 1961. It was published by Edition Peters in 1964. (Note: Some sources cite 1964 as the date of completion. Edition Peters's published score specifies that it was published and registered in 1964.)

== Structure ==
This single-movement work has a total duration of around 12 minutes and is scored for a typical string quartet, consisting of two violins, viola, and cello. The work features many advanced techniques for strings, such as scordatura or Bartók pizzicato. The general harmonic setting of the piece is meant to resemble that of traditional Japanese music, such as gagaku, with the pizzicato evoking the music of the koto.

Mayuzumi specified that he wanted the performers to be placed as far away from one another as possible on the stage, so every sound could be heard separately by the listener. Since there is no bar separation and no time signature, the extensive use of fermatas is intentionally laid out so that the performers have to choose how long and in which order they should sound for, depending on the order presented in the score and the sounds produced by the other performers. The eerie atmosphere of the piece is attained by using no vibrato and playing sul ponticello.
