= The Snow Flurry =

1959 film by Keisuke Kinoshita

Japanese name
- Kanji: 風花
- Directed by: Keisuke Kinoshita
- Written by: Keisuke Kinoshita
- Produced by: Masaharu Kokaji
- Starring: Keiko Kishi; Ineko Arima; Yoshiko Kuga
- Cinematography: Hiroshi Kusuda
- Edited by: Yoshi Sugihara
- Music by: Chuji Kinoshita
- Production company: Shochiku
- Distributed by: Shochiku
- Release date: 3 January 1959 (Japan)
- Running time: 78 minutes
- Country: Japan
- Language: Japanese

The Snow Flurry (風花, Kazabana) is a 1959 Japanese drama film written and directed by Keisuke Kinoshita.

== Plot ==
Upon witnessing the bridal procession of Sakura, the granddaughter of the Nagura family, Suteo, a young man of about 18, runs to the river banks, followed by his mother, Haruko, who fears for his life. In a series of flashbacks interspersed with the present, the viewer learns of the preceding events, starting during the Pacific War.

Expecting a child with Hideo, the second son of the Naguras, and both knowing that his family of landlords will neither approve of their relationship nor Hideo's reluctance to go to war, Haruko—a tenant farmer's daughter—agrees to commit double suicide with her lover. While Hideo dies, disavowed by his tyrannical father Tsuyochi for refusing to fight for his country, Haruko survives and is taken in by the Naguras to silence the gossip about the affair. Haruko gives birth to a son, whom Tsuyochi, without her consent, registers under the name of Suteo, which means "discarded male." Housed in a separate shack, Haruko and Suteo live as labourers, and the only family member to treat them kindly is Sakura, the daughter of Tsuyochi's first son Katsuyuki and his wife Tatsuko, who also live on the manor.

With the post-war agricultural land reform, the Naguras are forced to sell to the government all but the land they can reasonably farm themselves, losing their status over the former tenants who now acquire it. Tsuyochi devises a plan to regain their wealth by amassing timberland, but this requires an investment from Tatsuko's family, who instead purchases it for themselves, thus deepening the Nagura's resentment at their lost social position.

When Sakura grows older, Tomi prevents her from enrolling at a higher school away from the village like her friends do, instead privately tutoring her in dance and music, intending to marry her into a wealthy family that will help sustain the Naguras. Suteo, now a young man, confesses his love to Sakura, and although she feels the same for him, Sakura decides that the only way to escape her overbearing family is by giving in to an arranged marriage that is conditioned on moving away to her groom's domain. But she also seeks out Suteo one night and they have sex.

Returning to the film's opening scenes, Haruko catches up with her son, afraid that he might try to commit suicide like once she and Hideo did. She promises, now that Suteo has grown up, to leave for Tokyo together and begin a new life on their own.

== Cast ==
- Keiko Kishi as Haruko
- Yoshiko Kuga as Sakura
- Yūsuke Kawazu as Suteo
- Ineko Arima as Sachiko
- Chieko Higashiyama as Tomi, Hideo's mother
- Yasushi Nagata as Tsuyochi, Hideo's father
- Chishū Ryū as Yakichi
- Toshio Hosokawa as Katsuyuki, Sakura's father
- Kuniko Igawa as Tatsuko, Sakura's mother
- Masanao Kawakane as Hideo
- Masako Izumi as Sakura (child)

== Legacy ==
Film historian Donald Richie saw The Snow Flurry, due to its fragmented, nonlinear storytelling manner, as a predecessor of Shochiku's New Wave films.
