= The Judith of Shimoda =

The Judith of Shimoda is a play attributed to Bertolt Brecht. Long believed to be incomplete, a full German playscript of The Judith of Shimoda was reconstructed by Hans Peter Neureuter and published by Suhrkamp (Frankfurt/Main) in 2006. Markus Wessendorf's 2008 translation of this playscript into English received its first stage production in April 2010 at the Kennedy Theatre in Honolulu and was published in 2019 in a collection of Brecht's dramatic fragments.

== Play synopsis ==
The Judith of Shimoda draws on historical events that occurred after Commodore Perry compelled Japan to open to the West in 1854. The first American consul on Japanese soil has threatened to bomb the city of Shimoda if the Japanese refuse to negotiate a trade agreement with the United States. To appease the consul, Japanese authorities decide to ask a geisha, Okichi, to serve him. Brecht’s play primarily focuses on what happens to Okichi after she has agreed to sacrifice herself for the sake of her country. Okichi becomes a heroine of Japanese patriotism who is celebrated in legends and ballads. At the same time, however, the life of the real Okichi is ruined: her marriage breaks up, she is called a “foreign whore,” and she dies impoverished and an alcoholic.

== Adaptation history ==
Even though the cover of the Suhrkamp edition lists "Bertolt Brecht" as the sole author of the play, the actual authorship of The Judith of Shimoda is more complicated. If the palimpsest-like translation and adaptation history of the play were to be taken into account, the full play title might read as follows: “The Judith of Shimoda—Markus Wessendorf’s translation into English (2008) of Hans Peter Neureuter’s German reconstruction (2006) of Bertolt Brecht and Hella Wuolijoki’s adaptation(s) into German and Finnish (1940) of Glenn W. Shaw’s American translation (1935) of Yamamoto Yuzo’s Japanese play Nyonin Aishi, Tojin Okichi Monogatari (1929)."

In fall 1940, during his exile in Finland, Brecht and his host, the playwright Hella Wuolijoki, collaborated on an adaptation of Yamamoto Yuzo’s play The Sad Tale of a Woman, the Story of Chink Okichi (Nyonin Aishi, Tojin Okichi Monogatari) from 1929.

As the centerpiece of Yuzo’s triptych of plays portraying different stages in Japan’s history, Chink Okichi provides the link between Sakazaki, Lord Dewa (1921), on the feudal system of the early Tokugawa period, and The Crown of Life (1920), about a 20th-century shrimp canner desperately trying to fulfill his contract with a London company. Chink Okichi is set in the period right after Japan’s opening to the West in 1854 and focuses on the historical geisha Okichi, who saved her city Shimoda from the American threat of bombardment by agreeing to serve the first U.S. consul on Japanese soil.

An English translation of Yuzo’s Three Plays by the Kobe-based English teacher Glenn W. Shaw was published in 1935.

As an adaptation of Chink Okichi (in Shaw’s translation), The Judith of Shimoda rearranges, transforms and condenses Yuzo’s drama and turns it into a “play within a play” by adding a framework of interludes in which international guests of a Japanese media mogul comment on the political and ideological implications of the Okichi story. Dennis Carroll has commented that "Brecht and Wuolijoki's additions and changes to the Shaw translation have respected the spirit of the original while gestically sharpening its situations."

Brecht’s notes reveal that he initially approached The Judith of Shimoda as a film project.

For decades, only five of the planned 11 scenes of Brecht's version were known, until Hans Peter Neureuter, Professor of New German Literature at the University of Regensburg, discovered a complete Finnish typescript among Wuolijoki’s literary remains and reconstructed a full German playscript by (re-) translating and filling in the missing pieces from that version.

== Performance history ==
Neureuter’s reconstructed script was first performed in Austria, at the Theater in der Josefstadt (Vienna) on September 11, 2008. The first production in Germany opened at the Stadttheater Osnabrück on September 20, 2008.

In 2008, Markus Wessendorf, Professor of Theatre at the University of Hawaiʻi at Mānoa, translated The Judith of Shimoda into English. The first production of this translation opened on April 30, 2010 at the University of Hawaiʻi's Kennedy Theatre under the direction of Paul Mitri. This production was not only presented in conjunction with the 13th Symposium of the International Brecht Society on "Brecht in/and Asia" at the University of Hawaiʻi in May 2010 but also resonated with an earlier attempt to stage Yuzoʻs work in Honolulu: i.e., the first English-language production of Sakazaki, Lord Dewa in Shaw's translation by the Theatre Guild of the University of Hawaiʻi in 1933. Mitri's staging was notable for its use of aerial choreography: "[...] in the second half of the play [...] Okichi begins to climb up various long pieces of red cloth that hang from the upper part of the theater. She uses these in various ways—sometimes to evade pursuers, sometimes as a chair on which to sit, and in the end as a way of hanging herself. This verticality is highly effective dramatically and visually; it is simultaneously yet another estrangement effect, a gesture toward Asian theatrical traditions—particularly Chinese acrobatics—and, paradoxically, a way of dramatizing various events and emotions even further." In February 2011, this production was invited to the Kennedy Center American College Theater Festival (KCACTF Region VIII) at the Los Angeles Theatre Center. The first East Coast production of The Judith of Shimoda was presented from May 3–6, 2012 at New York's La MaMa E.T.C. (directed by Zishan Ugurlu, featuring Eugene Lang College students).
