= Mitsuko Mori =

Japanese actress (1920–2012)

Junior Third Rank Mitsuko Mori
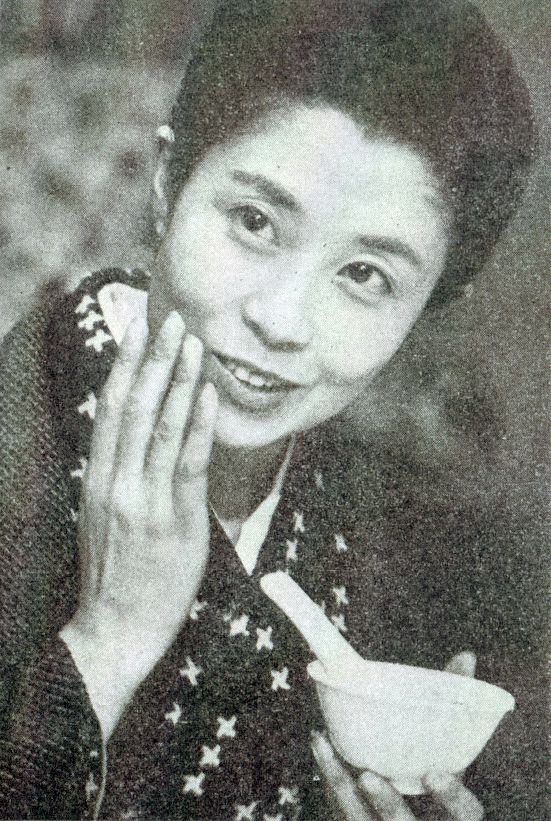
- Mori in 1962
- Born: Mitsu Murakami; May 9, 1920; Kyōto, Japan
- Died: November 10, 2012 (aged 92); Hongō, Tokyo, Japan
- Occupation: Actress
- Years active: 1935–2012
- Spouses: Richard Uemura (m. 1947; sep. 1947) Yoshihiko Okamoto (m. 1959; div. 1963)

Mitsuko Mori (森 光子, Mori Mitsuko; May 9, 1920 – November 10, 2012), real name Mitsu Murakami (村上美津, Murakami Mitsu), was a Japanese actress.

== Background ==
In May 2009, she became the first actor in Japan to have performed the stage play Hōrōki (放浪記, "A Wanderer's Notebook") 2,000 times. She was born in Kyoto, Japan.

On May 11, 2009, Takeo Kawamura announced that Mori would be awarded the People's Honour Award.

Mori died on November 10, 2012, at a hospital in Tokyo, aged 92.

== Filmography ==
=== Film ===
- Lost Spring (1967) – Hatsu
- Scattered Clouds (1967)
- Princess Mononoke (1997) – Hii-sama (voice)
- Sennen no Koi Story of Genji (2001) – Sei Shōnagon

=== Television drama ===
- Onna tachi no Hyakuman goku (1988) – Maeda Matsu
- Nene: Onna Taikōki (2009)

=== Dubbing ===
==== Live-action ====
- Murder, She Wrote – Jessica Fletcher (Angela Lansbury)

==== Animation ====
- Brother Bear – Tanana

== Honours ==
- Medal with Purple Ribbon (1984)
- Order of the Sacred Treasure, 3rd class, Gold Rays with Neck Ribbon (1992)
- Person of Cultural Merit (1998)
- Order of Culture (2005)
- People's Honour Award (2009)
- Junior Third Rank (2012; posthumous)

== Tribute ==
On July 1, 2021, Google celebrated her with a Google Doodle.
