= Immortal Love (film) =

1961 Japanese drama film

- Theatrical release poster
- Kanji: 永遠の人
- Directed by: Keisuke Kinoshita
- Written by: Keisuke Kinoshita
- Produced by: Keisuke Kinoshita; Sennosuke Tsukimori
- Starring: Hideko Takamine; Keiji Sada; Tatsuya Nakadai
- Cinematography: Hiroshi Kusuda
- Edited by: Yoshi Sugihara
- Music by: Chūji Kinoshita
- Production company: Shochiku
- Distributed by: Shochiku
- Release date: September 16, 1961 (Japan)
- Running time: 107 minutes
- Country: Japan
- Language: Japanese

Immortal Love a.k.a. Bitter Spirit (Japanese: 永遠の人, romanized: Eien no Hito, lit. 'The Eternal Person') is a 1961 Japanese drama film written and directed by Keisuke Kinoshita. It was nominated for the Academy Award for Best Foreign Language Film. Masakazu Tamura made his official debut in the film.

== Plot ==
In 1932, Heibei, the son of a wealthy landowner, returns home as a war veteran permanently wounded in the leg. Sadako, the daughter of a tenant farmer on his family's property, was engaged to Takashi, another soldier still in the war who lived in the same village. Heizaemon blackmails Sojiro, Sadako's father, into approving an arranged marriage between his son and Sadako or else they will be evicted.

Heibei, who has hated Takashi since their childhood, knows that Sadako is still in love with Takashi. When she refuses to marry him, Heibei rapes Sadako. Distressed, she runs away and tries to drown herself in a river, but Rikizo, Takashi's brother, saves her.

Takashi returns home from the war, only to learn that Sadako is no longer a virgin and has been engaged. Takashi reunites with her and they arrange to meet outside the village tomorrow before sunrise. When Sadako arrives there, she learns Takashi has broken their engagement. Left with no other choice, Sadako marries Heibei.

In 1944, Sadako and Heibei have three children, two sons Eiichi and Morito and a daughter Naoko. Takashi has married Tomoko and has a son Yutaka, though he is later drafted into another war. Heibei decides to hire Tomoko as assisted help for their household. When asked by Tomoko if she still thinks about Takashi, Sadako declines to answer. While Tomoko serves Heibei, he tries to rape her, in retaliation for Sadako's continued affection towards Takashi.

Tomoko decides to leave the household. Sadako catches with her and Yutaka, in which she states she not only thinks about Takashi, but the life she once had.

In 1949, Eiichi has matured into a teenager, who is pampered by Heibei while scolded by Sadako for his fights at school. He runs away from home, while leaving behind a letter explaining he learned he was conceived through Sadako's rape. Heibei assaults his wife for alienating Eiichi. Meanwhile, Takashi has returned, though Tomoko is presumed dead. Distressed, Sadako reunites with Takashi, and together, they search for Eiichi. However, Eiichi takes his own life when he drowns himself.

By 1960, Sadako and Heibei have sold their farmland. Morito has become a communist student activist. Sadako has consented for her daughter Naoko to marry Yutaka, without telling her husband. An argument ensues when Heibei refuses to have Takashi's son inherit his estate. Morito calls his parents, asking for money. Sadako leaves to catch a bus and meets with Tomoko, who had survived the war, who tells her that Naoko and Yutaka have eloped. When Sadako meets with Morito, he pleas for her to forgive Heibei.

In 1961, Sadako and Heibei have become grandparents. Tomoko has died from cancer. Sadako learns Takaski is dying, and on his death bed, he feels remorse for tormenting Heibei. Remorseful, Sadako returns home and apologizes to her husband. Heibei refuses to forgive her, though he states his abusive behavior were out of envy because he loved her. Regardless, Heibei feels they may never truly reconcile until one of them dies. He orders her to massage his crippled leg, which she agrees.

== Cast ==
- Hideko Takamine as Sadako
- Keiji Sada as Takashi
- Tatsuya Nakadai as Heibei
- Nobuko Otowa as Tomoko, Takashi's wife
- Akira Ishihama as Yutaka, Takashi's son
- Yukiko Fuji as Naoko, Sadako's daughter
- Kiyoshi Nonomura as Rikizo, Takashi's brother
- Yoshi Katō as Sojiro, Sadako's father
- Yasushi Nagata as Heizaemon, Heibei's father
- Torahiko Hamada as Mr. Koshinuma
- Masakazu Tamura as Eiichi, Sadako's son
- Masaya Totsuka as Morito, Sadako's son
- Eijirō Tōno as Policeman

== See also ==
- List of submissions to the 34th Academy Awards for Best Foreign Language Film
- List of Japanese submissions for the Academy Award for Best Foreign Language Film
