= Lucky Dragon No. 5 (film) =

1959 Japanese film

- Film poster
- 第五福竜丸
- Directed by: Kaneto Shindō
- Written by: Kaneto Shindō; Yasutarō Yagi
- Produced by: Hisao Itoya; Kazuo Wakayama; Tengo Yamada; Setsuo Noto
- Starring: Jūkichi Uno; Nobuko Otowa
- Cinematography: Eikichi Uematsu; Dai Takei
- Music by: Hikaru Hayashi
- Production companies: Kindai Eiga Kyōkai; Shinseiki Eiga
- Distributed by: Daiei Film
- Release date: 18 February 1959 (Japan)
- Running time: 107 minutes
- Country: Japan
- Language: Japanese

Lucky Dragon No. 5 (Japanese: 第五福竜丸, Hepburn: Daigo Fukuryū Maru) is a 1959 Japanese drama film directed by Kaneto Shindō. It is based on events involving the fishing boat Daigo Fukuryū Maru and the Castle Bravo thermonuclear bomb test in 1954.

== Plot ==
An aging fishing boat, Dai-go Fukuryū Maru ("Lucky Dragon No. 5") sets out from the port of Yaizu in Shizuoka Prefecture. It travels around the Pacific, line fishing. While the ship is near Bikini Atoll, the ship's navigator sees a flash. All the crew come up to watch. They realize it is an atomic explosion, but take the time to clear their fishing gear. A short time later, grey ash starts to fall on the ship. By the time the ship returns to port, the sailors have been burned brown. They unload the fish, which are then transported away. They visit the local doctor and then go to Tokyo for an examination. It turns out they are all contaminated with radioactivity. Their symptoms become worse, and the contaminated fish causes a panic. The men are taken to hospitals in Tokyo, leaving their families behind. The radio operator, Kuboyama, dies from the radiation.

== Cast ==
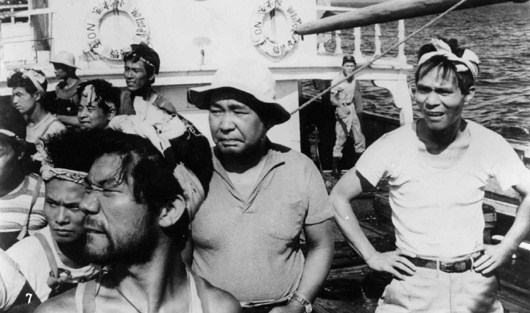
- The film's cast
  Jūkichi Uno as Manakichi Kuboyama
- Nobuko Otowa as Shizu Kuboyama
- Harold Conway
- Masao Mishima
- Kikue Mori
- Yasushi Nagata
- Taketoshi Naitō
- Kei Taguchi
- Eitarō Ozawa as Governor
- Koreya Senda as Dr. Kinoshita
- Ippei Sōda
- Taiji Tonoyama
- Kōji Mitsui (cameo appearance)

== Legacy ==
Lucky Dragon No. 5 was screened at a 2012 retrospective on Shindō and Kōzaburō Yoshimura in London, organised by the British Film Institute and the Japan Foundation.

== See also ==
- List of films about nuclear issues
