= Keiko Tsushima =

Japanese actress (1926–2012)

- 津島 恵子
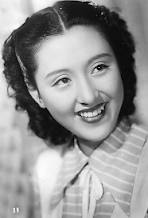
- Keiko Tsushima in the 1949 movie Kanashiki Kuchibue
- Born: 7 February 1926; Nagasaki Prefecture, Japan
- Died: 1 August 2012 (aged 86); Tokyo, Japan
- Occupation: Actress
- Spouse: Ichio Mori (1957–2012)

Keiko Tsushima (津島 恵子, Tsushima Keiko; 7 February 1926 – 1 August 2012) was a Japanese actress, whose real name was Naoko Mori (森 直子, Mori Naoko). She was notable for her prominent role in Akira Kurosawa's 1954 film Seven Samurai. She also starred in Japanese television series such as Sakura and Kimi ga Jinsei no Toki.

Born in Nagasaki Prefecture, she married Ichio Mori, then director of Tokyo Broadcasting System (TBS), in 1957. She died of stomach cancer on 1 August 2012 at a hospital in Chuo, Tokyo, aged 86.

== Filmography ==
=== Film ===
- A Ball at the Anjo House (1947) - Yôko Shinkawa
- Idainaru X (1948) - Chiyo
- Kanashiki Kuchibue (1949)
- Yume o meshimase (1950) - Midori Matsumura
- Kikyô (1950) - Tomoko Moriya
- The Bells of Nagasaki (1950)
- Onna no mizu-kagami (1951) - Kimiko Fujikura
- Tora no kiba (1951)
- Tenshi mo yume o miru (1951)
- Fireworks Over the Sea (1951) - Yukiko Nomura
- Tekirei san'nin musume (1951) - Motoko Matsukawa
- Nami (1952)
- Tonkatsu taishô (1952) - Mayumi Sada
- The Flavor of Green Tea over Rice (1952) - Setsuko Yamauchi
- Mazô (1952)
- Himeyuri no Tô (1953) - Teacher Miyagi
- Sincerity (1953) - Kiyoko Nonomiya
- Hiroba no kodoku (1953) - Fumie
- Seven Samurai (1954) - Shino
- Kunisada Chūji (1954) - Otoyo
- Ai to shi no tanima (1954)
- Kuroi ushio (1954)
- Josei ni kansuru jûni shô (1954) - Minako Tobishima
- Hanran: Ni-ni-roku jiken (1954)
- Banchô sara yashiki: Okiku to Harima (1954)
- Ashizuri misaki (1954)
- Ningen Gyorai Kaiten (1955)
- Hana no yukue (1955) - Kazue Hashimoto
- Tasogare sakaba (1955) - Emy Rosa
- Ukikusa nikki (1955)
- Kyatsu o nigasuna (1956) - Kimiko Fujisaki
- Tengoku wa doko da (1956)
- Onibi (1956)
- Kojinbutu no fufu (1956)
- Nemuri Kyôshirô burai hikae (1956)
- Oshaberi shacho (1957)
- Yama to kawa no aru machi (1957)
- Kono futari ni sachi are (1957)
- Nemuri Kyôshirô burai hikae dainibu (1957)
- Yoshida to Sanpei monogatari: Ohanake no sekai (1957)
- Kuchi kara demakase (1958)
- Kigeki ekimae ryokan (1958)
- Tsuzurikata kyodai (1958) - Natsu
- Suzukake no sanpomichi (1959) - Nobuko Takahata
- Sôtome ke no musume tachi (1962) - Hatsuko Yoshimura
- Nippon dabi katsukyu (1970)
- Futari dake no asa (1971)
- Jinsei gekijô (1973)
- Shiosai (1975) - Wife of a light house keeper
- Kigeki Daiyûkai (1976) - Hiroko Nakatani
- Suri Ranka no ai to wakare (1976)
- Tora-san's Forbidden Love (1984) - Shizuko
- Haru kuru oni (1989)
- Ashita (1995) - Sumiko Kanazawa
- Nagoriyuki (2002) - Kenichiro's mother (final film role)

=== Television ===
- Daichūshingura (1971) - Ume
- Sanga Moyu (1984) - Teru Amo
- Sanada Taiheiki (1985) - Kōdai-in
- Sakura (2002) - Toshiko Matsushita
