= Akira Ishihama =

Japanese actor (1935–2022)

- 石濱 朗
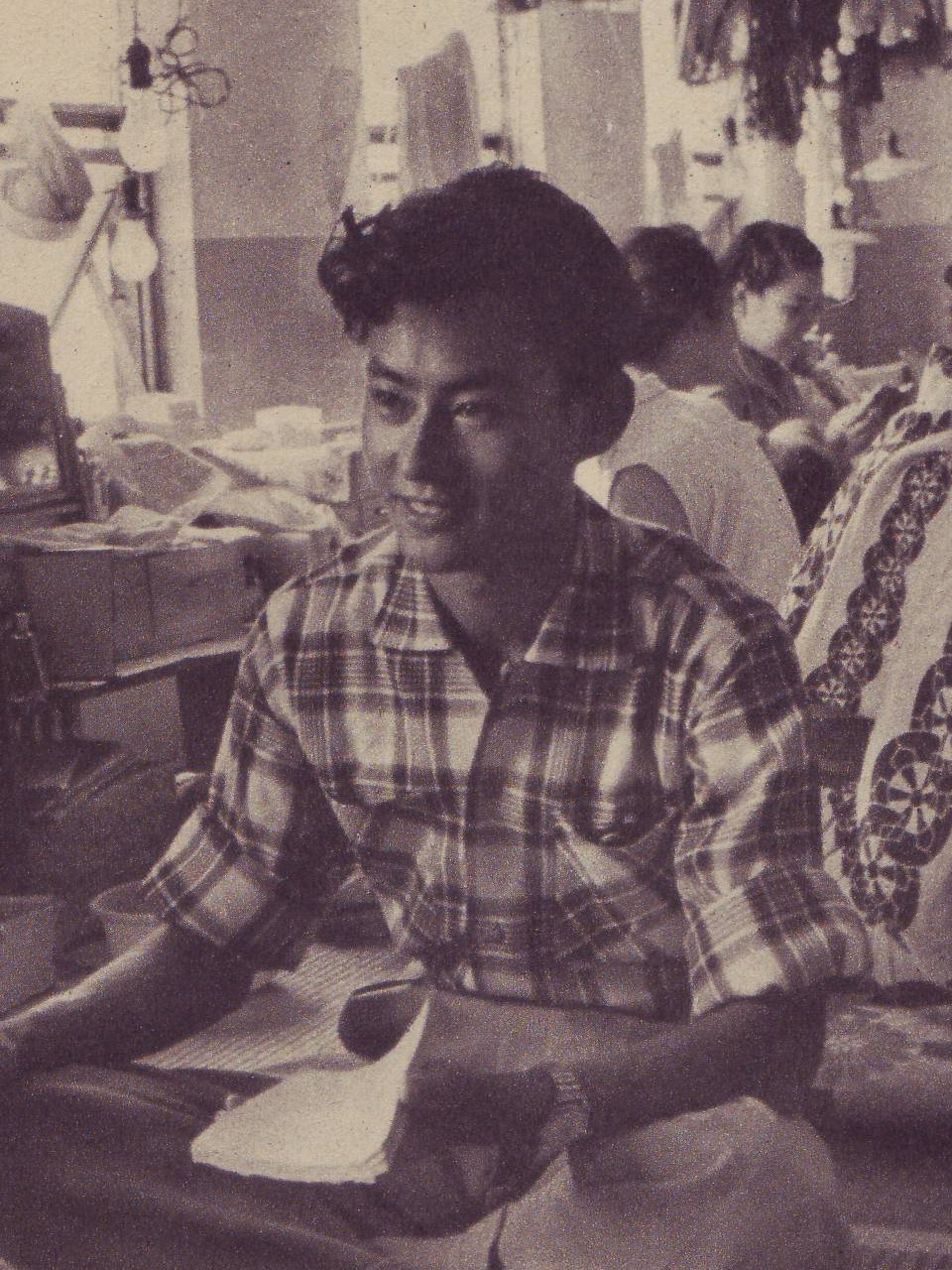
- Ishihama in 1955
- Born: 29 January 1935; Tokyo, Japan
- Died: 26 July 2022 (aged 87); Saitama Prefecture, Japan
- Occupation: Actor
- Children: Miki Ishihama
- Family: Sakunosuke Ishiyama (Uncle)

Akira Ishihama (石濱 朗, Ishihama Akira; 29 January 1935 – 26 July 2022) was a Japanese actor.

== Biography ==
Born in Tokyo, Ishihama made his film debut in 1951, at the age of sixteen, in the drama film Boyhood, whilst still in high school.

He appeared in films directed by Keisuke Kinoshita, Yoshitarō Nomura, and Masaki Kobayashi. He also had an active stage career and played supporting roles in various TV programmes, including NHK's Taiga dramas, jidaigeki (Japanese period dramas), and tokusatsu productions.

Some of his most notable roles include the student Mizuhara who accompanies a troupe of travelling performers on their journey in Yoshitarō Nomura's The Dancing Girl of Izu (1954) and Motome Chijiwa in Masaki Kobayashi's Harakiri—a young rōnin fallen on hard times who is forced to follow through on a threat to commit seppuku. The ritual is made particularly excruciating and humiliating as he is forced to use a bamboo wakizashi, having sold his real blades. Ishihama had previously worked with Kobayashi on No Greater Love (1959), the first film in Kobayashi's epic war trilogy The Human Condition, where he plays Chen, a Chinese assistant to the labour camp supervisor, Kaji (Tatsuya Nakadai).

Ishihama served as president of the Japan Film Actors Association from 2009 to 2011.

His daughter is the actress Miki Ishihama.

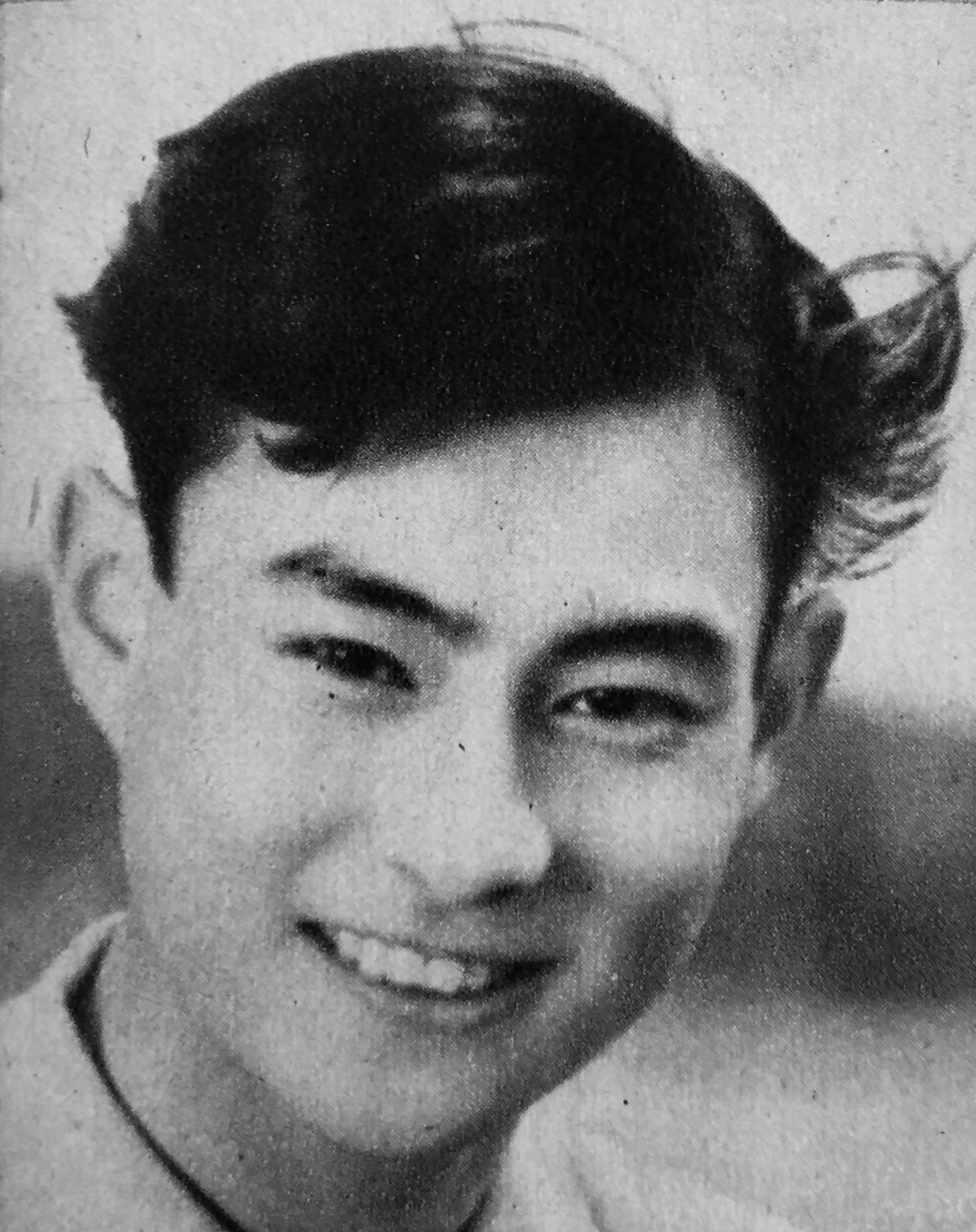
Akira Ishihama in 1954

== Selected Filmography ==
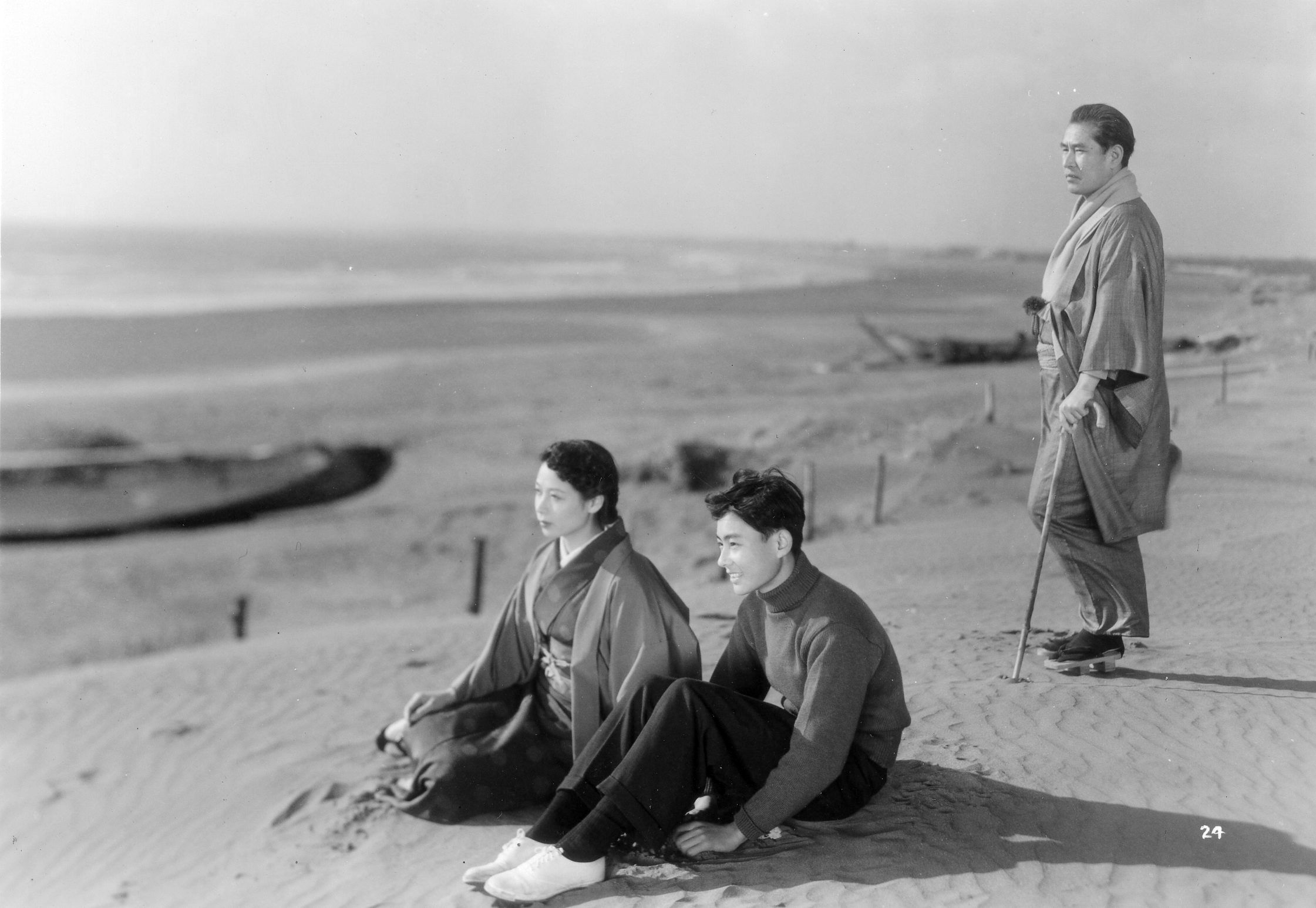
Chikage Awashima, Akira Ishihama and Shin Saburi in Nami (波), directed by Nakamura Noboru, 1952

=== Film ===
Year	Title	Role	Notes	Ref.
1951	Boyhood	Ichirō		
1951	Fireworks over the Sea	Ippei Nagisa		
1952	Nami	Jun		
1954	Autumn Interlude	Hiroshi Sakai		
1954	Somewhere Beneath the Wide Sky	Noboru		
1954	Izu no odoriko	Mizuhara		
1955	The Tattered Wings	Ryôichi		
1955	Christ in Bronze	Kichizaburo		
1957	Elegy of the North	Mikio Fusada		
1959	The Human Condition I: No Greater Love	Chen		
1961	Immortal Love	Yukata		
1962	Harakiri	Chijiiwa Motome		
1964	Daydream	Kurahashi		
1968	The Snow Woman	Yosaku		
1992	Shin Kamen Rider: Prologue	Daimon Kazamatsuri		

=== Television ===
Date	Title	Role	Notes	Ref.
1981	Onna Taikōki	Akechi Mitsuhide	Taiga drama	
1985–1986	Sanada Taiheiki	Ukita Hideie		
1986–1987	Choushinsei Flashman	Dr. Tokimura		
1989–1990	The Mobile Cop Jiban	Seiichi Yanagida		
1991–1992	Super Rescue Solbrain	Eizo Kanzaki		
1997	Mōri Motonari	Fukubara Sadatoshi	Taiga drama	
