= The Battle of Hong Kong (film) =

1942 Hong Kong-Japanese film by Shigeo Tanaka

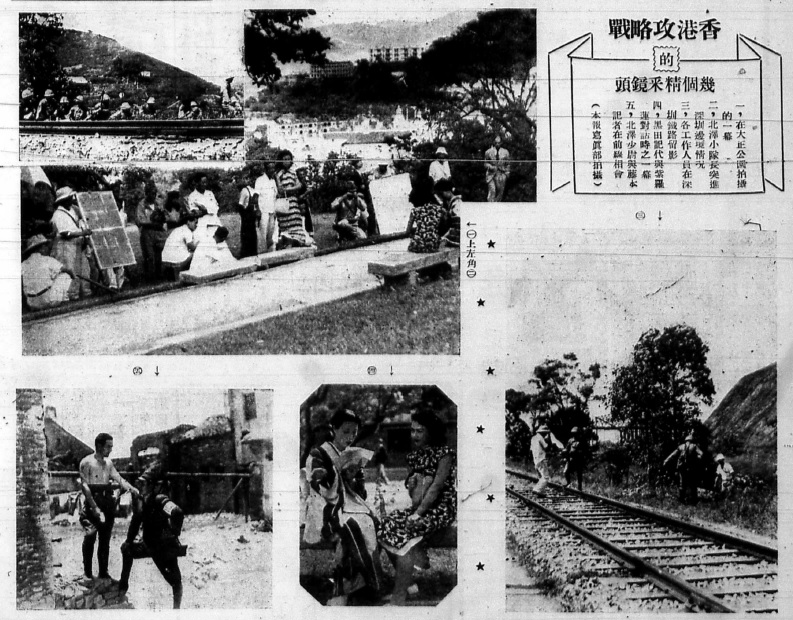
- Japanese: 香港攻略 英国崩るゝの日
- Chinese: 香港攻略戰
- Directed by: Shigeo Tanaka
- Starring: Ichirō Izawa; Kiyo Kuroda; Yasushi Nagata; Jun Usami; Masao Wakahara
- Production company: Dai Nippon Film Company
- Distributed by: Daiei Studios
- Release date: 19 November 1942
- Countries: Hong Kong; Japan
- Language: Japanese

The Battle of Hong Kong (Japanese: 香港攻略 英国崩るゝの日, Hepburn: Honkon kōryaku: Eikoku kuzururu no hi), also known as The Day England Fell, is the sole film made in Hong Kong during the Japanese occupation from 1941 to 1945. The 1942 film was produced by the Japanese Dai Nippon Film Company, was directed by Shigeo Tanaka (田中 重雄, Tanaka Shigeo) and featured an all-Japanese cast, but some Hong Kong film personalities were also involved in its making.

An anti-British propaganda film, The Battle of Hong Kong depicts Britons in Hong Kong as being in a state of "spiritual degeneracy" and inaccurately portrays them as discriminating against Japanese Hong Kongers prior to the outbreak of the Pacific War. This film is now lost.

== Cast ==
- Ichirō Izawa
- Kiyo Kuroda
- Yasushi Nagata
- Jun Usami
- Masao Wakahara

== See also ==
- List of Hong Kong films
