= Toshiro Mayuzumi =

Japanese composer (1929–1997)

- 黛 敏郎
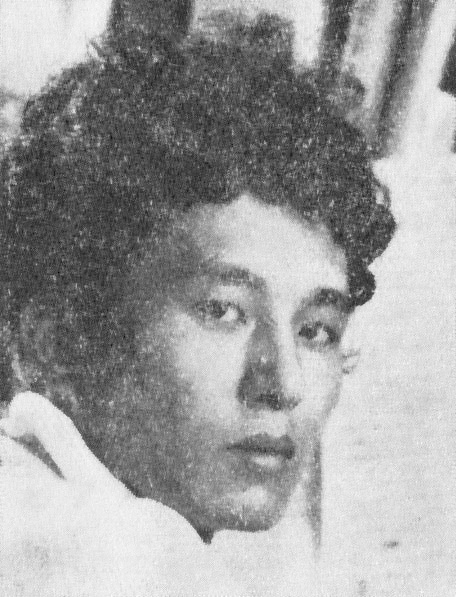
- Born: 20 February 1929; Yokohama, Japan
- Died: 10 April 1997 (aged 68); Kawasaki, Kanagawa
- Education: Tokyo University of the Arts; Conservatoire de Paris
- Spouse: Yōko Katsuragi (m. 1953–1997)
- Children: 1
- Relatives: Yoshie Taira (daughter-in-law)
- Musical career
- Genres: avant-garde; electronic; Musique concrète; contemporary classical; film score; opera
- Occupation: Composer
- Works: See below
- Years active: 1948–1996

Toshiro Mayuzumi (黛 敏郎, Mayuzumi Toshirō; Japanese pronunciation: [majɯꜜzɯmi toɕiɾoː]; 20 February 1929 – 10 April 1997) was a Japanese composer. He was known for his implementation of avant-garde instrumentation alongside traditional Japanese musical techniques. His works drew inspiration from a variety of sources ranging from jazz to Balinese music, and he was considered a pioneer in the realm of musique concrète and electronic music, being the first artist in his country to explore these techniques.

Over the span of his career, he wrote symphonies, ballets, operas, and film scores. Mayuzumi was the first Japanese composer to be nominated for an Academy Award for Best Original Score, for the 1966 film The Bible: In the Beginning.... He was the recipient of an Otaka prize by the NHK Symphony Orchestra and the Purple Medal of Merit. John Huston called him a "modern Beethoven".

== Biography ==
Born in Yokohama, Mayuzumi was a student of Tomojirō Ikenouchi and Akira Ifukube at the Tokyo University of the Arts immediately following the Second World War, graduating in 1951. He then went to Europe where he attended the Paris Conservatoire national supérieur de musique, studying with Aubin and becoming familiar with the new developments of Olivier Messiaen and Pierre Boulez, as well as with the techniques of musique concrète

He was initially enthusiastic about avant-garde Western music, especially that of Varèse, but beginning in 1957 he turned to pan-Asianism.

A prolific composer for the cinema, he composed more than a hundred film scores between Wagaya wa tanoshii (My House Is Fun) in 1951 and Jo no mai in 1984. The best-known film with a score by Mayuzumi is The Bible: In the Beginning... (1966), for which he was nominated for an Academy Award and a Golden Globe Award for Best Original Score. As of 2025, he is one of only two Japanese-born composers to be nominated for a Best Original Score Oscar (the other was Ryuichi Sakamoto for The Last Emperor).

Mayuzumi has received a special award from the Suntory Music Award in July 1997.

He died in Kawasaki, Kanagawa at the age of 68 in April 1997.

== Politics ==
Mayuzumi served as the chairman of the Nihon wo mamoru Kokumin Kaigi (Japanese: 日本を守る国民会議, lit. 'National Conference to Defend [or Protect] Japan'), an ultraconservative organization that supported constitutional revision. He was pivotal in its merger with the Nihon wo mamoru Kai (Japanese: 日本を守る会, lit. 'Society for the Protection of Japan') to form the Nippon Kaigi, and was slated to become the organization's first leader, but passed away shortly before it was inaugurated.

Mayuzumi became the first representative of the Liberal Democratic Party's supporter organization, the Liberal National Congress, in 1977, and continued to serve as its representative until his death 20 years later.

When foreign minister and deputy prime minister Tsutomu Hata stated that "[Japan] must tell [its] children what their forefathers did in Asia before and during the war", Mayuzumi stated in response "It's deplorable that the prime minister of Japan would talk so carelessly. In the past, people have been more indirect about the war".

== Works ==
=== Operas ===
- Kinkakuji (Der Tempelbrand; The Golden Pavilion) (1976, Berlin)
- Kojiki (Days of the Gods) (1996, Linz)

=== Ballet ===
- Bugaku (1962)
- Olympics (1965)
- The Kabuki (1986)
- M (1996)

=== Orchestral works ===
- Rumba Rhapsody (1948)
- Symphonic Mood (1950)
- Bacchanale (1954)
- Ektoplasm (1954)
- Tonepleromas 55 (1955)
- phonology Symphonique (1957)
- Nirvana Symphony for male chorus and orchestra (1958)
- Mandala Symphony (1960)
- Echigojishi (1960)
- Music with Sculpture (1961)
- Textures for wind orchestra (1962)
- Samsara (1962)
- Essay in Sonorities (Mozartiana) (1963)
- Essay for string orchestra (1963)
- Fireworks (1963)
- Ongaku no tanjō [Birth of Music] (1964)
- Concerto for percussion and wind orchestra (1965)
- Concertino for xylophone and orchestra (1965)
- Shu [Incantation] (1967)
- Tateyama (1974)
- ARIA in G for Solo Violin and Orchestra (1978)
- Capriccio for Solo Violin and String Orchestra (1988)
- Mukyūdō [Perpetual Motion] (1989)

=== Ensemble/Instrumental works ===
- Sonata, for violin and piano (1946)
- Twelve Preludes, for piano (1946)
- Hors d'œuvre, for piano (1947)
- Divertimento, for 10 instruments (1948)
- String Quartet (1952)
- Sextet, for flute, clarinet, bass clarinet, horn, trumpet, and piano (1955)
- Pieces, for prepared piano and string quartet (1957)
- Mikrokosmos, for clavioline, guitar, musical saw, vibraphone, xylophone, percussion, and piano (1957)
- Bunraku, for violoncello solo (1960)
- Prelude, for string quartet (1961)
- Metamusic, for saxophone, violin, and piano (1961)
- Shōwa Ten-pyō Raku, for gagaku ensemble (1970)
- Rokudan, for harp (1989)

=== Electronic music ===
- X, Y, Z for musique concrète (1953)
- Boxing for Radio Drama (1954)
- Music for Sine Wave by Proportion of Prime Number (1955)
- Music for Modulated Wave by Proportion of Prime Number (1955)
- Invention for Square Wave and Saw-tooth Wave (1955)
- Variations on Numerical Principle of 7 (1956; with Makoto Moroi)
- Aoi no ue (1957)
- Campanology for multi-piano (1959)
- Olympic Campanology (1964)
- Mandala for solo voice and electronic sounds (1969)

=== Film scores ===
- Home Sweet Home (1951)
- The Woman in the Rumor (噂の女 Uwasa no onna) (1954)
- Street of Shame (1956)
- The Balloon (1956)
- The Unbalanced Wheel (気違い部落 Kichigai buraku) (1957)
- Enjō (1958)
- Stolen Desire (1958)
- Good Morning (1959)
- When a Woman Ascends the Stairs (1960)
- The Warped Ones (1960)
- The Big Wave (1961)
- Foundry Town (1962)
- Black Sun (1964)
- Tokyo Olympiad (1965)
- The Pornographers (1966)
- The Bible: In the Beginning... (1966)
- Reflections in a Golden Eye (1967)
- Thirst for Love (1967)
- Profound Desires of the Gods (1968)
- Jo no Mai (1984)

== See also ==
- List of members of Nippon Kaigi
- Masao Ohba
