= Yasushi Nagata =

Japanese actor (1907–1972)

- Nagata's onscreen credit in the trailer for Kinoshita's The Snow Flurry
- Born: 11 October 1907; Shimabara, Nagasaki, Japan
- Died: 12 September 1972 (aged 64)
- Occupation: Actor
- Years active: 1930–1972

Yasushi Nagata (永田靖, Nagata Yasushi; 11 October 1907 – 12 September 1972) was a Japanese stage, film, and television actor.

== Career ==
Nagata is best known for playing gruff, domineering fathers in films like Kinoshita's The Snow Flurry and Immortal Love. In the 1950s he led a campaign to establish a monument in honor of nine members of the Sakura Corps acting company who died while performing in Hiroshima at the time of the bombing, when Nagata and other troupe members had been away for military service or other reasons. The monument was dedicated in 1959.

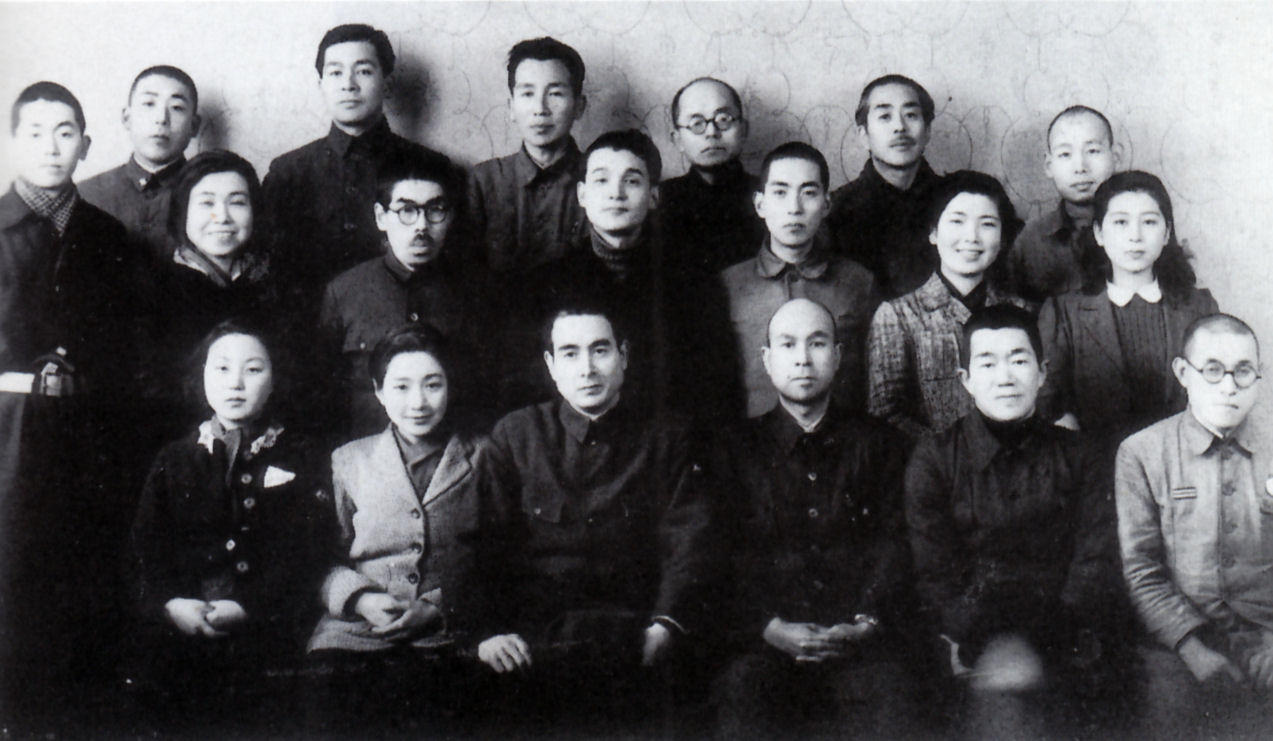
Nagata (front row, center left) in a January 1945 photo of the Sakura Corps that includes several members who died later that year at Hiroshima.

== Partial filmography ==
- The Battle of Hong Kong (1942)
- A Shadow Standing on Mt. Fuji (1942)
- Stray Dog (1949)
- Black River (1957)
- The Human Condition (1959)
- The Snow Flurry (1959)
- Lucky Dragon No. 5 (1959)
- Drifting Detective: Black Wind in the Harbor (1961)
- Immortal Love (1961)
- Sword of the Beast (1965)
- The Long Darkness (1972)
