= Doshaburi (film) =

1957 Japanese film

- Japanese movie poster
- 土砂降り
- Directed by: Noboru Nakamura
- Screenplay by: Toshio Shiina; Noboru Nakamura
- Based on: Doshaburi by Hideji Hōjō
- Produced by: Ryotarō Kuwata
- Starring: Keiji Sada; Mariko Okada
- Cinematography: Hiroyuki Nagaoka
- Edited by: Yoshiyasu Hamamura
- Music by: Toru Takemitsu
- Production company: Shochiku
- Distributed by: Shochiku
- Release date: 11 June 1957 (Japan)
- Running time: 105 minutes
- Country: Japan
- Language: Japanese

Doshaburi (Japanese: 土砂降り, Hepburn: Doshaburi), known in English as When It Rains, It Pours or Cloudburst, is a 1957 Japanese drama film directed by Noboru Nakamura. It is based on the play of the same name by Hideji Hōjō.

== Cast ==
- Keiji Sada as Kazuo Sudo
- Mariko Okada as Matsuko
- Miyuki Kuwano as Umeyo
- Sadako Sawamura as Tane
- Sō Yamamura as Kazuyoshi Okubo

== Legacy ==
Doshaburi was screened in the Forum section of the 2014 Berlin International Film Festival and at the Museum of Modern Art as part of its 2022 retrospective on films by the Shochiku studio.
