= Portrait of Chieko =

1967 Japanese film

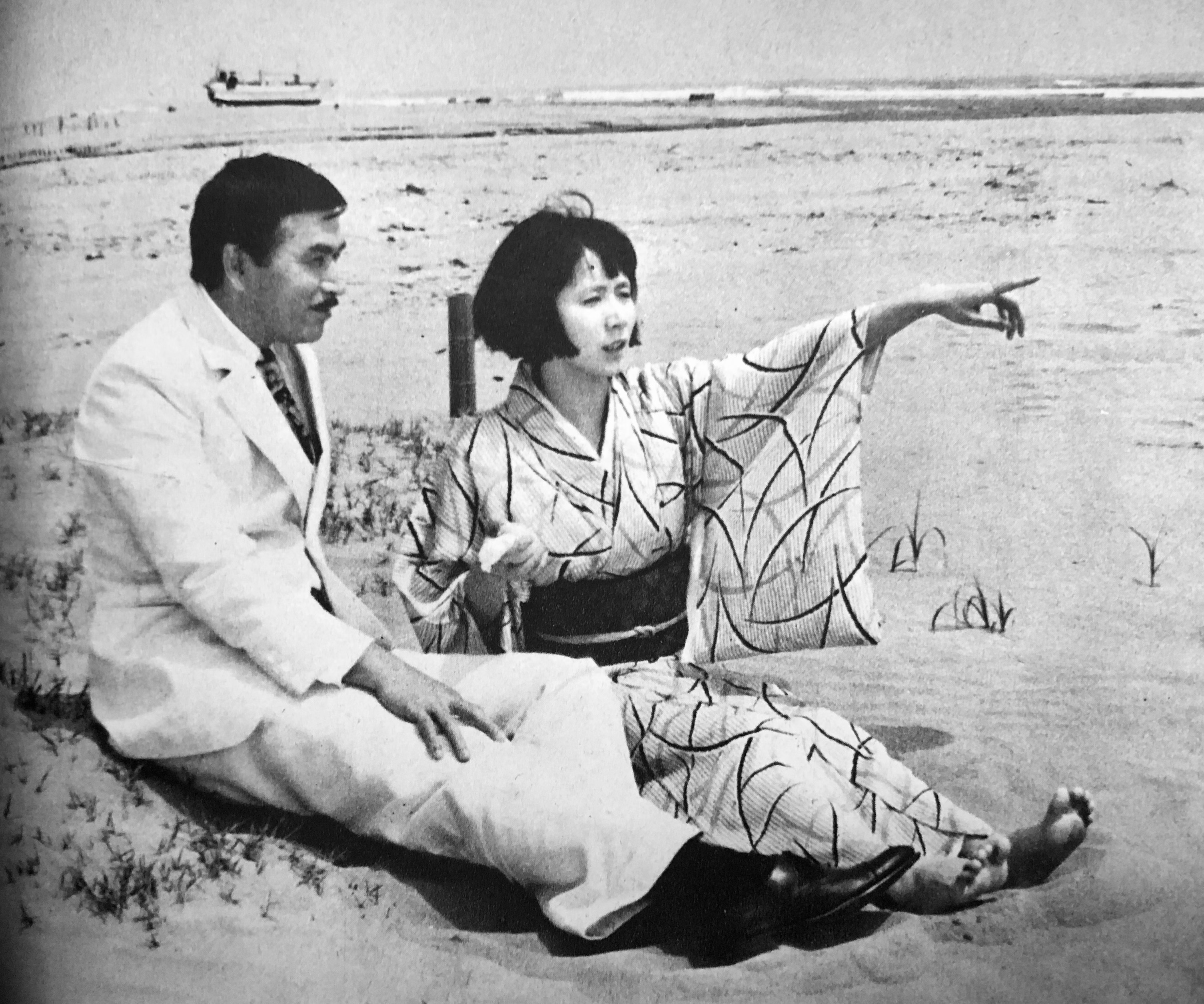
- From the film "Chieko Sho" (1967). Tamba Tetsuro and Iwashita Shima.
- Directed by: Noboru Nakamura
- Screenplay by: Noboru Nakamura; Joe Hirose
- Based on: Chieko-shō by Kōtarō Takamura; Shōsetsu Chieko-shō by Haruo Satō
- Produced by: Masao Shirai
- Starring: Shima Iwashita; Tetsurō Tanba
- Cinematography: Hiroshi Takemura
- Edited by: Keiichi Uraoka
- Music by: Masaru Satō
- Production company: Shochiku
- Distributed by: Shochiku
- Release date: 5 June 1967 (Japan)
- Running time: 125 minutes
- Country: Japan
- Language: Japanese

Portrait of Chieko (Japanese: 智恵子抄, Hepburn: Chieko-shō) is a 1967 Japanese drama film directed by Noboru Nakamura. It is based both on the 1941 poetry collection Chieko-shō by Japanese poet and sculptor Kōtarō Takamura, dedicated to his wife Chieko (1886–1938), and on the 1957 novel Shōsetsu Chieko-shō by Haruo Satō. The film was nominated for the Academy Award for Best International Feature Film.

== Plot ==
In 1909, during the war, Kotaro Takamura joins the "Bread Club" and lives extravagantly. Through mutual friends, the Tsubaki couple, he meets Chieko Naganuma, an art student, and they quickly become close. After a year, they marry. Kotaro focuses on poetry while Chieko pursues oil painting. In 1915, Chieko's painting is rejected from the Bunte Exhibition, leading to disappointment. They visit Chieko's hometown, Nihonmatsu, where her parents welcome them warmly. After a fire takes Chieko's father's life, she abandons painting for weaving. In 1931, her niece Fumiko moves in after becoming a nurse. When Chieko's family goes bankrupt, she hides it from Kotaro, suffering alone until attempting suicide. Saved by Fumiko, she endures mental illness, only recognizing Kotaro. Despite treatment in Nihonmatsu and Kujukuri-hama, her condition worsens. Admitted to a psychiatric clinic in Shinagawa in 1938, she creates impressive artwork. She dies from pneumonia in 1938, holding Kotaro's hand.

== Cast ==
- Shima Iwashita as Chieko Takamura
- Tetsurō Tanba as Kōtarō Takamura
- Jin Nakayama as Toyochika Takamura
- Yōko Minamida as Kazuko Tsubaki
- Eiji Okada as Tsubaki
- Mikijirō Hira as Ishii
- Kaori Shima as Fumiko
- Takamaru Sasaki as Takamura Kōun
- Tetsuo Ishidate as Tarō
- Kinuko Obata as Osato Sawada
- Yoshi Katō as Sōkichi Naganuma
- Poems read by Hiroshi Akutagawa

== Reception ==
In a contemporary review, "Whit." of Variety described Portrait of Chieko as an "Exquisitely beautiful Japanese film", noting that Shima Iwashita "delivers a finely restrained performance of Oscar proportions, catching every nuance of character with consummate acting skill". The review went on to praise the cinematography by Hiroshi Takemura, Tatsuo Homada's art direction and Masaru Satō's score.

== Other adaptations ==
Takamura's poems had already been adapted for film in 1957. The film, also titled Chieko-shō, had been directed by Hisatora Kumagai and starred Sō Yamamura and Setsuko Hara.

== See also ==
- List of submissions to the 40th Academy Awards for Best Foreign Language Film
- List of Japanese submissions for the Academy Award for Best Foreign Language Film
