= Noboru Nakamura =

Film director (1913–1981)

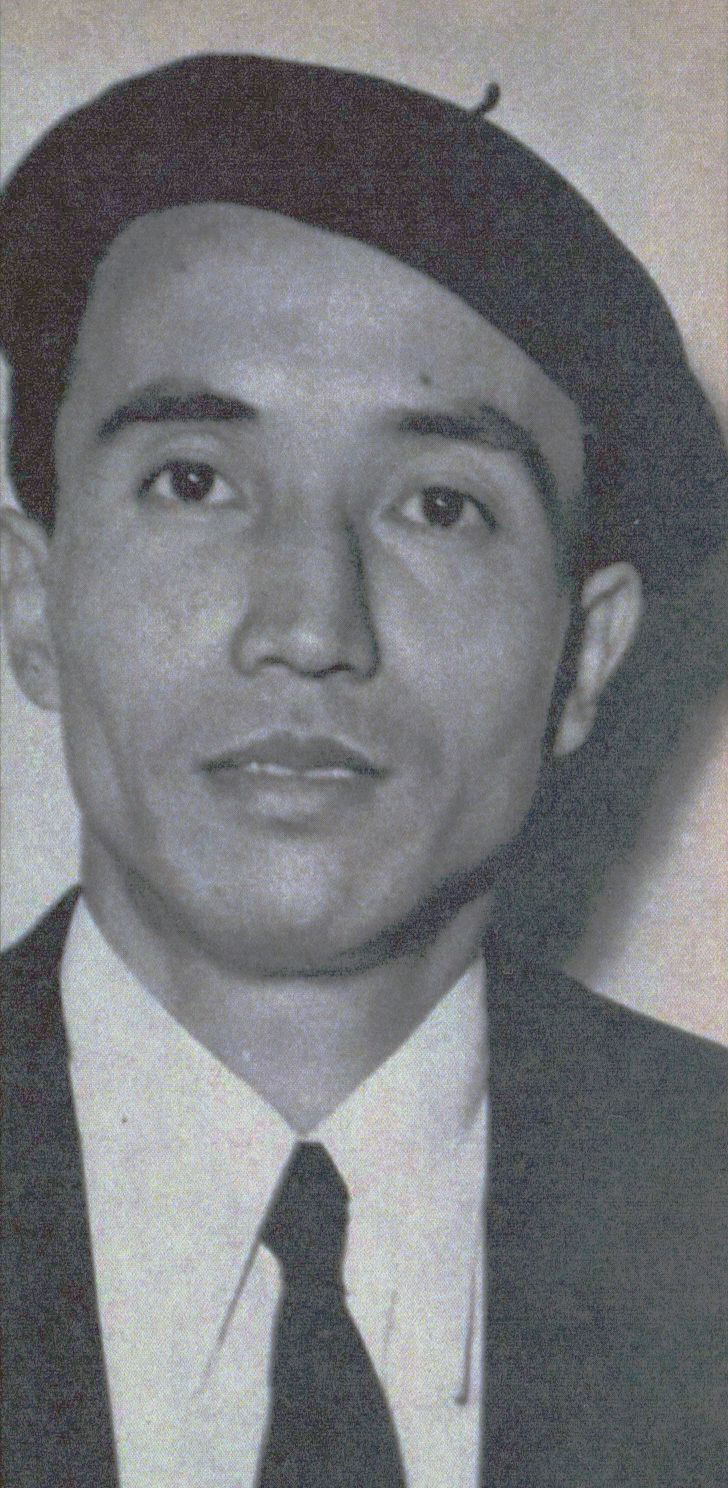
- Born: 4 August 1913; Negishi, Shitaya-ku, Tokyo
- Died: 20 May 1981 (aged 67)
- Occupations: Film director, screenwriter

Noboru Nakamura (中村登, Nakamura Noboru; 4 August 1913 – 20 May 1981) was a Japanese film director and screenwriter.

== Biography ==
After graduating from the Tokyo Imperial University Faculty of Letters in 1936, Nakamura joined the Shochiku film studios, working as an assistant director for Torajirō Saitō and Yasujirō Shimazu. He debuted as director in 1941 with Life and Rhythm, and finally received recognition with his 1951 film Home Sweet Home. His most noted works include the Yasunari Kawabata adaptation Twin Sisters of Kyoto (1963), The Kii River (1966) and Portrait of Chieko (1967). Both Twin Sisters of Kyoto and Portrait of Chieko were nominated for the Academy Award for Best Foreign Language Film Nakamura was posthumously awarded the Order of the Rising Sun, 4th class.

== Filmography (selected) ==
- Life and Rhythm (1941)
- The Ideals of Marriage (1941)
- Otoko no iki (1942)
- Omitsu no endan (1946)
- Home Sweet Home (1951)
- Nami (1952)
- Natsuko no Bōken (1953)
- Shuzenji Monagatari (1955)
- Doshaburi (1957)
- The Country Boss (1958)
- Waiting for Spring (1959)
- Marry a Millionaire (1959)
- I-Ro-Ha-Ni-Ho-He-To (1960)
- Twin Sisters of Kyoto (1963)
- The Shape of Night (1964)
- Niju issai no chichi (1964)
- The Kii River (1966)
- Lost Spring (1967)
- Portrait of Chieko (1967)
- Waga Toso (1968)
- Through Days and Months (1969)
- Waga Ko, Waga Uta (1969)
- The Song from My Heart (1970)
- Kaze no Bojô (1970)
- Shiroi Shojo (1976)
- Shiokari Pass (1977)
- Nichiren (1979)

== Legacy ==
To celebrate Nakamura's 100th birthday, three of his films, Home Sweet Home (1951), Doshaburi (1957) and The Shape of Night (1964), were screened at the Tokyo Filmex in 2013. The Shape of Night was also shown at the Venice Film Festival the same year. Home Sweet Home and Doshaburi were screened in the Forum section of the 2014 Berlin International Film Festival.
