= 2025 in Japanese television =

Below is a non-comprehensive list of events associated with and affecting Japanese television in 2025.

== Events ==
Date	Event	Source
January 2	One Piece voice actor Hiroshi Kamiya announced marriage with Engine Sentai Go-onger actress Rina Aizawa.	
January 26	Ahead of the premiere of No.1 Sentai Gozyuger, a Super Sentai 50th anniversary press conference was held.	
January 27	Following the resignations President Koichi Minato and Chairman Shuji Kanoh on the same day, after a scandal centering on former SMAP member and presenter Masahiro Nakai in December 2024, Dragon Ball Z anime producer Kenji Shimizu becomes the new Fuji TV president.	
January 28	Shinji Aoba's death sentence has been confirmed after his appeal to the Kyoto District Court's ruling is dropped.	
February 2	Following the Fuji TV scandal, all anime shows broadcasting on Fuji TV, including Chibi Maruko-chan and Sazae-san, begin airing new episodes without sponsors, starting from this date until July 2025. Some of the Fuji TV anime shows later retain sponsorships with other companies involved in the franchises, such as Bandai, later on February 16.	
March 20	During the Digimon Con 2025 livestream event, a new Digimon TV anime series has been announced, slating to premiere in October 2025.	
April 4	As announced on March 3, Fuji TV's late night anime programming block, Noitamina, moves its broadcast to Friday nights at 11:30 p.m., starting with The Dinner Table Detective.	
April 6	The 2025 Formula One World Championship was held at 2025 Japanese Grand Prix.	
April 6	Following its hiatus after October 13, 2024, the One Piece anime series resumes broadcasting new episodes on Sunday evenings at 11:15 p.m. on Fuji TV.	
May 17-18	The 2024–25 Formula E World Championship was held at 2025 Tokyo ePrix.	
June 25	Rock band Tokio, known for the performing the opening theme for the 1995-96 TV anime Soar High! Isami, announced their disbandment.	
August 15	K-On! voice actress Aki Toyosaki limits her entertainment activities due to the death of her husband.	
September 28	The 2025 MotoGP World Championship was held at 2025 Japanese motorcycle Grand Prix.	
October 4	Animeism, late night anime programming block airing on all JNN affiliate stations such as TBS, reduces its running time to 2 programs, starting from this date.	
November 7	The Idolmaster SideM voice actor Fumiyoshi Shioya limits some of his activities due to what was happening online.	
November 23	Toei Company announces Project R.E.D. which is set to air in early 2026 on the Sunday 9:30 AM timeslot that was occupied by the Super Sentai franchise from October 2017 until early 2026, starting with Super Space Sheriff Gavan Infinity. A few days later, it was confirmed that the Super Sentai franchise will be on a hiatus, starting from February 8, 2026.	
December 11	Anime studio Gainax, known for producing TV anime such as Neon Genesis Evangelion, Panty & Stocking with Garterbelt and Wish Upon the Pleiades, shuts down.	

== Ongoing ==
Show	Type	Channel	First aired/Japanese period		Source
NHK
NHK Amateur Song Contest	Talent show	NHK-G, NHK World Premium	March 15, 1953 (TV)	Showa	
With Mother	Kids	E-TV, NHK World Premium	October 5, 1959	Showa	
Nintama Rantarō	Anime	NHK	April 10, 1993	Heisei	
Ojarumaru	Anime	NHK	October 5, 1998	Heisei	
Utacon	Music	NHK-G, NHK World Premium	April 12, 2016	Heisei	
Nippon Television Network System
Shōten	Comedy	Nippon Television	May 15, 1966	Showa	
Soreike! Anpanman	Anime	Nippon Television	October 3, 1988	Showa	
Downtown no Gaki no Tsukai ya Arahende!!	Game show	Nippon Television	October 3, 1989	Heisei	
Detective Conan	Anime	NNS	January 8, 1996	Heisei	
Fuji Network System
Music Fair	Music	Fuji TV	August 31, 1964	Showa	
Sazae-san	Anime	Fuji TV	October 5, 1969	Showa	
FNS Music Festival	Music	FNS	July 2, 1974	Showa	
Chibi Maruko-chan	Anime	Fuji TV	January 8, 1995	Heisei	
One Piece	Anime	Fuji TV	October 20, 1999	Heisei	
TV Tokyo
Ninjala	Anime	TV Tokyo	January 8, 2022	Reiwa	
Pokémon	Anime	TV Tokyo	April 14, 2023	Reiwa	
Himitsu no AiPri	Anime	TV Tokyo	April 7, 2024	Reiwa	
TV Asahi
Super Hero Time	Tokusatsu	TV Asahi	September 28, 2003	Heisei	
Crayon Shin-chan	Anime	TV Asahi	April 13, 1992	Heisei	
Doraemon	Anime	TV Asahi	April 15, 2005	Heisei	
Music Station	Music	TV Asahi	October 24, 1986	Showa	
TBS
SASUKE	Sports	TBS	September 26, 1997	Heisei	
Count Down TV	Music	TBS	April 7, 1993	Heisei	

== New series and returning shows ==
Show	Network	Premiere	Finale	Status	Source
Medalist	TV Asahi	January 5, 2025	March 30, 2025	Season Ended; Renewed for Season 2	
Unbound	NHK	January 5, 2025	December 14, 2025	Series Ended	
Zenshu	TV Tokyo	January 5, 2025	March 23, 2025	Series Ended	
Alice-san Chi no Iroribata	TBS	January 7, 2025	March 11, 2025	Series Ended	
Magic Maker	TV Tokyo	January 9, 2025	March 27, 2025	Series Ended	
Dr. Stone: Science Future (Part 1)	Tokyo MX	January 9, 2025	March 27, 2025	Season Ended; Renewed for Final Season part 2	
The Apothecary Diaries (Season 2)	Nippon TV	January 10, 2025	July 4, 2025	Season Ended	
Farmagia	Tokyo MX	January 10, 2025	March 28, 2025	Series Ended	
From Bureaucrat to Villainess: Dad's Been Reincarnated!	TBS	January 10, 2025	March 28, 2025	Series Ended	
Welcome to Japan, Ms. Elf!	TBS	January 11, 2025	March 29, 2025	Series Ended	
Toilet-Bound Hanako-kun (Season 2)	TBS	January 12, 2025	September 21, 2025	Series Ended	
Witchy Pretty Cure!! Future Days	TV Asahi	January 12, 2025	March 30, 2025	Series Ended	
Mashin Creator Wataru	TV Tokyo	January 12, 2025	June 22, 2025	Series Ended	
Ultraman New Generation Stars (Season 3)	TV Tokyo	January 25, 2025	June 21, 2015	Season Ended	
You and Idol Pretty Cure	TV Asahi	February 2, 2025	January 25, 2026	Ending 2026	
No.1 Sentai Gozyuger	TV Asahi	February 16, 2025	February 8, 2026	Ending 2026	
Happy Kanako's Killer Life	DMM TV	February 28, 2025	March 28, 2025	Season Ended; Renewed for Season 2	
Anpan	NHK	March 31, 2025	September 26, 2025	Series Ended	
Shiawase wa Tabete Nete Mate	NHK	April 1, 2025	May 27, 2025	Series Ended	
Wind Breaker (Season 2)	TBS	April 4, 2025	June 20, 2025	Series Ended	
The Dinner Table Detective	Fuji TV	April 4, 2025	June 20, 2025	Series Ended	
Fire Force (Season 3, Part 1)	TBS	April 5, 2025	June 21, 2025	Season Ended; Renewed for Season 3, Part 2	
I've Been Killing Slimes for 300 Years and Maxed Out My Level (Season 2)	Tokyo MX	April 5, 2025	June 21, 2025	Series Ended	
Anne Shirley	NHK-E	April 5, 2025	September 27, 2025	Series Ended	
Yaiba: Samurai Legend	Nippon TV	April 5, 2025	September 27, 2025	Season Ended; Renewed for Season 2	
Shoshimin: How to Become Ordinary (Season 2)	TV Asahi	April 6, 2025	June 22, 2025	Series Ended	
Witch Watch	TBS	April 6, 2025	October 5, 2025	Season Ended; Renewed for Season 2	
Himitsu no AiPri (Season 2)	TV Tokyo	April 6, 2025	March 29, 2026	Ending 2026	
Princession Orchestra	TV Tokyo	April 6, 2025	March 29, 2026	Ending 2026	
My Hero Academia: Vigilantes	Tokyo MX	April 7, 2025	June 30, 2025	Season Ended; Renewed for Season 2	
Aharen-san wa Hakarenai (Season 2)	Tokyo MX	April 7, 2025	June 23, 2025	Series Ended	
Mobile Suit Gundam GQuuuuuuX	Nippon TV	April 9, 2025	June 25, 2025	Series Ended	
Go! Go! Loser Ranger! (Season 2)	TBS	April 13, 2025	June 29, 2025	Series Ended	
Dandadan (Season 2)	TBS	July 4, 2025	September 19, 2025	Season Ended; Renewed for Season 3	
Call of the Night (Season 2)	Fuji TV	July 4, 2025	September 19, 2025	Series Ended	
Ultraman Omega	TV Tokyo	July 5, 2025	January 17, 2026	Ending 2026	
Puniru Is a Cute Slime (Season 2)	TV Tokyo	July 6, 2025	September 21, 2025	Series Ended	
Mr. Osomatsu (Season 4)	TV Tokyo	July 8, 2025	October 1, 2025	Series Ended	
New Panty & Stocking with Garterbelt	Tokyo MX	July 10, 2025	September 25, 2025	Series Ended	
Dr. Stone: Science Future (Part 2)	Tokyo MX	July 10, 2025	September 25, 2025	Season Ended; Renewed for Final Season part 3	
Kaiju No. 8 (Season 2)	TV Tokyo	July 19, 2025	September 27, 2025	Series Ended	
Kamen Rider Zeztz	TV Asahi	September 7, 2025	Currently airing	Continues 2026	
The Ghost Writer's Wife	NHK	September 29, 2025	March 27, 2026	Ending 2026	
My Hero Academia (Final Season)	Nippon TV	October 4, 2025	December 13, 2025	Series Ended	
To Your Eternity (Season 3)	NHK	October 4, 2025	March 21, 2026	Ending 2026	
Spy × Family (Season 3)	TV Tokyo	October 4, 2025	December 27, 2025	Season Ended	
Tales of Wedding Rings (Season 2)	Tokyo MX	October 4, 2025	December 27, 2025	Series Ended	
Digimon Beatbreak	Fuji TV	October 5, 2025	Currently airing	Continues 2026	
Ranma ½ (2024 series, Season 2)	Nippon TV	October 5, 2025	December 21, 2025	Season Ended	
Let This Grieving Soul Retire! (Season 2)	Tokyo MX	October 6, 2025	December 15, 2025	Series Ended	
Campfire Cooking in Another World with My Absurd Skill (Season 2)	TV Tokyo	October 7, 2025	December 24, 2025	Series Ended	
The Blue Wolves of Mibu (Season 2)	Nippon TV	December 20, 2025	March 28, 2026	Ending 2026	

== Ending ==
End date	Show	Channel	First aired	Replaced by	Source
January 5	Fairy Tail: 100 Years Quest	TV Tokyo	July 7, 2024	Mashin Creator Wataru	
January 18	Ultraman Arc	TV Tokyo	July 6, 2024	Ultraman New Generation Stars (Season 3)	
January 26	Wonderful Pretty Cure!	TV Asahi	February 4, 2024	You and Idol Pretty Cure	
February 2	Shinkalion: Change the World	TV Tokyo	April 7, 2024	TomiPla World Norinori Times!! (Note: Shinkalion: Change the World airs reruns of 8 of its episodes before being replaced in its initial timeslot by TomiPla World Norinori Times!!)	
February 9	Bakuage Sentai Boonboomger	TV Asahi	March 3, 2024	No.1 Sentai Gozyuger	
February 12	Red Blue	TBS	December 18, 2024	Apollo's Song	
February 28	Dragon Ball Daima	Fuji TV	October 11, 2024	The Dinner Table Detective	
March 28	Omusubi	NHK	September 30, 2024	Anpan	
March 30	Run for Money: The Great Mission	Fuji TV	April 2, 2023	GeGeGe no Kitarō: My Favorite GeGeGe Generation (Note: This is a rerun of TV anime series 1 to 6 of the GeGeGe no Kitarō franchise)	
March 30	Yu-Gi-Oh! Go Rush!!	TV Tokyo	April 3, 2022	Where are we going with Pokémon?! (Note: Timeslot for Where are we going with Pokémon?! expanded for 30 minutes)	
April 5	Tōhai	TBS	October 5, 2024	Dandadan (Note: This is a rerun of the Dandadan TV anime's first season which previously first aired from October to December 2024)	
June 21	Ultraman New Generation Stars (Season 3)	TV Tokyo	January 25, 2025	Ultraman Omega	
August 31	Kamen Rider Gavv	TV Asahi	September 1, 2024	Kamen Rider Zeztz	
September 26	Anpan	NHK	March 31, 2025	The Ghost Writer's Wife	
December 13	My Hero Academia	TBS, Nippon TV	April 3, 2016	The Blue Wolves of Mibu (Season 2)	
December 14	Unbound	NHK	January 5, 2025	Brothers in Arms	

== Sports ==
Airdate	Sports	Network	Source
April 6	2025 Formula One World Championship	Fuji TV Next	
May 17-18	2024–25 Formula E World Championship	J Sports	
September 28	2025 MotoGP World Championship	G+	

== Special events and milestone episodes ==
Airdate	Show	Episode	Network	Source
May 22	Music Awards Japan 2025		NHK, YouTube	
June 20	Pokémon	Horizons series #100 "We Rising Volt Tacklers!"	TV Tokyo	
October 10 - October 24	Pokémon	Pokémon Episode: Mega Evolution	TV Tokyo	
December 31	76th NHK Kōhaku Uta Gassen		NHK	

== Deaths ==
Date	Name	Age	Notable Works	Source
January 3	Yuji Sawa	76	Producer of news and opinion shows (Fuji Television)	
January 8	Yoichi Onishi	??	Animation supervisor (Rilu Rilu Fairilu, Run for Money: The Great Mission, Mazica Party)	
January 8	Hiroshi Shinkawa	69	Theme song arranger (Cat's Eye, Kimagure Orange Road)	
January 19	Hirohiko Yokomi	63	Original creator (Tetsuko no Tabi)	
January 24	Tetsuhisa Seko	54	President/CEO of Nippon Ichi Software who are the original creators of the TV anime Makai Senki Disgaea	
January 29	Atomu Shimojō	78	Actor (Tokugawa Ieyasu), dubbing actor (Starsky and Hutch)	
February 2	Nobumasa Konagai	94	Editor of both Glass Mask and Sukeban Deka manga titles which are given TV anime and television drama adaptations	
February 17	Shin Tsukumo	??	Original creator (Edomae no Sushi)	
c. February 2025 (Note: Despite the fact that the actual date of it is currently unknown, Mizuki Itagaki's death was announced on April 17, 2025)	Mizuki Itagaki	24	Actor (Yell, Shuriken Sentai Ninninger)	
March 1	Monta Mino	80	Presenter (Quiz $ Millionaire)	
March 11	Ayumi Ishida	76	Actress (Ashura no Gotoku, Smile)	
March 18	Yōko Kawanami	67	Voice actress (God Mars, Armored Trooper Votoms)	
April 15	Ken Shiroyama	92	Voice actor (Naruto Shippuden, UFO Warrior Dai Apolon), dubbing actor (Courage the Cowardly Dog)	
April 18	Takashi Yamaguchi	88	Actor (Naruto Hichō, Kiso Kaido Isogitabi)	
April 28	Shigeru Tsuyuguchi	93	Actor (Edo no Kaze)	
May 13	Kiara	??	Bassist of NoisyCell who are the ending theme performers (Barakamon, Death Parade)	
June 11	Ayumu Saito	60	Actor (The Ancient Dogoo Girl)	
June 12	Shiho Fujimura	86	Actress (Ōgon no Hibi)	
July 3	Nagiko Tono	45	Actress (Chōjin Sentai Jetman, Super Rescue Solbrain, Blue SWAT)	
July 9	Masako Izumi	77	Actress (Shin Heike Monogatari, Wataru Seken wa Oni Bakari)	
July 22	Tsunehiko Kamijō	85	Actor (Hideyoshi, Space Sheriff Sharivan), dubbing actor (Go Go Gophers)	
August 1	Akiko Sekine	65	Voice actress (Sally the Witch, Aoki Densetsu Shoot!)	
August 9	NoB	61	Theme song performer (Saint Seiya, Tensou Sentai Goseiger)	
August 13	Tomo Sakurai	53	Voice actress (Macross 7, Pokémon, Super Doll Licca-chan)	
August 20 (Note: Tatsuya Nagamine's death was announced on November 13, 2025)	Tatsuya Nagamine	53	Director (HeartCatch PreCure!, HappinessCharge PreCure!, One Piece)	
August 27	Takaya Hashi	72	Voice actor (Fist of the North Star, Hugtto! PreCure, Pokémon)	
September 2	Kazuko Yoshiyuki	90	Actress (Tokugawa Ieyasu, Kaze to Kumo to Niji to)	
September 9	Asahi Kurizuka	88	Actor (Shinsengumi Keppūroku, Shinsengumi!)	
October 15	Kazuo Ikehiro	95	Episode director (Monkey, Shūchakueki Series)	
November 8	Tatsuya Nakadai	92	Actor (Shin Heike Monogatari)	
November 20	Atsushi Kagurazaka	59	Original creator (Taisho Baseball Girls)	
November 29	Tomomichi Nishimura	79	Voice actor (Rockman.EXE Axess, Fresh Pretty Cure!, Engine Sentai Go-Onger)	
December 14	Ryō Ishihara	94	Voice actor (Cyborg 009, Sally the Witch), dubbing actor (Captain Scarlet and the Mysterons)	
