= Shigeru Tsuyuguchi =

Japanese actor (1932–2025)

- 露口 茂
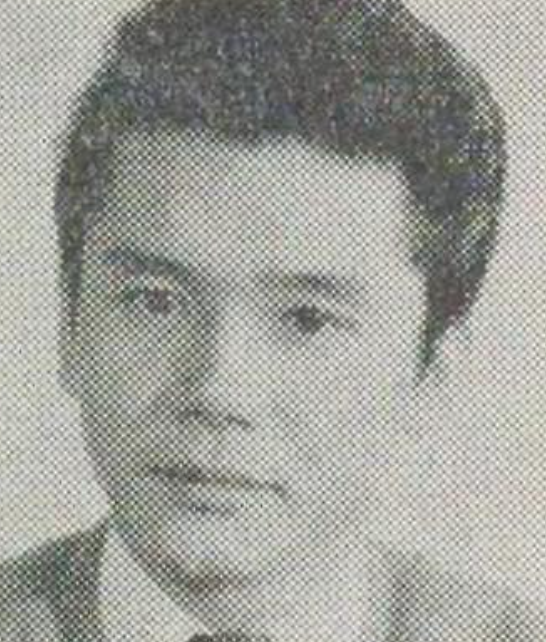
- Tsuyuguchi in 1978
- Born: 8 April 1932; Tokyo, Japan
- Died: 28 April 2025 (aged 93)
- Occupation: Actor
- Years active: 1955–1995

Shigeru Tsuyuguchi (露口 茂, Tsuyuguchi Shigeru; 8 April 1932 – 28 April 2025) was a Japanese actor.

== Biography ==
Tsuyuguchi was born in Tokyo and raised in Ehime. He attended Ehime University, but withdrew before completing his degree and joined the Haiyuza Theatre Company in 1955. His career as a screen actor started in 1959.

He came to prominence playing the thief in Shohei Imamura's Unholy Desire. He became one of Imamura's favorite actors, appearing in four of Imamura's other films (he also appeared in the stage play "Paragy Kamigami to Butabuta" directed by Imamura in 1962), including Eijanaika in 1981. But he declined Imamura's offer for him to play the role of Taro in Warm Water Under a Red Bridge (2001). He won White Bronze Award for his roles in Woman of the Lake and Yojōhan monogatari: Shōfu shino in 1966.

He appeared in many jidaigeki television dramas, in his early career he sometimes played villain roles. His most prominent roles in jidaigeki being Hyōgo Furukawa in the first season of Mito Kōmon and Fujiwara no Hidesato in the taiga drama Kaze to Kumo to Niji to. In Kaze to Kumo to Niji to, Tsuyuguchi played an important role that killed leading character Taira no Masakado in the final episode. Screenwriter Kōki Mitani quoted a Tsuyuguchi's line in Kaze to Kumo to Niji to in 2016 Taiga drama Sanada Maru because Mitani is big fan of Tsuyuguchi.

In 1981, he played a leading role for the first time in TV drama series in Fubo no Gosan .

He is best known for his part in Taiyo ni Hoero!, one of the most famous dramas in Japanese television history. In Taiyo ni Hoero!, he played detective Yammura ("Yama san") for 14 years and won great popularity. Detective Yamamura who he played was killed while on duty in the episode 691 "Saraba Yamamura Keiji !(Good bye detective Yamamura)". His first photo book "Tsuyuguchi Shigeru in Taiyo ni Hoero!"(Tsuyuguchi's photos from Taiyo ni Hoero!)was released from NTV.

From the late 1980s to the mid 1990s Tsuyuguchi appeared a lot of two-hour special dramas and played lead role. Tsuyuguchi played lead role in Morimura Seiichi no Shūchakueki Series 1–4 (directed by Kazuo Ikehiro), it is relatively famous in Japan. His final appearance as an actor is Morimura Seiichi no Shūchakueki Series 4 (Ao no Jūjika), which was broadcast on TV Asahi in 1994.

He also portrayed the voice of the "Baron Humbert von Gikkingen" in the original Japanese version of the Studio Ghibli anime film Whisper of the Heart in 1995.

He stopped acting in the mid 1990s and announced his retirement in 2013.

He died on 28 April 2025.

== Selected filmography ==
=== Films ===
Year	Title	Role	Director	Notes
1960	Soft Touch of Night	Yoshihiko Miyauchi	Yuzo Kawashima	
1962	Sanga Ari		Zenzo Matsuyama	
1963	The Insect Woman	Honda	Shohei Imamura	
1964	Kunoichi ninpō	Sakazaki	Sadao Nakajima	
1964	Unholy Desire	Hiraoka	Shohei Imamura	
1964	Kunoichi Keshō	Amakusa Senchiyo	Sadao Nakajima	Lead role
1965	Kiri no Hata	Masao Yanagida	Yoji Yamada	
1966	Woman of the Lake	Sakurai	Yoshishige Yoshida	
1966	Yojōhan monogatari: Shōfu shino	Oshima	Masashige Narusawa	
1967	A Man Vanishes	Shigeru Tsuyuguchi himself	Shohei Imamura	
1967	Tales of the Ninja (Band of Ninja)	Akechi Mitsuhide (Voice)	Nagisa Oshima	
1967	Soshiki Bōryoku	Tazawa	Junya Sato	
1968	Outlaw: Black Dagger	Takemiya Kunimatsu	Keiichi Ozawa	
1969	Onna Tobakushi Saikorogeshō	Hachōarashi no Masakichi	Yoshio Inoue	
1969	Watashi ga suteta onna	A Detective	Kirio Urayama	
1969	Hiken yaburi	Ryunosuke Nagao	Kazuo Ikehiro	
1969	Daimon Otokode Shinitai	Nonaka Tetsujiro	Akinori Matsuo	
1969	Gateway to Glory	Sergeant Yamashita	Mitsuo Murayama	
1969	The Falcon Fighters	Lieutenant Masaki	Mitsuo Murayama	
1970	Fuji sanchō	Tomizawa	Tetsutaro Murano	
1971	Gyakuen Mitsusakazuki	Ushio Keizō	Takashi Nomura	
1972	Lone Wolf and Cub: Sword of Vengeance	Kurando Yagyū	Kenji Misumi	
1981	Eijanaika	Kinzō	Shouhei Imamura	
1984	Fireflies in the North	Oga	Hideo Gosha	
1986	The Adventures of Chatran	Narrator	Masanori Hata	
1988	Rabu Sutōri wo Kimini	Chiba Shigeki	Shinichiro Sawai	
1990	Ruten no umi	Tsutsui	Buichi Saitō	
1995	Whisper of the Heart	Baron Humbert von Gikkingen (voice)	Yoshifumi Kondō	

=== Television ===
Year	Title	Role	Notes
1969	Mito Kōmon First season	Furukawa Hyōgo	
1971	Daichūshingura	Usuke	
1973	Kunitori Monogatari	Tsuzura Juzō	Taiga drama
1973	Kiso Kaido Isogitabi	Ginji	Tsuyuguchi and Yamaguchi's w Starring
1974	Amigasa Jūbei	Kobayashi Heyhachi	
1976	Kaze to Kumo to Niji to	Fujiwara no Hidesato	Taiga drama
1976–79	Edo no Kaze	Shimazu Hanzō	
1978	Edo no Uzu	Tatsuzō	
1979	Edo no Gekitou	Kemanai Izō	Tsuyuguchi and Kobayashi's w Starring
1980	Ashura no Gotoku Part2	Satomi Takao	
1981	Fubo no Gosan	Nakabayashi	Lead role
1983	Darekaga Watashi wo Aishiteru	Yazaki	
1983	Ōoku	Tokugawa Ienobu	
1972–86	Taiyō ni Hoero!	Seiichi "Yama-san" Yamamura	
1989	Onna Nezumi kozou	Naitō Minonokami	
1989	Onihei Hankachō Two hours special Unryūken	Horimoto Hakudō (Guest starring)	
1990	Naruto Hichō	Yoami	
1993	Unmeitōge	Yagyū Munenori	3 hours special drama
1990–94	Shūchakueki Series 1~4	Masanao Ushio	Lead role

=== Dubbing ===
- Doppelgänger (1972 TV Asahi edition) – Colonel Glenn Ross (Roy Thinnes)
- The Pirates of Bubuan (1972 directed by Shohei Imamura)
- The Invaders – David Vincent (Roy Thinnes)
- Sherlock Holmes (1989–94) – Sherlock Holmes (Jeremy Brett)
