= Japanese Style Originator =

Variety and quiz show presenting Japanese culture

Wafū Sōhonke (和風総本家) was a TV program produced by TV Osaka and aired on the TV Tokyo network. An edited version was shown on the Netflix streaming service, using the title "Japanese Style Originator". The show also aired with English subtitles on Nippon Golden Network.

The first iteration of the program had the format of a quiz show with one presenter or MC and five panelists. Panelists had to answer questions about Japanese etiquette, food, tradition, culture, and conventions to score points. The program often included meibutsu or tokusanhin in its final segment. In Japanese Style Originator - 2nd Generation, the format was updated to have the panelists simply giving commentary on the aired segments.

== History ==
As a TV Tokyo-produced program, it was known as "Japanese style test", shown in the "Sunday Big Variety" time slot. On November 4, 2007, production of the program handed over from TV Tokyo to affiliate station TV Osaka. The program title became "Japanese Style Originator", and premiered on February 18, 2008.

Since around 2011, remote segments focusing on specific themes and topics are mainly held, especially many times about Japanese craftsmen, and several introductions of Japanese etiquette and tradition. In most episodes, a final narration is performed at the end of the segment to finalize the theme.

In response to the death of the program's host Takeo Chii who appeared until the February 16, 2012 episode, a message of condolences was written on the official website on June 29, 2012. On February 8, 2018, the first collaboration with "a clinic where a doctor can be found" was performed, featuring Takahiro Azuma, Hisako Manda, and Kazuya Masuda (TV Tokyo announcer at the time).

A two-hour special was broadcast on September 20, 2018, representing the end of Season 1. The host, Kazuya Masuda, did not return for Season 2.

On October 11, 2018, the program was retitled Japanese Style Originator - 2nd Generation and the set was updated. Fuku Suzuki, a child actor, became the new host. Suzuki, Manda and Azuma would remain in the studio, commenting, while watching the remote segments with the other casts and craftsmen in the studio recording. The quiz segment of the show was abolished, but quizzes such as "Let's spot Nippon!" continued to be held in the form of mini corners.

The program ended on March 19, 2020.

== Cast ==
- Kazuya Masuda (the MC / 2008–2018)
- Takeo Chii (2008–2012)
- Hisako Manda (2008–2020)
- Takahiro Azuma (2008–2020)
- Takahiro Higashi (2012–2020)
- Fuku Suzuki (2018–2020)

Narrated by:

- Miyoko Asō (2008–2018)
- Youichirō Aoi (2008–2020)
- Gin Maeda (2018–2020)
- Sumi Shimamoto (2018–2020)

== See also ==
- Japanese craft
- Meibutsu
- Meisho
