= Shin Heike Monogatari =

Shin Heike Monogatari (新平家物語, lit. "New Tale of the Heike") may refer to:

- Shin Heike Monogatari (novel), a novel by Eiji Yoshikawa, translated into English as "The Heike Story: A Modern Translation of the Classic Tale of Love and War"
- Shin Heike Monogatari (film), a 1955 film based on the novel
- Shin Heike Monogatari (TV series), a 1972 television drama
