= Glen Grant (historian) =

American historian

- Born: February 23, 1947
- Died: June 19, 2003 (aged 56)

Glen Grant (February 23, 1947 – June 19, 2003) was a Hawaiian historian, author and folklorist. He was primarily known for his Obake Files, a collection of articles and stories regarding native and imported folktales and mythology in Hawaii. Grant was also the author of the Chicken Skin series of ghost story anthologies, as well as host of the long-running radio show of the same name.

== Life ==
Grant was born and raised in the west Los Angeles area near Palms and Culver City. He was the son of Hollywood special effects wizard Cliff Grant, who worked on such films as Gone with the Wind, The Wizard of Oz and Forbidden Planet. The elder Grant helped create the extraterrestrial robot Gort from The Day the Earth Stood Still and Robby the Robot from Forbidden Planet. "Robby eventually became a member of the Grant household, where the younger Grant said he would see the robot, stashed in the family garage, on a daily basis. Though the robot ultimately ended up in a museum, Grant was said to have "often affectionately remembered Robby the Robot as his brother."

Glen graduated from Hamilton High School in 1964. Grant received a bachelor's degree in history from the University of California, Los Angeles, and on an invitation from friend and UH professor Dennis M. Ogawa, took a trip to Hawaii in 1970. He made the move permanent the following year, earning a master's degree in education in 1974 and a doctorate in American studies in 1982, both from the University of Hawaii. He taught history, American studies and political science for more than 30 years in the UH school system and Hawaii Tokai International College, where he was a vice chancellor until the time of his death.

Grant was a popular instructor, known for a theatrical, lively style of teaching, in which he would wear historical costumes, use stage settings and deliver several lectures in character. This was especially so when he covered such subjects as American studies or classes on Japanese-American experiences.

As Grant's time in Hawaii grew, in addition to studying the cultures and geography of Hawaii and its inhabitants, he began to grow interested in the myths and legends both already present and brought in by other cultures. This, combined with a childhood love of ghost stories, led him to create what he would later call the Obake Files (the word obake being a Japanese word for ghost absorbed into Hawaiian Pidgin).

== Obake Files ==
Grant's Obake Files work can be divided into two parts: the scholarly Obake Files, and the entertainment-based Chicken Skin series.

=== Obake Files series ===
The Obake Files (documented in his books Obake Files, Secret Obake Casebook, and Obake: Ghost Stories in Hawaii) drew extensively from his interviews with residents and newspaper clippings of events that had been reported in Hawaii. He noted the correlation between some of these legends to ones from other nations, and theorized that as native Hawaiian stories (such as Nightmarchers) interacted more with spirits and legends (such as the Japanese kappa) brought by immigrants to Hawaii, the stories would blend to form a new kind of ghost story.

=== Chicken Skin series ===
Unlike the Obake Files, Grant's sense of the theatrical often led him to weave himself (and sometimes friends and colleagues) into the stories directly. For these stories he called them The Chickenskin Files (named after "chicken skin", the Hawaiian Pidgin term for goose bumps). These books often portrayed Grant as a professor somewhere between his normal self and Indiana Jones, setting out to see the mysteries of Hawaii and other places (Japan was the setting of one story) where legends had been imported to the island.

=== Chicken Skin Tales ===
(49 Favorite Ghost Stories from Hawai'i)

Chicken Skin Tales is a collection of Glen Grant's 49 favorite ghost stories that celebrate the supernatural traditions of Hawai'i. Based upon first-hand encounters with spirits, strange beings, poltergeists, fireballs and other "things which go bump in the night,"....Glen Grant has been collecting and telling the 'true supernatural tales' of Hawai'i for over twenty-five years. His Chicken Skin series have been shared in books, tapes, television, radio, and walking tours.

"A Brief Encounter at the Pali - The Japanese Television company had come to Hawai'i to do a special "obake season" program for a popular series based in Tokyo. The summer time is usually a period when ghost stories are very popular in Japan."

"I have been on this earth long enough to know that supernatural entities don't particularly jump out of the bushes at you on a regular basis. I know the difference between urban legend, natural reality and supernatural experience."

=== Chicken Skin radio show ===
Due to the popularity of his works, he soon earned a two-hour spot on local radio for his storytelling. Though the show had been named after the latter series, it was tailored mostly after the Obake Files in general, with investigations and interviews with residents and other experts on Hawaiian legends, some discussion of legends abroad and in other parts of the U.S., with the last half-hour of the show dedicated to a Chicken Skin-style story, usually featuring local voice talent or show staff members in roles.

Though the show was mostly scripted, there were moments of spontaneity. In a 1981 broadcast, Grant dismissed as rumor the May 19, 1959 Honolulu Advertiser report of a mujina seen in Hawaii. In that article, Advertiser reporter Bob Krauss wrote about a woman's encounter with the Japanese mythical creature at the Waialae Drive-In Theatre in Kahala. A caller immediately phoned him on the air, identifying herself as the witness in the article. She then gave more details on the event, including the previously unreported detail that the mujina in question had red hair. As years passed, on the show Grant himself later reported on a number of other mujina sightings in Hawaii, from ‘Ewa Beach to Hilo.

In addition to his radio work on Chicken Skin radio, he occasionally reported for National Public Radio as a cultural expert on Hawaiian legends.

== Other works ==
In addition to his Obake Files, Grant wrote numerous other books on Hawaii, its geography and its culture, such as his From Skies of Paradise series on Oahu and the Big Island; Waikiki Yesteryear, a book on the history of the famed Honolulu district; McDougal's Honolulu Mysteries, a collection of detective stories based in 1930s and 40s-era Oahu, all featuring hard-boiled Honolulu private eye Arthur McDougal; and Onipa'a: Five Days in the History of the Hawaiian Nation, a book on the history of the Kingdom of Hawaii.

He also co-wrote a biography on Hawaiian-born astronaut Ellison Onizuka.

== Later years ==
In 2000, Grant opened a cafe in the Moʻiliʻili district of Honolulu called "The Haunt". The cafe, an odd collection of B-Film memorabilia, books on folklore and mythology, and various other items from the occult to comics, was created as a home for "the creative and offbeat." The Haunt would later be expanded with the addition of an upstairs séance room, designed in the idea of 19th century-era American rooms of the kind.

In addition to the Haunt, Grant and volunteers started the Honolulu Ghost Walks, tours of local places in Hawaii tied into ancient mythology and current folklore. He also started "Obake Night" at the local Moʻiliʻili Festival, in order to continue the tradition of storytelling with groups.

On June 19, 2003, he died from cancer. He was cremated and his ashes were scattered at Kaena Point on the far western edge of Oahu. Some have said this to be the ideal resting place for Grant, as Hawaiian mythology places Kaena Point as the bridge between the worlds of the living and the dead.

== Awards ==
In 1979 he won the University of Hawaii (UH) Board of Regents Medal for Teaching Excellence for his work in Asian-American and Hawaiian studies. In 1995 the Honolulu City Council honored him as one of Hawaii's Living Treasures of Multiculturalism.
