= Edo no Uzu =

- Also known as: 江戸の渦潮
- Genre: Jidaigeki
- Directed by: Masahiro Takase; Yoshiki Onoda
- Starring: Keiju Kobayashi; Shigeru Tsuyuguchi; Ikko Furuya
- Theme music composer: Katsuhisa Hattori
- Country of origin: Japan
- Original language: Japanese
- No. of episodes: 23

Production
- Running time: 45 minutes (per episode)
- Production companies: Fuji TV, Toho Company

Original release
- Network: Fuji TV
- Release: May 1978 – November 27, 1978

Edo no Uzu (江戸の渦潮) is a Japanese television jidaigeki or period drama that was broadcast in 1978. The lead stars were Keiju Kobayashi and Shigeru Tsuyuguchi.

== Characters ==
- Karaki Hanbei: Keiju Kobayashi
- Tasuzo : Shigeru Tsuyuguchi
- Karaki Junnosuke : Ikko Furuya
- Bunta : Yasushi Ono
- Kinroku : Tonppie Hidari
- Umesuke : Masao Komatsu
- Okoma : Kumiko Okae
- Oine; Yuko Natori

== See also ==
- Edo no Kaze
