= Michiaki Koga =

Japanese politician (1903–1982)

Marquess Michiaki Koga
- 久我 通顕
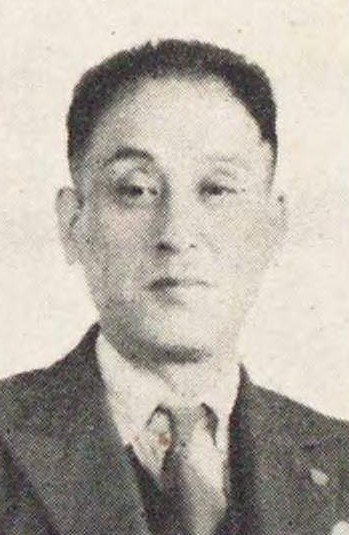
- Koga in the 1940s

Member of the House of Peers
- In office 1936–1947 Hereditary peerage

Personal details
- Born: 23 October 1903
- Died: 10 November 1982 (aged 79)
- Children: Yoshiko Kuga
- Relatives: Koga family
- Education: Kokugakuin University

Marquess Michiaki Koga (久我 通顕; 23 October 1903 – 10 November 1982) was a Japanese politician who served in the House of Peers. He was the father of actress Yoshiko Kuga.

== Early life and education ==
Koga was born on 23 October 1903, the eldest son of Marquess Tsunemichi Koga, a member of the House of Peers, and Masa (née Kitō). The Koga family were former kugyō. He succeeded his father as marquess in 1936. He graduated from Kokugakuin University having studied Japanese literature. He worked as a teacher of Japanese before World War II.

== Career ==
Koga served in the House of Peers as a marquess.

In 1943, he became a commissioner for the Home Ministry and became the president of Post Modern Commerce and Art Association.

== Personal life ==
Koga married his wife Yoshie Shinozaki. They had the eldest son Tomomichi in 1926, and eldest daughter Yoshiko in 1931.

== Death ==
Koga died on 10 November 1982, aged 79.
