= Bunichiro Onome =

Japanese bureaucrat and journalist

Bunichiro Onome (小野目 文一郎, Onome Bunichiro; 1863 – December 12, 1906) was a Japanese bureaucrat and journalist. He started the Nippon Shuho (日本週報), the first Japanese-language newspaper in Hawaii.

== Biography ==
Onome was born in Miyagi, Japan in 1863. After graduating from high school, he moved to Tokyo, where he became a teacher at the Toyo English-Japanese school. In 1886, he became an interpreter and moved to Hawaii to work for the Immigration Bureau. The Immigration Bureau was a Japanese organization that existed to maintain good relations between Japanese plantation workers and the plantation owners. When Onome arrived, he was disturbed by the huge pay disparity between Japanese laborers and the Immigration Bureau staff. The average male laborer earned $15 per month, while the Bureau's managers earned $200. It also didn't help that the head of the organization, Joji Nakayama, always sided with the plantation owners in exchange for extra compensation, earning $6,000 per year. Onome quickly resigned and returned to Japan in 1888.

Onome returned to Hawaii in 1892 and established the first Japanese newspaper in Hawaii, the Nippon Shuho, on June 3, 1892. It was a weekly publication that helped workers stand up to the Immigration Bureau and plantation owners. The Bureau was embarrassed by the exposure of their corruption, but continued to operate at the number of immigrant laborers on private (rather than government) contracts increased. Many later Japanese newspapers also took up positions against the plantation owners.

However, the Nippon Shuho was a short-lived publication because Onome closed it in 1894, after he caught beriberi. He moved to Keaʻau on Hawaii Island and started a coffee farm that covered several hundred acres. He also owned a store in Honokaa, but gave it to Katsu Goto. He fell ill again in 1905, and decided to return to Japan. He died in Tokyo on his way to Miyagi on December 12, 1906.
