= Tatsuya Ishiguro =

Japanese actor (1911–1965)

Tatsuya Ishiguro (石黒 達也, Ishiguro Tatsuya) (July 1, 1911 – Dec. 18, 1965) was a Japanese stage and film actor.

== Career ==
Born Teruzō Ishiguro in Hiroshima Prefecture and a graduate of Okayama Prefecture First Junior High School, Ishiguro joined the Shin-Tsukiji Gekidan (New Tsukiji Theater Company), which split from the Tsukiji Little Theater, and appeared in plays such as Katsuichi Wada's 1939 Kaientai. On August 19, 1940, he was arrested along with 13 other troupe members in the crackdown on the new theater movement, and the troupe disbanded on August 23 of the same year. He made his film debut in March of that year in Hikoroku Naguraru (Hikoroku Gets Pinched), directed by Yasuki Chiba, and after his release, he moved into the film industry. The following year, he was cast in a major role in Tadashi Imai's The Ecology of Marriage. After that, he played major roles in films such as Kyohiko Ushihara's Genghis Khan and Beacon Fires Rise Over Shanghai, a Sino-Japanese co-production filmed in Shanghai, and was active as a veteran actor with his imposing appearance and acting ability.

After the war, he joined the Daiichi Kyodan, an acting group founded in 1940 that included Ichiro Sugai, and appeared in films from various companies, including Nikkatsu and Shochiku, primarily in period dramas for Daiei. Although he was not as fortunate with the types of roles he had before the war, he was active in supporting roles such as villains and intellectuals. In his later years, he also appeared in many television dramas.

He died of stomach cancer at the age of 55 on December 18, 1965.

== Selected filmography ==
Year	Title	Role
1940	Hikoroku Naguraru	
1941	The Ecology of Marriage	Ichiro Sano
1941	My Love Story	Dr. Nitta
1941	The Sun of Eighty-Eight Years	Lieutenant Colonel Ida
1942	New Snow	National School Teacher Chiba
1942	Osaka Townspeople	
1943	Genghis Khan	Subutai
1943	Spring in the Wind and Snow	Dr. Sakuma
1944	Beacon Fires Rise Over Shanghai	Kuronosuke Nakamuta
1946	As Long as I Live	Takahashi, Special Police Section Chief
1947	Mr. Todoroki	Mr. Ishino
1947	Actress	Yozo Hirai
1947	Spring Awakening	Soji Hirobe
1949	Tengu hikyaku (Goblin Courier)	Detective Genshichi
1950	The Dawn Pursuit	Inspector Ishiguro
1952	Hakone Chronicles	Buzen-no-kami Okada
1952	Akō Castle	Denhachirō Tamon
1953	Gate of Hell	Yachuta
1953	Wife	Mihoko's uncle
1954	Rebellion	Major Miyagawa
1954	Black Tide	Head of Museum Department
1954	Messenger from the Moon	Prosecutor
1954	The Crucified Lovers (Chikamatsu Monogatari)	Isan
1955	All Living Things	General Affairs Manager
1955	Princess Yang Kwei Fei	Li Linfu
1955	Shin Heike Monogatari (New Tale of the Heike)	Taira no Tokinobu
1956	I Will Buy You	Tadashi Rokko
1957	The Great Chushingura	Kira Yoshinaka
1957	Samurai Nippon	Sawamura Ryuunsai
1959	Fires on the Plain	military doctor
1960	The Wandering Princess	Furuya
1961	The Human Condition III: A Soldier's Prayer	Cave Captain
1963	Daisanno Kagemusha (The Third Shadow Warrior)	Kyuzaemon Kashio
1963	A Legend or Was It?	Kimbei Takamori
1964	Three Outlaw Samurai	Uzaemon Matsushita
1964	Zatoichi and the Chest of Gold	Enzo
1964	Fight, Zatoichi, Fight	Monju no Waheiji
