= Yoshiko Kuga =

Japanese actress (1931–2024)

- 久我 美子
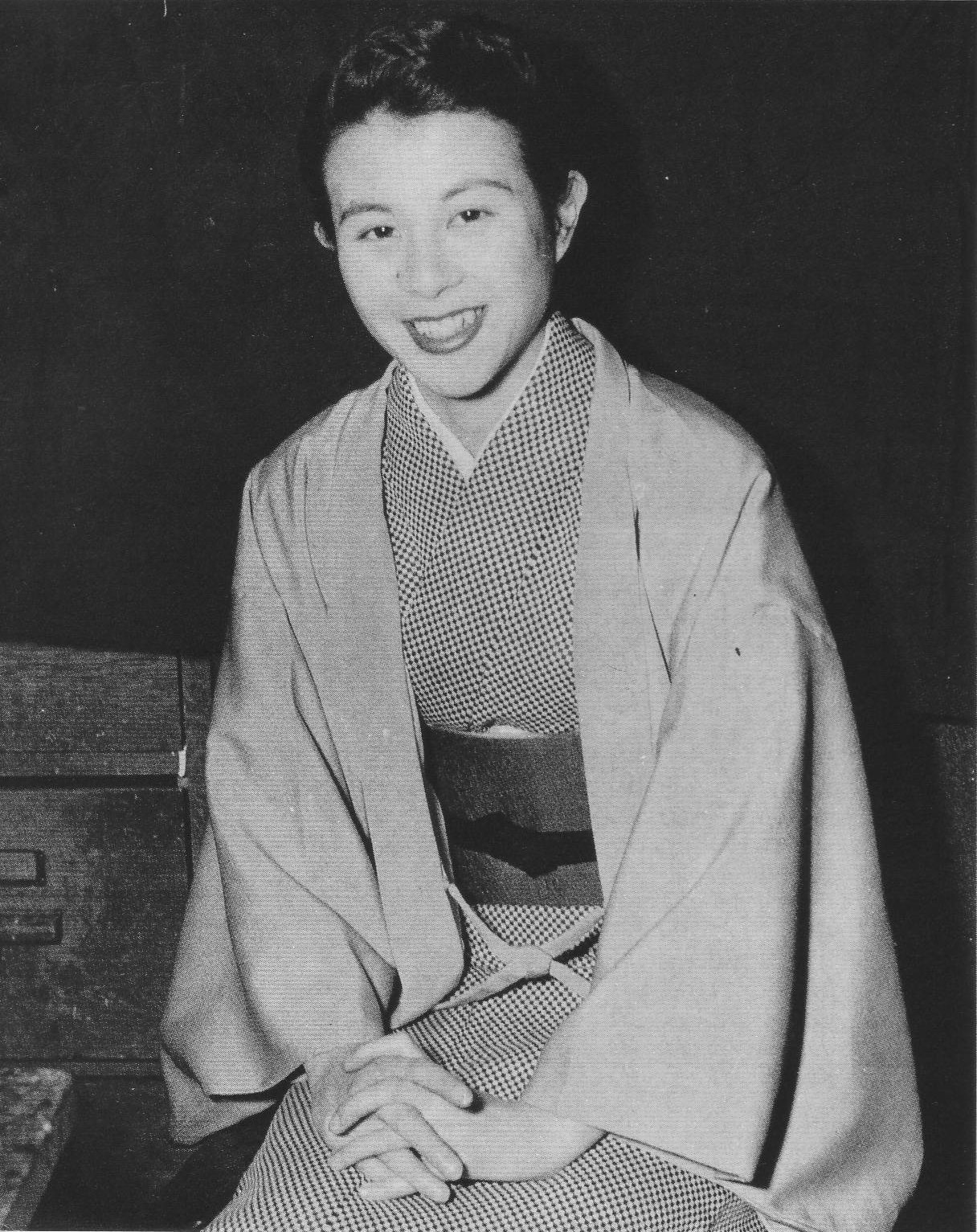
- Kuga in 1953
- Born: Haruko Koga; 21 January 1931; Tokyo, Japan
- Died: 9 June 2024 (aged 93)
- Occupation: Actress
- Years active: 1947–2000
- Spouse: Akihiko Hirata (m. 1961; died 1984)

Yoshiko Kuga (久我 美子, Kuga Yoshiko; 21 January 1931 – 9 June 2024) was a Japanese actress. She starred in The Woman in the Rumor (1954), Equinox Flower (1958), and An Inlet of Muddy Water (1953). She won a Mainichi Film Award in 1954, and a Blue Ribbon Award in 1956. She was the wife of actor Akihiko Hirata.

== Early life and education ==
Kuga was born in Tokyo, Japan. Her father Marquess Michiaki Koga was a member of the House of Peers.

In 1946, while still attending Gakushuin Junior High School, she became an actress for Toho studios.

== Career ==
In June 1946, Toho had sponsored a search for "new faces", choosing Kuga as one of 48 new actresses and actors from 4,000 applicants. In 1947, she made her debut as one of the lead actresses in the omnibus movie Four Love Stories (四つの恋の物語, Yottsu no Koi no Monogatari). She was one of the actors active in the 1948 union strike at Toho studios.

In the 1950s, she started working independently and starred in many productions of the Shochiku studios under the direction of Keisuke Kinoshita. She acted in The Woman in the Rumor by Kenji Mizoguchi, in Equinox Flower by Yasujirō Ozu, and in An Inlet of Muddy Water by Tadashi Imai.

In 1954, she co-founded the film production company Ninjin Club (Bungei purodakushon Ninjin Kurabu) with actresses Keiko Kishi and Ineko Arima to enable better working conditions for actors within the studio system. Since the 1970s, she appeared mainly on television and on stage.

== Personal life ==
Kuga was married to actor Akihiko Hirata from 1961 until his death in 1984.

== Death ==
She died from aspiration pneumonia on 9 June 2024, at the age of 93.

== Selected filmography ==
=== Film ===
- 1948: Drunken Angel (dir. Akira Kurosawa)
- 1950: Until We Meet Again (dir. Tadashi Imai)
- 1951: The Idiot (dir. Akira Kurosawa)
- 1953: Older Brother, Younger Sister (dir. Mikio Naruse)
- 1953: An Inlet of Muddy Water (dir. Tadashi Imai)
- 1953: Love Letter (dir. Kinuyo Tanaka)
- 1954: The Woman in the Rumor (dir. Kenji Mizoguchi)
- 1954: The Garden of Women (dir. Keisuke Kinoshita)
- 1955: Shin Heike Monogatari (dir. Kenji Mizoguchi)
- 1956: The Rose on His Arm (dir. Keisuke Kinoshita)
- 1956: Farewell to Dream (dir. Keisuke Kinoshita)
- 1957: Yellow Crow (dir. Heinosuke Gosho)
- 1957: Elegy of the North (dir. Heinosuke Gosho)
- 1958: Equinox Flower (dir. Yasujirō Ozu)
- 1959: The Snow Flurry (dir. Keisuke Kinoshita)
- 1959: Good Morning (dir. Yasujirō Ozu)
- 1960: Cruel Story of Youth (dir. Nagisa Ōshima)
- 1961: Zero Focus (dir. Yoshitarō Nomura)
- 1961: The Story of Osaka Castle (dir. Hiroshi Inagaki)
- 1964: Whirlwind (dir. Hiroshi Inagaki)
- 1989: Godzilla vs. Biollante (dir. Kazuki Ohmori) (cameo)
- 1997: Toki o Kakeru Shōjo (dir. Haruki Kadokawa)

=== Television ===
- 1974–1975: Karei-naru Ichizoku (NET)

== Awards ==
- 1954: Mainichi Film Award for Best Supporting Actress
- 1956: Blue Ribbon Award for Best Supporting Actress
- 1994: Kinuyo Tanaka Memorial Award at Mainichi Film Awards
- 1995: The Golden Glory Award
