= The Fierce Battles of Edo =

- Also known as: Edo no Gekito
- Genre: Jidaigeki
- Directed by: Masahiro Takase
- Starring: Keiju Kobayashi; Shigeru Tsuyuguchi; Takeo Chii; Yosuke Natsuki
- Theme music composer: Shunsuke Kikuchi
- Country of origin: Japan
- Original language: Japanese
- No. of episodes: 26

Production
- Running time: 46 minutes (per episode)
- Production companies: Fuji TV, Toho Company, Tsuburaya Productions

Original release
- Network: Fuji TV
- Release: May 31 – December 27, 1979

Edo no Gekito (江戸の激斗) is a Japanese jidaigeki or period drama that was broadcast in 1979. It aired on Nippon Golden Network as The Fierce Battles of Edo. This drama was inspired by Akira Kurosawa's 1954 film Seven Samurai and produced by the same film company. The lead stars are Keiju Kobayashi and Shigeru Tsuyuguchi.

== Plot ==
Hanasaki (Kobayashi) and Kemanai (Tsuyuguchi) are Yoriki of Edo machi-bugyō. One day, bugyō orders them to establish an unofficial battle group of ronin to protect Edo city from villains. The battle group is called Edo no Yougekitai. Ronin receive 5 kobans from Edo machi-bugyō as a reward for each battle.

== Cast ==
- Hanasaki: Keiju Kobayashi
- Kemanai: Shigeru Tsuyuguchi
- Machi: Yosuke Natsuki
- Eto: Takeo Chii
- Taki: Toshio Shiba
- Katakura: Kōichi Miura
- Sakai: Tonppei Hidari
- Shima: Taeko Hattori
