= Dennis M. Ogawa =

Dennis Masaaki Ogawa
- Born: September 7, 1943 (age 83); Manzanar, California, U.S.
- Education: UCLA
- Occupation: Professor
- Notable work: Jan Ken Po: The World of Hawaiʻi's Japanese Americans; Kodomo No Tame Ni - For the Sake of the Children; The First Nisei
- Spouse: Amy Ranko Ogawa
- Children: 3
- Awards: Order of the Rising Sun

Dennis Masaaki Ogawa (Japanese: 小川 正明, born 7 September, 1943) is a professor and former chair at the University of Hawaiʻi at Mānoa, American Studies Department and his teaching and research interests are in the area of Japanese American Studies, Television and Ethnic Identity, and Multicultural Studies. He received his Ph.D. from the University of California, Los Angeles in 1969 where he was honored as one of the founders of the UCLA Asian American Studies Center. He is the president and CEO of Nippon Golden Network.

== Early life ==
Ogawa was born on September 7, 1943, to Frank and Alice Ogawa while they were interned in Manzanar Relocation Center in Owen's Valley, one of ten Japanese American internment camps during World War II.

After the camps were closed, the Ogawa family returned to their home in Santa Monica, California. He attended John Adams Middle School and Santa Monica High School, graduating in 1961.

In 1966, Ogawa received his B.A. in communication from the University of California, Los Angeles. He received his M.A. in 1967 and a Ph.D. in 1969; while completing his doctorate, he helped to found the UCLA's Asian American Studies Center.

== Career ==
After completing his graduate work at UCLA, Ogawa came to the University of Hawaiʻi at Mānoa in 1969 as an assistant professor in the Speech Department. Stemming from his interest in Japanese American studies, he helped establish the Department of Ethnic Studies at University of Hawaiʻi at Mānoa and served as its director from its inception in 1970 to 1972.

He accepted a position as an associate professor in the Department of American Studies in 1971 and was promoted to professor in 1978, a position which he still holds today. Ogawa was graduate chair of American studies from 2001 to 2003 and chair of American studies from 2003 to 2007.

In 2016 he was awarded the Order of the Rising Sun, 3rd class (Gold Rays with neck ribbon).

== Notable works ==
Books

- From Jap to Japanese: The Evolution of Japanese-American Stereotypes, Mccutchan Pub Corp, June 1971.
- Jan Ken Po: The World of Hawaii's Japanese Americans, Foreword by Senator Daniel Inouye, Hawaii: Japanese American Research Center, 1973, paperback edition, University Press of Hawaii, 1978, 1979, 1982, 1992. Published in Japanese, Eihosha, Ltd. 1978 (two chapters). Transcribed into Braille and Cassette for State of Hawaii, Department of Education.
- Kodomo No Tame Ni – For the Sake of Our Children, with the assistance of Glen Grant (historian), foreword by Lawrence Fuchs, Hawaii: University of Hawaiʻi Press, July 1978: 1978; second edition, October 1978; paperback edition, 1980.
- Ellison S. Onizuka: A Remembrance, with Glen Grant, Hawaii: Mutual and Signature Publishing, September 1986; second printing, November 1986; third printing, April 1987. (Japan publication, PCM March 1989.)
- An Unlikely Revolutionary: Matsuo Takabuki and The Making of Modern Hawaii (assisted in autobiography), Hawaii: University of Hawaiʻi Press, July 1998.
- First Among Nisei: The Life and Writings of Masaji Marumoto, Hawaii Japanese Cultural Center of Hawaii, July 2007.
- California Hotel and Casino: Hawaii's Home Away From Home, with John M. Blink, Hawaii: Japanese Cultural Center of Hawaii, November 2008.
