= Masashige Narusawa =

Japanese screenwriter and director (1925–2021)

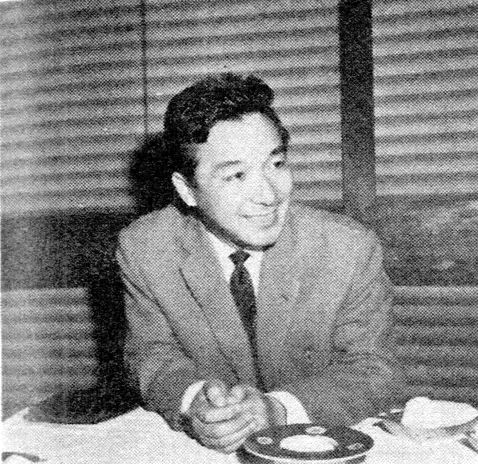
- Masashige Narusawa in 1961
- Born: 29 January 1925; Ueda, Nagano Prefecture, Empire of Japan
- Died: 13 February 2021 (aged 96); Tokyo, Japan
- Occupations: Screenwriter; Director

Masashige Narusawa (Japanese: 成沢昌茂, Narusawa Masashige; 29 January 1925 – 13 February 2021) was a Japanese screenwriter and director.

== Biography ==
Narusawa was best known for writing screenplays for the last films of director Kenji Mizoguchi, including The Woman in the Rumor, Princess Yang Kwei Fei, Shin Heike Monogatari, and Street of Shame. He directed six films and wrote over 80 screenplays between 1949 and 1975.

Masashige Narusawa died in Tokyo on 13 February 2021 at the age of 96.

== Filmography ==
=== Screenwriter ===
- The Scarlet Gang of Asakusa (1952)
- Tange Sazen (1952)
- The Wild Geese (1953)
- The Woman in the Rumor (1954)
- Princess Yang Kwei Fei (1955)
- Shin Heike Monogatari (1955)
- Street of Shame (1956)
- Chikamatsu's Love in Osaka (1959)
- Zen and Sword (1961)
- Love Under the Crucifix (1962)
- Black Lizard (1968)
- Curse of the Blood (1968)

=== Director ===
- Yojōhan monogatari: Shōfu shino (1966)
- Portrait of Madame Yuki (1975)

== Television ==
- The Scent of Incense (1965)
- Playgirl (1970)
