= The Woman in the Rumor =

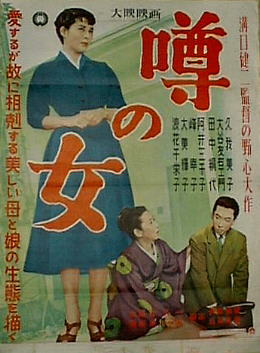
- Theatrical release poster
- Directed by: Kenji Mizoguchi
- Written by: Masashige Narusawa; Yoshikata Yoda
- Produced by: Hisakazu Tsuji
- Starring: Kinuyo Tanaka; Yoshiko Kuga
- Cinematography: Kazuo Miyagawa
- Edited by: Kanji Suganuma
- Music by: Toshiro Mayuzumi
- Production company: Daiei Film
- Distributed by: Daiei Film
- Release date: 20 June 1954 (Japan)
- Running time: 83 minutes
- Country: Japan
- Language: Japanese

The Woman in the Rumor (Japanese: 噂の女, Hepburn: Uwasa no Onna), also titled The Crucified Woman or The Woman of the Rumor, is a 1954 Japanese drama film directed by Kenji Mizoguchi.

== Plot ==
Widow Hatsuko maintains a successful tayū (highest class of courtesans) house in Kyoto. She is having a discreet affair with young doctor Matoba, who works for the courtesan guild and looks after her. One day, her daughter Yukiko returns from Tokyo following a suicide attempt, and Matoba begins to harbor feelings for the young woman.

Matoba wants to open his own medical practice and is considering a move to Tokyo. Hatsuko does not want him to leave her and implores him to stay. Meanwhile Yukiko deals with the shame of her mother's profession, as it was because of her boyfriend's family discovery of Hatsuko's background that he left her and Yukiko attempted suicide. Hatsuko is concerned when she hears of this, but remains in her chosen profession, as it has paid their way.

As time passes, Yukiko helps out at the courtesan house, and begins to feel compassion for the women who work there, seeing how their circumstances affect their choice to work at the establishment. Also, her feelings towards Matoba have changed, which leads to a confrontation between mother and daughter. Hatsuko has borrowed a million yen from Harada, who has been infatuated with her for years, to set Matoba up in his own clinic in Kyoto to keep him from moving to Tokyo. When Yukiko finds out that he was willing to take the money from her while wanting to use it so he and Yukiko could live in Tokyo together, she ends their relationship, instead following in her mother's footsteps as proprietress of the tayū house.

== Cast ==
- Kinuyo Tanaka as Hatsuko Mabuchi
- Tomoemon Otani as Kenji Matoba
- Yoshiko Kuga as Yukiko Mabuchi
- Eitarō Shindō as Yasuichi Harada
- Bontaro Miyake as Kobayashi
