= Yojōhan monogatari: Shōfu shino =

1966 Japanese film directed by Masashige Narusawa

- Film poster
- Directed by: Masashige Narusawa
- Screenplay by: Masashige Narusawa
- Based on: Kafū Nagai`s Yojōhan Fusumano Shitabari
- Starring: Yoshiko Mita; Shigeru Tsuyuguchi; Takahiro Tamura; Michiyo Kogure; Eitarō Shindō; Eijirō Tōno
- Distributed by: Toei Company
- Release date: February 17, 1966 (Japan)
- Running time: 89 minutes
- Country: Japan
- Language: Japanese

Yojōhan monogatari: Shōfu shino (Japanese: 四畳半物語 娼婦しの), also known as Four and A Half Mats, is a 1966 Japanese film directed by Masashige Narusawa. It is based on Kafū Nagai`s novel Yojōhan Fusumano Shitabari.

== Plot ==
Fukazawa Shino is a Prostitute in the late Meiji period. Shino was deceived by Tatsukichi and sold. One day Shino came to like a thief (Yoshioka) who came as a customer.

== Cast ==
- Fukazawa Shino - Yoshiko Mita
- Tasukichi Oshima - Shigeru Tsuyuguchi
- Tadashi Yoshioka - Takahiro Tamura
- Kimi Yoneyama - Yumiko Nogawa
- Kikuzo Segawa - Tatsuo Endō
- Taneko Tachibana - Michiyo Kogure
- Yasuzō Fukazawa - Eitarō Shindō
- Uyu - Eijirō Tōno
