= Takeo Chii =

Japanese actor

- Born: 5 May 1942; Chiba Prefecture, Japan
- Died: 29 June 2012 (aged 70); Minato-ku, Japan
- Occupation: Actor
- Years active: 1968–2012

Takeo Chii (地井武男, Chii Takeo; 5 May 1942 – 29 June 2012) was a Japanese actor. He appeared in more than 70 films between 1968 and 2012.

== Biography ==
Chii was the youngest of eight brothers. He made his acting debut in 1968. He made his film debut with Kihachi Okamoto's Kill!. Chii married actress Saori Maki in 1974 and had one daughter with her. Maki died in 2001 from breast cancer.

Chii was initially diagnosed with angina after a hospitalization in 1996, and warned by a doctor to not push himself too hard. Chii had multiple hospitalizations in 2012, after initially going to the hospital in January of that year due to concerns of vision loss. On 29 June 2012, Chii died of heart failure at the age of 70.

== Filmography ==
=== Film ===
- Kill! (1968) – Yaheiji Yoshida
- Red Lion (1969) – Spy
- Hangyaku no Melody (1970) – Hoshino
- Hiko shonen: Wakamono no toride (1970) – Jiro Iwami
- Hashi no nai kawa 2 (1970)
- Okinawa (1970)
- Stray Cat Rock: Wild Jumbo (1970) – Taki
- Men and War, Part I (1970)
- Shinjuku outlaw: Step On the Gas (1970) – Kamome
- Alleycat Rock: Crazy Riders '71 (1971) – Takaaki
- Men and War, Part II (1971)
- Hachigatsu no nureta suna (1971) – Ide
- Kumo no Yuna (1971) – Torazô
- Furyo bancho te haccho kuchi haccho (1971)
- Gyangu tai gyangu: Aka to kuro no burûsu (1972)
- Street Mobster (1972)
- Kaigun tokubetsu nenshô-hei (1972) – Kudo
- Erosu no yûwaku (1972) – Shôji
- Dobugawa gakkyu (1972)
- Akai tori nigeta? (1973) – Hasegawa
- Gokiburi deka (1973) – Nobuo Takei
- Retreat Through the Wet Wasteland (1973) – Gorô Harada
- Zenka onna: Koroshi-bushi (1973) – Tetsu Hamada
- Hatachi no genten (1973) – Suzuki
- Lady Snowblood (1973) – Tokuichi Shôkei
- Neon kurage: Shinjuku hanadensha (1973)
- Hissatsu Shikakenin Shunsetsu shikakebari (1974) – Sadaroku
- Tomodachi (1974)
- Honô no shôzô (1974)
- Akan ni hatsu (1975) – Tomoyuki Tonomura
- Minato no Yôko Yokohama yokosuka (1975)
- New Battles Without Honor and Humanity: Last Days of the Boss (1976) – Matsuzo Samukawa
- Ôzora no samurai (1976)
- The Inugami Family (1976) – Suketake Inugami
- Seishun no satsujinsha (1976) – Hidaka, Toru
- Hiroshima jingi: Hitojichi dakkai sakusen (1976)
- Okinawa Yakuza sensô (1976) – Ishikawa
- Yakuza senso: Nihon no Don (1977) – Kawabata
- Hokuriku Proxy War (1977)
- Nihon no jingi (1977) – Tomigashi
- Shin joshuu sasori: Tokushu-bô X (1977) – Prison Guard Ichirô Kajiki
- Botchan (1977)
- Proof of the Man (1977) – Detective Kusaba
- Seishoku no ishibumi (1978)
- Daburu kuracchi (1978)
- Ôgon no inu (1979) – Ryoichi Tanuma
- Ah! Nomugi toge (1979) – Tatsuji Masai
- Tenshi no harawata: Nami (1979) – Tetsuro Muraki
- Torakku yarô: Neppû 5000 kiro (1979)
- Tooi ashita (1979) – Oonoki
- Harukanaru sôro (1980) – Takatoshi Kan
- Tora-san's Promise (1981) – Kenkichi Odajima
- Himeyuri no Tô (1982) – Sergeant Major Ishi
- Gekko kamen (1982)
- F2 grand prix (1984)
- Bi bappu haisukuru (1985) – Onijima Shimazaki
- Be-Bop highschool: Koko yotaro elegy (1986–1988, part 1–5) – Onijima Shimazaki
- Michi (1986)
- Jittemai (1986) – Denzo
- The Tale of the Princess Kaguya (2013) – Okina (voice) (final film role)

=== Television drama ===
- Edo no Kaze (1975) (1st season)
- Edo no Gekitou (1979)
- Kita no Kuni kara (1981–2002)
- Taiyō ni Hoero! (1982–1986) – Toshizo Igawa (Toshisan)
- Hanekonma (1986)

=== Other appearances ===
Television

- Chii Sanpo (2006–2012)
- Japanese Style Originator (2008–2012)

Animated Film

- The Tale of the Princess Kaguya (2013)

Commercial

- House Foods
