= Fight, Zatoichi, Fight =

- Directed by: Kenji Misumi
- Written by: Seiji Hoshikawa; Tetsurô Yoshida; Kan Shimozawa (story)
- Produced by: Masaichi Nagata
- Starring: Shintaro Katsu; Nobuo Kaneko; Gen Kimura; Hizuru Takachiho
- Cinematography: Chishi Makiura
- Music by: Akira Ifukube
- Release date: October 17, 1964 (Japan)
- Running time: 87 minutes
- Country: Japan
- Language: Japanese

Fight, Zatoichi, Fight (座頭市血笑旅, Zatōichi kesshō-tabi) is a 1964 Japanese chambara film directed by Kenji Misumi and starring Shintaro Katsu as the blind masseur Zatoichi. It was originally released by the Daiei Motion Picture Company (later acquired by Kadokawa Pictures).

Fight, Zatoichi, Fight is the eighth episode in the 26-part film series devoted to the character of Zatoichi.

== Plot ==
A group of assassins stop a blind men pilgrimage making their way down the road. The assassins ask for Ichi, but they all claim variations of that name. They line them up against a building to look at their faces, but do not find Ichi and leave. One of the blind men brings Ichi out from his hiding place in the building, and they laugh at playing a prank on sighted men. Ichi goes on his way.

A pair of kago bearers convince Ichi to transport him so they don't have to return with an empty fare. The assassins see him enter, and head up the road to ambush him. On the way, the bearers stop for a woman who has collapsed in the road with her infant. Ichi insists she takes the carriage. The assassins ambush and kill the mother. The bearers, running back along the road, find Ichi who comes back with them. The headmen of the city arrive just after.

In the nearby city, they read the travel documents and learn that the woman, Otoyo, was traveling back home to meet her husband, Unosuke, a silkworm cocoon broker, in Miyagi Village. There is also a promissory note indicating Unosuke had run out of money while travelling, and left his wife behind as collateral in Nirazakizai. She seems to have paid off the debt and was travelling back to her husband with the baby boy. Because Ichi feels responsible for the woman's death, he volunteers to take the baby to Unosuke, and express his regrets. The village leader asks two villagers to accompany Ichi on the 60+ mile trip. They reluctantly agree. The leader also gives Zatoichi a lock of the dead woman's hair. The assassins note his departure, and follow to catch him once his guard is down.

They catch up with him in a town a short ways away. He makes out the five of them and accuses them of killing the woman. Ichi offers to meet them to fight after he delivers the baby. One attacks and is killed, but the rest of them retreat vowing that the Monju clan does not give up once it has accepted payment. Ichi returns to find his companions have run off in fear.

While continuing to following, the clan meets another boss, Hangoro, and asks for his help. He agrees and the two groups set off together.

They catch up with Ichi and attack while he is changing the baby's diaper. Ichi defends himself and kills several of them. The four remaining men from the Monju clan survive and retreat.

Ichi raises some money gambling, hoping to buy some softer diapers than the ones he's been scavenging from scarecrows and flags along the way. During his streak, the game boss offers some one-on-one gaming. The boss tries to rig the game, but Ichi catches him, evening the odds back up and winning a substantial amount. The boss's men follow and Ichi dispatches them while shushing them so the baby can continue sleeping.

The next night, Ichi hires a woman of the evening to watch the baby while he gets some sleep. She thinks it's weird, but agrees, deciding it is an easier evening than usual.

The next day, a woman thief, tries to use Ichi as cover from a victim. The victim wishes to punish the woman, even after Ichi returns the wallet. He poses as the thief's husband, then puts on a display of swordsmanship to dissuade him. The woman, Oko, after seeing how much money Ichi is carrying, offers to come with him and watch the baby. After some discussion he agrees to hire her.

At the next inn, Ichi exchanges greetings with the blind men's pilgrimage which is headed out as Ichi's party is checking in. During the night, Ichi is being watched. After Oko steals a nightingale whistle and Ichi calls her out on it, she quits in a huff. Ichi manages to make amends using the child. When she takes the baby to pee and it splashes on some wrestlers, Ichi goes to talk to them. While he is letting them pummel him a bit, one of the watching assassins throws Ichi's sword away from where it had dropped, and states to the wrestlers that he has a prior claim. Some sand in the face and hand-to-hand scuffling gives Ichi time to reach his sword and he dispatches three more of the assassins. The leader, Waheiji, slinks away.

During a scene on the road, the woman decides she will not steal any more.

At last, they arrive at Miyagi Village. The woman doesn't want to give up the baby right away, but Ichi insists they must give him up that day as he was only looking after him because of responsibility. She wishes to stay with Ichi, but he pays her and sends her on her way.

He brings the child to the house of Unosuke. When confronted with the documents, and the situation explained, he tears up the documents, and denies that he's ever been married. Furthermore, he accuses Ichi of trying to hit him up for support. He again denies having been married, and says he will soon be marrying the daughter of a boss in the area. Ichi sees what has happened and says he will take the child and raise him himself.

Outside, Waheiji waits, hiding. Oko also finds Ichi and notes he is still holding the baby. He tells her that Unosuke leaving his wife behind as collateral was his way of getting rid of her. Oko is happy; now she and Ichi can raise the child together. But Ichi insists that she stop following him.

At Unosuke's, Waheiji talks to him about Ichi, saying he knows his weakness, and asking for help in exchange for Unosake making a name for himself.

At the temple, Ichi pays respects to Otoyo. The Monk suggests that the temple take the child, pointing out that Ichi is yakuza and a drifter, and that it would be best for the child. One of Unosuke's men comes demanding Ichi upon threat of burning the temple down. Ichi leaves the child at the temple to face his pursuers in the woods, even though the Monk offers to hide him.

Men with tiki torches encircle Ichi, the sound of fire whooshing through the air. During the fight, Ichi is set on fire a few places, but manages to roll and put out most of the flames just as Waheiji attacks. Ichi kills him, then calls out to Unosuke asking if he's sure the child isn't his. Unosake admits he was lying, and swears he will raise the baby to be a man. However, as Ichi is trying to retrieve his sword, Unosuke tries to jump him and is killed.

Ichi leaves the baby at the temple and walks past Oko without saying a word. On the road, he is passed by the blind man's pilgrimage, but continues on his own way.

== Cast ==
- Shintaro Katsu as Zatoichi
- Nobuo Kaneko as Boss Unosuke
- Gen Kimura as Hyaku
- Chikara Hashimoto as Inozo
- Shosaku Sugiyama as Hangoro
- Ikuko Mori as Babysitting prostitute
- Hizuru Takachiho as Ko
- Tatsuya Ishiguro as Monju no Waheiji
