= On'yado Kawasemi =

Novel series by Yumie Hiraiwa

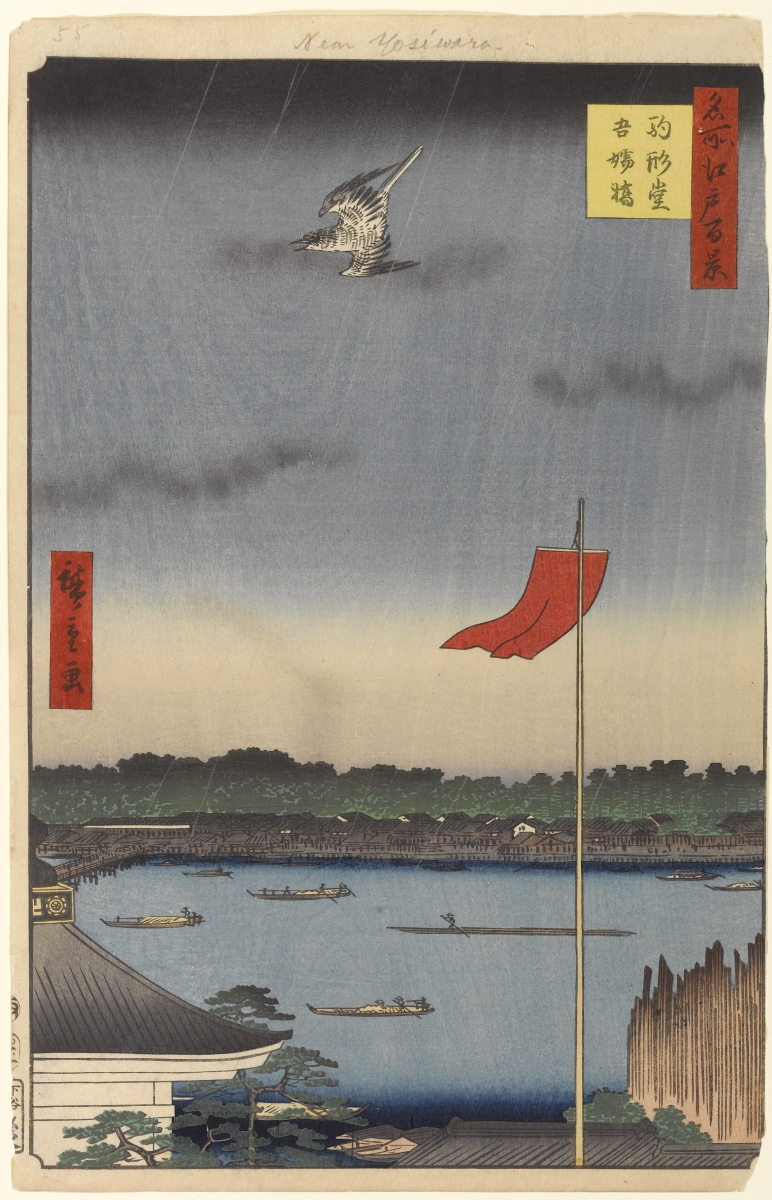
Azumabashi, near Ōkawabata in ukiyo-e

On'yado Kawasemi or On-yado Kawasemi (御宿かわせみ) is a Japanese series of novels written by Yumie Hiraiwa and dramas and a play based on it. It is set in "Kawasemi" ("kingfisher" in Japanese), an inn in Ōkawabata, Edo (now Sumida, Tokyo). It was serialised in a magazine Shosetsu Sunday Mainichi from 1973 but was interrupted because of the discontinuance of the magazine. Later, it was serialised in All Yomimono from 1982 to 2005. The story follows Shoji Rui, the landlady of the inn, who solves various incidents with the help of her lover Kamibayashi Tōgo and the constable Une Genzaburō.

== Plot ==
At the end of Edo period, Shoji Rui hands over her birthright to her relatives with the death of her father and begins running an inn "Kawasemi" in Ōkawabata. And she settles the matters in their daily lives with her lover Kamibayashi Tōgo, doshin (a sort of constable) Une Genzaburō, physician Amanō Sotarō, and O-Kichi.

== Characters ==
=== Main characters ===
Kamibayashi Tōgo
Younger brother of Kamibayashi Michinoshin and instructor of kendo. He helps Une Genzaburō cracking a case and pries into the affairs occur around him or among those who visit and lodge at Kawasemi.
Shōji Rui
Landlady of Kawasemi who marries Tōgo later.
Une Genzaburō
Doshin for Minami-machi bugyō. A serious and sincere man and one of childhood friends of Tōgo.

=== People of Kawasemi ===
Kasuke
Manager of Kawasemi.
O-Kichi
Head maid of Kawasemi who is very curious and likes chatting but has a phobia for ghost.

=== The Kamibayashi family ===
Kamibayashi Michinoshin
Elder brother of Tōgo who is yoriki for Minami-machi bugyō.
Kanae
Wife of Michinoshin and the eldest daughter of Asō Genemon.

=== The Une family ===
Chie
Wife of Genzaburō.
Gentarō
Son of Genzabutō.
Chiyo
Daughter of Genzaburō.

=== The Asō family ===
Asō Genemon
Hatamoto who is the father of Kanae and Nanae.
Asō Sōtarō (Amano Sotaro)
Physician who is a son of goten-i, a doctor employed by the shōgun and a son-in-law of Genemon. One of best friends of Tōgo.
Nanae
Wife of Sōtarō, daughter of Genemon and younger sister of Kanae.

=== Other characters ===
Chōsuke
Okappiki (a sort of private detective) for Une Genzaburō and owner of soba restaurant Chojuan though he leaves managing it up to his wife and son.
Sengorō
Another okappiki whose occupation is a cooper.
Matsuura Hōsai
Owner of Hōgetsukan, a kendo dojo in Mamiana where Tōgo instructs kendo. He has a profound knowledge of swords.

== List of novels ==
=== Bunshun bunko (pocketbooks published by Bungeishunjū) ===
1. On'yado Kawasemi (御宿かわせみ)
2. Edo no komoriuta (江戸の子守唄)
3. Suigō kara kita onnna (水郷から来た女)
4. Sazanka wa mita (山茶花は見た)
5. Yūrei goroshi (幽霊殺し)
6. Kitsune no yomeiri (狐の嫁入り)
7. Hōzuki wa koroshi no kuchibue (酸漿は殺しの口笛)
8. Shirahagi yashiki no tsuki (白萩屋敷の月)
9. Ichiryō nibu no onnna (一両二分の女)
10. Enma mairi (閻魔まいり)
11. Nijūrokuya machi no satsujin (二十六夜待ちの殺人)
12. Yogarasu O-Kin (夜鴉おきん)
13. Oni no men (鬼の面)
14. Kami kakushi (神かくし)
15. Koibumi shinjū (恋文心中)
16. Hacchōbori no yuya (八丁堀の湯屋)
17. Ugetsu (雨月)
18. Hikyoku (秘曲)
19. Kakurenbo (かくれんぼ)
20. O-Kichi no chawan (お吉の茶碗)
21. Inu hariko no nazo (犬張子の謎)
22. Kiyohime O-Ryō (清姫おりょう)
23. Gentarō no hatsukoi (源太郎の初恋)
24. Haru no takasebune (春の高瀬舟)
25. Takarabune matsuri (宝船まつり)
26. Chōsuke no nyōbō (長助の女房)
27. Yokohama bojō (横浜慕情)
28. Sasuke no botan (佐助の牡丹)
29. Hatsuharu benzaisen (初春弁才船)
30. Kijo no hanatsumi (鬼女の花摘み)
31. Edo no shōryō nagashi (江戸の精霊ながし)
32. Jyūsann sai no nakōdo (十三歳の仲人)
33. Koban shōnin (小判商人)
34. Ukare kichō (浮かれ黄蝶)

=== Hardcovers ===
1. Haru no kyaku (初春の客)
2. Shūgen (祝言)
3. Senju kannon no nazo (千手観音の謎)

== Adaptations ==
=== TV Series ===
On'yado Kawasemi
- Also known as: On'yado Kawasemi
- Genre: Jidaigeki
- Based on: On'yado Kawasemi by Yumie Hiraiwa
- Written by: Nobuyuki Ōnishi (Series 1–2); Takehiro Nakajima (2013 version)
- Directed by: Kiyū Okamoto (Series 1); Mitsuru Shimizu (Series 2); Rintarō Mayuzumi (2013 version)
- Starring: Kyōko Maya (Series 1–2 and 2013 version); Reiko Takashima (Series 3–5)
- Theme music composer: Shinichirō Ikebe (Series 1–2); Norihito Sumitomo (2013 version)
- Country of origin: Japan
- Original language: Japanese

Production
- Executive producers: Satoshi Murakami (Series 1); Takeshi Matsuo (Series 2); Tomoyuki Miyagawa (2013 version)

Original release
- Network: NHK; TV Asahi; Jidaigeki Senmon Channel
- Release: 1980 – 2005

NHK adapted the series to TV series in 1980, 1982, 2003, 2004 and 2005.

Series 1 was broadcast from 8 October 1980 to 24 March 1981 and Series 2 was broadcast from 6 October 1982 and 13 April 1983 by NHK. And in 2013, both series and newly produced episodes starring Kyōko Maya and is set in Meiji era were broadcast by Jidaigeki Senmon Channel, describing Kawasemi and those who are related to the inn twenty years later. It was produced by NHK Enterprize and Jidaigeki Senmon Channel with the intention to keep the tradition of jidaigeki and it is the first case in which NHK Enterprize did not produce a programme for NHK.

In 1973, TBS adapted one of the novels "Aki no hotaru" ("Fireflys in Autumn") to drama.

TV Asahi also adapted it to two TV dramas and one TV series, starring Yūko Kotegawa and Yasuko Sawaguchi respectively.

Cast
NHK Series 1 and 2 (1980–1983)

- Shōji Rui: Kyōko Maya
- Kamibayashi Tōgo: Akira Onodera
- Une Genzaburō: Takashi Yamaguchi
- Kamibayashi Michinoshin: Takahiro Tamura
- Kanae: Momoko Kōchi
- Kasuke: Tokue Hanazawa
- O-Kichi: Mieko Yūki
- Asō Genemon: Masami Shimojō
- Nanae: Naomi Hase (Season 1), Yoshie Taira (Season 2)
- Chōsuke: Kon Omura (Season 1)
- Sengorō: Morihiko Uchiyama (Season 2)
- Matsuura Hōsai: Seiji Miyaguchi (Season 1), Tōru Abe (Season 2)

NHK Series 3–5 (2003–2005)

- Shōji Rui: Reiko Takashima
- Kamihayashi Tōgo: Hashinosuke Nakamura
- Une Genzaburō: Kai Shishido (Series 3 and 4), Kazuki Sawamura (Series 5)
- Kasuke: Takehiko Ono
- O-Kichi: Machiko Washio
- Chosuke: Kimihiro Reizei (Series3), Jirō Keisetsu (Series 4 and 5)
- Matsuurra Hōsai: Yū Fujiki(Series 3), Gorō Ibuki (Series 4), Shigeru Koyama (Series 5)
- Amano (Later Asō) Sōtarō: Kazumasa Suzuki (Series 4 and 5)
- Amano Sōhaku: Masane Tsukayama (Series 5 only)
- Asō Genemon: Hisashi Igawa
- Nanae: Takami Yoshimoto
- Kamihayashi Kanae: Akiko Nishina
- Kamihayashi Michinoshin: Masao Kusakari

Shin On'yado Kawasemi (2013 version, broadcast by Jidaigeki Senmon Channel)

- Shōji Rui: Kyōko Maya
- Kamibayashi Tōgo: Akira Onodera
- Une Genzaburō: Takashi Yamaguchi
- Kanae: Keiko Kishi
- Kasuke: Takashi Sasano
- O-Kichi: Mieko Yūki
- Chōsuke: Mansaku Fuwa
- Kamibayashi Asatarō: Dai Watanabe
- Une Gentarō: Satoshi Matsuda

Aki no hotaru

- Shoji Rui: Ayako Wakao
- Kamihayashi Tōgo: Noboru Nakaya
- Une Genzaburo: Katsuhiko Kobayashi
- O-Kichi: Tsugiyo Ōjika

TV Asahi dramas (1988 and 1989)

- Shōji Rui: Yūko Kotegawa
- Kamihayashi Tōgo: Jun Hashizume
- Une Genzaburō: Kōichi Miura

TV Asahi Series 1 (1997–1998)

- Shōji Rui: Yasuko Sawaguchi
- Kamihayashi Tōgo: Hiroaki Murakami
- Une Genzaburō: Mitsuru Hirata
- Kasuke: Takashi Sasano
- O-Kichi: Yumiko Fujita
- Chōsuke: Saburō Ishikura
- Asō Genemon: Junkichi Orimoto
- Nanae: Hijiri Kojima
- Kanae: Haruka Sugata
- Kamihayashi Michinoshin: Masahiko Tsugawa

=== Play ===
It was adapted to a play and Yuko Hama played the role of Rui at the Imperial Theatre in 1984.

=== Comic ===
From 2012 to 2013, it was adapted to manga by Yuzuru Shimazaki and was published serially in a magazine "Comic Ran Twins". It was published as two volumes of books by Leed Publishing co, Ltd. in November 2012 and May 2013.

== Episodes ==
=== NHK Series(1980-1981) ===
No.	Title	Directed by	Written by	Original release date
1	"Woman from a Riverside Strict" "Suigō kara kita onna" (水郷から来た女)	Kiyū Okamoto	Nobuyuki Ōnishi	8 October 1980
Kidnapping occurs frequently in Edo and granddaughter of Kasuke is also kidnapped by somebody. Meanwhile, a woman called Hiro who is excelled in Kendo visits and matches Tōgo in his dōjō and he finds out something from her. She searches a man who eloped with her sister.
2	"When Deutzia Blooms" "Uno hana niou" (卯の花匂う)	Heihachirō Kobayashi	Nobuyuki Ōnishi	15 October 1980
A young samurai called Shindo kiichirō stays in Kawasemi with his maid. Kiichirō tries to take a revenge on a man but one day he suddenly meets his revenge and his mother who is a wife of him.
3	"Paulownia Flower Falls" "Kiri no hana chiru" (桐の花散る)	Kiyū Okamoto	Nobuyuki Ōnishi	22 October 1980
A zaimoku don'ya (wood sholesale dealer) Tadaya Kichiemon sees flower of paulownia and remembers O-Yoshi, his daughter separated from him 25 years before with tears. At the same time, a murder occurs in the suburbs of Edo and a gardener called Hanji is suspected and the name of his wife is O-Yoshi.
4	"A Waterfall in Ōji" "Ōji no taki" (王子の滝)	Yoshiyuki Yoshimura	Nobuyuki Ōnishi	29 October 1980
One day Tōgo visits Kawasemi with a woman but they left soon. A few days later, the woman visits Kawasemi again and entrusts Kasuke with a letter to Tōgo. After that, she is found dead in a Shinto shrine in Ōji and Tōgo becomes involved in the affair.
5	"Rui's Lullaby" "Edo no komoriuta" (江戸の子守歌)	Kōji Watanabe	Nobuyuki Ōnishi	5 November 1980
On a day with heavy rain, a couple lodges at Kawasemi and leaves their daughter on the next morning. Rui takes care of her like a mother. On the other hand, Michinoshin suggests a marriage with Nanae, younger sister of his wife Kanae to Tōgo.
6	"Murder in Summer Evening" "Yūsuzumi satsujin jiken" (夕涼み殺人事件)	Heihachirō Kobayashi	Nobuyuki Ōnishi	12 November 1980
Serial murders aimed at couples occur and it seems to be an act of samurai. However, another couple is killed by different ways and a girl called O-Tayo tells Togo that there was a tall man on the spot. Togo feels suspicious about why he didn't hide himself if he murdered them.
7	"Reencounter of Mother and Son on Tanabata" "Tanabata no kyaku" (七夕の客)	Kōji Watanabe	Nobuyuki Ōnishi	19 November 1980
A woman called O-Ryū and young man called Shinkichi lodge at kawasemi on Tanabata day every year. Tōgo happens to hear that O-Ryū is former wife of sake dealer and he identifies that they are not couple but mother and son.
8	"Fireflies in Autumn" "Aki no hotaru" (秋の蛍)	Kiyū Okamoto	Narito Kaneko	26 November 1980
On a rainy night, a man called Chōshichi with injury and his daughter lodges at Kawasemi. Chōshichi insists that he is bitten by a dog but Kasuke sees that it is a sword cut. As a matter of fact, Chōshichi is former head of a band of robbers.
9	"A Woman and Two Men" "Onnna ga hitori" (女がひとり)	Kiyu Okamoto	Nobuyuki Onishi	3 December 1980
O-Tami, daughter of Kasuke tells Rui about her friend O-Kachi. She works in an eating-house and lives with her brother-in-law Yokichi but she finances her undesirable lover Ichinosuke and cannot decide which man she should marry.
10	"Murder of Proprietress" "Onna shujin satsujin jiken" (女主人殺人事件)	Heihachirō Kobayahsi	Nobuyuki Okamoto	10 December 1980
A proprietress of teahouse (chaya) called O-Setsu is murdered and it is said that a samurai's visit to the teahouse causes her becomes showy. After that, a good-looking samurai visits Kawasemi. As soon as he realises that Rui runs the inn, he assaults her but she defends herself using her short sword.
11	"Sazanqua and an affair" "Sazanka wa mita" (山茶花は見た)	TBA	TBA	TBA
12	"Rui and Suga" "Shiwasu no kyaku" (師走の客)	TBA	TBA	TBA
13	"Mishap of Genzaburo" "Jonan kennan" (女難剣難)	TBA	TBA	TBA
14	"Mysterious visitors to Kawasemi" "Hatsuharu no kyaku" (初春の客)	TBA	TBA	TBA
15	"Snowfall in Edo" "Edo wa yuki" (江戸は雪)	TBA	TBA	TBA
16	"Murders caused by a cat" "Edo no kaibyo" (江戸の怪猫)	TBA	TBA	TBA
17	"Hot spring trip" "Yu no yado" (湯の宿)	TBA	TBA	TBA
18	"Secret of a husband" "Tamaya no beni" (玉屋の紅)	TBA	TBA	TBA
19	"Arranging a matter at a pleasure quarter" "Karasu o kau onna" (鴉を飼う女)	TBA	TBA	TBA
20	"Old friend" "Yoi sekku" (宵節句)	TBA	TBA	TBA
21	"A man who used to be a pickpocket" "Oyakusha Matsu" (お役者松)	TBA	TBA	TBA
22	"She-devil" "Onionna" (鬼女)	TBA	TBA	TBA
23	"Togo and Rui" "Hanabie" (花冷え)	TBA	TBA	TBA
24	"A couple in Kawasemi" "Hito wa mikake ni" (人は見かけに)	TBA	TBA	TBA
