= Masao Komatsu =

Japanese actor (1942–2020)

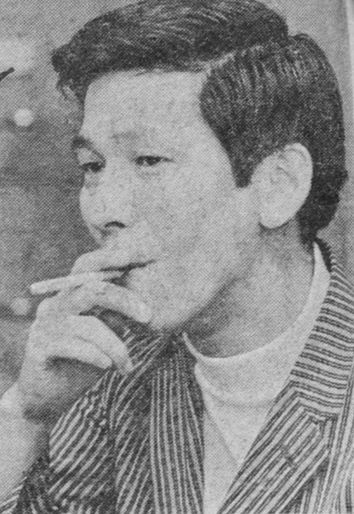
- Born: January 10, 1942; Fukuoka, Japan
- Died: December 7, 2020 (aged 78); Tokyo, Japan
- Occupation: Actor
- Years active: 1962–2020

Masao Komatsu (Japanese: 小松政夫, Hepburn: Masao Komatsu; 10 January 1942 – 7 December 2020) was a Japanese actor and comedian.

== Biography ==
Komatsu was born in Fukuoka on January 10, 1942. He died of hepatocellular carcinoma (liver cancer) at a hospital in Tokyo on December 7, 2020. He was 78 years old.

=== Films ===
- Kaiju funsen–Daigoro tai Goriasu (1972)
- Pink Lady no Katsudō Daishashin (1978)
- Station (film) (1981)
- Izakaya Chōji (1983)
- University of Laughs (2004)
- Journey to the Shore (2015)
- The Pledge to Megumi (2021)

=== Television ===
- Hissatsu Shiokiya Kagyō (1975) as Mamekichi
- Migoro! Tabegoro! Waraigoro!!
- Edo no Uzu (1978)
- Ōedo Sōsamō (1990–91), Rokusuke
- Sōrito Yobanaide (1997)
- Ōoka Echizen (1991–99)

=== Japanese dub ===
- ALF (1986–90), Willie Tanner (Max Wright)
- The Nude Bomb (1988 TV Asahi edition), Maxwell Smart (Don Adams)
