= Katsu Goto =

Japanese merchant

Katsu (or Jun) Goto (後藤濶) (née Kobayakawa) (1862–1889) was a Japanese merchant, interpreter, and lynching victim. He was the leader of a fledgling Japanese community in Honokaa.

== Early years ==
Goto was born in Kokufu-mura, Naka District, Kanagawa Prefecture. He was the eldest son of Izaemon Kobayakawa. He had three brothers and two sisters. After receiving an education, Goto worked as a city employee at the Port of Yokohama. It was there that he learned the English language.

== Career ==
On February 8, 1885, he came to the Kingdom of Hawaii as a government contract laborer aboard the SS City of Tokio. He was part of the first shipload of Kanyaku Imin; 25 more shiploads arrived over the next decade. Goto was contracted to a ʻŌʻōkala plantation that had been organized and managed by John Harris Soper prior to his 1884 appointment as marshal of the Hawaiian Kingdom. After working for three years in the sugarcane fields, Goto took over a general merchandise store on the Big Island that had belonged to Bunichiro Onome. Because of his English language fluency and his intolerance at seeing field workers being exploited, he often went to court in defense of the Japanese immigrant laborers.

Unpopular with the plantation managers, Goto was caught and hanged by a group of six men: Joseph R. (JR) Mills, a local hotel and mercantile store owner; Walter Blabon a drayman; Thomas Steele a luna or overseer on Robert Overend's plantation; William Watson a drayman who worked for J. R. Mills; and John Richmond, Overend's stableman. The sixth accomplice was a Hawaiian man named Lala, who fled the scene before the hanging. The group ambushed Goto on his way from Overend's Plantation after he met with Japanese workers regarding conditions on Overend's Plantation, hog tied and he was hanged from a telephone pole in October 1889.

After Deputy Sheriff Rufus Anderson Lyman informed Edward Griffin Hitchcock of Goto's murder in Honokaʻa, the suspects were caught. Charges were dropped against Lala and John Richmond for their cooperation with authorities, while the others were tried and found guilty of manslaughter. Mills and Steele were both convicted of second degree manslaughter and each sentenced to 9 years in prison, while Blabon and Watson were both convicted of third degree manslaughter and each sentenced to four years in prison. Steele and Blabon escaped from prison to Australia and California respectively, Watson served out his time, and J. R. Mills was pardoned in 1894 after four years in prison by the new government of Hawaii.

== Legacy ==
The episode became the subject matter of a 2001 play, Another Heaven. At least two biographies about Goto have been written, Katsu Goto: the first immigrant from Japan (1988) by Fumiko Kaya, and Hamakua Hero: a true plantation story (2010) by P. Y. Iwasaki. In 2010, a memorial in celebration of the 125th anniversary of Goto's arrival to Hawaii was erected in Honokaʻa; the Memorial Service Committee was composed of several people, including a Hawaii State Senator, Hawaii State Representative, members of the University of Hawaii at Hilo campus, and the Hiroshima-Hawaii Sister State Committee. The Katsu Goto Memorial Committee from Honokaa Hongwanji Mission produced a film in cooperation with Nippon Golden Network called Bringing the Legacy of Katsu Goto to Life about Goto's life and the humanities aspect of his story.

== See also ==
- Japanese in Hawaii
