= TV Osaka =

Coordinates: 34°41′26.2″N 135°31′15.6″E

JOBH-DTV
- Logo used since 2008 (Note: The logo's wordmark has been in use since 2003.)

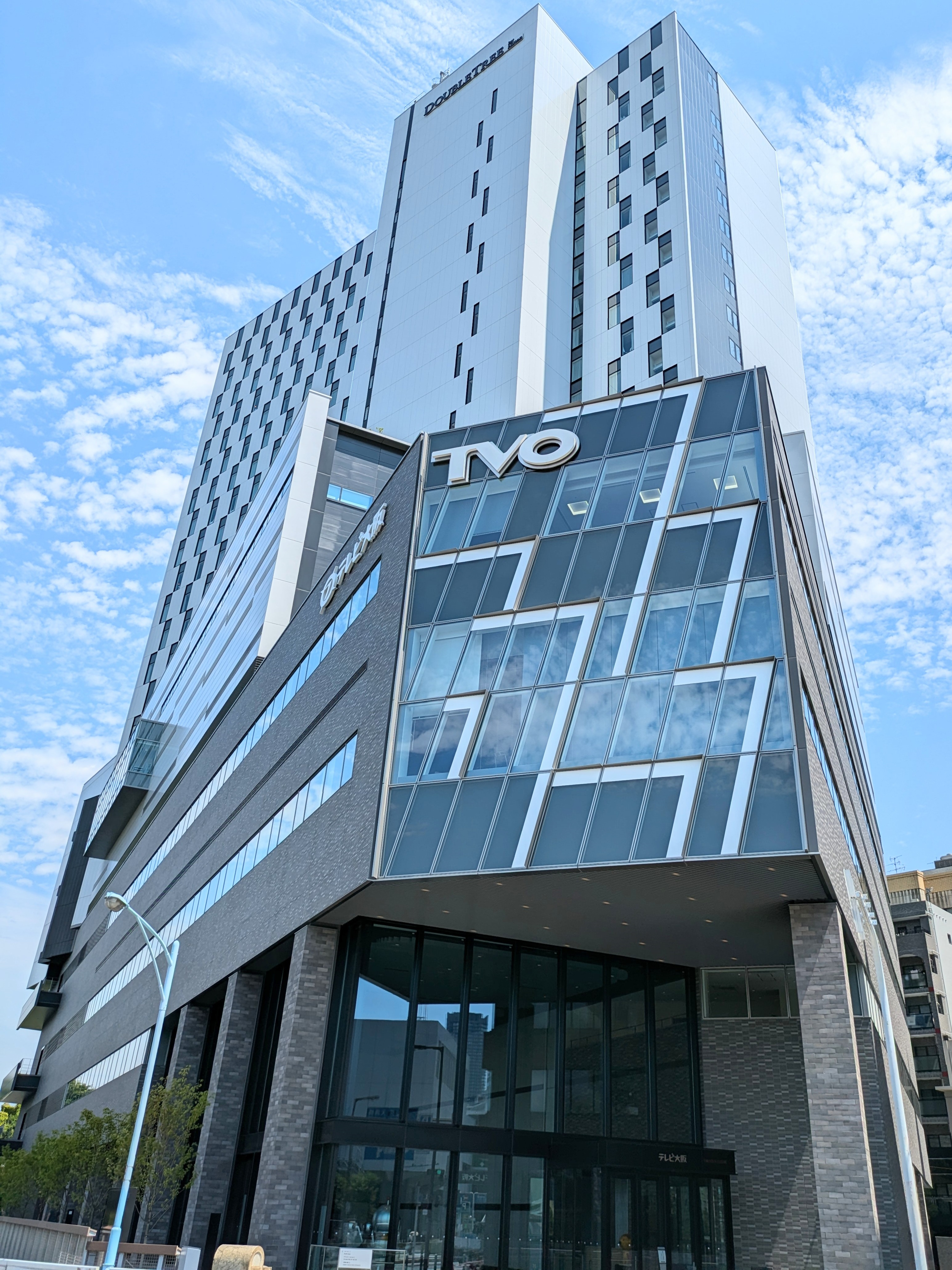
- Headquarters in Chūō-ku, Osaka
- Osaka Prefecture; Japan
- City: Osaka
- Channels: Digital: 18 (UHF); Virtual: 7
- Branding: TV Osaka; TVO

Programming
- Language: Japanese
- Affiliations: TX Network

Ownership
- Owner: Television Osaka, Inc.

History
- First air date: March 1, 1982; 44 years ago
- Former call signs: JOBH-TV (1982–2011)
- Former channel numbers: Analog: 19 (UHF, 1982–2011)

Technical information
- Licensing authority: MIC
- ERP: 24 kW

Links
- Website: www.tv-osaka.co.jp

JOBH-DTV (channel 7), branded as TV Osaka (テレビ大阪; TVO), is a Japanese television station serving as the affiliate of the TX Network for the Osaka Prefecture. Owned-and-operated by Television Osaka, Inc. (テレビ大阪株式会社, Terebi Ōsaka Kabushiki Gaisha), the station's headquarters and studios are in the Chūō-ku ward of Osaka. Nikkei, Inc. is the biggest shareholder of TVO. The mascot character is "Takoru-kun" (たこるくん).

Television Osaka, Inc. was founded in 1981 as part of the reorganization of Tokyo Channel 12 Ltd (now TV Tokyo). On March 1 the following year, TV Osaka started broadcasting as the first affiliate of the "Mega TON Network" (メガTONネットワーク, now TX Network) outside of Tokyo.

== History ==
In November 1978, then-governor of Osaka Prefecture Ryōichi Kuroda and local businessmen launched the "Committee for the Establishment of a New Television Station in the Osaka Area", to request the creation of a new regional television station for the Kansai region at the Ministry of Posts and Telecommunications. However, due to the strong opposition of the four existing regional television stations, the conditions of the license changed from covering the whole area to just Osaka Prefecture. On June 20, 1980, the Broadcasting Regulatory Council officially granted the use of UHF channel 19 for the new station, and 63 companies showed interest. With the help of Keizo Saji and other Kansai businessmen, the groups agreed in merging around Nihon Keizai Shimbun's proposal and solicit a broadcasting license under the name Television Osaka. On January 23, 1981, TVO held its founding general meeting and started work on its transmitter in the Mount Ikoma area (which was completed in March 1982).

On March 1, 1982, TV Osaka started broadcasting, as the first TV Tokyo affiliate outside of the Kanto region. The first program seen was The World of Kaii Higashiyama: The Path to Tōshōdai-ji Temple. TVO formulated three policies for its programming: "closer to local, urban and the business world". 53% of the programming came from other stations of the network while 47% was local. In 1983, TVO, TV Tokyo and the newly-launched TV Aichi formed the Mega TON Network (メガTONネットワーク), predecessor of the current TX Network, finally forming a network. In 1985, it broadcast its first professional baseball game from the Hanshin Tigers, setting its ratings record for the first time. In 1986, it aired eleven Tigers matches. In 1992 it broadcast Hanshin Tigers vs. Yokohama Taiyou, setting a new record high of 18.3%. In 1987, for its fifth anniversary, it held a series of special events, including a concert. As the company was stabilizing, it held its first dividend in 1988, paying 30 yen per share.

In 1992, TVO produced a series of special programs, including Challenge of 1.2 Billion People and The Story of Masao Koga; while on February 29, the eve of its tenth anniversary, it aired an all-night special program. With the creation of the J.League in 1993, TVO aired eighteen matches in its first year. That same year, it also aired the match between Japan and Iraq for the 1994 FIFA World Cup qualifiers, setting a new record high share of 32.6%. Regarding international cooperation, in November 1993, it aired the Sino-Japanese co-production Land of the Three Kingdoms, which took three years to complete. Due to its positive reception, it was followed by Land of Journey to the West in 1995. In 1993, the prime time ratings scored 5.2%, surpassing 5% for the first time. During Golden Time, it scored 4.8%, while the all-day average was 2.4%.

Since the increase in its businesses led to lack of room at its headquarters, TVO announced the building of new ones in March 1996, which were completed in October 1998. On April 1, 1996, it launched its official website. That year, it made a joint production with KBS Kyoto and Sun TV, Story of Three Cities, strengthening co-operation with the local UHF stations near Osaka. Ratings reached a new record high in 1999: 5.9% share during prime time and 5.3% during Golden Time.

On December 1, 2003, TV Osaka started digital terrestrial television broadcasts, using channel 7. Its launch coincided with the introduction of a new logo, adopted after a public contest. That year, the Hanshin Tigers won the professional baseball championship, attracting a 13.5% share with a peak of 21.7%. As part of the push for digital TV, it employed two philosophies upon its introduction: "business" and "intellectual entertainment". In 2006, Tears of Joy! Space-TIMES (感涙!時空タイムス) became the first TVO program to be seen on the national TXN network. Analog telecasts were terminated on July 24, 2011.

In 2005, TVO bought the Otemae Central Building, adjacent to its headquarters, and planned its remodelling. Its new headquarters began construction in 2021, and was completed in 2024. In 2022, it introduced a new logo. On May 13, 2024, the channel began broadcasting from its new headquarters.

== Programming ==
TVO mainly produces programs related to the business scene. At launch, it aired Kansai Business Frontline (関西ビジネス最前線), the first large-scale business program on local television. On April 11, 1983, over a year after its launch, it aired a special program on elections. In 1988, it began carrying the network's main newscast, World Business Satellite. In 1983, it started airing its first full newscast, Maido Wide 30 (まいどワイド30分). It was renamed News Hotto Line (ニュースほっとライン) in 1992. In October 1997, after TV Tokyo restructured its evening line-up, it was replaced by Evening Ichiban KANSAI (夕方いちばんKANSAI). In 2004, it was renamed Business 525 (ビジネス525), emphasizing more on business news. The current evening news service is named Yasashii News (やさしいニュース). In addition to business news, it also covers conventional and sports news. In 2005, it became responsible for TXN's Shanghai office, while also dispatching reporters to New York.

From 1997 to 2000, it collaborated with Yoshimoto Kogyo for Yoshimoto Chougoukin (吉本超合金), one of its most popular programs, to the extent where students who wanted to work at the station justified the program as an excuse in their work candidacies. The program was even sold to Thailand. Since then, TVO produced a string of programs featuring local Kansai comedians. In 2001, it produced Kirakira Afro (きらきらアフロ), a long-running talk show presented by Shofukutei Tsurube and Matsushima Naomi. From 2008 to 2020, it produced Wafu Sohonke (和風総本家), a program on Japanese pottery, representing the station's "intellectual entertainment", and aired on the network. In 1997, it produced the special drama The Rice General: The Man Who Challenged Yoshimune, starring Kataoka Tsurutaro and Enoki Takaaki.

The Fishing (THE フィッシング) is on the air since October 1983 and is currently the network's longest-running program. Famous personalities who do fishing as a hobby, such as Takashi Sorimachi and Masahiro Tanaka, also appeared in the program. TVO is responsible for the 9:30am Sunday morning slot for anime. In 1989, the channel aired MotoGP, for a period of ten years.
