= Proof of the Man =

- Film poster

Japanese name
- Kanji: 人間の証明
Transcriptions
- Revised Hepburn: Ningen no Shōmei
- Directed by: Junya Satō
- Screenplay by: Zenzo Matsuyama
- Based on: Ningen no Shōmei by Seiichi Morimura
- Produced by: Tatsuya Yoshida; Simon Tse
- Starring: Mariko Okada; Yūsaku Matsuda; George Kennedy; Toshiro Mifune; Takeo Chii
- Cinematography: Shinsaku Himeda
- Edited by: Jun Nabeshima
- Music by: Yuji Ohno
- Production company: Haruki Kadokawa Office
- Distributed by: Toei Company
- Release date: October 6, 1977 (Japan)
- Running time: 132 minutes
- Countries: Japan; United States
- Languages: Japanese; English
- Box office: $15 million (Japan rentals)

Proof of the Man (Japanese: 人間の証明, Hepburn: Ningen no Shōmei) is a 1977 Japanese crime drama film directed by Junya Satō, starring George Kennedy and Yūsaku Matsuda. It is an adaptation of the bestselling novel of the same name by Seiichi Morimura. It was produced by Haruki Kadokawa.

== Plot ==
A young black man from New York named Johnny Hayward (Joe Yamanaka) receives a sum of money. He buys new clothes and takes a flight to Japan. After he arrives, he is found fatally stabbed in an elevator in a Tokyo hotel at the same time as a fashion show by designer Kyōko Yasugi (Mariko Okada) is being held. The police department, including Munesue (Yūsaku Matsuda) and his partner (Hajime Hana), come to investigate. The only clue is the dying man's last words "straw hat". At the same time, a woman having an extramarital affair, Naomi (Bunjaku Han), is accidentally run over by Yasugi's son (Kōichi Iwaki). He and his girlfriend dump her body in the sea, but drops his watch at the scene. He is haunted by his actions and confesses to his mother, Kyōko, who suggests he flee to New York with his girlfriend.

Munesue starts to suspect that Kyōko knows more than she is letting on. He travels to New York to find out more about the dead man. There he is partnered with American detective Ken Shuftan (played by George Kennedy), who seems to be the same man who killed Munesue's father. Munesue finds that the young man is the son of a black American soldier and a Japanese woman. He also finds Yasugi's son, who deliberately provokes Shuftan into shooting him dead. Munesue returns to Japan and begins to suspect Kyōko. He travels to a resort and discovers that Kyōko was a prostitute in the years after the war. Finally he has enough evidence and confronts Kyōko that Johnny was her mixed-race son, and she killed him to protect her reputation. Kyōko commits suicide. In America, Shuftan goes looking for Johnny's father and finds he is dead. Then Shuftan is stabbed and dies.

== Cast ==
- Yūsaku Matsuda as Detective Koichiro Munesue
- Mariko Okada as Kyōko Yasugi
- George Kennedy as Detective Ken Shuftan
- Joe Yamanaka as Jonny Hayward
  - Hiraki Yamanaka as young Jonny
- Toshiro Mifune as Yōhei Kōri
- Hajime Hana as Detective Yokowata
- Kōichi Iwaki as Kyōhei Kōri
- Bunjaku Han as Naomi Oyamada
- Hiroyuki Nagato as Takeo Oyamada
- Janet Hatta as Yukiko Mishima
- Broderick Crawford as Captain O'Brien
- Robert Earl Jones as Willy Hayward
  - Alex Easley as young Willy
- Theresa Merritt as Mario
- Rick Jason as Lionel Adams
- Kōji Tsuruta as Lieutenant Nasu
- Kinji Fukasaku as Lieutenant Shibue
- Takeo Chii as Detective Kusaba
- Kōji Wada as Detective Kawanishi
- Junzaburō Ban as Onsen Owner
- William Sanderson as Gun Dealer

== Reception ==
The film was the second highest-grossing film of all time in Japan with theatrical rentals of $15 million (¥2.25 billion).

== Music ==
The theme song, titled "Ningen no Shōmei no Tēma" (人間の証明のテーマ) and featuring the line "Mama, do you remember", was a chart hit for Joe Yamanaka, selling 517,000 copies and reaching number 2 on the Oricon chart in Japan. It was also a hit in other Asian countries. In Chinese-speaking countries the song is called "The Straw Hat Song" (草帽歌), taken from part of the lyrics in the song.

== Television remake ==
In 2004, the movie was remade as a 10 episode mini-series for Fuji TV. Though the basic premise was maintained, the story was greatly expanded to include many additional characters and subplots. A number of details were also altered, such as Kyoko being a famous author turned political candidate rather than a fashion designer, and Johnny being from Mississippi rather than New York. The series also featured a different, more optimistic ending, with Kyoko being arrested and convicted for her crimes, Shuftan dying in the line of duty while defending a young black boy from an attacker, and Munesue continuing his career as a detective.

=== Cast ===
- Yutaka Takenouchi as Ichiro Munesue
- Bo Svenson as Ken Shuftan
- Yui Natsukawa as Kiriko Motomiya
- Keiko Matsuzaka as Kyoko Koori
- Sousuke Takaoka as Shohei Koori
- Ren Osugi as Atsushi Yokowatari
- Nao Matsushita as Michiko Asaeda
- Seiichi Tanabe as Tomoya Saeki
- Maki Horikita as Sayaka Koori
- Hiroyuki Ikeuchi as Johnny Hayward
