= Keiju Kobayashi =

Japanese actor (1923–2010)

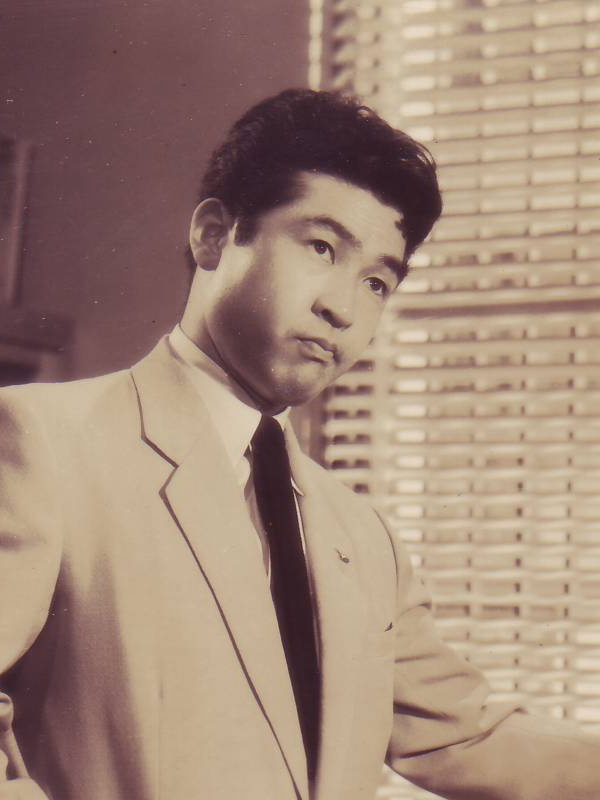
- Kobayashi in 1955
- Born: 23 November 1923; Gunma, Japan
- Died: 16 September 2010 (aged 86)
- Occupation: Actor
- Years active: 1942–2009

Keiju Kobayashi (小林桂樹, Kobayashi Keiju; 23 November 1923 – 16 September 2010) was a Japanese actor who appeared in 253 films in a career spanning 67 years.

Born in Gunma Prefecture, he began acting at the Nikkatsu studio after dropping out of Nihon University and made his film debut in 1942. In 1956 he moved to Toho film company. In a career that spanned 65 years, he appeared in over 250 films, most famously in the "Company President" (Shachō) comedy films made at Toho, where he worked alongside Hisaya Morishige, Daisuke Katō, Norihei Miki, and others. There he helped define the popular image of the postwar salaryman. He also won many awards for his acting, including best actor awards at the Mainichi Film Awards for The Naked General in 1958 (where he played Kiyoshi Yamashita), for Kuroi gashū in 1960, and for The Elegant Life of Mr Everyman in 1963. Kobayashi appeared in films made by such notable directors as Akira Kurosawa, Yasujirō Ozu, Mikio Naruse, and Kihachi Okamoto. He continued to give powerful performances after largely moving to television in the late 1960s.

He also portrayed the voice of the "Shirō Nishi" in the original Japanese version of the Studio Ghibli anime film Whisper of the Heart in 1995.

He died on 16 September 2010 of heart failure at the age of 86.

== Selected filmography ==
=== Film ===
- The Rainbow Man (1949) - Ryosuke Akashi
- Husband and Wife (1953)
- Night School (1956)
- Shūu (1956)
- A Holiday in Tokyo (東京の休日, Tōkyō no kyūjitsu) (1958)
- The Naked General (裸の大将, Hadaka no taishō) (1958)
- Kuroi gashū (黒い画集) (1960)
- The End of Summer (1961)
- Burari Bura-bura Monogatari (1962)
- The Elegant Life of Mr Everyman (1963)
- Sanjuro (1962)
- The Sword (1964)
- Samurai Assassin (1965)
- The Stranger Within a Woman (1966)
- Japan's Longest Day (1967)
- Shinsengumi: Assassins of Honor (1969)
- The Militarists (1970), Hideki Tojo
- Bakumatsu (1970)
- Battle of Okinawa (1971)
- Submersion of Japan (1973)
- Tora-san, the Intellectual (1975)
- Mount Hakkoda (1977) – Tsumura
- Imperial Navy (1981) – Isoroku Yamamoto
- Okinawan Boys (1983)
- The Return of Godzilla (1984)
- Tree Without Leaves (1986)
- A Taxing Woman (1987)
- Whisper of the Heart (1995) – Shirō Nishi (voice)
- To Love (1997) – Old Mr. Kamijo
- Vengeance for Sale (2002)
- Koi Suru Kanojo, Nishi e (2008)
- Hoshino Kunikara Magofutari (2009) Genichi Kuwano(Final film role)

=== Television ===
- Katsu Kaishū (1975, Taiga drama) - Tadahiro Okubo
- Kaze to Kumo to Niji to (1975, Taiga drama) - Taira no Yoshimasa
- Edo no Kaze (1975~1981, Edo series) - Magobei Hayashida
- Edo no Uzu (1978, Edo series) - Hanbei Karaki
- Edo no Gekitou (1979, Edo series) - Chobei Hanasaka
- Tokugawa Ieyasu (1983, Taiga drama) - Taigen Sessai
- Haru no Hatō (1985, Taiga drama) - Fukuzawa Yukichi
- Muta Kenji Jikenfailu (1983-2007) - Ichiro Muta
- Haikei Chichiuesama (2007) -Seisiro Kumazawa

=== Dubbing ===
- Lady and the Tramp – Tramp

== Honours ==
- Medal with Purple Ribbon (1985)
- Order of the Rising Sun, 4th Class, Gold Rays with Rosette (1994)
