= Takashi Yamaguchi (actor, born 1936) =

Japanese actor (1936–2025)

- Born: 17 November 1936; Hyogo, Japan
- Died: 18 April 2025 (aged 88); Tokyo, Japan
- Occupation: Actor
- Years active: 1963–2025

Takashi Yamaguchi (Japanese: 山口崇; 17 November 1936 – 18 April 2025) was a Japanese actor.

== Award ==
In 1966, he received the Elan d'or Award for Newcomer of the Year.

== Death ==
Yamaguchi died from lung cancer in Tokyo, on 18 April 2025, at the age of 88.

== Filmography ==
=== Television ===
- Taiga drama
  - Minamoto no Yoshitsune (1966)
  - Ten to Chi to (1969)
  - Kaze to Kumo to Niji to (1976) as Taira no Sadamori
  - Haru no Hatō (1985) as Kaneko Kentarō
  - Genroku Ryoran (1999) as Ōno Kurobei
- Ōoka Echizen (1970–2006) as Tokugawa Yoshimune
- Tenka Gomen (1970)
- Shinsho Taikōki (1973) as Toyotomi Hideyoshi
- Kiso Kaido Isogitabi (1973)
- Naruto Hichō (1978) as Hiraga Gennai
- On'yado Kawasemi (1980–83)
- Furuhata Ninzaburo (1994)
- Shin On'yado Kawasemi (2013)

=== Film ===
- Natsukashi Furaibo (1966)
- Fumō Chitai (1976)
- Bandits vs. Samurai Squadron (1978)
- Konokowo Nokoshite (1983)
- Hit Me Anyone One More Time (2019)
