= Kaze to Kumo to Niji to =

- Genre: Taiga drama
- Written by: Yoshiyuki Fukuda
- Directed by: Makoto Ohara
- Starring: Go Kato; Sayuri Yoshinaga; Takashi Yamaguchi; Masao Kusakari; Isamu Nagato; Yuriko Hoshi; Joe Shishido; Seiji Miyaguchi; Yumi Takigawa; Toshiyuki Hosokawa; Kazuko Yoshiyuki; Tomoko Naraoka; Minori Terada; Keizō Kanie; Kunishirō Hayashi; Kiwako Taichi; Kō Nishimura; Michiyo Aratama; Shigeru Tsuyuguchi; Keiju Kobayashi; Ken Ogata
- Opening theme: NHK Symphony Orchestra
- Composer: Naozumi Yamamoto
- Country of origin: Japan
- Original language: Japanese
- No. of episodes: 52

Production
- Running time: 45 minutes

Original release
- Network: NHK
- Release: 4 January – 26 December 1976

Kaze to kumo to Niji to (風と雲と虹と, Wind, Clouds, and Rainbow) is a 1976 Japanese historical television series. It is the 14th NHK taiga drama.

Average viewing rating was 24.0%, with highest peaking at 30.1%. It is the oldest NHK Taiga drama to date where all 52 episodes have been preserved.

== Plot ==
Kaze to kumo to Niji to deals with the Heian period in Japan. Based on Chōgorō Kaionji's novels Taira no Masakado and Umi to Kaze to Niji to. The drama was made with Go Kato's request after NHK abandoned the initial project of having the 1976 drama be about Katō Kiyomasa, which they already cast Go Kato for the lead role.

The story chronicles the life of Taira no Masakado.

The story begins with Masakado's childhood. Masakado happens to meet Fujiwara no Hidesato, and he thinks that he want to be great Samurai like Hidesato in the future.

== Production ==
- Original – Chōgorō Kaionji
- Music – Naozumi Yamamoto

== Cast ==
Starring role

- Go Kato as Taira no Masakado

Masakado's family

- Keiju Kobayashi as Taira no Yoshimasa, the father of Masakado
- Michiyo Aratama as Masako, the mother of Masakado
- Kenji Takaoka as Taira no Masayori, Masakado's younger brother

Masakado's retainers

- Masao Kusakari as Genmei
- Joe Shishido as Gendō
- Masakane Yonekura as Okiyo-ō
- Toyoshi Fukuda as Iwa no Kazutsune
- Masako Mori as Kikyo
- Yousuke Kondō as Miyake Kiyotada

Kunika family

- Takashi Yamaguchi as Taira no Sadamori, Masakado's rival
- Asao Sano as Taira no Kunika
- Yatsuko Tan'ami as Hideko
- Takeshi Sasaki as Taira no Morishige

Yoshikane family

- Isamu Nagato as Taira no Yoshikane
- Yuriko Hoshi as Senko

Yoshikane's family

- Isamu Nagato as Tairo no Yoshikane
- Yuriko Hoshi as Senko

Minamoto (Genji)

- Kō Nishimura as Minamoto no Mamoru
- Tōru Minegishi as Minamoto no Tasuku

People of Kantō

- Shigeru Tsuyuguchi as Fujiwara no Hidesato
- Kunishirō Hayashi, Hidesato's subordinate
- Seiji Miyaguchi as Musashi no Takeshiba

People of Kyoto

- Sayuri Yoshinaga as Takako, Masakado's lover

Others

- Keizō Kanie as Taira no Yoshimasa
- Fumio Watanabe as Taira no Yoshifumi
- Kiwako Taichi as Musashi
- Asao Koike as Ono no Michikaze
- Kazuko Yoshiyuki as Kera
- Minori Terada as Fujiwara no Masatsune
- Ken Ogata as Fujiwara no Sumitomo
- Noboru Nakaya
