= Kiso Kaido Isogitabi =

- Also known as: 木曽街道いそぎ旅
- Genre: Jidaigeki
- Directed by: Kazuo Mori; Yoshiki Onoda
- Starring: Shigeru Tsuyuguchi; Takashi Yamaguchi
- Country of origin: Japan
- Original language: Japanese
- No. of episodes: 17

Production
- Running time: 45 minutes (per episode)
- Production companies: Fuji TV, CAL

Original release
- Network: Fuji TV
- Release: April 1973 – July 27, 1973

Kiso Kaido Isogitabi (木曽街道いそぎ旅, Kiso Kaidō isogitabi) is a Japanese television jidaigeki or period drama that was broadcast in prime-time in 1973. It depicts toseinin (yakuza) in the Edo period.

== Characters ==
- Tatsu - Takashi Yamaguchi
- Ginji - Shigeru Tsuyuguchi
- Ochika - Yoko Machida
- Oshino - Mariko Kaga

== See also ==
- Kogarashi Monjirō
