= Seiichi Morimura =

Japanese novelist and author (1933–2023)

- 森村 誠一
- Born: January 2, 1933; Kumagaya
- Died: July 24, 2023 (aged 90)
- Writing career
- Notable work: The Devil's Gluttony
- Notable awards: Edogawa Rampo Prize (1969)

Seiichi Morimura (森村 誠一, Morimura Seiichi; January 2, 1933 – July 24, 2023) was a Japanese novelist and author, born in Kumagaya. He is best known for the controversial The Devil's Gluttony (悪魔の飽食) (1981), which revealed the atrocities committed by Unit 731 of the Imperial Japanese Army during the Sino-Japanese War (1937–1945).

== History ==
The Devil's Gluttony was serialized in the Shimbun Akahata (Japanese Communist Party's newspaper) in 1980, and subsequently published by Kobunsha (光文社), in two volumes in 1981 and 1982. In the ensuing controversy, half of a photograph was discovered to be a fabrication, and Kobunsha subsequently withdrew the book. A second edition was then published by Kadokawa Shoten in 1983 with the controversial photograph removed.

Morimura won the Edogawa Rampo Prize in 1969 for Death in the High-Rise (高層の死角).

His short story "Devil of a Boy" appears translated into English in Ellery Queen's Japanese Golden Dozen: The Detective Story World in Japan anthology, which was edited by Ellery Queen.

Seiichi Morimura died of pneumonia on July 24, 2023, at the age of 90.

== Adaptation ==
=== Television ===
- Fushoku no Kōzō (1977)
- Seishun no Shōmei (1978)
- Shūchakueki Series (1990-2022)
- Shikyaku Ukeoinin (2007, 2008)

=== Film ===
- Chō Kosō Hotel Satsuinjiken (1976)
- Proof of the Man (1977)
- Never Give Up (1978)
- Genghis Khan: To the Ends of the Earth and Sea (2007)
