= Hawaii Tokai International College =

Two-year college in Kapolei, Hawaii, U.S.

Coordinates: 21.357985°N 158.058105°W

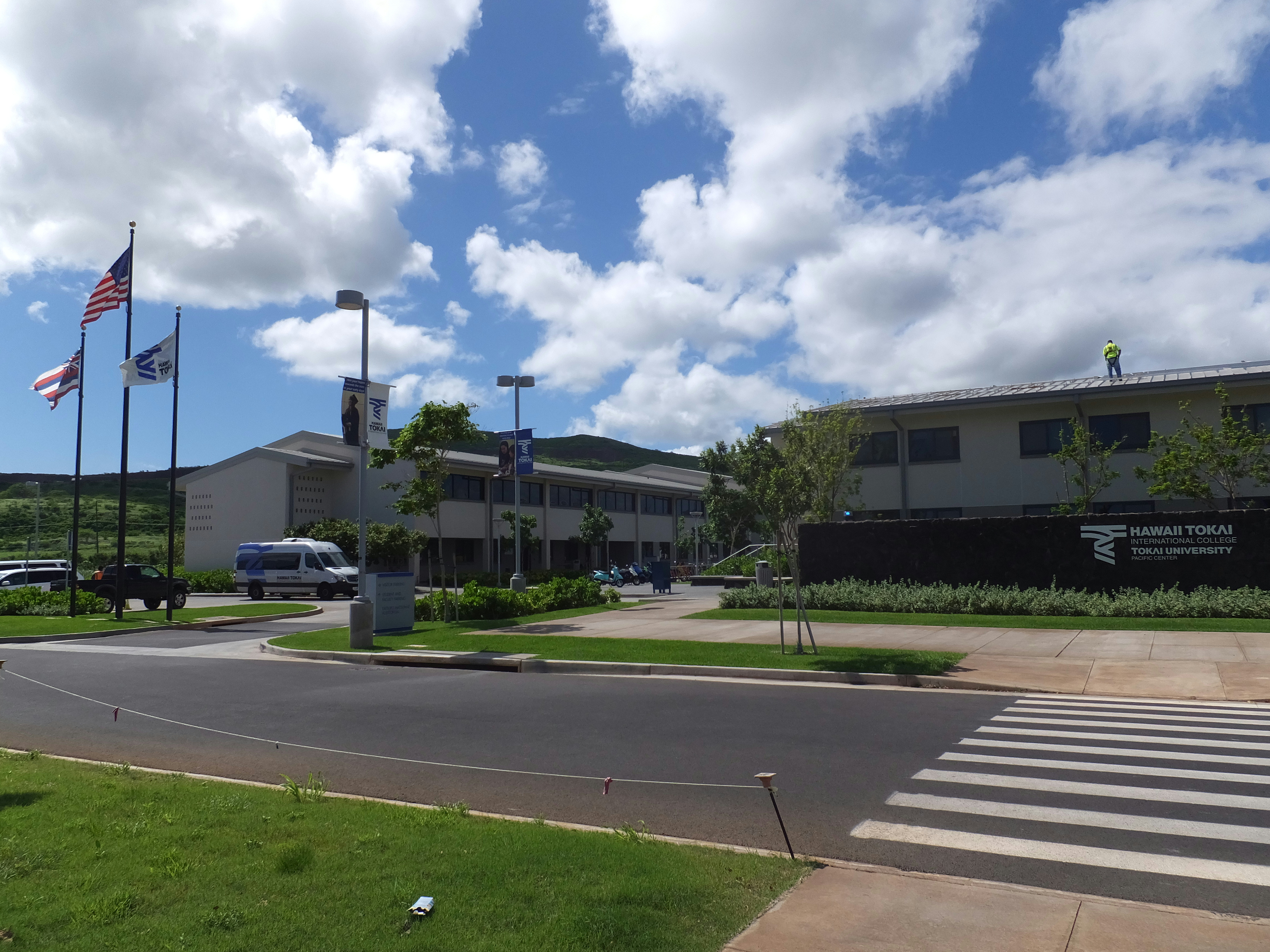
- Motto: "Classroom without Walls"
- Type: Private
- Established: 1992; 34 years ago
- Affiliations: Tokai University Educational System; ACCJC/WASC
- Chancellor: Naoto Yoshikawa
- Location: Kapolei, Hawaii, United States
- Campus: Suburban
- Website: http://htic.edu/ (English) http://htic.pr.tokai.ac.jp/ (Japanese)

Hawaii Tokai International College (HTIC) is an American two-year liberal arts college located in Kapolei, Hawaii. It was established in Honolulu on May 22, 1992, in the Mo‘ili‘ili community neighboring Waikiki. Initially called "Tokai International College," its first academic term began on October 8, 1992. In April 2015, HTIC relocated to its new campus in Kapolei, adjacent to the University of Hawaiʻi at West Oʻahu campus. The only American campus of the Tokai University Educational System (TES) of Japan, HTIC reflects the combined educational philosophies of Tokai founder Shigeyoshi Matsumae and former University of Hawaiʻi Vice President for Community Colleges Richard Kosaki.

== Liberal Arts Program ==
HTIC offers an Associate in Arts (A.A.) degree program with a major in Liberal arts. The Liberal Arts Program introduces students to various fields of knowledge, including the arts and humanities, languages, social sciences, natural sciences, and mathematics, and places a strong emphasis on learning and communication skills. The intent of the Liberal Arts Program is to foster in students a broad intellectual understanding of the individual and society, the natural environment, issues in the arts and humanities, and self-awareness. Those who have been accepted to the Liberal Arts Program are classified Liberal Arts students.

== College Preparatory Program ==
The goal of the College Preparatory Program is to acclimate international students to American college study for students intending to pursue a higher education in the English language.

== International Programs ==
Students enrolled in International Programs at HTIC engage in intensive study of English while pursuing research in fields such as anthropology, history, medicine, and marine science.

== Notable alumni ==
- Kenji Sakaguchi, Japanese actor and son of pro wrestler Seiji Sakaguchi, starring in various TV dramas, attended Hawaii Tokai International College.
