= Nippon Golden Network =

NGN
- Hawaii; United States
- Branding: Nippon Golden Network

Ownership
- Owner: Dennis M. Ogawa

History
- First air date: 1982

Links
- Website: https://twitter.com/ngn_tv

Nippon Golden Network (ニッポンゴールデンネットワーク), abbreviated NGN, is a cable television network broadcasting Japanese programs in Hawaii, United States. It is viewable in four islands in Hawaii (Kauai, Oahu, Maui, Hawaii) and California. Some of their shows have English subtitles.

The network has three channels at the moment, NGN (Japanese dramas, musical and variety shows, documentaries and educational programs), NGN2 (Japanese programs from NHK via TV Japan) and NGN3 (subtitled, classic and modern Japanese movies). NHK World is broadcast in partnership with NGN as NGN4.

== Former programs (incomplete) ==
- Ensen Isan (Railside Treasures)

=== Anime ===
- Dragon Ball (Japanese with English subtitles)
- Dragon Ball Z (Japanese with English subtitles)
- Dr. Slump (Japanese with English subtitles)
- GeGeGe no Kitarō (1985 series; Japanese with English subtitles)
- Galaxy Express 999 (Japanese with English subtitles)
- Fist of the North Star (Japanese with English subtitles)
- Futari wa Pretty Cure (Japanese with English subtitles)

=== Drama ===
- Oshin (Japanese with English subtitles)
- Lipstick (Japanese with English subtitles)
- Shumatsukon (Japanese with English subtitles)
- Densetsu no kyoshi (Japanese with English subtitles)
- Seigi wa Katsu (Japanese with English subtitles)
- Yonimo Kimyona Monogatari (Japanese with English subtitles)
- The Fierce Battles of Edo (Japanese with English subtitles)
- Choshichiro Edo Nikki

=== Own shows ===
- Bringing the Legacy of Katsu Goto to Life

== See also ==
- KIKU
