= Shūchakueki Series =

Television detective drama series in Japan

- Genre: Drama
- Written by: Katsumi Okamoto, Kazuo Ikehiro
- Directed by: Kazuo Ikehiro
- Starring: Shigeru Tsuyuguchi 1-4; Tsurutaro Kataoka 5-38
- Theme music composer: Katsuo Ōno
- Country of origin: Japan
- Original language: Japanese
- No. of episodes: 38

Production
- Production companies: TV Asahi, Toei

Original release
- Network: TV Asahi
- Release: December 8, 1990 – December 22, 2022

Shūchakueki Series (終着駅シリーズ, Terminal Station Series), also known as Morimura Seiichi no Shūchakueki, is a Japanese long-running prime-time television detective drama series in Japan that first aired on TV Asahi in 1990. Based on Seiichi Morimura's Ushiokeiji no Jikenbo series.

Shigeru Tsuyuguchi played the lead role in the first four episodes, Tsurutaro Kataoka has been playing the lead role since the fifth episode. Masanao Ushio is a detective of Nishi Shinjuku Police station, his nickname is Moo-san. He solves incidents with his great insight and intelligence.

Some episodes have aired on KIKU with English subtitles. The DVD box was released on November 8, 2023.

== Cast ==
- Shigeru Tsuyuguchi as Masanao Ushio (Episode 1–4)
- Gen Kimura as Hirabayashi (Episode 1–4)
- Tsurutaro Kataoka as Masanao Ushio (Episode 5-38)
- Kumiko Okae as Sumiyo Ushio (Episode 7-36)
- Akira Nagoya as Sakamoto (Episode 5, 7–17)
- Taisaku Akino as Sakamoto (Episode 17-38)

== Episodes ==
=== Shigeru Tsuyuguchi as Masanao Ushio (1990-94) ===
- 1. Shūressha (December 8, 1990); Susumu Kurobe as Onaka Kazuyuki, Naoya Makoto as Detective Haraguchi, Tadashi Yokouchi as Mogami Hideyuki
- 2. Shūchakueki (February 1, 1992); Tōru Minegishi as Mizuma Tasuhiko, Eiichiro Funakoshi as Kurasaki Shinya, Hiro Komura as Miyasaka Yukiko
- 3. Shikeidai no Butai (November 7, 1992); Yoko Moriguchi as Igusa Mamiko, Kenichi Endō as Iba Hiroshi
- 4. Ao no Jūjika (September 24, 1994); Yu-ki Matsumura as Nagumo Hirotada, Takako Miki as Yabuki Asako

=== Tsurutaro Kataoka as Masanao Ushio (1996-now) ===
- 5. Hokoriaru Higaisha (January 27, 1996)
- 6. Ningeno no Jūjika (September 28, 1996)
- 7. Machi (March 22, 1997)
- 8. Mado (March 28, 1998)
- 9. Eki (November 28, 1998); Kei Ishibashi as Aoyama Sachi, Momiji Yamamura as Tsutsumi Yoshiko
- 10. Murder of a Flower-Viewing Guest (March 27, 1999); Minako Tanaka as Nagasaki Minako, Takanori Higuchi as Nagasaki Shinsuke
- 11. Murder Credit (August 28, 1999)
- 12. Yako Ressha (February 5, 2000)
- 13. Satsujin no Funin (January 13, 2001); Satoko Takemoto as Ashita Megumi
- 14. Sabaku no Anshō (September 22, 2001); Naomi Hosokawa as Michiyuki Yumiko, Masanori Ikeda as Kanda Naoya
- 15. Sabaku no Eki (February 8, 2003)
- 16. Kabe no Me (July 5, 2003)
- 17. Muteki no Yoin (October 2, 2004); Takami Yoshimoto as Erimura Tazuko and Shizuko,
- 18. Hakon no Jōken (August 20, 2005); Mami Nomura as Satomi Masae, Satoshi Jinbo as Nakanishi Mitsuhiko
- 19. Shisha no Haitatsunin (March 25, 2006)
- 20. Sabaku no Kissaten (October 28, 2006); Ryoko Yuui as Obana Fujie, Bengal as Jibiki, Takeo Nakahara as Inaba
- 21. Aku no Jōken (September 22, 2007)
- 22. Satsujin Doumei (March 14, 2009); Atsuko Sakurai as Takabayashi Yuko
- 23. Shisa-ji (October 10, 2009); Kaori Takahashi as Niki Seiko, Hiromi Nakajima as Yanagawa Naomi
- 24. Shūchakueki (Note: Remake from the second episode.) (July 31, 2010); Noriko Aoyama as Mikami Junko, Yuko Takayama as Miyaji Yukiko, Masahiro Komoto as Mizuma Tatsuhiko
- 25. Tochū Gesha Suru Onna (September 24, 2011)
- 26. Satsui no Honryu (October 27, 2012); Natsuki Harada as Izawa Miho, Kazuya Takahashi as Chiba Ryugo
- 27. Akuno Tamashii (September 28, 2013); Sayuri Kokushō as Kawana Megumi
- 28. Zankokuna Shikai (June 28, 2014)
- 29. Umbrella of Goodwill - Murderer on a Rainy Night!! A Husband was Murdered!? (2015); Riona Hazuki as Yamano Kyoko
- 30. Murder Credit - Victim's Pandora's Box!! Unsolved Murder Under the Lake... (Note: Remake from the eleventh episode.) (2016); Sei Matobu as Munakata Ayuko, Gamon Kaai as Okamoto Hiroshi
- 31. Murder of a Flower-Viewing Guest (Note: Remake from the tenth episode.) (July 16, 2017); Kanan Nakahara as Kunugi Shizuka, Yasufumi Hayashi as Nagasaki Shinsuke
- 32. Satsui wo Hakobu Kutsu (April 22, 2018); Jun Hashizume as Shimojo Tamotsu, Yōko Ishino as Shimojo Kanako
- 33. Garasu no Mihitsu (June 24, 2018); Tomoka Kurotani as Ayane
- 34. Koya no Shoumei (January 27, 2019); Reiko Takashima as Sekikawa Kyoko, Shunsuke Nakamura as Yamana Isao, Hideko Hara as Wakita Fuyue
- 35. Kishibo no Matsuei (November 3, 2019)
- 36. Yuki no Hotaru (January 7, 2020); Yoko Moriguchi as Eiko Izumida, Maki Miyamoto as Shimamura Masako, Ichirota Miyakawa as Izumida Yozo
- 37. Teinennonai Satsui (April 1, 2021); Toshinori Omi as Iba Teiji
- 38. Jugatsu no Tulip (December 22, 2022); Rie Mimura as Kitano Eiko, Sei Hiraizumi as Tashiro, Moemi Katayama as Kono Megumi
