= Shin Heike Monogatari (film) =

Shin Heike Monogatari 新・平家物語
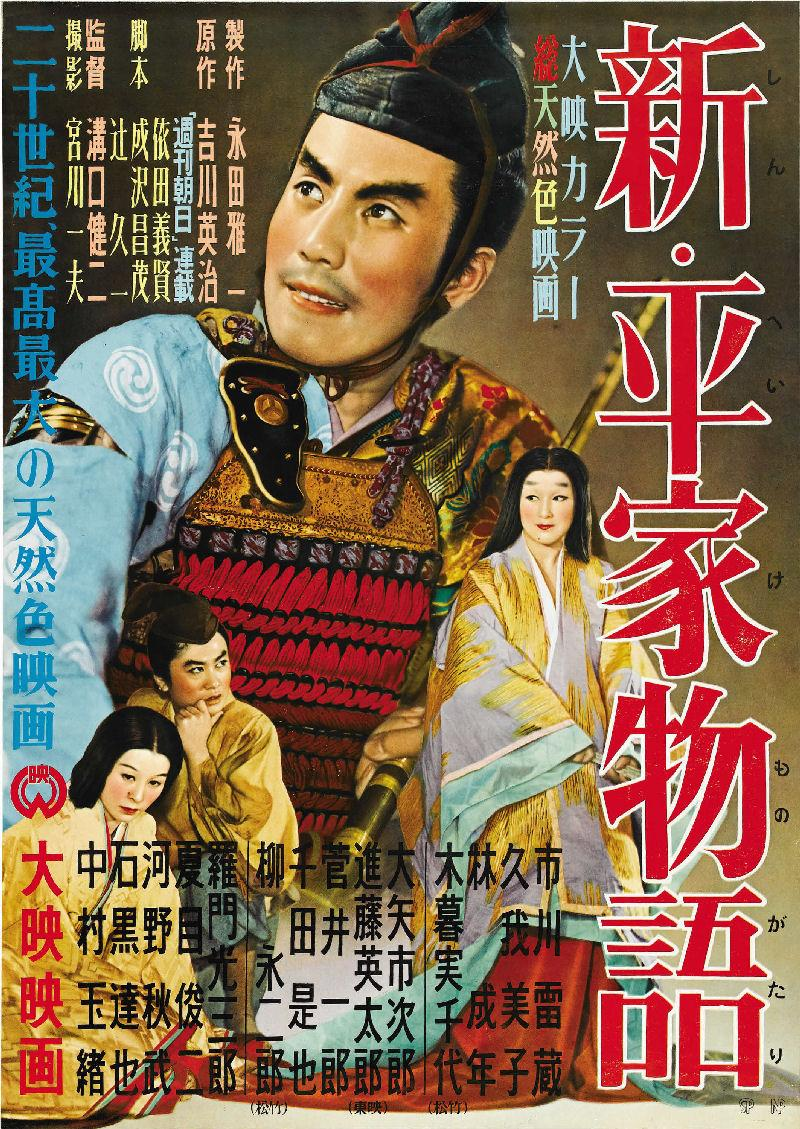
- Theatrical release poster
- Directed by: Kenji Mizoguchi
- Produced by: Masaichi Nagata
- Starring: Ichikawa Raizō VIII; Yoshiko Kuga; Michiyo Kogure
- Cinematography: Kazuo Miyagawa; Kôhei Sugiyama
- Edited by: Kanji Suganuma
- Music by: Fumio Hayasaka; Masaru Satô
- Distributed by: Daiei Film
- Release date: September 21, 1955 (Japan)
- Running time: 108 minutes
- Country: Japan
- Language: Japanese

Shin Heike Monogatari (新・平家物語; lit. "New Tale of the Heike") is a 1955 Japanese film directed by Kenji Mizoguchi. It is based on a prose version by Eiji Yoshikawa of a Japanese epic poem, The Tale of the Heike. (Note: Yoshikawa's historical novel, The Heike Story: A Modern Translation of the Classic Tale of Love and War (Shin Heike Monogatari), was published as a serial by Asahi Shimbun from 1950 to 1957.) It is Mizoguchi's second and last film in color, the other being Princess Yang Kwei Fei (Yōkihi) of the same year.

== Critical reaction ==
Ian Cameron, editor of the British film magazine, Movie, wrote in 1962: “The parallel between the historical action and the personal story gives Shin Heike Monogatari its particular beauty. Mizoguchi is arguably the greatest of directors. This is arguably his best film, and the best of all films.”

Kevin B Lee in a 2009 review for Slant Magazine found it a rather tentative attempt at color filmmaking and a self-conscious "prestige" picture, with Mizoguchi's usual themes present but at odds with the desire for spectacle and action of a samurai movie. After the American release of the film in 1964, Eugene Archer of The New York Times wrote that the plot was "subordinate to the decor".

Various critics have suggested that the film's setting at the end of the Heian period, a politically unstable time, and its concern with the transition of power reflect the situation of Post-occupation Japan, when the film was made in the 1950s.

== Cast ==
- Ichikawa Raizō VIII as Taira no Kiyomori
- Ichijirō Ōya as Taira no Tadamori, father of Kiyomori
- Yoshiko Kuga as Taira no Tokiko, concubine of Kiyomori
- Naritoshi Hayashi as Taira no Tokitada, brother of Tokiko
- Tamao Nakamura as Taira no Shigeko, sister of Tokiko
- Michiyo Kogure as Empress consort Fujiwara no Taishi
- Eijirō Yanagi as Retired Emperor Shirakawa
- Hisao Toake as Regent Fujiwara no Tadamichi
- Koreya Senda as Minister of the Left Fujiwara no Yorinaga, brother of Tadamichi
- Kunitarō Sawamura as Jokū
- Tatsuya Ishiguro as Taira no Tokinobu, father of Tokiko
