= Edo no Kaze =

- Also known as: 江戸の旋風
- Genre: Jidaigeki
- Directed by: Kazuo Mori; Tokuzō Tanaka; Kōzaburō Yoshimura
- Starring: Yūzō Kayama; Keiju Kobayashi; Shigeru Tsuyuguchi; Kunie Tanaka; Masaya Oki; Yasuaki Kurata; Eitaro Ozawa; Hiroya Morita; Taisaku Akino; Mie Hama; Takeo Chii; Ryō Ikebe
- Theme music composer: Katsuhisa Hattori
- Country of origin: Japan
- Original language: Japanese
- No. of series: 5
- No. of episodes: 210

Production
- Running time: 46 minutes (per episode)
- Production companies: Fuji TV, Toho Company

Original release
- Network: Fuji TV
- Release: April 1975 – August 28, 1981

Edo no Kaze (江戸の旋風) was a Japanese jidaigeki broadcast on prime-time television that ran from 1975 to 1981. Its lead star was Yūzō Kayama.

The series was based on Kazuo Shimada's novel of the same title. It became a popular broadcast, leading to the production of five series and a two-hour special.

== Characters ==
- Yūzō Kayama as Chiaki Joenosuke
- Keiju Kobayashi as Hayashida Magobei
- Minoru Chiaki as Hayami Shigetaro
- Yōsuke Kondō as Takase
- Masaaki Tsusaka as Sanai
- Ryō Ikebe as Nezu (first series, episodes 14-49)
- Kunie Tanaka as Yura (first series)
- Takeo Chii as Mihoki (first series)
- Mie Hama as Oyō (first series)
- Shigeru Tsuyuguchi as Shimazu Hanzō (series II-IV)
- Masaya Oki as Tachibana Seiichirō (Shin Edo no Kaze)
- Yasuaki Kurata as Todō Ken (Shin Edo no Kaze)
- Atsushi Watanabe as Higure Shinsaku (Shin Edo no Kaze)

== Seasons ==
- Edo no Kaze (1975–76) - 49 episodes
- Edo no Kaze II (1976–77) - 53 episodes
- Edo no Kaze III (1977–78) - 50 episodes
- Edo no Kaze IV (1978–79) - 26 episodes
- Shin Edo no Kaze (1980–81) - 31 episodes
- Edo no Kaze Special (1983) - two-hour special
