= Kill! =

- Film poster
- Directed by: Kihachi Okamoto
- Screenplay by: Akira Murao; Kihachi Okamoto
- Based on: Torideyama no jushichinichi by Shūgorō Yamamoto
- Produced by: Tomoyuki Tanaka
- Starring: Tatsuya Nakadai; Etsushi Takahashi; Atsuo Nakamura; Tadao Nakamaru
- Cinematography: Rokuro Nishigaki
- Edited by: Kihachi Okamoto; Yoshitami Kuroiwa
- Music by: Masaru Sato
- Production company: Tokyo Eiga
- Distributed by: Toho
- Release date: 8 June 1968 (Japan)
- Running time: 130 minutes
- Country: Japan

Kill! (Japanese: 斬る, Hepburn: Kiru) is a 1968 Japanese comedy-chambara film directed by Kihachi Okamoto. The film had a screenplay written by Akira Murao and Okamoto, and is based on the story Torideyama no jushichinichi (lit. '17 Days at Fort Mountain') in Yamamoto Shugoro zenshu (1964) by Shūgorō Yamamoto.

== Plot ==
Tatsuya Nakadai stars as Genta, a former samurai who became disillusioned with the samurai lifestyle and left it behind to become a wandering yakuza gang member. He meets Hanjirō Tabata (Etsushi Takahashi) a farmer who wants to become a samurai to escape his powerless existence. Genta and Tabata wind up on opposite sides of clan intrigue when seven members of a local clan assassinate their chancellor. Although the seven, led by Tetsutarō Oikawa (Naoko Kubo) rebelled with the support of their superior, Ayuzawa (Shigeru Kōyama), he turns on them and sends members of the clan to kill them as outlaws.

== Style ==
The film is a comically exaggerated exploration of what it is to be a samurai. The characters either give up samurai status or fight to attain it, and samurai are seen behaving both honorably and very badly. The film has a parodic tone, with numerous references to earlier samurai films.

== Cast ==
- Tatsuya Nakadai as Genta (Hyōdō Yagenta)
- Etsushi Takahashi as Hanji (Hanjirō Tabata)
- Yuriko Hoshi as Chino Kajii
- Naoko Kubo as Tetsutarō Oikawa
- Shigeru Kōyama as Ayuzawa
- Akira Kubo as Monnosuke Takei
- Seishirō Kuno as Daijirō Masataka
- Tadao Nakamaru as Shōda Magobei
- Eijirō Tōno as Moriuchi Hyōgo
- Shin Kishida as Jurota Arao
- Atsuo Nakamura as Tetsutaro
- Ryosuke Kagawa as Mizoguchi
- Takeo Chii as Yoshida Yaheiji
- Susumu Kurobe as Ayusawa Kinzaburo
- Isao Hashimoto as Konosuke Fujii
- Yoshio Tsuchiya as Matsuo Shinroku
- Hideyo Amamoto as Shimada Gendaiu

== Release ==
Kill! was released theatrically in Japan on 22 June 1968 where it was distributed by Toho. It was released in the United States by Frank lee International with English subtitles in August 1968.

== Reception ==
Along with Human Bullet and Judge and Jeopardy, Kill! gave art director Iwao Akune the award for Best Art Direction at the Mainichi Film Concours.
