= Samurai Assassin =

- Theatrical release poster
- Directed by: Kihachi Okamoto
- Screenplay by: Shinobu Hashimoto
- Based on: Samurai Japan by Jiromasa Gunji
- Produced by: Tomoyuki Tanaka; Reiji Miwa
- Starring: Toshiro Mifune; Keiju Kobayashi; Michiyo Aratama
- Cinematography: Hiroshi Murai
- Edited by: Yoshitami Kuroiwa
- Music by: Masaru Sato
- Production companies: Toho; Mifune Productions
- Distributed by: Toho
- Release date: January 3, 1965 (Japan)
- Running time: 121 minutes
- Country: Japan

Samurai Assassin (Japanese: 侍, Hepburn: Samurai) is a 1965 Japanese film directed by Kihachi Okamoto and starring Toshiro Mifune, Koshiro Matsumoto, Yūnosuke Itō, and Michiyo Aratama. It is set in 1860, immediately before the Meiji Restoration changed Japanese society forever by doing away with the castes in society and reducing the position of the samurai class.

== Plot summary ==
The film tells the story of Niiro Tsurichiyo (Mifune) as the illegitimate son of a powerful nobleman, and the way of his life that made him a swordfighter but also a social outcast. He joins forces with the multiple clans against the Lord of Hikone, Sir Ii Kamonnokami Naosuke. Ii is the right hand of the shogunate and brought upon himself the wrath of the Satsuma, Mito, and Choshuu provinces after making an unpopular choice for the appointment of the 14th shogunate. Many critics arose after the controversial appointment, and Ii initiated the Ansei Purge to quiet critics of his choices. This, in turn, led to an assassination plot hatched by the three provinces in order to remove Ii from his position of power. The shoguns also weeded out Ii's spies from the plot. The film is based on a novel, which in turn was inspired by the historical Sakuradamon incident, in which the feudal lord Ii Naosuke was assassinated outside the Sakurada Gate of Edo Castle in March 1860.

== Cast ==
- Toshiro Mifune - Tsuruchiyo Niiro
- Keiju Kobayashi - Einosuke Kurihara
- Michiyo Aratama - Okiku / Kikuhime
- Yūnosuke Itō - Kenmotsu Hoshino
- Eijirō Tōno - Masagoro Kisoya
- Tatsuyoshi Ehara - Ichigoro Hayama
- Tadao Nakamaru - Shigezo Inada
- Kaoru Yachigusa - Mitsu
- Haruko Sugimura - Tsuru
- Nami Tamura - Yae
- Shiro Otsuji - Kaname Kojima
- Toshio Kurosawa - Itamura Katsunoshin
- Yoshio Inaba - Keijiro Sumita
- Akihiko Hirata - Sohei Masui
- Hideyo Amamoto - Matazaburo Hagiwara
- Takashi Shimura - Narihisa Ichijō
- Matsumoto Kōshirō VIII - Ii Naosuke

== Production ==
Samurai Assassin was a production of both Toho and Mifune Productions. It is based on the book Samurai Japan by Jiromasa Gunji.

== Release ==
Samurai Assassin was released in Japan on January 3, 1965. The film was released in the United States on March 18, 1965 where it was distributed by Toho International. The film's title was apparently changed from Samurai to Samurai Assassin in the United States to avoid confusion with Hiroshi Inagaki's film Samurai (Miyamoto Musashi) from 1954.

== Reception ==
In a contemporary review, "Robe." of Variety declared that samurai film was not "superb" but "very good", noting that Toshiro Mifune and "the entire cast, particularly the men, give excellent portrayals" and that Hiroshi Murai's "crisp black and white photography is more effective in the outdoor, dead-of-winter panoramas and fight scenes"

== See also ==
- Hitokiri

== Footnotes ==
=== References ===
- Galbraith IV, Stuart (2008). The Toho Studios Story: A History and Complete Filmography. Scarecrow Press. ISBN 978-1461673743.
