= The Sword of Doom =

1966 Japanese film

- Theatrical release poster
- Directed by: Kihachi Okamoto
- Screenplay by: Shinobu Hashimoto
- Based on: Dai-bosatsu Tōge by Kaizan Nakazato
- Produced by: Sanezumi Fujimoto; Masayuki Sato; Kaneharu Minamizato
- Starring: Tatsuya Nakadai; Yūzō Kayama; Michiyo Aratama; Toshiro Mifune
- Cinematography: Hiroshi Murai
- Edited by: Yoshitami Kuroiwa
- Music by: Masaru Sato
- Production companies: Takarazuka Motion Picture Co.; Toho
- Distributed by: Toho
- Release date: 25 February 1966 (Japan)
- Running time: 119 minutes
- Country: Japan

The Sword of Doom, known in Japan as Dai-bosatsu Tōge (大菩薩峠; "Daibosatsu Pass"), is a 1966 Japanese jidaigeki film directed by Kihachi Okamoto and starring Tatsuya Nakadai. It is based on the serial novel of the same title by Kaizan Nakazato.

== Plot ==
The story follows the life of Ryunosuke Tsukue (Tatsuya Nakadai), an amoral samurai and a master swordsman with an unorthodox style. Ryunosuke is first seen when he kills an elderly Buddhist pilgrim whom he finds praying for death. He appears to have no feeling. Later, he kills an opponent in self-defense in a fencing competition that was intended to be non-lethal, but became a duel after he coerced his opponent's wife to have sex with him in exchange for throwing the match and allowing her husband to win. His opponent finds out about the affair prior to the match, and is shown giving his wife a notice of divorce. His rage at Ryunosuke during the match causes him to take an illegal lunging attack after the judge proclaims a draw, and Ryunosuke, the better swordsman, parries and kills him with one stroke of his bokken. Ryunosuke flees town after killing the man, and cuts down many of the dead opponent's clansmen who attack him as he is leaving. His opponent's ex-wife asks to go along with him.

Two years pass, and in order to make a living, Ryunosuke joins the Shinsengumi, a sort of semi-official police force made up of rōnin that supports the Tokugawa shogunate through murder and assassinations. Through all his interactions, whether killing a man or at home with his mistress and their baby son, Ryunosuke rarely shows any emotion.

Eventually Ryunosuke learns that the younger brother of the man he killed in the fencing match is looking for him, intent on revenge. He plans to meet this young man and kill him, but before the duel can take place, two events occur that shake his confidence. In a botched assassination attempt, he sees another master swordsman, Shimada Toranosuke (Toshiro Mifune), in action, and for the first time he doubts that his own skill is truly unbeatable. That same night, Ryunosuke's mistress, horrified by his unremitting evil, tries to kill him in his sleep. He kills her in the gardens, to the ominous cries of their sleeping child inside the house, and flees without keeping his appointment to duel with his pursuer. Later he rejoins the gang of assassins at an oiran house (courtesan brothel) in the Shimabara district of Kyoto. There, in a quiet (and he is told, haunted) room, he starts seeing the ghosts of all the people he has killed. Further, he is haunted by the words of Shimada: "The sword is the soul. Study the soul to know the sword. Evil mind, evil sword." The final blow comes when he realizes that the apprentice oiran sent to entertain him is the granddaughter of the pilgrim he murdered at the film's beginning.

With this realization, Ryunosuke appears to descend into complete insanity. He starts slashing at the shadows of the ghosts that surround him, and then begins attacking his fellow assassins, who seem to number in the hundreds. Ryunosuke kills dozens of gang members in the burning courtesan house as they gradually wear him down with what few wounds they can inflict. Finally it appears that Ryunosuke will surely be killed; bleeding, his face contorted in rage, he lurches forward, raises his sword one last time, and the film ends with a freeze-frame catching Ryunosuke in mid sword-slash.

== Cast ==
Actor	Role
Tatsuya Nakadai	Ryunosuke Tsukue
Yūzō Kayama	Hyoma Utsuki
Michiyo Aratama	Hama
Toshiro Mifune	Toranosuke Shimada
Yoko Naito	Omatsu
Kei Satō	Kamo Serizawa
Tadao Nakamaru	Isami Kondo
Akio Miyabe	Toshizō Hijikata
Ichiro Nakatani	Bunnojo Utsuki
Kō Nishimura	Shichibei, Omatsu's "uncle"
Hideyo Amamoto	Lord Shuzen Kamio
Kamatari Fujiwara	Omatsu's grandfather
Yasuzo Ogawa	Yohachi
Ryosuke Kagawa	Dansho Tsukue
Atsuko Kawaguchi	Okinu
Kunie Tanaka	Senkichi
Takamaru Sasaki	Ishinsai Nakamura
Akio Miyabe	Toshizo Ogata
Kinnosuke Takamatsu	old pilgrim

== Production ==
The Sword of Doom is an adaptation of Daibosatsu Toge (Daibosatsu, lit. ' Great Bodhisattva', Pass), a novel that has remained popular since its initial release in 1913, a year after the death of the Emperor Meiji, "the ruler who oversaw Japan's transition from hermetically sealed feudal state to modern nation." The novel originated from a newspaper serial, which appeared for three more decades; forty-one volumes were published before it was left uncompleted at the 1944 death of its author, Kaizan Nakazato. The novel had previously been adapted into a two part film by Hiroshi Inagaki in 1935. After World War II, it was remade multiple times, in three parts by Kunio Watanabe in 1953, in three parts by Tomu Uchida between 1957 and 1959, and in three parts by Kenji Misumi and Kazuo Mori in 1960 and 1961.

According to Geoffrey O'Brien, The Sword of Doom was an adaptation imposed on Kihachi Okamoto by Toho after the studio was dissatisfied with his film The Age of Assassins, which was completed in 1966 but only released in 1967. With "gaps and unresolved story lines" due to skipping some material, O'Brien noted that Okamoto's film might instead be called "Famous Scenes from 'Daibosatsu Toge'". He also suggested the film's final freeze-frame should be looked at as a pause while awaiting later installments that were never made, rather than an ending.

== Release ==
Sword of Doom was distributed by Toho and was released on February 25, 1966. The film was released with English subtitles in the United States by Toho International on February 25, 1966.

A proposed sequel was never produced.

== Reception ==
In a contemporary review, "Robe" of Variety found the film to have an "overlong unfolding story" that "rarely stops for a rest" and ultimately declared the film a "programmer".
