= Vengeance for Sale =

2002 film directed by Kihachi Okamoto

- Film poster
- Directed by: Kihachi Okamoto
- Screenplay by: Kihachi Okamoto
- Based on: Vengeance for Sale by Ikuta Daisuke (Kihachi Okamoto)
- Starring: Hiroyuki Sanada; Kyoka Suzuki; Keiju Kobayashi; Tatsuya Nakadai
- Cinematography: Yudai Katō
- Edited by: Shōzō Kawashima
- Music by: Yōsuke Yamashita
- Production companies: Nikkatsu; Fuji Television
- Distributed by: Toho
- Release date: February 16, 2002 (Japan)
- Running time: 88 minutes
- Country: Japan
- Language: Japanese

Vengeance for Sale (Japanese: 助太刀屋助六, Hepburn: Sukedachiya Sukeroku) is a 2002 Japanese jidaigeki film written and directed by Kihachi Okamoto.

Vengeance for Sale is a remake of the TV movie directed by Kihachi Okamoto in 1969, based on the manga written by Okamoto under the pen name "Daisuke Ikuta". It was the final film Okamoto directed. Vengeance for Sale was adapted into a kabuki in 2012.

Hiroyuki Sanada stars as Sukeroku, a yakuza who makes a living by aiding someone else's revenge.

== Cast ==
- Hiroyuki Sanada as Sukeroku
- Kyoka Suzuki as Osen
- Takehiro Murata as Tarō
- Shingo Tsurumi as Wakiya Shinkurō
- Tōru Kazama as Tsumaki Yunosuke
- Hirotarō Honda as Hotta
- Tomoi Tatsuhiko as Kurata
- Nana Yamamoto as Takeno
- Makoto Satō
- Naoto Takenaka
- Kyūsaku Shimada
- Hideyo Amamoto
- Kanzō Uni
- Hiroko Isayama
- Ittoku Kishibe as Sakakibara Oribe
- Kyōko Kishida as Otome
- Keijyu Kobayashi as Coffin craftsman
- Tatsuya Nakadai as Katakura Umetarō

== Other Credits ==
- Masaya Nakamra - Executive producer
- Yoshinobu Nishioka - Art director

== Honors ==
=== Mainichi Film Awards ===
- Won: Best Leading Actor - Hiroyuki Sanada.
