= The Age of Assassins =

- Theatrical release poster
- Directed by: Kihachi Okamoto
- Starring: Tatsuya Nakadai; Reiko Dan; Hideo Sunazuka; Hideyo Amamoto; Keiichi Taki
- Cinematography: Rokuro Nishigaki
- Edited by: Yoshitami Kuroiwa
- Music by: Masaru Sato
- Production company: Toho
- Distributed by: Toho
- Release date: 4 February 1967 (Japan)
- Running time: 99 minutes
- Country: Japan
- Language: Japanese

The Age of Assassins (Japanese: 殺人狂時代, Hepburn: Satsujinkyō jidai) is a 1967 Japanese film directed by Kihachi Okamoto.

== Plot ==
A young college instructor named Shinji Kikyo returns home one day to find himself the target of a mad assassin. Surviving somewhat miraculously, he fends off other assassins and, with the help of the reporter Keiko Tsurumaki and the car mechanic Bill Otomo, eventually discovers that a "population control" association is really an assassination squad led by Shogo Mizorogi, who has been training patients in a mental asylum to become killers. Along the way, it starts to appear that Shinji may not be the mild-mannered academic he seemed at first, but a well-trained secret agent.

== Cast ==
Tatsuya Nakadai	Shinji Kikyo
Reiko Dan	Keiko Tsurumaki
Hideo Sunazuka	Bill Otomo
Hideyo Amamoto	Shogo Mizorogi
Keiichi Taki	Ikeno
Seishirô Kuno	Man with crutch
Tatsuyoshi Ehara	Aochi (as Tatsuya Ebara)
Yasuzō Ogawa	Mabuchi
Atsuko Kawaguchi	Yumie Komatsu
Wataru Ōmae	Oba-Q
Shin Ibuki	Atom
Hiroshi Hasegawa	Solan
Masaya Nihei	Pappy

== Release ==
The Age of Assassins was released in Japan on February 4, 1967. The film was released in the United States by Toho International with an international title of Epoch of Murder Madness in 1967.

== Reception ==
The critic Chris Desjardins has written that "Age of Assassins is another sharp-edged lampoon that works just as well as an action film, and compares favorably with such other brilliant, tongue-in-cheek mod sixties masterpieces as Elio Petri's The Tenth Victim and Seijun Suzuki's Branded to Kill."
