= Yūnosuke Itō =

Japanese actor (1919–1980)

- Yūnosuke Itō in Kobayashi's I Will Buy You (1956)
- Born: 3 August 1919; Tokyo, Japan
- Died: 11 March 1980 (aged 60)
- Occupation: Actor
- Years active: 1924–1979

Yūnosuke Itō (伊藤 雄之助, Itō Yūnosuke; 3 August 1919 – 11 March 1980) was a Japanese film actor. He appeared in more than ninety films from 1947 to 1979.

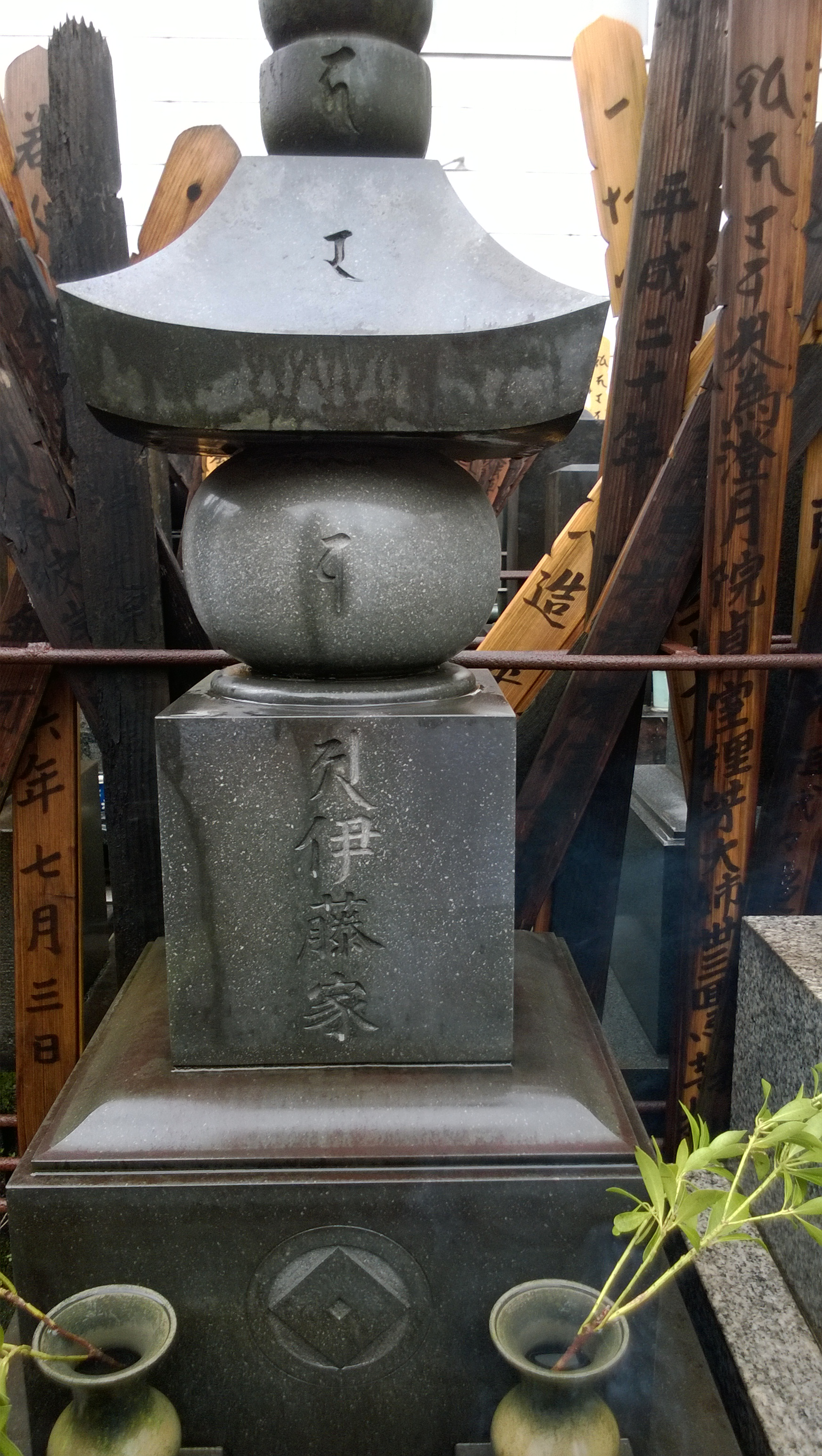
Grave of Ito Yunosuke at Saikoji Temple, Chitose, Tokyo

== Career ==
Itō made his film debut at Toho in 1946, and although mostly a prominent supporting actor—playing memorable figures such as the novelist in Akira Kurosawa's Ikiru—he also was cast in leading roles such as Kon Ichikawa's Mr. Pu. He is acclaimed as "one of the...extremely talented character actors who populated Japanese movies in [the Shōwa] era, playing a broad range of roles."

Itō received the 1962 Blue Ribbon Award for Best Supporting Actor for his dual role in the seminal ninja film Shinobi no Mono. Film scholar Stuart Galbraith IV has noted that the "horse-faced actor...was a real chameleon, despite his instantly recognizable, distinctive features...[and] gives what may be the performance of his career [as] one of the all-time great Japanese movie villains.

The son of kabuki actor Sawamura Sōnosuke I (1886-1924), Itō was the brother of actor Sōnosuke Sawamura (1918-1978), who was born Keinosuke Itō and took the name Sawamura Sōnosuke II when their father died, appearing on stage until the 1950s when he also became a TV and film actor, though never achieving his younger brother's renown.

Itō penned a memoir in 1968 in which he recounted his difficult path to fame, titled Radish Actor (a term of disdain for hammy performers). In 1977, he was urged to record the wistful song "Square Box" by its lyricist, Haruka Homura. Released as a single by Warner Records, a planned follow-up LP was never recorded, as Itō died while practicing the several songs Homura had written for it.

== Legacy ==
In 2008, Itō was one of the actors commemorated in the Seven Supporting Characters film festival held at the now-defunct Cinema Artone in Tokyo's Shimokitazawa entertainment district.

Tokyo's arthouse theatre Laputa Asagaya curated a 30-film retrospective in 2011 titled Great Character Actor of the Century: Fantastic Yūnosuke Itō.

In July 2019, Tokyo's Cinemavera Shibuya celebrated the 100th anniversary of his birth by screening 11 of his films in a shared festival honoring Itō and actor Kō Nishimura.

A character designed as a caricature of Itō is regularly featured in the cat-oriented manga Mon-chan and Me, published in Fusosha's popular webzine Joshi Spa! (Women's Spa!).

== Selected filmography ==
=== Films ===
Year	Title	Role	Director	Notes
1949	Stray Dog	Manager of Bluebird Theatre	Akira Kurosawa	first collaboration with Kurosawa
1952	Ikiru	Novelist	Akira Kurosawa	
1953	The Thick-Walled Room		Masaki Kobayashi	released 1956
1955	Keisatsu Nikki		Seiji Hisamatsu	
1956	I Will Buy You	Ippei Kyuki	Masaki Kobayashi	
1957	Yellow Crow	Ichirō Yoshida	Heinosuke Gosho	
1958	Giants and Toys	Junji Harukawa	Yasuzo Masumura	
1958	The Ballad of Narayama	Matayan's son	Keisuke Kinoshita	
1962	Sanjuro	Mutsuta	Akira Kurosawa	
1962	The Graceful Brute	Tokizō Maeda	Yuzo Kawashima	
1963	Kanto Wanderer	Okaru-Hachi	Seijun Suzuki	
1963	High and Low	Baba	Akira Kurosawa	
1965	Samurai Assassin	Kenmotsu Hoshino	Kihachi Okamoto	
1967	The Doctor's Wife	Seishu's father	Yasuzo Masumura	
1967	Japan's Longest Day	Toshio Nonaka	Kihachi Okamoto	
1968	The Human Bullet	Ship captain	Kihachi Okamoto	
1972	Lone Wolf and Cub: Sword of Vengeance	Retsudō Yagyū	Kenji Misumi	
1979	Taiyō o Nusunda Otoko	Bus hijacker	Kazuhiko Hasegawa	

=== Television ===
Year	Title	Role	Network	Notes
1973	Kunitori Monogatari		NHK	Taiga drama
