= Minori Terada =

Japanese voice artist and actor (1942–2024)

- 寺田 農
- Born: November 7, 1942; Tokyo, Japan
- Died: March 14, 2024 (aged 81)
- Occupation: Actor
- Years active: 1961–2024
- Spouse: Noriko Takahashi (m. 1970; div. 2006)

Minori Terada (Japanese: 寺田 農, Hepburn: Terada Minori; November 7, 1942 – March 14, 2024) was a Japanese actor and voice artist.

== Life and career ==
Terada was born in Tokyo, as the first son of Masaaki Terada, a famous painter. In 1961, he began to work as an actor.

Terada was known for his roles as villains, including Alien Metron in Ultraman Max and Colonel Muska in Castle in the Sky. He was also the narrator for several television dramas, documents, and films.

Terada loved reading. He died of lung cancer on March 14, 2024.

== Filmography ==
=== Film ===
Year	Title	Role	Director	Notes
1968	The Human Bullet	Him	Kihachi Okamoto	Lead role
1970	Zatoichi Meets Yojimbo	Togashi Yasuie	Kihachi Okamoto	
1973	Tsugaru Folk Song	Yutaka	Kōichi Saitō	
1978	The Fall of Ako Castle	Ōtaka Gengo	Kinji Fukasaku	
1981	Eijanaika	Ijūin	Shohei Imamura	
1981	Station	Rikiishi	Yasuo Furuhata	
1982	Sailor Suit and Machine Gun	Hagiwara	Shinji Sōmai	
1983	The Highest Honor	Captain Uno	Peter Maxwell/Seiji Maruyama	
1983	Legend of the Eight Samurai	Inumura Daikaku Masanori	Kinji Fukasaku	
1985	Love Hotel	Tetsuro Muraki	Shinji Sōmai	
1985	Typhoon Club	Ken's father	Shinji Sōmai	
1986	Castle in the Sky	Colonel Muska	Hayao Miyazaki	Voice role
1988	Tokyo: The Last Megalopolis	Masatoshi Ōkōchi	Akio Jissoji	
1988	Ureshi Hazukashi Monogatari	Yusuke Mikuni	Ureshi Hazukashi Monogatari	
1990	Ultra Q The Movie: Legend of the Stars	Yamane	Akio Jissoji	
1991	Rainbow Kids	narrator	Kihachi Okamoto	
1995	Maborosi		Hirokazu Koreeda	
1998	Murder on D Street	Shūhei Akimura	Akio Jissoji	
1998	Pride	Mamoru Shigemitsu	Shunya Itō	
2001	Hush!	Asako's father	Ryōsuke Hashiguchi	
2003	Dragon Head	Andō	George Iida	
2005	Hasami Otoko		Toshiharu Ikeda	
2005	Rampo Noir (segment "Kagami jigoku")	Inspector Namikoshi	Akio Jissoji	
2006	Nihon Igai Zenbu Chinbotsu	Dr. Tadokoro	Minoru Kawasaki	
2007	Unfair: The Movie	Superintendent General	Yoshinori Kobayashi	
2008	The Truth about Nanjing	Kōki Hirota	Satoru Mizushima	
2008	Gururi no koto	Eiichi	Ryōsuke Hashiguchi	
2009	Kamen Rider × Kamen Rider W & Decade: Movie War 2010	Ryubei Sonozaki	Ryuta Tasaki	
2010	Kamen Rider W Forever: A to Z/The Gaia Memories of Fate	Ryubei Sonozaki	Koichi Sakamoto	
2018	We Make Antiques!		Masaharu Take	
2020	Howling Village		Takashi Shimizu	
2021	Nobutora	Takeda Nobutora	Shusuke Kaneko	Lead role
2021	Inori		Katsuya Matsumura	
2022	Blue Thermal	Aonagi's director	Masaki Tachibana	Voice role
TBA	Shasen Henkō		Hiroshi Akabane	

=== Television ===
Year	Title	Role	Network	Notes
1971	Daichūshingura	Katsuta Shinzaemon	NET	
1975, 1978	Ōoka Echizen	Yatarō, Kinji	TBS	
1976	Kaze to Kumo to Niji to	Fujiwara no Masatsune	NHK	Taiga drama
1978, 1984	Taiyō ni Hoero!	Ichiki, Tajima	NTV	
1983	Tokugawa Ieyasu	Akechi Mitsuhide	NHK	Taiga drama
1987	Dokuganryū Masamune	Ōuchi Sadatsuna	NHK	Taiga drama
1992	Nobunaga ~King of Zipangu	Azai Hisamasa	NHK	Taiga drama
1997	Ultraman Tiga	Masachika Nezu (ep. 32), Miyagawa (ep. 40)	MBS	Tokusatsu
1998	Ultraman Dyna	Sensei (ep. 37)	MBS	Tokusatsu
2000	Aoi Tokugawa Sandai	Nijō Akizane	NHK	Taiga drama
2001	Hero	Watanuki	Fuji TV	
2003	Musashi	Kakubei Iwama	NHK	Taiga drama
2004	Part-Time Detective 2	Shutaro Fujie (藤江修太郎)	TV Tokyo	
2004	Ultra Q: Dark Fantasy	Taro Makoto	TX	Tokusatsu
2005	Ultraman Max	Alien Metron	CBC	Tokusatsu
2005	Dragon Zakura	Ryūzaburō Akutayama	TBS	
2009–2010	Kamen Rider W	Ryubei Sonozaki/Terror Dopant	TV Asahi	Tokusatsu
2011	Gō	Azai Hisamasa	NHK	Taiga drama
2017	Ultraman Geed	Sui Asakura (ep. 12)	TV Tokyo	Tokusatsu
2023–2024	Ultraman Blazar	Yu Dobashi (ep. 14, 18–19, 24–25)	TV Tokyo	Tokusatsu
2024	Sunny	Sticky (S. 1 ep. 4)	Apple TV	Drama

=== Original video animation (OVA) ===
- Wild 7 (1994) - Masaru Kusanami

=== Dubbing ===
- Blade Runner (1986 TBS edition) – Roy Batty (Rutger Hauer)
- Cat People (1985 Fuji TV edition) – Paul Gallier (Malcolm McDowell)
- Centennial – Jacques Pasquinel (Stephen McHattie)
- Gandhi (1987 Fuji TV edition) – Mahatma Gandhi (Ben Kingsley)
- Shōgun – Father Martin Alvito (Damien Thomas)
- Wanted Dead or Alive – Josh Randall (Steve McQueen)

=== Narration ===
- Homura Tatsu (1993 NHK Taiga drama)

== Awards and prizes ==
Year	Award	Category	Title	Result
1968	23rd Mainichi Film Award	Best Actor	The Human Bullet	Won
