= Hitomi Yamaguchi =

Japanese writer (1923–1995)

- Born: 3 November 1923; Tokyo, Japan
- Died: August 30, 1995 (aged 71); Kunitachi, Tokyo, Japan
- Occupation: Writer
- Writing career
- Genres: novels, essays

Hitomi Yamaguchi (山口 瞳, Yamaguchi Hitomi; November 3, 1923 – August 30, 1995) was a novelist and essayist in Shōwa period Japan.

== Early life ==
Yamaguchi was born in the Azabu district of Tokyo to a working-class family. He was forced to support himself through college, attending the Kokugakuin University. After graduation, he went to work for the publishing company Kawade Shobō, but that company went bankrupt a couple of years later. He then found employment as the editor of a wine magazine published by Kotobukiya (the forerunner of Suntory); his colleagues at the same magazine included Kaikō Ken and Yanagihara Ryōhei. The advertising campaign he mounted popularized Hawaii as a tourist destination as well as promoting Suntory whiskey.

== Literary career ==
Yamaguchi's true literary career started in 1954, when he began contributing works to the magazine of literary criticism, Gendai Hyoron ("Contemporary Criticism").

Yamaguchi won the 1963 Naoki Prize for his novel, Eburi Man shi no yūga na seikatsu (江分利満氏の優雅な生活) ("The Refined Lifestyle of Mr. Everyman"), which appeared serialized in the women's monthly magazine, Fujin Gahō, from 1961 to 1962. This story about an average white-collar worker in Tokyo set the tone for many of his future works, which mock the new affluence of urban society in the 1960s, in contrast to the bitter war and post-war period. The novel was adapted into a film, The Elegant Life of Mr. Everyman, directed by Kihachi Okamoto.

Other noted works are: Majime ningen ("A Serious Person"), Izakaya Choji, Ketsu zoku ("Blood Relations"), Kazoku (Family) and Waga machi ("Our Town"). Nanjamonja is a humorous account of travels around Japan.

Yamaguchi also wrote a biography on Yoshino Hideo, in which he describes his own experiences during the period he lived in Kamakura, in the house next door to Kawabata Yasunari from 1945 to 1948. During his time in Kamakura, he attended the Kamakura Academia, where his teachers included the philosopher and science historian, Saigusa Hiroto, the tanka poet, Yoshino Hideo, and the novelist and poet, Takami Jun. After that, he moved to Kunitachi, in the outskirts of Tokyo.

Dansei jishin ("Man Himself"), a series of witty essays about the joys and sorrows of everyday life, was serialized in the weekly magazine, Shukan Shincho, from 1963 until his death in 1995 for a total of 1,614 episodes.

Yamaguchi was an amateur shogi player and published a book Ketsurui jūban shōbu (血涙十番勝負) chronicling his games against professional players fought with a rook handicap (hisha ochi) advantage. His opponents included Yasuharu Ōyama, Makoto Nakahara, Kunio Yonenaga, among others. (Note: The pro players plays without the hisha, which has the same move rules as rook, but each player only has one rook piece at the start of a regular evenly-matched sbogi game.)

Yamaguchi died in 1995. His grave is in Uraga, Kanagawa.

== See also ==
- Japanese literature
- List of Japanese authors
