= Maiko Kawakami =

Japanese actress (born 1966)

- 川上 麻衣子
- Born: Maiko Kawakami; February 5, 1966 (age 60); Stockholm, Sweden
- Occupation: Actress
- Years active: 1980–present
- Known for: Kinpachi-sensei; Ureshi Hazukashi Monogatari
- Height: 1.62 m (5 ft 4 in)

Maiko Kawakami (川上 麻衣子, Kawakami Maiko; born February 5, 1966) is a Japanese actress who has starred in numerous movies and TV serials. She is a graduate of Keio University through distance education.

== Biography ==
Maiko debuted on an NHK drama titled Kizuna. In 1980, she starred in the second Kinpachi-sensei series. The following year, she released a J-pop single, Byakuya no sedai, as a Japanese idol. She married her junior-high sweetheart in 1996, but was divorced in 2000.

Kawakami is perhaps best known for her role in the 1988 Sesame Street TV special Big Bird in Japan. She was also a guest judge on the Japanese version of Iron Chef. In the tokusatsu series Ultraman Ginga, she portrayed the role of Tomomi Kuroki.

== Filmography ==
=== Television ===
- Kinpachi-sensei (1980–2011), Yaeko Sakoda
- Hideyoshi (1996), Okatsu

=== Film ===
- Violent Cop (1989), Akari
- Hatsukoi Geinin (2025), Midori Sato
- Mentor (2026), Takumi's mother
