= East Meets West (1995 film) =

1995 film

- Film poster
- Directed by: Kihachi Okamoto
- Written by: Kihachi Okamoto
- Produced by: Mineko Okamoto; Yoshihisa Nakagawa; Simon Tse; Bradley Hong; Buddy Enright
- Starring: Christopher Mayer; Hiroyuki Sanada; Tatsuya Nakadai; Naoto Takenaka; Ittoku Kishibe
- Cinematography: Yudai Kato
- Edited by: Akimasa Kawashima
- Music by: Masaru Sato
- Distributed by: Shochiku
- Release date: August 12, 1995 (Japan)
- Country: Japan
- Language: Japanese

East Meets West is a 1995 Japanese Western film written and directed by Kihachi Okamoto.

== Plot ==
The story, set in the year 1860, begins with an old man in the desert. Two signs are shown: one marked East, the other West.

Japan's government has sent men on a mission to San Francisco. In San Francisco, the Japanese are surprised by American culture.

One American, Gus Taylor, and his gang steal all the gold from the mission and make their way into the desert. One of the samurai on the mission chases after the gang into the desert. He is joined by a young American boy, Sam, whose father was killed by the gang leader. The group picks up a variety of people along the way to New Mexico.

The Japanese and the Americans on the trip share parts of their cultures with each other. The group of vigilantes eventually makes it to New Mexico and finds the gang. They take back their stolen gold and return to San Francisco.

== Cast ==
- Christopher Mayer as Gus Taylor
- Hiroyuki Sanada as Kamijo Kenkichi
- Scott Bachicha as Sam
- Tatsuya Nakadai as Katsu Kaishū
- Naoto Takenaka as Tommy, Tamejiro
- Ittoku Kishibe as John Manjiro
- Richard Nason as Hutch
- Angelique Midthunder as Nantai (as Angelique Roehm)
- Etsushi Takahashi as Kimura
- Jay Kerr as Hardy
- David Midthunder as Red Hair
- Hideyo Amamoto as Oguri Kozukenosuke

== Production ==
- Yoshinobu Nishioka - Art director
