= Masahiro Kishimoto =

Japanese cinematographer (born 1946)

- 岸本 正広
- Born: October 10, 1946 (age 79); Tokyo, Japan
- Occupation: Cinematographer
- Years active: 1965–2002
- Employer: Toho

Masahiro Kishimoto (岸本 正広, Kishimoto Masahiro; born October 10, 1946) is a Japanese retired cinematographer. He is best known for his work as director of photography on several entries in the Godzilla franchise. Kishimoto was also nominated for Best Cinematography at the Japan Academy Film Prize in 1992 for Rainbow Kids (1991).

== Life and career ==
Kishimoto was born on October 10, 1946, in Tokyo, Japan. After graduating from Tokyo Metropolitan Minato High School in 1965, Kishimoto joined Toho. Starting with the film Ironfinger (1965), he worked on numerous productions as an assistant cinematographer. He made his debut as a full cinematographer (director of photography) in 1982 with the film Lake of Illusions.

Kishimoto frequently collaborated with newcomer directors or those he had not previously worked with. He was known for always considering how best to respond to a director's requests and vision. His most prominent works include several films in the Godzilla franchise during the Heisei and Millennium eras, such as Godzilla vs. Mothra (1992), Godzilla vs. SpaceGodzilla (1994), Godzilla vs. Megaguirus (2000), Godzilla, Mothra and King Ghidorah: Giant Monsters All-Out Attack (2001), and Godzilla Against Mechagodzilla (2002), the latter being his final credit.

Other notable credits include Mount Hakkoda (1977), Virus (1980), Station (1981) as assistant cinematographer, and Hiruko the Goblin (1991) and various dramatic and genre films. In 1992, he was nominated for the Outstanding Cinematography award at the 15th Japan Academy Film Prize for his work on Rainbow Kids (1991). He has since retired from the film industry and maintains a low public profile.

== Filmography ==
=== Assistant cinematographer ===
- Ironfinger (1965)
- Operation Crazy (1966)
- How to be the Worst of Office Workers (1968)
- Toshigoro (1968)
- Bullet Wound (1969)
- Rebel Against Glory (1970)
- Take Care, Red Riding Hood (1970)
- Outstanding High School Girl: 16 Years Old and Feeling It (1970)
- The Way a Man Should Live (1970)
- Yuhi-kun's Salaryman Escape Plan (1971)
- Comedy: Love and Justice Among Cheaters (1974)
- Okita Sōji (1974)
- Kokuso sezu (1975)
- Go for It! Young Guy (1975)
- Hatsukoi (1975)
- Between Wife and Woman (1976)
- Mount Hakkoda (1977)
- Sugata Sanshirō (1977)
- Afterglow (1978)
- Phoenix (1978)
- Murder in the Dollhouse (1979)
- Virus (1980)
- Station (1981)

=== Cinematographer ===
- Lake of Illusions (1982)
- Love Forever (1983)
- Nogare no Machi (1983)
- Yoake no Runner (1983)
- I Want To Live Once More: Shinjuku Bus Fire Incident (1985)
- Caribe: Symphony of Love (1985)
- Nineteen (1987)
- Crane (1988)
- Yawara! (1989)
- Rainbow Kids (1991)
- Hiruko the Goblin (1991)
- Godzilla vs. Mothra (1992)
- Godzilla vs. SpaceGodzilla (1994)
- My Secret Cache (1997)
- Godzilla vs. Megaguirus (2000)
- Godzilla, Mothra and King Ghidorah: Giant Monsters All-Out Attack (2001)
- Godzilla Against Mechagodzilla (2002)
