= Horse (1941 film) =

1941 Japanese film by Kajirō Yamamoto

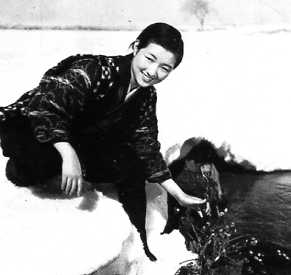
- Hideko Takamine as Ine
- Directed by: Kajirō Yamamoto
- Written by: Kajirō Yamamoto
- Starring: Hideko Takamine
- Cinematography: Takeo Itō; Hiromitsu Karasawa; Akira Mimura; Hiroshi Suzuki
- Edited by: Toshio Goto
- Music by: Shigeaki Kitamura
- Production company: Toho
- Distributed by: Toho
- Release date: 11 March 1941 (Japan)
- Running time: 129 minutes
- Country: Japan
- Language: Japanese

Horse (Japanese: 馬, Hepburn: Uma) is a 1941 black-and-white Japanese drama film written and directed by Kajirō Yamamoto and starring Hideko Takamine. It is now best known for being the last film that Akira Kurosawa worked on before starting his own directorial career.

== Plot ==
A young girl named Ine from a poor village family wants nothing more than to own a horse. Her family soon takes in a pregnant mare which they have signed on to care for over the winter. Financial troubles push the family towards the edge of ruin and neither they nor the horse have much to eat. The horse becomes very ill and the vet determines only grass will save it. Ine walks many miles through the snow to a hot spring where grass grows year-round and saves the horse's life. That spring gives birth to a colt and it looks as if Ine will finally have her horse. But when the colt is grown, the government orders it auctioned and sold to the army, as unpaid bills force the family to sell the colt. Ine takes a job in a mill to save money to buy her horse back. On the day of the auction, she is outbid and cries as the horse is led away for the last time.

== Cast ==
- Hideko Takamine – Ine Onoda
- Kamatari Fujiwara – Jinjiro Onoda, Ine's father
- Chieko Takehisa – Saku Onoda, Ine's mother
- Kaoru Futaba – Ei, Ine's grandmother
- Takeshi Hirata – Toyokazu Onoda, Ine's older brother
- Toshio Hosoi – Kinjiro Onoda, Ine's younger brother
- Setsuko Ichikawa – Tsuru Onoda, Ine's little sister
- Sadao Maruyama – Mr. Yamashita, the teacher
- Sadako Sawamura – Kikuko Yamashita, the teacher's wife
- Sōji Kiyokawa – Mr. Sakamoto

== Production ==
Horse was written and directed by Kajirō Yamamoto. Akira Kurosawa is credited as the film's production coordinator, but in his autobiography, Something Like an Autobiography, Kurosawa likened his actual role to "first assistant director". It is the last film Kurosawa worked on as an assistant before starting his own directing career. The film took three years to plan and a year to film. Yamamoto later stated in an interview that his then-assistant Kurosawa "took responsibility for second unit work" while Yamamoto worked on a musical comedy in Tokyo. Kurosawa wrote in his autobiography that he, in addition to his position as first assistant and second unit director, co-scripted and edited the film. The final shot of Uma has been compared to the final shot of Kurosawa's second film, The Most Beautiful, which also emphasizes the personal sacrifice of a young woman during wartime.
