= The Human Bullet =

1968 Japanese film

- DVD cover
- Directed by: Kihachi Okamoto
- Written by: Kihachi Okamoto
- Produced by: Kazuo Baba
- Starring: Minori Terada; Naoko Otani; Hideyo Amamoto; Chishū Ryū
- Narrated by: Tatsuya Nakadai
- Cinematography: Hiroshi Murai
- Edited by: Yoshihiro Araki
- Music by: Masaru Sato
- Production companies: Art Theatre Guild; The Human Bullet Production Association
- Distributed by: Art Theatre Guild
- Release date: 12 October 1968 (Japan)
- Running time: 116 minutes
- Country: Japan
- Language: Japanese

The Human Bullet (Japanese: 肉弾, Hepburn: Nikudan) is a 1968 Japanese satiric anti-war film about a soldier who becomes assigned to a suicide mission against the American forces during the late stage of World War II. It was written and directed by Kihachi Okamoto, based off his own wartime experiences.

== Plot ==
During the last days of the war, a nameless young cadet is assigned to a suicide mission, ordered to blow himself up with an ammunition crate under the expected enemy tanks. While awaiting the enemy's invasion, he makes the acquaintance of a young orphaned woman, who runs a brothel formerly owned by her parents, and two kid brothers. He falls in love with the young woman, who is later killed in an air raid, as is the elder of the brothers. Vowing revenge for the dead, he receives new orders from the deteriorating commanding staff, ordering him to manually steer a torpedo into the awaited enemy battleships. Twenty years after the war has ended, his skeletal remains float in an oil drum off the beach, his offscreen voice shouting "rabbit", the nickname he had given the girl. (Note: The nickname refers to the Year of the Rabbit, the year in which the girl was born.)

== Cast ==
- Minori Terada as him
- Naoko Otani as girl
- Chishū Ryū as bookstore owner
- Tanie Kitabayashi as bookstore owner's wife
- Shoichi Ozawa as Sergeant
- Kin Sugai as Sergeant's mistress
- Etsushi Takahashi as NCO
- Ichirō Nakatani as military policeman
- Kunie Tanaka as Captain
- Masumi Harukawa as woman in apron
- Yūnosuke Itō as ship captain
- Hideyo Amamoto as father

== Production ==
After negotiations with Toho Studios failed, Okamoto financed The Human Bullet himself, shooting it on 16mm film (to be later released in 35 mm format). Independent distribution and production company Art Theatre Guild acted as co-producer.

The film was based on Okamoto's own wartime experiences. As no film studio would provide funding, the director's wife, Mineko Okamoto, stepped up as producer. Working side-by-side, the couple painstakingly raised the necessary funds themselves, eventually managing to bring the production to fruition. It is said that Okamoto even mortgaged his own home to secure the production budget. He also commissioned Masaru Sato to compose the score; however, lacking the funds to book a recording studio, the music was reportedly recorded surreptitiously—squeezed in during the brief intervals between recording sessions for other films.

Naoko Otani, who was still a high school student at the time, agreed to appear nude in the film. "I don't consider it shameful at all," Ohtani remarked. "While I dislike being gawked at out of mere curiosity, when viewed within the context of the work as a whole, those shots are entirely meaningful." She also made bold statements regarding director Kihachi Okamoto—then in his mid-forties—for whom she had developed a deep admiration: "I have never met such a wonderful man. I always viewed him first and foremost as a magnificent human being, rather than simply as a director". She further stated, "Once I graduate from high school, I intend to join a Shingeki (modern theater) troupe. My appearance in this film was merely a preliminary reconnaissance for that purpose; I have no intention of acting in movies again".

== Awards ==
The Human Bullet received the 1968 Mainichi Film Awards for Best Direction, Best Actor (Minori Terada), Best Music and Best Art Direction (Isao Akune).
