= Pressure of Guilt =

- Directed by: Hiromichi Horikawa
- Screenplay by: Shinobu Hashimoto
- Produced by: Ichiro Sato; Hideyuki Shiino
- Starring: Keiju Kobayashi; Tatsuya Nakadai; Chikage Awashima; Mayumi Ozora
- Cinematography: Hiroshi Murai
- Music by: Toru Takemitsu
- Production company: Tokyo Eiga
- Distributed by: Toho
- Release date: 10 April 1963 (Japan)
- Running time: 113 minutes
- Country: Japan

Pressure of Guilt (白と黒, Shiro to Kuro; transl. "White and Black") is a 1963 Japanese drama film directed by Hiromichi Horikawa.

== Cast ==
- Keiju Kobayashi as Katsumi Ochiai
- Tatsuya Nakadai as Ichirô Hamano
- Nobuko Otowa as Tomoko Ochiai
- Mayumi Özora as Yuki Muramatsu
- Koreya Senda as Harumasa Munakata
- Eijirō Tōno as Miyamoto
- Eitarō Ozawa as Yoshioka
- Kō Nishimura as Hirao
- Kyū Sazanka as Iwasaki
- Masao Mishima as Muramatsu
- Tomo'o Nagai as Takahara
- Yoshio Inaba as Pathologist
- Jun Hamamura as Yano
- Hisashi Igawa as Shōkichi Wakida
- Chikage Awashima as Yasue Munakata
- Mitsuka Akiyoshi as Inn Servant
- Hiroko Itō as Barmaid A
- Kaneko Iwasaki as Fusako Ōi

== Release ==
Pressure of Guilt was released theatrically in Japan by Toho on April 10, 1963. The film was released in the United States by Toho International with English subtitles in January 1964.

== Reception ==
In a contemporary review, Tube of Variety wrote: "the story seems somewhat hokey and overly involved, it has been portrayed with force and conviction by a talented cast and directed with considerable cinematic flair".

== Accolades ==
In Japan, Keiju Kobayashi won the award for Best Actor at the Mainichi Film Concours for his work in this film and The Elegant Life of Mr. Everyman.
