= The Elegant Life of Mr. Everyman =

- Film poster
- Directed by: Kihachi Okamoto
- Screenplay by: Toshirō Ide
- Story by: Hitomi Yamaguchi
- Produced by: Sanezumi Fujimoto; Masakatsu Kaneko
- Starring: Keiju Kobayashi; Michiyo Aratama; Tatsuyoshi Ehara
- Cinematography: Hiroshi Murai
- Edited by: Yoshitami Kuroiwa
- Music by: Masaru Sato
- Production company: Toho
- Distributed by: Toho
- Release date: 16 November 1963 (Japan)
- Running time: 102 minutes
- Country: Japan
- Language: Japanese

The Elegant Life of Mr. Everyman (Japanese: 江分利満氏の優雅な生活, Hepburn: Eburiman-shi no yūgana seikatsu) is a 1963 Japanese satirical comedy film directed by Kihachi Okamoto. The screenplay by Toshiro Ide was based on the Naoki Prize winning novel by Hitomi Yamaguchi.

== Plot ==
Eburi, an advertising department employee, promises two women's magazine editors to write a masterpiece of a magazine article while drunk. Once he sobers up, he decides to write an article using his own life and his family's history as a basis. Addressing his father's profiteering during the Pacific War, Eburi reflects upon postwar Japan and the legacy of the militarist regime. After winning the Naoki Prize, he gets drunk with two colleagues, lamenting the fate of the many young men who had been seduced to go to war and died.

== Cast ==
- Keiju Kobayashi as Eburi
- Michiyo Aratama as Natsuko, his wife
- Eijirō Tōno as Meiji, his father
- Yuriko Hanabusa as Miyo, his mother
- Tatsuyoshi Ehara as Hane, his neighbor

== Production ==
The film was originally supposed to be directed by Yūzō Kawashima, but the job was passed on to Okamoto when Kawashima died.

== Accolades ==
Keiju Kobayashi won the best actor award at the Mainichi Film Awards for his performance in this film and in Pressure of Guilt.

== Legacy ==
The film was featured at the 2007 Berlin Film Festival as part of its Okamoto retrospective. The catalog wrote: "This masterpiece, overflowing with wisdom, represents the 'Kihachi touch'." The Japan Foundation also selected the film as part of its 2019 touring film program, stating that "Featuring animation and audacious editing, this idiosyncratic and inventive film is a timeless treatment of life in postwar Japan." A 35mm film print of the film is preserved in the collection of the National Film Archive of Japan.

== Bibliography ==
- Galbraith IV, Stuart (2008). The Toho Studios Story: A History and Complete Filmography. Scarecrow Press. ISBN 978-1461673743.
