= Ureshi Hazukashi Monogatari =

- Theatrical release poster
- Directed by: Yōichi Higashi
- Screenplay by: Yō Takeyama
- Based on: Ureshi Hazukashi Monogatari by George Akiyama
- Produced by: Kōji Chiba
- Starring: Maiko Kawakami; Minori Terada; Shūko Honami
- Cinematography: Koichi Kawakami
- Edited by: Keiko Ichihara
- Music by: Masaji Hosoi
- Distributed by: Nikkatsu
- Release date: March 19, 1988 (Japan)
- Running time: 89 minutes
- Country: Japan
- Language: Japanese

Ureshi Hazukashi Monogatari (うれしはずかし物語), also known as A Tale of Happiness and The Pursuit of Happiness, is a 1988 Japanese erotic comedy drama film directed by Yōichi Higashi. The film is based on a manga of the same name by George Akiyama. Nikkatsu released the film on March 19, 1988, in Japan.

== Premise ==
Yusuke Mikuni, a manager at a corporation, is tired of his domestic life. He buys a one-room apartment to gain space for himself. Later, he meets a young woman named Chako. The two come to an agreement: in exchange for Chako being allowed to live in Yusuke's apartment, once a week, they will meet for a sexual liaison.

== Cast ==
- Maiko Kawakami as Chako
- Minori Terada as Yusuke Mikuni
- Shūko Honami as Wakako Mikuni
- Hiroyuki Watari as Sotoyama
- Kaori Asō as Yasuko
- Junpei Kusami as Amemiya
- Kenji Mitamura as Nakahara
- Miho Mochida as Kasumi Mikuni
- Tetsu Sakuma as Funato
- Noriyuki Shimamura as Hiroshi Mikuni
- Kippei Shiina as Nakahara's subordinate
- Sakae Umezu as estate agent

== Awards ==
10th Yokohama Film Festival

- Won: Best Supporting Actress - Shūko Honami
