= Hiruko the Goblin =

1991 film

- Theatrical release poster
- Directed by: Shinya Tsukamoto
- Written by: Shinya Tsukamoto
- Story by: Koji Tsutsumi
- Based on: Yōkai Hunter by Daijiro Morohoshi
- Produced by: Toshiaki Nakazawa; Yasuhiro Hasegawa; Shin Yoneyama
- Starring: Kenji Sawada
- Cinematography: Masahiro Kishimoto
- Edited by: Yoshitami Kuroiwa; Shinya Tsukamoto
- Music by: Tatsushi Umegaki
- Production companies: Sedic; Wings; Shochiku-Fuji Company
- Distributed by: Shochiku-Fuji Company
- Release date: 11 May 1991 (Japan)
- Running time: 89 minutes
- Country: Japan
- Language: Japanese

Hiruko the Goblin (Japanese: 妖怪ハンター ヒルコ, Hepburn: Yōkai Hantā: Hiruko), also known as Yōkai Hunter: Hiruko, is a 1991 Japanese horror film directed by Shinya Tsukamoto and starring Kenji Sawada. It is based on a manga by Daijiro Morohoshi.

== Plot ==
Young and energetic archeologist Reijiro Hieda is discredited for advocating wild theories about the supernatural. A letter from his brother-in-law Takashi Yabe, a junior high school teacher, tells of his discovery of an ancient tomb built to seal a yōkai (evil spirit). Yabe and his student Reiko Tsukishima investigated the burial mound but mysteriously disappeared.

Hieda arrives in town to look into the matter and meets Masao, Yabe's son. Masao earlier searched for his father in the school and saw a returned Reiko at the schoolhouse, seemingly seducing his classmate Kono. Masao was afflicted with mysterious incidents where his back heats up, emits smoke and shows small blackened faces of the dead.

Masao and Hieda search the schoolhouse and find Kono, as well as his friends Aoi and Katagiri are horrifically murdered with a switchblade. The nephew and uncle pair initially suspects the janitor, Watanabe, who had tried to keep people away from the schoolhouse, but soon realize that the disembodied singing head of Reiko is the culprit.

Discovering Yabe's notebook, Hieda learns that the tomb sealed a yōkai named Hiruko. Believing Hiruko is behind the incidents, Hieda sets out to learn the spells to open and close the way into the burial mound sanctum. Watanabe, who had earlier cut the power lines to the schoolhouse, attacks the pair, though Masao successfully takes his gun in the struggle. Back at the schoolhouse again, the pair encounter Reiko, who now sports spider-legs. Watanabe attacks Hieda, while Reiko attacks Masao. After escaping from the schoolhouse, Reiko gains insect-like wings and the four have another scuffle, although Reiko escapes after being repelled by bug spray.

Watanabe explains that as a child, he knew Tatsuhiko Yabe, Masao's grandfather. Tatsuhiko also bore the scars of dead men's heads on his back, and somehow sealed the gate 60 years ago. He swore Watanabe to guard the schoolhouse after his death to prevent a recurrence of the tragedy. The group realizes that Masao's father reached the interior of the chamber, but was betrayed. The "crown" with which to seal Hiruko, a missing Yabe family treasure, had likely been taken by Takashi and was likely still in the sealed chamber. Watanabe, who had previously been attacked by Reiko, realizes he is being corrupted by her and commits suicide with his gun.

At the burial mound, Hieda uses a spell from the Kojiki to open the sealed chamber: the story of Izanagi and his wife Izanami, who was sealed away in a cave. Inside, the pair find the sealed yokai, the crown (which appears as a helmet), as well as Masao's father. The elder Yabe had become a spider-legged abomination as well. As the two escape, they find Reiko and her transformed victims blocking their exit - but the victims instead let them pass, enter the tomb, and hold off the others while Hieda uses the incantation to close the gate. The pair believe they have finished, but Reiko had somehow snuck onto Hieda's back, and she uses the opportunity to grab onto his face and influence him to open the gate again using memories of his dead wife. Masao, finding the helmet once again has three horns, uses the closing incantation again, this time sending the Hiruko-possessed Reiko back into the underworld.

== Cast ==
- Kenji Sawada as Reijirou Hieda
- Masaki Kudou as Masao Yabe
- Hideo Murota as Watanabe
- Naoto Takenaka as Takashi Yabe
- Megumi Ueno as Reiko Tsukishima

== Production ==
Production began in the summer of 1990. Financing was provided through the PFF Scholarship, which Tsukamoto had won with his previous film. Filming was split between the town of Asahi, Toyama and a Toho sound stage. Production was tense, with crew members complaining about having to work under a younger director, and Tsukamoto getting into a physical altercation with cast member Hideo Murota, who refused to follow his directions. The film went over budget near the end of production, requiring crew members to have to finish it for free.

== Release ==
The film was released in Japan on May 11, 1991. Shochiku handled the release and distribution of the film, heavily promoting it through expensive television and billboard advertisements. However, the film was a financial flop, and was critically panned. The film was released on Blu-ray in the west in early 2022, with Third Window Films handling the release in Europe, and Mondo Macabro handling the release in North America.

== Reception ==
In his book Horror and Science Fiction Film IV, Donald C Willis stated that Hiruko the Goblin was a variation of Bug, The Fly, Attack of the Crab Monsters and A Nightmare on Elm Street III, but "puts a fresh weird spin on each variation". Noting that "the film is situated amusingly between the comic, the creepy, the campy and Luis Buñuel."

== Notes ==
=== References ===
- Willis, Donald C. (1997). Horror and Science Fiction Films IV. Scarecrow Press. ISBN 0-8108-3055-8.
