= Monkey Sun =

1959 film directed by Kajirō Yamamoto

- Theatrical release poster

Japanese name
- Kanji: 孫悟空
- Directed by: Kajirō Yamamoto
- Screenplay by: Kajirō Yamamoto; Takeo Murata
- Based on: Journey to the West by Wu Cheng'en
- Produced by: Tomoyuki Tanaka
- Starring: Norihei Miki; Yū Fujiki; Shoichi Hirose; Hideyo Amamoto
- Cinematography: Hajime Koizumi
- Edited by: Yoshitami Kuroiwa
- Music by: Ikuma Dan
- Color process: Color
- Production company: Toho
- Distributed by: Toho
- Release date: 19 April 1959 (Japan)
- Running time: 98 minutes
- Country: Japan
- Language: Japanese

Monkey Sun (Japanese: 孫悟空, Hepburn: Son Gokū; lit. Sun Wukong) is a 1959 Japanese tokusatsu fantasy action film directed by Kajirō Yamamoto, with special effects by Eiji Tsuburaya. The film was based on Journey to the West written by Wu Cheng'en and was the second adaptation of the novel by Yamamoto and Tsuburaya, after 1940's Enoken's Sun Wukong. It has never been released in the United States or dubbed and subtitled in English.

== Plot ==
The tale unfolds in Chang'an, capital of China during the Tang dynasty. People are suffering and dying from floods, epidemics, and famine, and the Emperor believes he can save his country if he can obtain the holy script, San Tsang, from distant India. He discovers, however, that no one is willing to make the long journey because the roads to India are infested with savages and devils.

The Emperor has a dream in which a hermit appears and tells him that there is a brave boy, only 13 years old, by the name of Genjo who would be able to accomplish the mission. The Emperor summons the boy, gives him the name of San Tsang, after the name of the holy script, and sends him on the dangerous journey to India.

San Tsang is first attacked by a band of savages and barely escapes death. When he is resting from exhaustion on the summit of a mountain, he hears strange music and notices a ray of light shining on him. Then appears Pon, messager of the goddess of mercy, who leads him to a cave where Sun Wu Kong has been confined for 500 years. The Monkey King becomes San Tsang's first disciple to protect him on his long journey.

Later the duo are joined by Pa Chieh and Wu Ching. The four are attacked by devils and spiders disguised in various forms, but finally San Tsang and his faithful followers reach the top of a mountain where they see their destination, India. The morning sun is shining on the snow-covered Himalayas, and the sweet voice of Pon is heard from the valley below.

== Cast ==
- Norihei Miki as Sun Wukong
- Fukutaro Ichikawa as Tang Sanzang
- Nobuo Chiba as Zhu Bajie
- Zeko Nakamura as Sha Wujing
- Yū Fujiki as Swordsman Chikujin
- Shoichi Hirose as Native chief
- Hideyo Amamoto as Secretary-General
- Kaoru Yachigusa as Tsui Lan
- Reiko Dan as Pon
- Yoshio Kosugi as Devil King

== Release ==
Monkey Sun was distributed theatrically in Japan by Toho on April 19, 1959, as a double feature with I Want to Be a Shellfish. Kinema Club released the film on mail-order VHS in 1999; a DVD release by Toho followed in 2021.
