= Daijiro Morohoshi =

Japanese manga artist

- Born: Morohoshi Daijirō 諸星 大二郎; July 6, 1949 (age 77); Karuizawa, Nagano Prefecture, Japan
- Other names: Morohoshi Yoshikage 諸星 義影
- Occupations: Manga artist, illustrator, writer
- Years active: 1970–present
- Known for: Yōkai Hunter, Saiyū Yōenden
- Awards: Tezuka Osamu Cultural Prize (2000)

Daijiro Morohoshi (諸星 大二郎, Morohoshi Daijirō; born July 6, 1949, in Karuizawa, Nagano Prefecture, Japan) is a Japanese manga artist. He is well known for science fiction comics, allegorical comics and horror/mystery comics based on pseudohistory and folklore. The indirect influence by Cthulhu Mythos also appears here and there in his works.

== Biography ==
Morohoshi grew up in Adachi-ku, Tokyo. After graduating from high school, he worked for the Tokyo metropolitan government for three years.

In 1970, Morohoshi made his professional debut with his short story "Junko Kyōkatsu" (ジュン子・恐喝, Junko, blackmail) in COM. In 1974, his short story "Seibutsu Toshi" (生物都市, Bio City) was selected in the 7th Tezuka Award. His breakthrough came in the same year, when he started publishing the series Yōkai Hunter (妖怪ハンター, Demon Hunter) in Weekly Shōnen Jump. He published Ankoku Shinwa (暗黒神話, Dark Myth) and Kōshi Ankokuden (孔子暗黒伝, Dark Biography of Confucius) in the same magazine afterwards. In 1979, he published the Mud Men series in Monthly Shōnen Champion Zōkan.

In 1983, he published Saiyū Yōenden (西遊妖猿伝, Journey to the West: Monster monkey's Commentary) (The Monkey King and other Chinese Legends) based on Journey to the West in Futabasha's Super Action. This work won him the grand prize of the fourth Tezuka Osamu Cultural Prize in 2000.

== Style and themes ==
Morohoshi takes inspiration from ancient history, mythology and folklore, influenced by the essays of Tatsuhiko Shibusawa. Yōkai Hunter revolves around archeologists discovering strange incidents around Japan, Mad Men shows myths from Papua New Guinea clashing with modernity and Saiyū Yōenden is based on the classic Chinese fantasy novel Journey to the West.

His drawing style is inspired by Western artists such as Salvador Dalí, whom he cites as his favourite painter, but his work also includes references to Hieronymus Bosch, Francisco Goya and Giorgio de Chirico.

Morohoshi's style is perceived as unique in the manga industry. In a roundtable discussion between Morohoshi, Yukinobu Hoshino and Osamu Tezuka, Tezuka said that he could not imitate Morohoshi's painting. For this reason, manga critics have considered him to be part of a New Wave of manga artists in the late 1970s and early 1980s.

== Legacy ==
Morohoshi has been a key influence to two important anime directors of the 1980s and 1990s, Hayao Miyazaki and Hideaki Anno. Miyazaki mentioned that he was strongly influenced by Morohoshi. His 1997 film Princess Mononoke has references to Mud Men. When Kentaro Takekuma interviewed Miyazaki, he said that he actually wanted Morohoshi to draw Nausicaä of the Valley of the Wind. According to Toshio Okada, who was a former representative director of Gainax, Hideaki Anno always said that he wanted to apply the scene where a giant appeared in Morohoshi's "Kage no Machi" (影の街, Shadow Town) to his work, and his hope was realized in Neon Genesis Evangelion.

His style has inspired also musicians. Morohoshi's Mud Men triggered Haruomi Hosono of Yellow Magic Orchestra, and Hosono wrote "The Madmen" for the album Service. Hosono said that his production company misspelled "Mudmen" with "Madmen".

His work has gained some international attention since the 2000s. Manga of his have been translated into French and Spanish.

== Awards ==
Year	Nominee / work	Award	Result
1974	"Seibutsu Toshi"	The 7th Tezuka Award	Nominated
1992	Boku to Furio to Kōtei de	The excellence prize of The 21st Japan Cartoonists Association Award	Won
1992	Morokai Shii: Ikairoku	The excellence prize of The 21st Japan Cartoonists Association Award	Won
2000	Saiyū Yōenden	The grand prize of the 4th Tezuka Osamu Cultural Prize	Won
2008	Shiori to Shimiko	Excellent prize of the 12th Japan Media Arts Festival Manga section	Won
2014	Uriko-hime no Yoru, Cinderella no Asa	Award for the Media Arts division at the 64th Annual MEXT Art Encouragement Prizes	Won

== Selected works ==
=== Manga ===
Title	Year	Notes	Refs
Yōkai Hunter (妖怪ハンター)	1974	serialized in Weekly Shōnen Jump	
Mud Men (マッドメン)	1975–1982	serialized in Monthly Shōnen Champion	
Ankoku Shinwa (暗黒神話)	1976	serialized in Weekly Shōnen Jump	
Kōshi Ankokuden (孔子暗黒伝)	1977–1978	serialized in Weekly Shōnen Jump	
Saiyū Yōenden (西遊妖猿伝)	1983–present	serialized in Super Action, Comic Action Character, Comic Tom, Morning and Morning two	
Gojōden (碁娘伝)	1985–2001	Serialized in Comi Comi, Manga Action and Comic Tom Plus	
Mumenboku Taikō Bōden (無面目・太公望伝)	1988–1989	Serialized in Comic Tom	
Morokai Shii (諸怪志異)	1988–2005	Serialized in Manga Action	
Kaijinki (海神記)	1990–1991	Serialized in Comic Tom	
Boku to Furio to Kōtei de (僕とフリオと校庭で)	1991	Serialized in Manga Action; Published by Futabasha in 1 vol.	
Shiori to Shimiko (栞と紙魚子)	1995–2008	Serialized in Nemuki; Published by Asahi Shimbun Shuppan in 6 vol.	
Shikaban Chōrui Zufu (私家版鳥類図譜)	2000–2002	Serialized in Morning; Published by Kodansha in 1 vol.	
Trude-obasan Grimm no yōna monogatari (トゥルーデおばさん グリムのような物語)	2002–2005	Based on Brothers Grimm; Serialized in Nemuki; Published by Asahi Sonorama in 1 vol.	
Shikaban Gyorui Zufu (私家版鳥類図譜)	2004–2006	Serialized in Bessatsu Morning and Morning; Published by Kodansha in 1 vol.	
Snow White Grimm no yōna monogatari (スノウホワイト グリムのような物語)	2006	Based on Brothers Grimm; Published by Tokyo Sogensha in 1 vol.	
Aka Sakana no Umi (悪魚の海)	2010–2011	Serialized in Ultra Jump	
Uriko-hime no Yoru, Cinderella no Asa (瓜子姫の夜・シンデレラの朝)	2013	Serialized in Nemuki+ Published by Asahi Shinbunsha in 1 vol.	
BOX – Hako no Naka ni Nanika Iru (BOX -箱の中に何かいる)	2015–2017	Serialized in Morning; Published by Kodansha in 3 vol.	
Morohoshi Daijirō Gekijō (諸星大二郎劇場)	2017–Present	Serialized in Big Comic Zōkan-gō; Published by Shogakukan in 4 vol. (as of March 2023)	

=== Novels ===
- Kyōko no Kyō wa Kyōfu no Kyō (2004)
- Kumo no Ito wa Kanarazu Kireru (2007)

=== Illustrations for books ===
- Rōkō ni Ari (Author: Ken'ichi Sakemi)

== Adaptations ==
=== Film ===
- Hiruko the Goblin (1991, Film Director: Shinya Tsukamoto)
- Kidan (2005, Film Director: Takashi Komatsu)
- Kabeotoko (British title: The Wall Man) (2007, Film Director: Wataru Hayakawa)

=== TV drama ===
- Fukushū Club (1991, Fuji Television, in Yo nimo Kimyo na Monogatari)
- Shiro (1992, Fuji Television, in Yo nimo Kimyo na Monogatari)
- Shiori to Shimiko no Kaiki Jikenbo (2008, Nippon Television)

=== Radio drama ===
- Saiyū Yōenden (1989)
- Zoku Saiyū Yōenden (1990)
- Yumemiru Kikai (2000)

=== OVA ===
- Ankoku Shinwa (The Dark Myth) Chapter 1/Chapter 2 (1990)

=== Video games ===
- Ankoku Shinwa: Yamato Takeru Densetsu (1988)
