= My Secret Cache =

- DVD cover
- Directed by: Shinobu Yaguchi
- Written by: Takuji Suzuki; Shinobu Yaguchi
- Produced by: Hideyuki Takai; Hiroshi Yanai; Mayumi Amano
- Starring: Naomi Nishida; Gō Rijū
- Cinematography: Masahiro Kishimoto
- Edited by: Miho Yoneda
- Music by: Kuniaki Yagura
- Distributed by: Toho (Japan); Geneon Entertainment (USA)
- Release date: 15 February 1997 (Japan)
- Running time: 83 minutes
- Country: Japan
- Language: Japanese

My Secret Cache is a 1997 award-winning Japanese film. Its original Japanese title is Himitsu no hanazono (Japanese: 『ひみつの花園』). The film was directed by Shinobu Yaguchi.

== Plot ==
The film begins with a prologue that quickly sketches the backstory of the protagonist: since childhood, Sakiko Suzuki was obsessed with cash. She scared off potential friends by constantly talking about her savings account, and potential suitors by demanding that they give her up front the money they would have spent taking her out on a date. After college, her family suggests she get a job as a bank teller. She's promptly hired, but soon grows disillusioned by the job, because she's counting other people's cash. Then, bank robbers kidnap her and stuff her in a trunk with a bright yellow suitcase filled with stolen money. The thieves take a wrong turn in the woods and crash their car. Sakiko escapes with the briefcase but falls into a river and winds up in an underground pool, where she tries to kill herself by drowning after letting go of the suitcase. Instead, she washes up downstream and is given medical leave by the bank.

The rest of the film traces Sakiko's quest to retrieve the money. One Sunday, she convinces her family to take her to the woods, but they give up as soon as it rains. Undeterred, Sakiko goes on without them but suffers an accident and winds up in the hospital again. So she resolves to prepare more carefully. Moving out of her family's house, she returns to college to study geology, and also takes lessons in swimming, scuba diving, mountain climbing and driving, and buys much surveying equipment. Along the way, she wins swimming and mountain climbing competitions. But she's uninterested in pursuing fame in either as a swimmer or mountain climber, wanting only to earn money to fund her quest. After her apartment's floor collapses under the weight of too much equipment and another stint at the hospital, Sakiko escapes, steals from her family and frames a research assistant at the college for stealing a bag of money from the bank; she steals his truck and goes to the woods and retrieves the suitcase. She formally apologizes to her family for stealing from them. On the radio, Sakiko hears about hidden treasures in the Bermuda triangle and decides to get a sailing license. The movie ends with Sakiko hiding the yellow briefcase in the woods.

== Cast ==
- Naomi Nishida as Sakiko Suzuki
- Gō Rijū as Edogawa
- Takako Kato as Itami Yayoi (Edogawa's ex-girlfriend)
- Noriko Kanaka as Mika Suzuki (sister)
- Kazue Tsunogae as Tomiko Suzuki (mother)
- Shinobu Tsuruta as Mikio Suzuki (father)
- Taketoshi Naito as Morita Seitaro (Professor)
- Hikaru Ijuin as Tanaka (Driving instructor)
- Tae Kimura as Eko (Swimming instructor)
- Yōji Tanaka as Iwata (Rock-climbing instructor)
- Yu Tokui (Tsubaki Bank Branch Manager)

== Reception ==
My Secret Cache does not yet have a rating from Rotten Tomatoes.

In the United States, the film has been released to DVD (region 1) by Geneon Entertainment. The average Netflix customer rates the film 2.9 stars out of five.

== Awards ==
Naomi Nishida won an award at the Japanese Academy Awards for Best Newcomer, and at the Japanese Professional Movie Awards for Best Actress.

== See also ==
- Swing Girls (2004)
