= Yoshitami Kuroiwa =

Japanese film editor

Yoshitami Kuroiwa (黒岩義民, Kuroiwa Yoshitami; date of birth unknown – 12 December 2012) was a Japanese film editor. Mainly working at Toho, he edited over 100 films, including Rickshaw Man, for which Hiroshi Inagaki won the Golden Lion at the Venice Film Festival. He worked on many Toho war films as well as on several editions of the Godzilla series. He also edited many of the films of Kihachi Okamoto.

== Selected filmography ==
- Rangiku monogatari (乱菊物語 The Maiden Courtesan) (1956)
- Monkey Sun (孫悟空 Son Gokū) (1959)
- Submarine I-57 Will Not Surrender (潜水艦イ-57降伏せず Sensuikan I-57 kofuku sezu) (1959)
- Desperado Outpost (独立愚連隊 Dokuritsu gurentai) (1959)
- Warring Clans (戦国野郎 Sengoku Yarō) (1963)
- The Elegant Life of Mr. Everyman (江分利満氏の優雅な生活 Eburiman-shi no yūgana seikatsu) (1963)
- Oh Bomb (ああ爆弾 Aa bakudan) (1964)
- Samurai Assassin (侍 Samurai) (1965)
- The Sword of Doom (大菩薩峠 Daibosatsu Tōge) (1966)
- Japan's Longest Day (日本のいちばん長い日 Nihon no ichiban nagai hi) (1967)
- Kill! (斬る Kiru) (1968)
- Battle of Okinawa (激動の昭和史 沖縄決戦 Gekidō no Shōwashi: Okinawa Kessen) (1971)
- Godzilla vs. Hedorah (ゴジラ対ヘドラ Gojira tai Hedora) (1971)
- Terror of Mechagodzilla (メカゴジラの逆襲 Mekagojira no Gyakushū) (1975)
- Sugata Sanshirō (姿三四郎) (1977)
- The Last Dinosaur (極底探険船ポーラーボーラ Kyokutei Tankensen Pōrābōra) (1977)
- Blue Christmas (ブルークリスマス Burū Kurisimasu) (1978)
- Pink Lady no Katsudō Daishashin (ピンク・レディーの活動大写真 Pinku Redī no Katsudō Daishashin) (1978)
- The Bushido Blade (1981)
- Toshi in Takarazuka: Love Forever (トシ・イン・タカラヅカ ラブ・フォーエバー) (1983)
- The Return of Godzilla (ゴジラ Gojira) (1984)
- Baby Elephant Story: The Angel Who Descended to Earth (子象物語 地上に降りた天使 Kouzou monogatari: Chijou ni orita tenshi) (1986)
- Hiruko the Goblin (妖怪ハンター ヒルコ Yōkai Hunter: Hiruko) (1991)
