= Love Forever (film) =

Toshi in Takarazuka: Love Forever
- Film poster
- Directed by: Umetsugu Inoue
- Produced by: Johnny Kitagawa; Mary Kitagawa; Hitoshi Ogura
- Cinematography: Masahiro Kishimoto; Tadashi Furuyama; Yudai Kato; Rokuro Nishigaki; Yoshinori Sekiguchi; Kenichi Yamada
- Edited by: Yoshitami Kuroiwa; Junko Shirato
- Production company: Johnny's Entertainment
- Distributed by: Toho
- Release date: August 4, 1983 (Japan)
- Running time: 43 minutes
- Country: Japan
- Language: Japanese

Toshi in Takarazuka: Love Forever (Japanese: トシ・イン・タカラヅカ ラブ・フォーエバー), also known as Love Forever, is a 1983 Japanese dance and musical film directed by Umetsugu Inoue, presenting Toshihiko Tahara, a singer then noted for his abilities as a dancer, with a large supporting cast of singers and dancers – mainly drawn from the roster of the Johnny & Associates talent agency of Johnny Kitagawa. The film was shot in the Tokyo Takarazuka Theater in Yūrakuchō on January 29–30, 1983.

== Cast ==
- Toshihiko Tahara
- Shonentai (members: Kazukiyo (ja), Noriyuki Higashiyama and Uekusa Katsuhide (ja))
- Yoshiyuki (ja)
- Matsubara Hideki (ja)
- Soga Yasuhisa (ja)
- Eagles (ja) – Teen boy band of Johnny & Associates (members: Nakamura Nariyuki (ja), Uji Masataka (ja), Utsumi Koji (ja) and Osawa Mikio (ja))
- Johnny's Jr.
- Murata Katsumi & Kuesuchonzu
- Nagura Dancing team
- Nomura Yoshio (ja)
- Masahiko Kondō
