= Kajirō Yamamoto =

Japanese film director, screenwriter, and actor

- 山本 嘉次郎
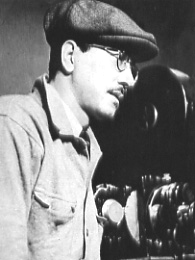
- Born: 15 March 1902; Kyōbashi, Tokyo, Japan
- Died: 21 September 1974 (aged 72)
- Occupations: Film director, screenwriter, actor

Kajirō Yamamoto (山本 嘉次郎, Yamamoto Kajirō; 15 March 1902 – 21 September 1974) was a Japanese film director, screenwriter, and actor who was known for his war films and comedies and as the mentor of the Three Crows (Akira Kurosawa, Ishirō Honda, and Senkichi Taniguchi). The combined list of his efforts as a director for documentaries, silent, and sound films includes over 90 film titles during his lifetime.

== Early life ==
Born in Tokyo, Yamamoto attended Keio University, where he helped form a film appreciation society. He first appeared in film in 1921 as an actor opposite Yoshiko Okada, but that only earned the wrath of his family, who disowned him.

== Career ==
He worked as an actor on the stage, joined Nikkatsu as an assistant director, and finally made his directorial debut in 1924 at Tōa Kinema. After working at Nikkatsu again, he was lured to Photo Chemical Laboratories (P. C. L.) in 1934, where he first made a name filming the comedies of Kenichi Enomoto. When P. C. L. became the Toho company, Yamamoto helmed realist dramas such as Tsuzurikata kyōshitsu and Uma (starring Hideko Takamine), and war films such as Hawai Mare oki kaisen.

After World War II, he continued directing films, but increasingly worked in television and radio.

== Legacy ==
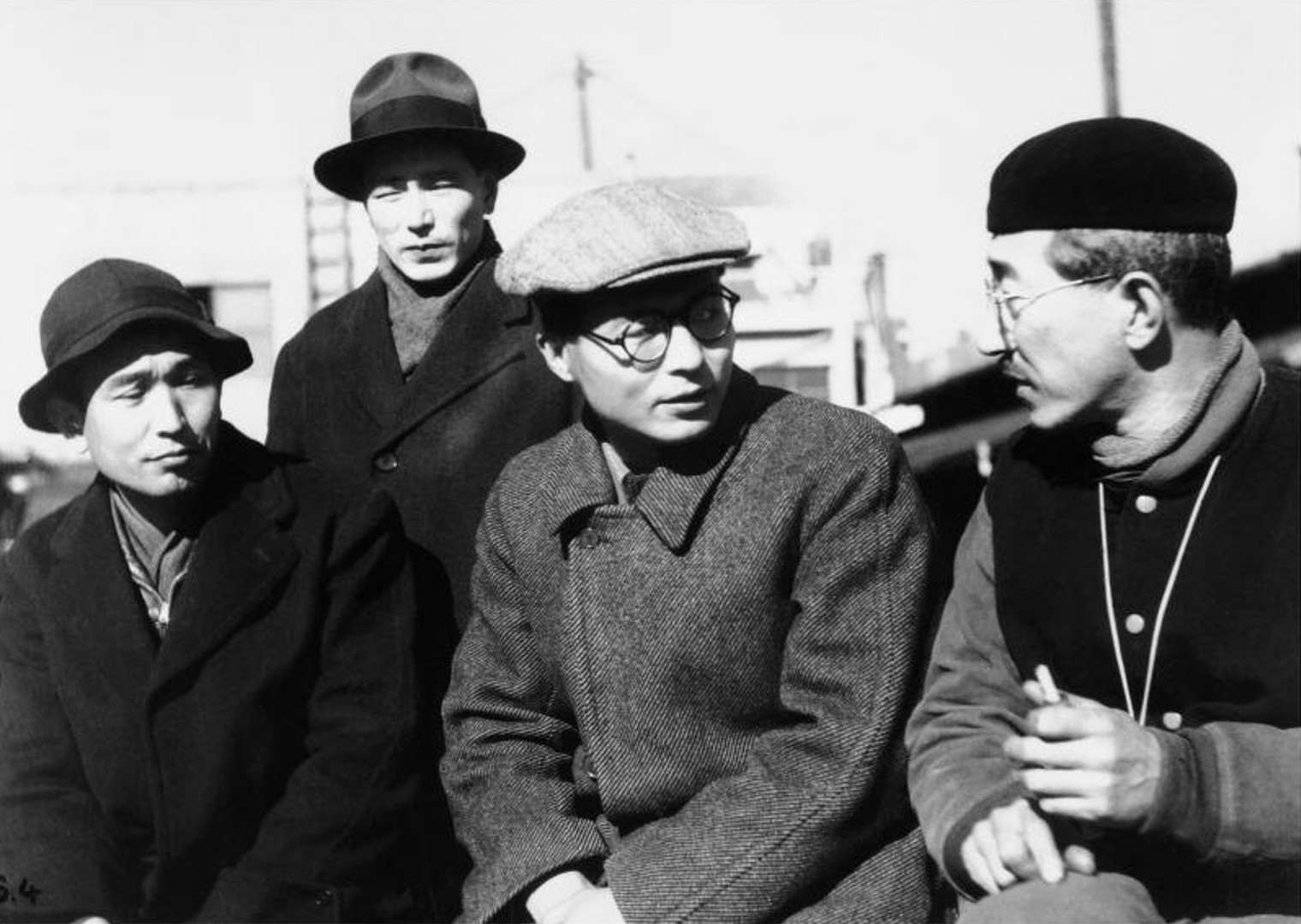
From the left: Akira Kurosawa, Honda, and Senkichi Taniguchi with their mentor Kajirō Yamamoto, late 1930s

Yamamoto is now mostly known as the mentor of three men who went on to become influential filmmakers in their own right: Akira Kurosawa, who served as his assistant director on 17 films, Ishirō Honda, who helped on 2 films, and Senkichi Taniguchi, who helped on 1.

He is also responsible for the career of Toshiro Mifune. In 1947, one of Mifune's friends who worked for the Photography Department of Toho Productions suggested Mifune try out for the Photography Department. He was accepted for a position as an assistant cameraman. At this time, a large number of Toho actors, after a prolonged strike, had formed a separate company, Shintoho. Toho then organized a "new faces" contest to find new talent. Mifune's friends submitted an application and photo, without his knowledge. He was accepted, along with 48 others (out of roughly 4000 applicants), and allowed to take a screen test for Kajirō Yamamoto. Instructed to mime anger, he drew from his wartime experiences. Yamamoto took a liking to Mifune, recommending him to director Senkichi Taniguchi.

== Selected filmography ==
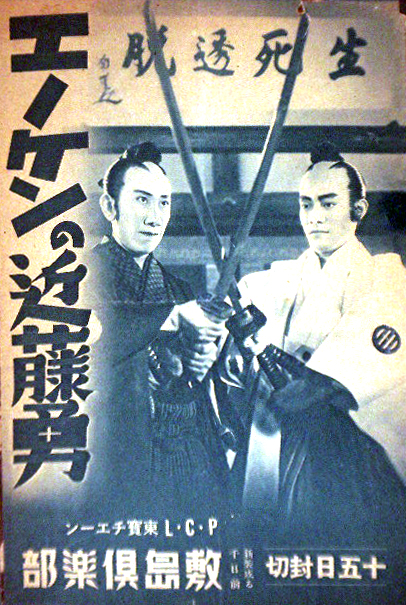
Advertisement for Enoken no Kondō Isami starring Kenichi Enomoto and Teiichi Futamura

=== Director ===
- Danun; 1924
- Renbo kouta shōdoshima jowa; 1924
- Yama no shinpi; 1924
- Bakudanji; 1925
- Hito wo kutta hanashi; 1925
- Kagayakeru tobira; 1925
- Mori no asa; 1925
- Matsuda eiga shōhin-shū: Kumo; 1926
- Junange; 1932
- Momoiro no musume; 1933
- Sōkyū no mon; 1933
- Arupusu taishō; 1934
- Ren'ai ski jutsu; 1934
- Furusato harete; 1934
- Enoken no Kondō Isami (エノケンの近藤勇) (1935)
- Sumire musume; 1935
- Botchan; 1935
- Enoken's Ten Millions 2; 1936
- Wagahai wa neko de aru; 1936
- Enoken no Chakkiri Kinta (エノケンのちゃっきり金太) (1937)
- Utsukushiki taka; 1937, with Kurosawa
- Enoken no chakkiri Kinta 'Go', kaeri wa kowai, mateba hiyori; 1937, with Kurosawa
- Enoken no chakkiri Kinta 'Zen' - Mamayo sandogasa - Ikiwa yoiyoi; 1937, with Kurosawa
- Nihon josei dokuhon (volume 1); 1937, with Kurosawa
- A Husband's Chastity: Fall Once Again; 1937, with Kurosawa
- Otto no teiso - haru kitareba; 1937, with Kurosawa
- Enoken no bikkuri jinsei; 1938, with Kurosawa
- Tsuzurikata Kyōshitsu (綴方教室) (1938), with Kurosawa
- Tōjūrō no koi; 1938, with Kurosawa
- Nonki Yokocho; 1939, with Kurosawa
- Chushingura (Go); 1939, with Kurosawa
- Chushingura (Zen); 1939, with Kurosawa
- Enoken no gatchiri jidai; 1939, with Kurosawa
- Enoken no songokū: songokū zenko-hen; 1940, with Kurosawa
- Enoken no zangiri Kinta; 1940, with Kurosawa
- Roppa no shinkon ryoko; 1940, with Kurosawa
- Uma (馬) (1941), with Kurosawa
- Hawai Mare oki kaisen (ハワイ・マレー沖海戦) (1942)
- The Sky of Hope; 1942
- Raigekitai Shutsudō; 1944
- Katō Hayabusa Sentōtai (加藤隼戦闘隊) (1944)
- Koi no fuunjî; 1945
- Amerika Yosoro; 1945
- Those Who Make Tomorrow (明日を作る人々, Asu o tsukuru hitobito) (1946)
- Haru no kyōen; 1947
- These Foolish Times II; 1947
- These Foolish Times; 1947
- Four Love Stories; 1947
- Kaze no ko; 1949
- Haru no tawamure; 1949
- Escape from Prison; 1950
- Who Knows a Woman's Heart; 1951
- Hopu-san: sararîman no maki; 1951
- Elegy; 1951
- Hana no naka no musumetachi; 1953
- Saturday Angel; 1954
- Zoku Take-chan shacho; 1954
- Take-chan shacho; 1954
- Ai no rekishi; 1955
- Muttsuri Umon torimonocho; 1955
- Ore mo otoko sa; 1955
- A Man Among Men; 1955
- Mt. Manaslu: 8,125 Meters in Altitude (Documentary); 1956
- The Underworld; 1956
- Yoshida to Sanpei monogatari: Ohanake no sekai; 1957
- A Holiday in Tokyo (東京の休日 Tōkyō no kyūjitsu) (1958)
- Jazu musume ni eiko are; 1958
- Monkey Sun (1959)
- Ginza taikutsu musume; 1960
- Hana no oedo no musekinin; 1964
- Tensai sagishi monogatari: Tanuki no hanamichi; 1964
- Tameki no taisho; 1965
- Neko no kyujitsu; 1966
- Take-chan shacho: Seishun de tsukkare!; 1967
- Take-chan shacho: Seishun wa ryu no mono da!; 1967
