= Rainbow Kids =

- Film poster
- Directed by: Kihachi Okamoto
- Screenplay by: Kihachi Okamoto
- Based on: A novel by Shin Tendo
- Produced by: Kishu Morichi; Yosuke Mizuno; Miwakawa Okamoto
- Starring: Tanie Kitabayashi; Ken Ogata
- Cinematography: Masahiro Kishimoto
- Edited by: Akira Suzuki; Akimasa Kawashima
- Music by: Masaru Sato
- Production companies: Kihachi Production; Nichimen Corp.; Fuji Eight Production
- Distributed by: Toho
- Release date: January 15, 1991 (Japan)
- Running time: 120 minutes
- Country: Japan
- Language: Japanese

Rainbow Kids (Japanese: 大誘拐, Hepburn: Daiyūkai) is a 1991 Japanese mystery comedy film directed by Kihachi Okamoto and starring Tanie Kitabayashi and Ken Ogata. The film won several Japanese film awards, including Tanie Kitabayashi who won awards for Best Actress at Kinema Junpo Awards, Mainichi Film Concours, and the Japanese Academy Awards.

== Plot ==
Three recently released criminals decide to kidnap an 82-year-old woman, Toshiko Yanagawa (Tanie Kitabayashi) everyone calls her "Toji (刀自, lit. 'Classical honorific for old Woman') ", the wealthiest woman because she is a forestry owner in Wakayama Prefecture. They stake out her mansion, observing her for two months. During that time, Toji occasionally leaves the mansion to go on mountain hikes with her chambermaid, Kimi. It is on one of those hikes that the three kidnappers make their move. Toji calmly negotiates with the kidnappers to let Kimi go.

But once they have Toji in their car en route to the hideout, she begins giving them advice on how to avoid the police, convincing them to take her to a former servant's house instead of to their hideout. There, Toji is insulted to hear the kidnappers say her ransom is only 50 million yen (about 350,000 in American dollars of the time), and demands they raise it to 10 billion yen (a conversion to $6,666,666 is explicitly stated in the film). The kidnappers are aghast, but ultimately they comply. Furthermore, Toji also orchestrates how the ransom note will be delivered, how her family will get the money together, and how the police will deliver it.

Police inspector Daigoro Igari (Ken Ogata) takes a special interest in the case because of Toji's charity towards him in the past. He addresses the kidnappers on TV to express skepticism that Toji really is safe. Toji arranges a TV broadcast from an undisclosed location, to show that she really is safe and to instruct her family on how to sell off some of their land so that after taxes there is enough money to pay the ransom.

Ten billion yen turn out to take up a lot of space, so much so that a helicopter loaded with it barely has room left for the pilot. A second helicopter follows the ransom helicopter, but after setting down in a mountain pass, the ransom helicopter disappears. After flying an erratic path all over the wilderness, the pilot is found in a cave, drugged to sleep.

Meanwhile, one of the kidnappers has fallen in love with a local woman and decided to become an honest man; he refuses his share of the ransom. Another kidnapper does take his cut, but he takes it to mean what he was originally promised, ten million yen. And the kidnapper who came up with the idea in the first place decides to go to work for Toji as a carpenter. His first task is to repair a shrine. Inspector Igari shows up to let Toji know he has figured out most of her plan and its purpose: to evade taxes and prevent "her" mountains from falling into government ownership. Igari suspects most of the ten billion yen are hidden in the recently repaired shrine, but he also indicates he won't pursue the matter.

== Cast ==
- Tanie Kitabayashi as Mrs. Toshiko Yanagawa
- Toru Kazama as "Lightning" Kenji
- Katsuyasu Uchida as "Wind" Masayoshi
- Hiroshi Nishikawa as "Rain" Heita
- Ken Ogata as Daigoro Igari
- Kirin Kiki as Kura Nakamura
- Shigeru Koyama as Kunjiro Yanagawa
- Kumi Mizuno as Kanako Yanagawa
- Ittoku Kishibe as Daisaku Yanagawa
- Nami Tamura as Eiko Yanagawa
- Hirotarō Honda as Takano
- Minori Terada as narrator
- Yu Fujiki
- Raita Ryū as Sakuma
- Ichirō Nakatani as President of Wakayama TV
- Hideyo "Eisei" Amamoto as Kushida

== Other Credits ==
- Yoshinobu Nishioka, Ryoichi Kamon - Art director
- Tadahiro Hasimoto - Assistant director

== Release ==
Rainbow Kids was released theatrically in Japan on January 15, 1991 where it was distributed by Toho. It became the top grossing non-animated Japanese film of 1991. The film was shown at import theatres in the United States and was exhibited at the AFI/Los Angeles Film Festival on July 1, 1992 under the title The Great Kidnapping. It was later shown at the Japan Today Film Festival in Los Angeles on November 3, 1992 as Great Kidnapping.

The film received a DVD released in the United States on August 29, 2006 under the title Rainbow Kids by Geneon/Pioneer.

== Reception ==
In Japan, the film won several awards. At the Japanese Academy Awards, the film won the awards for Best Director (Kihachi Okamoto), Best Actress (Tanie Kitabayashi) and Best Editing. Kitabayashi won two other Best Actress awards, from the Kinema Junpo Awards and from the Mainichi Film Concours.

== Footnotes ==
=== References ===
- Galbraith IV, Stuart (2008). The Toho Studios Story: A History and Complete Filmography. Scarecrow Press. ISBN 978-1461673743.
