= Midori Kinouchi =

Japanese actress and singer (born 1957)

- Born: June 10, 1957 (age 69)
- Occupations: actress and singer
- Spouse: Naoto Takenaka

Midori Kinouchi (木之内 みどり, Kinouchi Midori, b. Midori Kiuchi on June 10, 1957) is a former Japanese idol and actress.

== Biography ==
In 1972 Midori Kinouchi was the runner up in the NTV program "Miss Teen Contest". She debuted as a singer in May, 1974 with the song "Mezame" (Wake Up), which was written by famous Japanese lyricist Yū Aku. She debuted as an actress in 1976 in the drama "Watashi Mo Moeiteru" and starred in the 1977 TV series Superdog Black .

In early 1978 she scored her biggest hit with "Yokohama Eleven", which reached the Oricon top 30. That same year she announced her retirement because of her marriage to composer and arranger Tsugutoshi Gotō. They divorced 4 years later, and she subsequently married Naoto Takenaka in 1990.

== See also ==
- Kayōkyoku
- Japanese idol
- List of Japanese idols
