= Shūko Honami =

Japanese actress

- Born: January 23, 1950 (age 75); Tokyo, Japan
- Occupation: Actress

Shūko Honami (本阿弥 周子, Honami Shūko) is a Japanese actress. She won the award for best supporting actress at the 10th Yokohama Film Festival for Ureshi Hazukashi Monogatari.

== Filmography ==
- The Last Samurai (1974)
- Ureshi Hazukashi Monogatari (1988)
- Ladybyrinth (1997)
