= Naoto Takenaka =

Japanese actor

- 竹中 直人
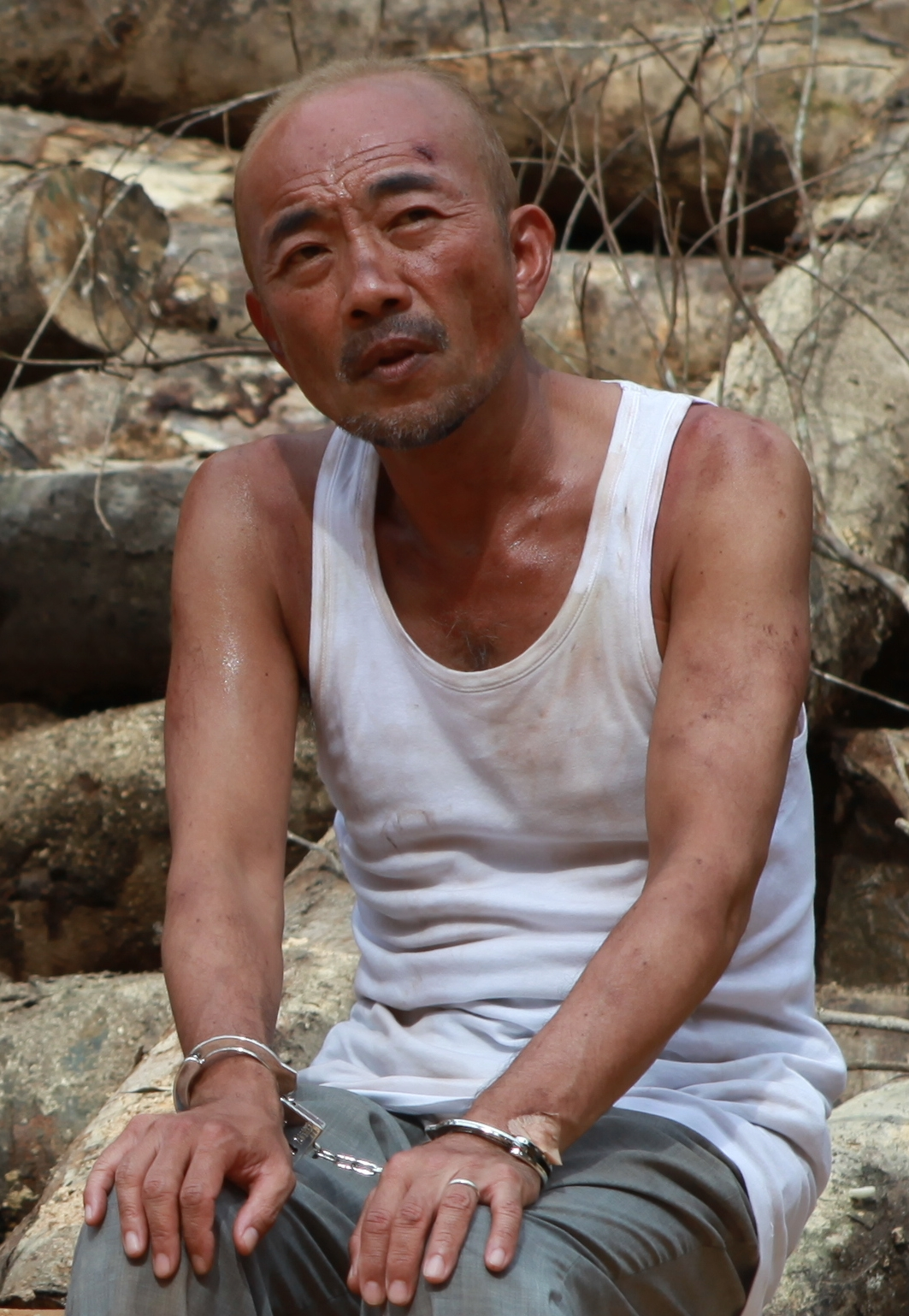
- Takenaka filming Ken and Mary in 2012
- Born: March 20, 1956 (age 70); Kanazawa-ku, Yokohama, Kanagawa Prefecture, Japan
- Occupations: Actor, voice actor, film director, tarento, comedian, singer
- Years active: 1983–present
- Agent: Lady Bird
- Spouse: Midori Kinouchi (m. 1990)
- Website: http://www.from1-pro.jp/talent/detail.php?id=2

Naoto Takenaka (竹中 直人, Takenaka Naoto; born March 20, 1956) is a Japanese actor, comedian, singer, whistler, and director from Kanazawa-ku, Yokohama, Kanagawa Prefecture, affiliated with From First Production. He is married to idol singer and actress Midori Kinouchi. He is also known as the voice of Samuel L. Jackson in the dubbed version of the Avengers film series as Nick Fury.

== Filmography ==
=== Film ===
Director

- Munō no Hito (1991)
- 119 (1994)
- Tōkyō Biyori (1997)
- Rendan (2001)
- Sayonara Color (2005)
- Yamagata Scream (2009)
- Downfall (2023)

Actor

- Tera Senshi PSI Boy (1985), Marui
- Gonza the Spearman (1986)
- Fancy Dance (1989)
- Best Guy (1990)
- Uchū no hōsoku (1990)
- Chizuko's Younger Sister (1991)
- Hiruko the Goblin (1991)
- Until the End of the World (1991)
- Sumo Do, Sumo Don't (1992)
- Like a Rolling Stone (1994)
- Rampo (1994)
- Tokyo Fist (1995)
- Gonin (1995)
- East Meets West (1995)
- Shall We Dance? (1996), Tomio Aoki
- By Player (2000), Taiji Tonoyama
- Agitator (2001)
- Waterboys (2001)
- The Happiness of the Katakuris (2001)
- Ping Pong (2002)
- Muscle Heat (2002)
- Azumi (2003)
- Swing Girls (2004), Tadahiko Ozawa
- Sayonara Color (2005)
- Midnight Sun (2006)
- The School of Water Business (2006)
- Catch a Wave (2006)
- 26 Years Diary (2007)
- Kurosagi (2008)
- My Girlfriend is a Cyborg (2008)
- Tokyo! (2008)
- Hana Yori Dango Final (2008)
- 4 Shimai Tantei Dan (2008)
- Saikin-rettō (2009)
- Shinjuku Incident (2009)
- On Next Sunday (2009)
- Mutant Girls Squad (2010)
- Hara-Kiri: Death of a Samurai (2011)
- Karate-Robo Zaborgar (2011)
- Hello, My Dolly Girlfriend (2013)
- Lady Maiko (2014)
- The Big Bee (2015)
- Gonin Saga (2015)
- 125 Years Memory (2015), Kudo
- Gold Medal Man (2016)
- Manhunt (2017)
- Color Me True (2018)
- Reon (2018)
- Out and Out (2018)
- Talking the Pictures (2019)
- Fly Me to the Saitama (2019), the governor of Kanagawa Prefecture
- Toshimaen (2019)
- Samurai Marathon (2019)
- Life on the Longboard: 2nd Wave (2019)
- Enter the Fat Dragon (2020)
- Dosukoi! Sukehira (2019)
- Not Quite Dead Yet (2020)
- The Grapes of Joy (2021)
- The Blue Danube (2021)
- Your Turn to Kill: The Movie (2021)
- The Way of the Househusband (2022), Kikujirō Eguchi
- The Broken Commandment (2022)
- Maku wo Orosuna! (2023), Matsuo Bashō
- Six Singing Women (2023)
- Dare to Stop Us 2 (2024)
- What If Shogun Ieyasu Tokugawa Was to Become the Prime Minister (2024), Toyotomi Hideyoshi
- Lust in the Rain (2024), Oyaji
- Manga Artist, Mamoru Hori (2024), Kurata
- A Day Begins (2024), Yabuki
- Demon City (2025), Haruo Kawano
- Flash Mob Panic (2025)
- Mission: Sorta Possible (2025)
- Road to Vendetta (2025)
- Ghost of Ueno (2026), Toshi
- Ame no Etranger (2026), Kakegawa
- The High School Family (2027), Tomohiro Kiryu
- The Degrees of Pain (TBA)

=== Television ===
- Hideyoshi (1996), Toyotomi Hideyoshi
- Harlock Saga (1999) - Harlock
- 100 Tales Of Horror (2003)
- Good Luck!! (2003)
- Nodame Cantabile (2006), Franz von Stresemann
- Teki wa Honnoji ni Ari (2007), Hashiba Hideyoshi
- Kami no Shizuku (2009), Doi Robert
- Clouds Over the Hill (2009–11), Komura Jutarō
- Garo: Makai Senki (2011) (Episode 1), Eiichi Anan/Cigarein
- Gunshi Kanbei (2014), Toyotomi Hideyoshi
- Kamen Rider Ghost (2015), Hermit, Edith
- Natsume Sōseki no Tsuma (2016)
- Saigo no Restaurant (2016), Oda Nobunaga
- Byplayers (2017), himself
- Samurai Gourmet (2017), Takeshi Kasumi
- Totto-chan! (2017), Sōsaku Kobayashi
- Chichi, Nobunaga (2017), Oda Nobunaga
- Your Turn to Kill (2019)
- The Way of the Househusband (2020), Kikujirō Eguchi
- Koeharu! (2021), Enjō Kinakuji
- Reach Beyond the Blue Sky (2021), Tokugawa Nariaki
- Okehazama (2021), Hotta Dōkū
- I Will Be Your Bloom (2022), Trinity Kasuga
- Brothers in Arms (2026), Matsunaga Hisahide
- Hakone Ekiden: Our Story (2026), Bunzo Karashima

=== Anime series ===
- One Piece (2009), Shiki the Golden Lion
- D4DJ First Mix (2020), Dennojō Inuyose
- Digimon Ghost Game (2021), Ghost Navigator

=== Anime films ===
- Patlabor 2: The Movie (1993), Shigeki Arakawa
- Pocket Monsters the Movie: Emperor of the Crystal Tower ENTEI (2000), Entei, Doctor Shurī (Dr Spencer Hale in the dub)
- Ghost in the Shell 2: Innocence (2004), Kimu
- Sword of the Stranger (2007), Kachū
- The Sky Crawlers (2008), Master
- One Piece Film: Strong World (2009), Shiki the Golden Lion
- Penguin Highway (2018), Hamamoto's Father
- One Piece: Stampede (2019)
- Over the Sky (2020), Mogari
- Dead Dead Demon's Dededede Destruction (2024), Head of the Invaders

=== Video games ===
- Binary Domain (PlayStation 3, Sega, 2012), Yoji Amada
- Ryū ga Gotoku Kenzan! (PlayStation 3, Sega, 2008), Nagayoshi Marume
- Haunting Ground (PlayStation 2, Capcom, 2005), Cinematics director
- Nioh 2 (2020), Tōkichirō

== Dubbing roles ==
=== Live-action ===
- Batman Forever (1995) – Bruce Wayne/Batman (Val Kilmer)
- Batman & Robin (1997) – Bruce Wayne/Batman (George Clooney)
- The Avengers (2012) – Nick Fury (Samuel L. Jackson)
- Captain America: The Winter Soldier (2014) – Nick Fury (Samuel L. Jackson)
- Avengers: Age of Ultron (2015) – Nick Fury (Samuel L. Jackson)
- Avengers: Infinity War (2018) – Nick Fury (Samuel L. Jackson)
- Captain Marvel (2019) – Nick Fury (Samuel L. Jackson)
- Spider-Man: Far From Home (2019) – Nick Fury (Samuel L. Jackson)
- Secret Invasion (2023) – Nick Fury (Samuel L. Jackson)
- The Marvels (2023) – Nick Fury (Samuel L. Jackson)

=== Animation ===
- Postman Pat (1994) – Narrator and all voices
- The Hunchback of Notre Dame II (2002) – Sarousch
- Ice Age (2002) – Diego
- Shrek 2 (2004) – Puss in Boots
- Ice Age: The Meltdown (2006) – Diego
- Shrek the Third (2008) – Puss in Boots
- Ice Age: Dawn of the Dinosaurs (2009) – Diego
- Shrek Forever After (2011) – Puss in Boots
- Puss in Boots (2011) – Puss in Boots

== Discography ==
=== Singles ===
- "Wrestler" (1984)
- "Postman Pat no Uta" (1994)
- "Dokutoku-kun" (1995)
- "Deka Melon" (1997)
- "Kimi ni Hoshi ga Furu" (1997)
- "Nichiyōbino Shokuji" (1998)

=== Albums ===
- Kawatta Katachi no Ishi (1984)
- Naoto Takenaka no Kimi to Itsumademo (1995)
- Merci Boku (1995)
- Merci Boku, Unpeu Boku ~ Live in Japan (1995)
- Eraserhead (1996)
- Kuchibue to Ukulele (2000)

== Other appearances ==
- Demento (PlayStation 2, Capcom, 2005) – Cinematics director, motion actor (Riccardo)

== Film awards ==
- 1991

Blue Ribbon Awards: Best Actor (Munō no Hito)
Hochi Film Awards: Rookie of the Year (Munō no Hito)
Venice Film Festival: FIPRESCI Prize (Munō no Hito)

- 1993

16th Japan Academy Film Prize: Best Supporting Actor (Shiko Funjatta)

- 1996

19th Japan Academy Film Prize: Best Supporting Actor (East Meets West)

- 1997

20th Japan Academy Film Prize: Best Supporting Actor (Shall We Dance?)
