= Kizuna =

Kizuna (絆) is a Japanese word meaning "bond." It may also refer to:

== Music ==
- Kizuna (album), a 2022 album by JO1
- "Kizuna" (Aya Matsuura song)
- "Kizuna" (Aya Ueto song)
- "Kizuna" (Orange Range song)
- "Kizuna," a song from the anime Mermaid Melody Pichi Pichi Pitch
- "Kizuna," a song by Tiana Xiao
- "Kizuna," a song from Seishun Amigo by Kazuya Kamenashi
- "Kizuna," a song by Ayane
- "Kizuna," a piece of music from the anime Fairy Tail
- "Kizuna," a song by the Japanese power metal group Galneryus
- "Kizuna," a song by Aimer
- Sakura Gakuin 2013 Nendo: Kizuna, a 2014 album by Sakura Gakuin
- Kizuna Arena Tour, the first concert tour by the Japanese boy band JO1
- "Kizuna Music," a song from BanG Dream! Ss2 Opening
- Kizuna no Kiseki, song recorded by Japanese rock band Man with a Mission and Japanese singer Milet

== Television ==
- Kizuna, a 1998 Japanese film directed by Kichitaro Negishi
- Kizuna no Allele, Japanese anime television series
- Gekijōban Naruto Shippūden: Kizuna, the fifth Naruto movie (second in the Shippūden series)
- Digimon Adventure: Last Evolution Kizuna, 2020 film.

== Game ==
- Kizuna, an action RPG (role-playing game) for Wii developed by Jaleco
- Kizuna Encounter, a fighting game for the Neo Geo

== People ==
- Kizuna Tanaka (田中 希沙; born 2004), Japanese professional wrestler

== Other ==
- Kizuna-kai, (絆會) is a yakuza organization based in Hyogo, Japan
- Kizuna (horse), a Thoroughbred racehorse
- Kizuna AI (Japanese: キズナアイ), The Japanese virtual YouTuber and self-proclaimed artificial intelligence.
- Kizuna: Bonds of Love, a yaoi (women's male/male romance) manga
- Kizuna bridge, a bridge in Cambodia
- Kizuna, a Japanese political party formed by nine former Lower House members of the Democratic Party of Japan
- The word was chosen to be 2011's Kanji of the year
- KIZUNA COIN, The Japan's cryptocurrency with Directed acyclic graph (DAG) technology since 2018.
- Kizuna Rank, also known as Trust Rank, a mechanic in the game Hatsune Miku: Colorful Stage!
- WINDS, also known as Kizuna, was a Japanese communication satellite
