= Masaru Sato =

Japanese composer (1928–1999)

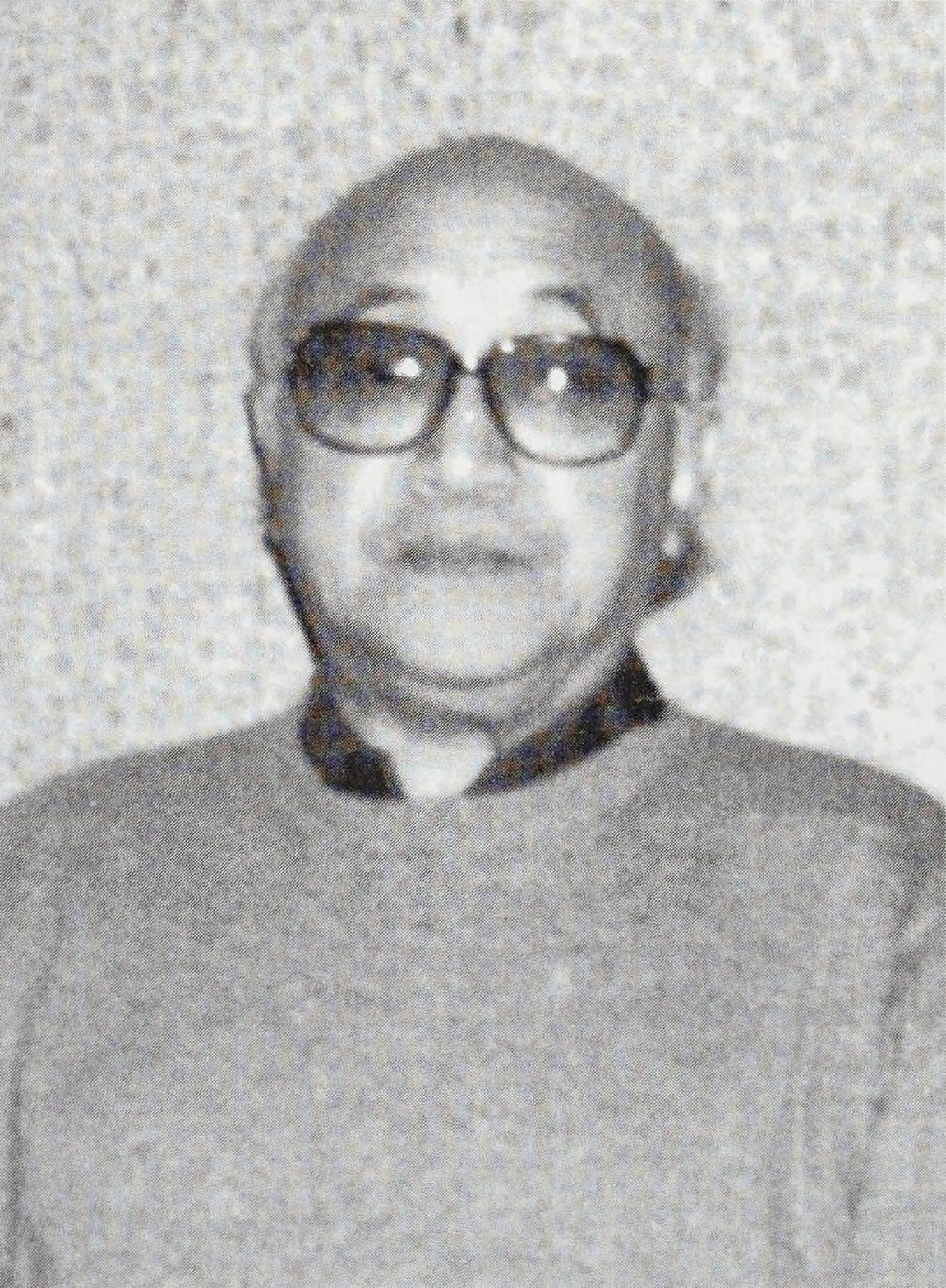
- Sato c. 1996

Background information
- Born: May 29, 1928; Rumoi, Hokkaido, Empire of Japan
- Died: December 5, 1999 (aged 71)
- Genres: Film score
- Occupation: Composer
- Years active: 1952–1999

Masaru Sato (Japanese: 佐藤 勝, Hepburn: Satō Masaru; May 29, 1928 – December 5, 1999) (sometimes transliterated Satoh) was a Japanese composer of film scores. Following the 1955 death of Fumio Hayasaka, whom Sato studied under, Sato was the composer of Akira Kurosawa's films for the next 10 years. He was nominated for Best Music at the 15th Japan Academy Prize in 1992. In 1999, the Japanese government decorated Sato with the Order of the Rising Sun, 4th Class, Gold Rays with Rosette for his contributions to the arts.

== Career ==
He was born in Rumoi, Hokkaido, and raised in Sapporo. While studying at the National Music Academy, Sato came under the influence of Fumio Hayasaka, Akira Kurosawa's regular composer for his earlier films. He became a pupil of Hayasaka's, studying film scoring with him at Toho Studios, and working on the orchestration of Seven Samurai (1954). When the older composer died suddenly in 1955, leaving the scores to Kenji Mizoguchi's New Tales of the Taira Clan, and Kurosawa's I Live in Fear incomplete, Toho assigned Sato to finish them. His first original score was for Godzilla Raids Again in 1955. He wrote the music to all of Kurosawa's movies for the next decade, including Throne of Blood, The Bad Sleep Well, Yojimbo, Sanjuro, and Red Beard. According to Stephen Prince, Sato stopped working with Kurosawa due to the director's "penchant for meddling" with his music and trying to rewrite it. In addition to Mizoguchi and Kurosawa, Sato worked with Hideo Gosha.

His work in the realm of popular film continued throughout his career, composing the scores to Ishirō Honda's Half Human (1955) and The H-Man (1958), Senkichi Taniguchi's The Lost World of Sinbad (1963), and four Godzilla films: Godzilla Raids Again (1955), Ebirah, Horror of the Deep (1966), Son of Godzilla (1967), and Godzilla vs. Mechagodzilla (1974). During his 44-year association with Toho Studios, he wrote more than 300 film scores. He also created the music for such Japanese television series as The Water Margin.

== Musical style ==
Sato's style differs considerably from Akira Ifukube, the principal composer of the Godzilla films. Ifukube's scores show strong roots in European classical music, as well as influences from Japanese traditional and Ainu folk music. Sato, however, employed Western popular styles and light jazz in his film scores. Unlike Ifukube, Sato apparently never felt the need to compose for the concert stage, writing exclusively for film.

== Selected works ==
=== Film scores ===
- Rokunin no Ansatsusha (1955)
- I Live in Fear (1955)
- Godzilla Raids Again (1955)
- Half Human (1955)
- Season of the Sun (1956)
- Crazed Fruit (1956)
- Vampire Moth (1956)
- Throne of Blood (1957)
- Ikiteiru Koheiji (1957)
- I Am Waiting (1957)
- The Lower Depths (1957)
- Song for a Bride (1958)
- Rusty Knife (1958)
- A Slope in the Sun (1958)
- The H-Man (1958)
- The Hidden Fortress (1958)
- The Bad Sleep Well (1960)
- Yojimbo (1961)
- Sanjuro (1962)
- High and Low (1963)
- Warring Clans (1963)
- The Elegant Life of Mr. Everyman (1963)
- Red Beard (1965)
- Kiri no Hata (1965)
- The Sword of Doom (1966)
- Ebirah, Horror of the Deep (1966)
- Lake of Tears (1966)
- The Age of Assassins (1967)
- Japan's Longest Day (1967)
- Son of Godzilla (1967)
- Kill! (1968)
- The Human Bullet (1968)
- Red Lion (1968)
- Goyokin (1969)
- Hitokiri (1969)
- The Scandalous Adventures of Buraikan (1970)
- Battle of Okinawa (1971)
- The Wolves (1971)
- Submersion of Japan (1973)
- The Twilight Years (1973)
- Karei-naru Ichizoku (1974)
- Lupin III: Strange Psychokinetic Strategy (1974)
- Godzilla vs. Mechagodzilla (1974)
- Fumō Chitai (1976)
- The Yellow Handkerchief (1977)
- Blue Christmas (1978)
- Hunter in the Dark (1978)
- The Glacier Fox (1978)
- Ah! Nomugi Toge (1979)
- Sanada Yukimura no Bōryaku (1979)
- A Distant Cry from Spring (1980)
- Toward the Terra (1980)
- Willful Murder (1981)
- The Geisha (1983)
- Fireflies in the North (1984)
- Yakuza Wives (1986)
- Itazu Kuma (1987)
- The Silk Road (1988)
- Shogun's Shadow (1989)
- Rainbow Kids (1991)
- Tsuribaka Nisshi 4 (1991)
- The Oil-Hell Murder (1992)
- Bloom in the Moonlight (1993)
- East Meets West (1995)
- After the Rain (2000)

=== Television ===
- The Water Margin (1973)
- Ronin of the Wilderness Season 2 (1974)
- Haru no Hato (1985)
- Gokenin Zankurō (1995)
