= 1945–1998 =

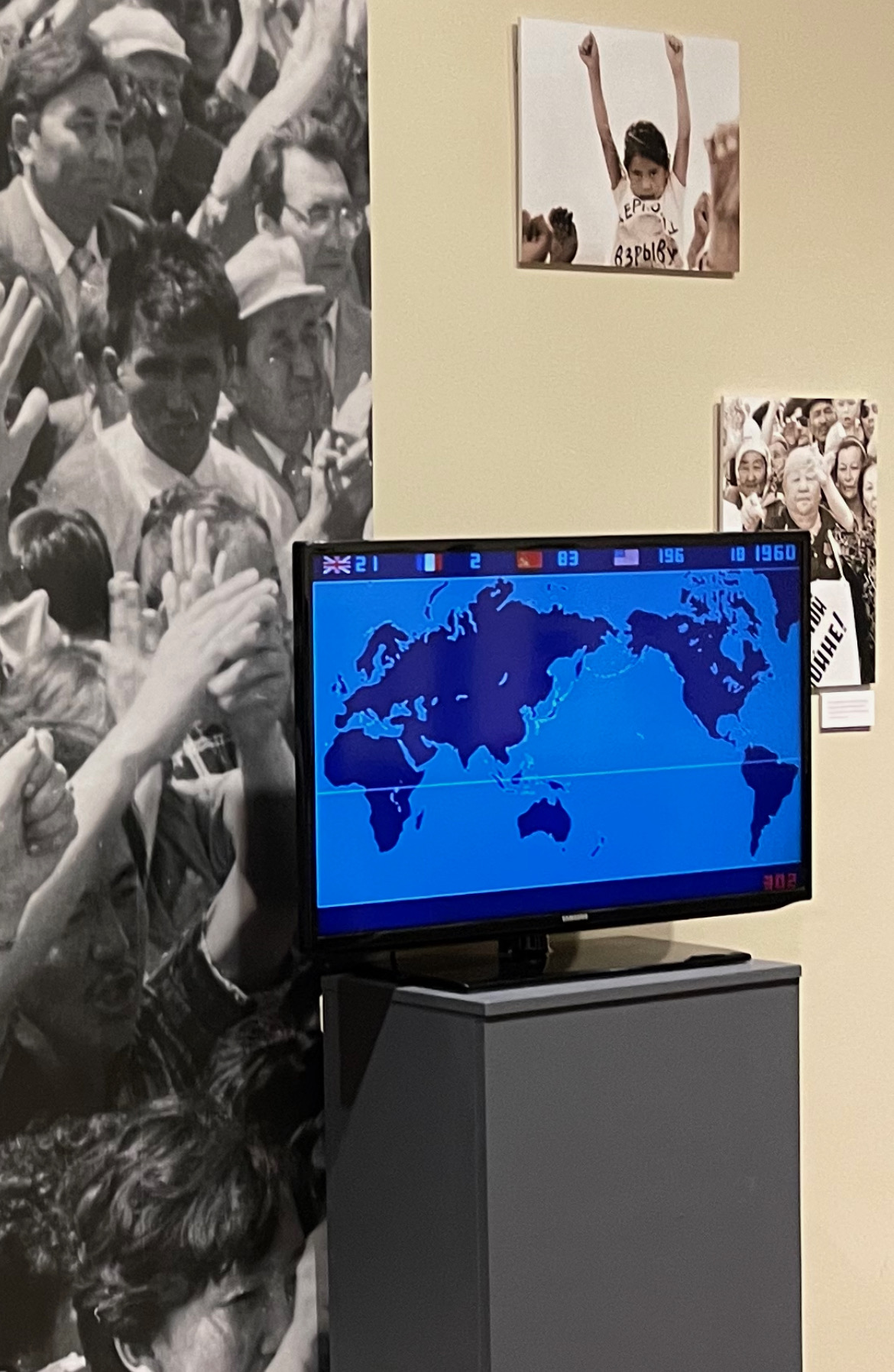
- The piece on display at the United Nations headquarters
- Based on: Nuclear Explosions 1945-1998 by: Nils-Olov Bergkvist; Ragnhild Ferm
- Produced by: Isao Hashimoto
- Release date: 2003
- Running time: 14 minutes
- Country: Japan
- Language: English

1945–1998 is a piece created by Isao Hashimoto showing a time-lapse of every nuclear explosion between 1945 and 1998.

== Contents ==
The piece begins with the USA's Trinity test followed by the two atomic bombings of Hiroshima and Nagasaki. The United States conducts several nuclear tests after the war. The Soviet Union and United Kingdom then gain nuclear weapons, increasing the number of explosions. The piece continues until it gets to Pakistan's first nuclear test in 1998. The total number of weapons detonated is 2053.

The piece uses sound and light to startle the viewer. Months (measured in seconds) and years are each represented by a sound. When a nuclear explosion occurs, a musical sound plays. Different countries have different tones, which sometimes results in a polyphonic composition, overwhelming the viewer.

== Reception ==
The piece is generally well received. The piece is praised for conveying the costs a nuclear war would cause. The piece has been described as "eerie", "scary", and "terrifying".
