= Hideyo Amamoto =

Japanese actor

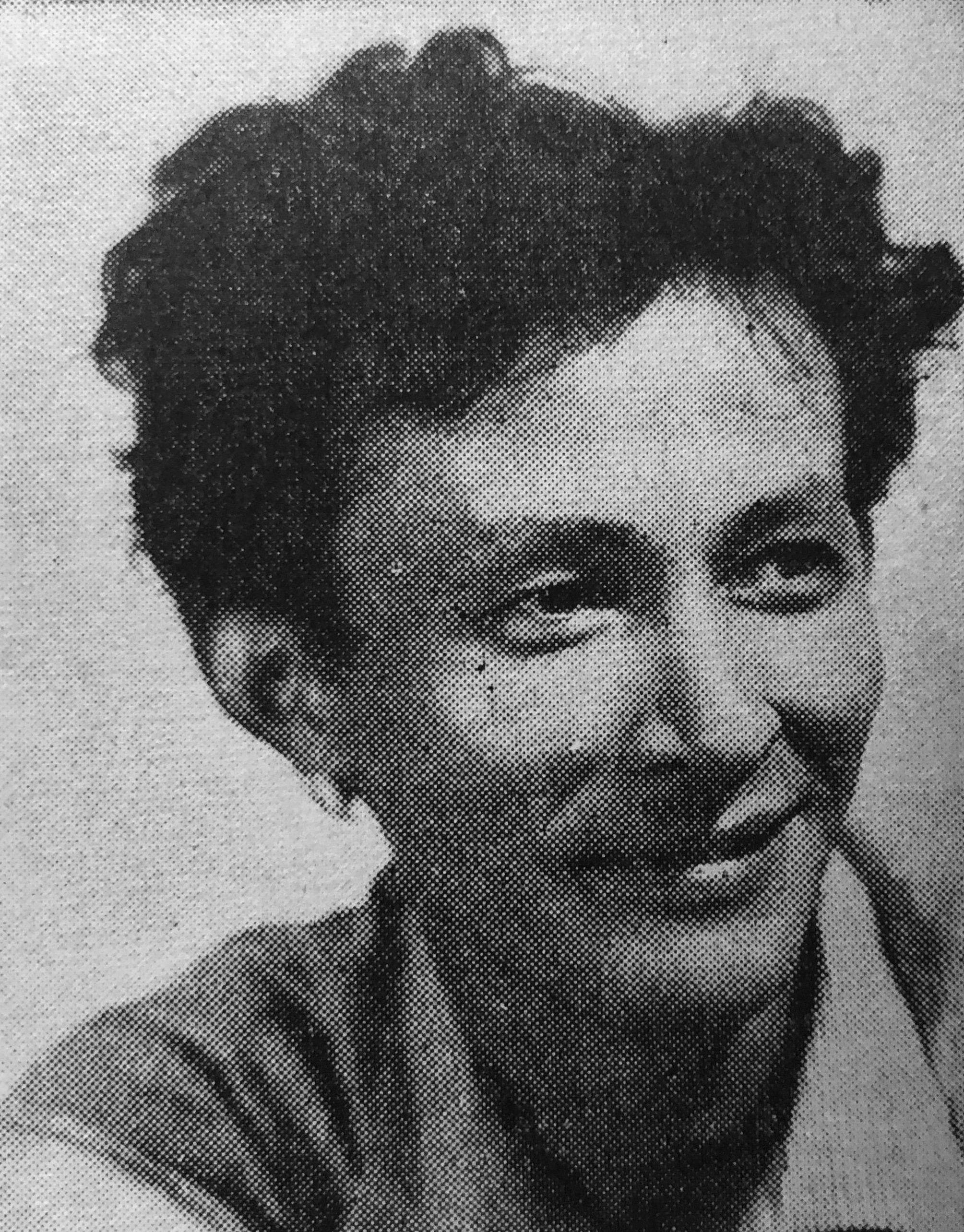
- Amamoto in 1961
- Born: January 2, 1926; Wakamatsu-ku, Kitakyūshū, Fukuoka Prefecture, Japan
- Died: March 23, 2003 (aged 77); Wakamatsu-ku, Kitakyūshū, Fukuoka, Japan
- Other name: Eisei Amamoto
- Occupation: Actor
- Years active: 1954–2003
- Height: 1.80 m (5 ft 11 in)

Hideyo Amamoto (天本 英世, Amamoto Hideyo; January 2, 1926 – March 23, 2003) was a Japanese actor. He is best known for portraying Dr. Shinigami in the original Kamen Rider series as well as many other characters in tokusatsu films such as the Godzilla series. Amamoto also used the pseudonym of Eisei Amamoto for most of his career, Eisei being a misreading of the kanji in his real name, Hideyo. He died on March 23, 2003, of complications from pneumonia at 77.

== Film and television credits ==
=== 1950s ===
- Nijushi no hitomi (1954) as Hisako's husband
- The Garden of Women (1954) as Professor (uncredited)
- Twenty-Four Eyes (1954) as Ôishi Sensei no Otto
- Ai wa furu hoshi no kanata ni (1956) as Chen LongCheng
- Yûwaku (1957) as Kyôzô Ikegami
- Kunin no shikeishû (1957) as Takao Nakamura
- Yatsu ga satsujinsha da (1958)
- Mikkokusha wa dare ka (1958) as Nakao
- Jinsei gekijô - Seishun hen (1958)
- Ankokugai no kaoyaku (1959)
- Songoku: The Road to the West (1959)
- Aru kengo no shogai (1959)
- Seishun o kakero (1959) as Senzaka
- The Birth of Japan (1959) as Spectator at Gods' Dance

=== 1960s ===
- Ankokugai no taiketsu (1960) as Ichino
- Kunisada Chuji (1960) as Tomimatsu
- Denso Ningen (1960) as Onishi's Henchman
- Dâisan hâtobanô kêtto (1960)
- Otoko tai otoko (1960) as Killer
- Dokuritsu gurentai nishi-e (1960)
- Osaka jo monogatari (1961) as Interpreter
- Ankokugai no dankon (1961)
- Yojimbo (1961) as Yahachi
- Honkon no yoru (1961)
- Kurenai no umi (aka Blood on the Sea) (1961)
- Shinko no otoko (1961)
- Gorath (1962) as Drunk
- Kurenai no sora (1962)
- Dobunezumi sakusen (1962)
- Chūshingura: Hana no Maki, Yuki no Maki (1962) as Takano, of the Chunagons
- Ankokugai no kiba (1962)
- Sengoku Yaro (1963)
- Matango (1963) as Skulking Transitional Matango
- Kokusai himitsu keisatsu—Shirei 8 go (aka Interpol Code 8) (1963) (note: first of five films in the "Kokusai himitsu keisatsu" series) as Shû
- Hiken (1963)
- Daitozoku (1963) as Granny the Witch
- Eburi manshi no yuga-na seikatsu (1963)
- Atragon (1963) as High Priest of Mu
- Aa bakudan (1964) as Tetsu
- Dogara, the Space Monster (1964) as Maki the Safecracker
- transl. ja – transl. Ware hitotsubu no mugi naredo (1964)
- Ghidorah, the Three-Headed Monster (1964) as Princess Salno's aide
- Kwaidan (1964) (segment "Chawan no naka")
- Samurai (1965) sd Matazaburo Hagiwara
- Fort Graveyard (1965) as Shiga
- Kokusai himitsu keisatsu: Kagi no kagi (1965) as Numaguchi, Snake-Training Gangster
- Gohiki no shinshi (1966)
- Abare Goemon (1966) as Heiroku
- The Sword of Doom (1966) as Lord Shuzen Kamio
- Kiganjo no boken (1966) as Granny the Old Witch
- Tenamonya Tokaido (1966)
- Ebirah, Horror of the Deep (1966) as Red Bamboo Naval Officer
- Satsujin kyo jidai (1967) as Shogo Mizorogi
- Kokusai himitsu keisatsu: Zettai zetsumei (1967) as First Murderer
- Sasaki Kojiro (1967)
- King Kong Escapes (1967) as Dr. Who
- Nihon no ichiban nagai hi (1967) as Captain Takeo Sasaki
- Ultra Q (1967, TV series, Episode "Open the Door!") as Kenji Tomono - Mysterious Old Man
- Dorifutazu desu yo! Zenshin zenshin matazenshin (1967)
- Za taigasu: Sekai wa bokura o matteiru (1968) as Heraclues
- Kiru (1968) as Gendayu Shimada
- Nikudan (1968) as Father of Him
- Konto55go—Seiki no Daijakuten (1968) as Sawada
- Kureejii Mekishiko dai sakusen (aka Mexican Free-for-All) (1968)
- Mighty Jack (1968, TV Series)
- Akage (1969) as Dr. Gensai
- Portrait of Hell (1969)
- All Monsters Attack (1969) as Toy Consultant Shinpei Inami

=== 1970s ===
- Kureji no nagurikomi Shimizu Minato (1970)
- Gekido no showashi 'Gunbatsu' (1970) as Prof. Fuyuki (uncredited)
- Bakuchi-uchi: Inochi-huda (1971)
- Kamen Rider (1971–1972, TV Series) as Dr. Shinigami "Ikadevil"
- Return of Ultraman (1971, TV Series)
- 'Gekido no showashi: Okinawa kessen (1971) as Okinawa Regional Officer
- Shussho iwai (aka The Wolves) (1971)
- Kamen Rider vs. Shocker (1972) as Dr. Shinigami
- Henshin Ninja arashi (1972, TV Series) as Satan
- Kamen Rider V3 (1973, TV Series) as Dr. Shinigami
- Rupan Sansei: Nenriki chin sakusen (1974) as Assassin at Orphanage
- Ultraman Leo (1974, TV Series) as Dodole / Alien Sarin
- Tokkan (1975)
- Space Ironman Kyodain (1976–1977) as Dr. Kaido
- Kaiketsu Zubat (1977, TV series, Episode 1.2)
- Chiisana supaman Ganbaron (1977, TV Series)
- Goranger Versus JAKQ (1978) as General Sahara
- Message from Space (1978) as Mother Dark
- Buru Kurisumasu (1978)

=== 1980s ===
- Misuta, Misesu, Misu Ronri (1980) as Ryuichi Shimomura
- Uchuu Keiji Gavan (1982) as Archbishop/Foreman (a human form of Anahori Doubler)
- Seiun Kamen Machineman (1984, TV Series) as Prof. K
- Saraba hakobune (1984) as Key maker
- Mahjong horoki (1984) as Hachimaki
- The Red Spectacles (1987) as Moongaze Ginji
- Kaitô Ruby (1988)
- Bungakusho satsujin jiken: Oinaru jyoso (1989)

=== 1990s ===
- Hong Kong Paradise (1990)
- Ronin-gai (1990) as Biwa player
- Youkai tengoku: Ghost Hero (1990)
- Daiyukai (1991) as Kushida
- Kamitsukitai/Dorakiyura yori ai-0 (1991) as Servant
- The Female Warriors (1991)
- Shorishatachi (1992)
- Za kakuto oh (1993)
- Street Fighter II: The Movie (1994) as Ken and Ryu's Master (voice) (later established in the series as Goken)
- Edogawa Rampo gekijo: Oshie to tabisuru otoko (1994)
- Weather Woman (1995)
- Eko eko azaraku II (1996) as Master of Saiga
- Otenki-oneesan (1996) as Chairman Shimamori
- Moon Spiral (1996, TV series) as Tōru
- Mikeneko hoomuzu no tasogare hoteru (1998) as Akaishi
- Efu (1998)

=== 2000s ===
- Keizoku/eiga (2000)
- Sweet Sweet Ghost (2000) as Yasuri
- Hakata Movie: Chinchiromai (2000) as God Computer
- Sebunzu feisu (2000) as Katsuda
- Oshikiri (2000)
- Vengeance for Sale (2002)
- Godzilla, Mothra and King Ghidorah: Giant Monsters All-Out Attack (2001) as Prof. Hirotoshi Isayama the Prophet (final film role)
- Kamen Rider The First (2005) as Dr. Shinigami (archive footage, overdubbed by Eiji Maruyama)
