= Kihachi Okamoto =

Japanese film director (1924–2005)

- Born: February 17, 1924; Yonago, Tottori, Japan
- Died: February 19, 2005 (aged 81); Kawasaki, Kanagawa, Japan
- Occupations: Film director, screenwriter

Kihachi Okamoto (岡本 喜八, Okamoto Kihachi; February 17, 1924 – February 19, 2005) was a Japanese film director who worked in several different genres.

== Career ==
Born in Yonago, Okamoto attended Meiji University, but was drafted into the Air Force 1943 and entered World War II, an experience that had a profound effect on his later film work, one third of which dealt with war. Finally graduating after the war, he entered the Toho studies in 1947 and worked as an assistant under such directors as Mikio Naruse, Masahiro Makino, Ishirō Honda, and Senkichi Taniguchi. He made his debut as a director in 1958 with All About Marriage.

Okamoto directed almost 40 films and wrote the scripts for at least 24, in a career that spanned almost six decades. He worked in a variety of genres, but most memorably in action genres such as the jidaigeki and war films. He was known for making films with a twist. Inspired to become a filmmaker after watching John Ford's Stagecoach, he would insert elements of the Western in war films like Desperado Outpost (1959) and Westward Desperado (1960), and eventually even filmed his own samurai Western in East Meets West (1995). A fan of musicals, he made over-the-top films such as Oh Bomb (1964), a gangster Noh musical, and Dixieland Daimyo (1986), about jazz musicians entering Bakumatsu Japan. Over all, he took on "a very rhythmic approach to filming and editing action sequences. Carefully timed placement of sound effects and music combined with camera movement and movement within the frame to form a very rhythmic, almost musical whole." His basically critical stance towards Japanese society led him to often pursue satire and black comedy, with his The Age of Assassins (1967) becoming so dark and absurd, Toho initially refused to release it.

Okamoto could also be serious. His samurai films, such as Samurai Assassin (1965), starring Toshiro Mifune, about a group of 19th century political agitators planning to kill an important government official, The Sword of Doom (1966), or Kill! (1968), were often critical of bushidō and Tokugawa period Japan. Yet he approached this critique from his own perspective. Toho entrusted him with the epic Japan's Longest Day (1968), a cinematic version of what happened to official Japan at the end of the war, but the next year he also made The Human Bullet for Art Theatre Guild, a more personal and satirical vision of an everyman's experience of World War II. To pursue some of his projects, Okamoto formed Okamoto Productions. His wife, Mineko Okamoto, often worked as producer on his later works.

He won the 1992 Japan Academy Prize for Director of the Year for Rainbow Kids. Alongside Akira Kurosawa, Okamoto was also a candidate for directing the Japanese sequences for Tora! Tora! Tora! (1970) but instead Kinji Fukasaku and Toshio Masuda were chosen.

On February 19, 2005, just two days after his 81st birthday, Okamoto died at home from esophageal cancer.

A photograph of Okamoto was used to portray the character of Goro Maki in the 2016 film Shin Godzilla, which was directed by Hideaki Anno, a self-professed fan of Okamoto.

== Selected filmography ==
Title	Romanization	Release date	Notes
All About Marriage 結婚のすべて	Kekon no Subete	1958	
The Big Boss 暗黒街の顔役	Ankokugai no kaoyaku	1959	
Desperado Outpost 独立愚連隊	Dokuritsu Gurentai	1959	
Ankokugai no Taiketsu 暗黒街の対決	Ankokugai no Taiketsu	1959	
Westward Desperado 独立愚連隊西へ	Dokuritsu Gurentai Nishi e	1960	
Blueprint of Murder 暗黒街の弾痕	Ankokugai no Dankon	1961	
Warring Clans 戦国野郎	Sengoku Yarō	1963	
The Elegant Life of Mr. Everyman 江分利満氏の優雅な生活	Eburiman-shi no yūgana seikatsu	1963	
Oh Bomb ああ爆弾	Aa! Bakudan	1964	
Samurai Assassin 侍	Samurai	1965	
Blood and Sand 血と砂	Chi to Suna	1965	
The Sword of Doom 大菩薩峠	Daibosatsu Tōge	1966	
The Age of Assassins 殺人狂時代	Satsujinkyō jidai	1967	
Japan's Longest Day 日本のいちばん長い日	Nihon no Ichiban Nagaihi	1967	
Kill! 斬る	Kiru	1968	
The Human Bullet 肉弾	Nikudan	1968	
Red Lion 赤毛	Akage	1969	
Zatoichi Meets Yojimbo 座頭市と用心棒	Zatōichi to Yōjinbō	1970	
Battle of Okinawa 激動の昭和史 沖縄決戦	Gekidō no Shōwashi: Okinawa Kessen	1971	
Aoba Shigereru 青葉繁れる	Aoba Shigereru	1974	
Tokkan 吶喊	Tokkan	1975	
Sugata Sanshirō 姿三四郎	Sugata Sanshirō	1977	
Science Ninja Team Gatchaman: The Movie 科学忍者隊ガッチャマン 劇場版	Kagaku Ninjatai Gatchaman	1978	Executive producer
Blue Christmas ブルークリスマス	Burū Kurisimasu	1978	
At This Late Date, the Charleston 近頃なぜかチャールストン	Chikagoro Nazeka Charleston	1981	
Dixieland Daimyo ジャズ大名	Jazu daimyō	1986	
Rainbow Kids 大誘拐	Daiyukai	1991	
East Meets West		1995	
Vengeance for Sale 助太刀屋助六	Sukedachi ya Sukeroku	2002	Final work

== Appearance ==
- Shin Godzilla (2016) as Goro Maki (stock photo double)
