= Reiko Oshida =

Japanese actress and singer

- Born: 大信田礼子 (Reiko Oshida); September 15, 1948 (age 77); Kyoto, Japan
- Other name: Reiko Ooshida
- Occupations: Actor, singer

Reiko Oshida (大信田礼子) is a Japanese actress and singer.

== Early life ==
On September 15, 1948, Oshida was born in Kyoto City, Japan.

== Career ==
Oshida's career started after winning the 1966 International Teen Princess pageant (held in Chicago, Illinois). This led to a role in the Daiei Studios film School for Thieves (Kigeki: dôrobô gakkô, 1968). She subsequently appeared in all four of Toei Company's Delinquent Girl Boss films.

Unusually for a pink film actress, Oshida did not appear nude in any of her films. After the pink film's heyday of the 1970s passed, Oshida continued to appear in other roles. Her most recent appearance was in the 2005 film Satoru: Fourteen (Shonen to hoshi to jitensha).

In the 1970s, Oshida was a kayōkyoku singer.

== Selected filmography ==
- School for Thieves (Kigeki: dōrobō gakkō, 1968)
- Playgirl (1969–76)
- Crimson Bat - Oichi: Wanted, Dead or Alive (Mekurano Oichi inochi moraimasu, 1970)
- Delinquent Girl Boss: Blossoming Night Dreams (Yume Wa Yoru Hirakua aka Tokyo Bad Girls / ずべ公番長 夢は夜ひらく, 1970)
- Delinquent Girl Boss: Tokyo Drifters (Zubekô banchô: Tokyo Nagaremono aka Girl Vagrants of Tokyo / ずべ公番長 東京流れ者, 1970)
- Delinquent Girl Boss: Ballad Of Yokohama Hoods (Zubekô banchô: Hamagure Kazoe Uta / ずべ公番長 はまぐれ数え唄, 1971)
- Delinquent Girl Boss: Worthless to Confess (Zubekô banchô: zange no neuchi mo nai / ずべ公番長 ざんげの値打もない, 1971)
- Oretachi wa Tenshi da! (1979) Episode14
- Jealousy Game (1982)
- Nemuri Kyoshirou TV Series (Bad Girl Wanna be - Arai Chapter - Akujo shigan! Binan ken - Arai no maki) 1982-
- Mayumi: Virgin Terrorist (Mayumi, 1990)
- Jigoru koppu: roppongi Akasaka bishoinen kurabu (1990)
- Satoru: Fourteen (Shonen to hoshi to jitensha, 2005)
