= Sun Scarred =

2006 Japanese thriller film

- Directed by: Takashi Miike
- Written by: Toshimichi Ohkawa
- Produced by: Kōzō Tadokoro
- Cinematography: Masato Kaneko
- Edited by: Yasushi Shimamura
- Music by: Kōji Endō
- Release date: 2006
- Running time: 120 minutes
- Country: Japan
- Language: Japanese

Sun Scarred (太陽の傷, Taiyo no kizu) is a 2006 Japanese film directed by Takashi Miike.

== Plot ==
Katayama (Show Aikawa) is on the way home to his wife and little daughter when he stumbles on a gang of punks beating up an innocent man. Katamaya decides to help the stranger and surprisingly wins the fight. This turns out to be a bad decision as his daughter is kidnapped and murdered by the leader of the same band of young thugs. Katayama seeks revenge and tries to seek out the gang's location.

== Cast ==
- Show Aikawa
- Aiko Satō
- Kenichi Endō
- Sei Hiraizumi
- Hiroshi Katsuno
- Toru Kazama
- Yutaka Matsushige
- Yasukaze Motomiya
- Chikage Natsuyama
- Kōichirō Takami
- Shin Takuma
- Miho Yoshioka

== Other credits ==
- Produced by:
  - Yasuko Natsuyama: executive producer
  - Kōzō Tadokoro: producer
- Casting by: Makiko Natsuyama
- Art Direction by: Akira Sakamoto
- Production Manager: Susumu Ejima
- Special Effects supervisor: Kaori Ohtagaki
