= Daitokai Series =

- Genre: Detective drama
- Written by: Sō Kuramoto(First season)
- Directed by: Toshio Masuda; Koreyoshi Kurahara; Tōru Murakawa; Yasuharu Hasebe; Keiichi Ozawa
- Starring: Tetsuya Watari; Kei Satō; Akira Terao; Joe Shishido; Masaki Kanda; Sei Hiraizumi; Kaku Takashina; Akiko Nishina; Yūsuke Takita; Yusaku Matsuda; Yujiro Ishihara; Isao Tamagawa; Shizuo Chujo; Kōjirō Kusanagi; Takehiko Ono; Go Awazu; Hiroshi Yagyu; Ryuta Mine; Shunsuke Kariya; Asao Koike; Munenori Oyamada; Masato Hoshi; Junichi Takagi
- Narrated by: Kiyoshi Kobayashi
- Opening theme: Masato Sugimoto (Part 2)
- Country of origin: Japan
- Original language: Japanese
- No. of seasons: 3
- No. of episodes: 132

Production
- Executive producer: Yujiro Ishihara
- Producers: Masahiko Kobayashi; Tsuyoshi Yamaguchi
- Camera setup: Mitsuji Kanau
- Running time: 45 minutes
- Production companies: Ishihara promotion NTV

Original release
- Network: NTV
- Release: January 6, 1976 – September 11, 1979

Daitokai (大都会, The Big City or Metropolis) was a popular prime-time television detective series in Japan, which ran from 1976 to 1979 for a total of 132 episodes and three seasons, each with its own story arc. The lead star was Tetsuya Watari. The drama won popularity and was followed by Seibu Keisatsu.

== Plot ==
Sergeant Raisuke Kuroiwa (Tetsuya Watari) and the Kuroiwa Force, a special Flying Squad-esque division of the Tokyo Metropolitan Police solves crimes and cracks down on their perpetrators.

== Cast ==
Daitokai Tatakai no Hibi (31 episodes)

- Tetsuya Watari as Raisuke Kuroiwa (Kuro-san)
- Yujiro Ishihara as Ryuta Takigawa (Baku-san)
- Akiko Nishina as Keiko Kuroiwa
- Kei Satō as Yukio Fukamachi
- Isao Tamagawa as Mitsuhiko Ishiki
- Shizuo Chujo as Otokichi Kagami
- Kaku Takashina as Yonezo Maruyama
- Takehiko Ono as Tadashi Ouchi (Bousan)
- Kōjirō Kusanagi as Goichi Takagi
- Go Awazu as Haruo Hirahara
- Akira Terao as Akira Hidaka
- Masaki Kanda as Koji Kujo
- Joe Shishido as Junichiro Matsukawa
- Sei Hiraizumi as Akihiko Okubo
- Hiroko Shino as Naoko Miura
- Hiroshi Yagyu as Kiuchi

Daitokai Part II (52 episodes)

- Tetsuya Watari as Raisuke Kuroiwa (Kuro-san)
- Yusaku Matsuda as Isao Tokuyoshi (Toku)
- Kaku Takashina as Yonezo Maruyama
- Masaki Kanda as Sotaro Kami (episode 14-52)
- Ryuta Mine as Iwao Kamijo (Saru)
- Go Awazu as Haruo Hirahara (episode 1-13)
- Takehiko Ono as Tadashi Ouchi (Bōsan)
- Shunsuke Kariya as Hyosuke Miyamoto (Benkei)
- Asao Koike as Tsutomu Yoshioka
- Akiko Nishina as Keiko Kuroiwa (episode 1-8,19)
- Yūsuke Takita as Kiyori Yamamoto
- Kei Satō as Yukio Fukamachi
- Yujiro Ishihara as Goro Munakata
- Mitsuko Oka as Nurse Kyōko Yoshino
- Munenori Oyamada as Tsutomu Takei
- Isao Tamagawa as Tamotsu Kajiyama

Daitokai Part III (49 episodes)

- Tetsuya Watari as Raisuke Kuroiwa (Kuro-san)
- Akira Terao as Jiro Makino
- Masato Hoshi as Isao Torada
- Takehiko Ono as Tadashi Ouchi (Bō-san)
- Kaku Takashina as Yonezo Maruyama
- Ryuta Mine as Iwao Kamijo
- Shunsuke Kariya as Hyosuke Miyamoto (Benkei)
- Yujiro Ishihara as Goro Munakata
- Junichi Takagi as Otokichi Kagawa

== Insert songs ==
- Part II

"Hitori" by Tetsuya Watari.

- Part III

"Higure Zaka" by Tetsuya Watari.
