= Edo Jō Tairan =

1991 film

- Film poster
- Directed by: Toshio Masuda
- Screenplay by: Koji Takada
- Starring: Hiroki Matsukata; Yukiyo Toake; Tomokazu Miura; Tokuma Nishioka; Masaki Kanda; Kenichi Kaneda; Shinobu Sakagami; Kimiko Ikegami; Tappie Shimokawa; Shigeru Kōyama; Takeshi Katō; Sei Hiraizumi; Nobuo Kaneko; Tetsuro Tamba
- Music by: Shin’ichirō Ikebe
- Distributed by: Toei; Fuji TV
- Release date: December 14, 1991 (Japan)
- Running time: 114 minutes
- Country: Japan
- Language: Japanese

Edo Jō Tairan (Japanese: 江戸城大乱; lit. Rebellion at Edo Castle), also known as The Great Shogunate Battle, is a 1991 Japanese jidaigeki film directed by Toshio Masuda. The film depicts political conflict during the Tokugawa shogunate.

== Plot ==
The 4th Tokugawa Shogun Tokugawa Ietsuna has no children, so a power dispute occurs over his succession.

== Cast ==
- Hiroki Matsukata : Sakai Tadakiyo
- Yukiyo Toake : Keishōuinn
- Tomokazu Miura : Hotta Masatoshi
- Tokuma Nishioka : Shibozawa
- Masaki Kanda : Tokugawa Tsunashige
- Kenichi Kaneda : Tokugawa Ietsuna
- Shinobu Sakagami : Tokugawa Tsunayoshi
- Kimiko Ikegami : Oei
- Mami Nomura :
- Tappie Shimokawa : Wakabayashi
- Shigeru Kōyama : Tokugawa Mitsusada
- Takeshi Katō : Inaba Masanori
- Sei Hiraizumi : Mera Genzō
- Ken Nishida
- Shun Ōide : Makino Narisada
- Shinjirō Ehara : Ōkubo Tadatomo
- Nobuo Kaneko : Tokugawa Mitsutomo
- Tetsuro Tamba : Tokugawa Mitsukuni
