= Keisuke Sagawa =

Japanese actor (1937–2017)

- 砂川 啓介
- Born: Keiichi Yamashita (山下 啓一); February 12, 1937; Fukagawa Ward, Tokyo City, Tokyo Prefecture, Japan
- Died: July 11, 2017 (aged 80); Minato, Tokyo, Japan
- Resting place: Taiun-ji Temple, Shibuya Ward
- Occupations: Actor; tarento
- Years active: 1954–2017
- Notable work: Okaasan to Issho as Taisō no Onīsan
- Spouse: Nobuyo Ōyama (m. 1964–2017)

Keisuke Sagawa (砂川 啓介, Sagawa Keisuke; February 12, 1937 – July 11, 2017) was a Japanese actor and tarento.

He is notable for being the first actor of the Taisō no Onīsan in the Uta no Ehon program on the long-running television program Okaasan to Issho. His wife was actress, television personality, and voice actress Nobuyo Ōyama.

== Biography ==
=== Career ===
While attending Seijo High School, he made appearances in numerous socialist films such as Ashizuri Misaki. After graduation he entered Eguchi Dance Institute and studied modern dance and the fundamentals of acting.

In 1961, he became the first actor to portray the Taisō no Onīsan in the Uta no Ehon program on Okaasan to Issho.

In February 1964, Sagawa married Nobuyo Ōyama after working with her on-stage in the play Son Goku. At the time they got married, she was a voice actor in the puppet show Boo-Foo-Woo on Okaasan to Issho, but since it was a different program from Sagawa's Uta no Ehon, they hardly ever got to meet behind the scenes.

Despite being married, they never had any children, as they lost their first child, a son, to stillbirth and their second child, a daughter named Erika, to lung and heart disease after only 3 months.

As a successor to Yukio Aoshima and Kokontei Shinba VIII in Ohiru no Wide Show, Sagawa served as a presenter in various fields. He appeared on the stage of Fuji Theater in 1985 and since then was active as an actor as well as in lecture activities.

In 1988, co-authored with Ōyama, the cookbook Keisuke-Nobuyo no Omoshiro Sōzai 170 was published by Shufunotomosha and became a best-seller, selling more than a million copies, and in 1991 they co-authored and released a follow-up entitled Keisuke-Nobuyo no Omoshiro Shukō.

In 2001, he published Kamisan ha Doraemon, a book about Ōyama's daily life as she suffered from cancer that year and the caregiving she received during that time.

In May 2009, he appeared in NHK Educational TV's 50th anniversary commemorative special program ETV50: Kodomo no Hi Special -Do Mitai Kyōiku TV Dai 2-dan- (Namahōsō) Okaasan to Issho as the first generation Taisō no Onīsan for the first time in about 40 years in costume and showed exercise gymnastics with the song "Genki ni Ichi, Ni".

=== Final years ===
In 2013, Sagawa announced that he had undergone surgery for early stage stomach cancer, but did not undergo chemotherapy.

On May 13, 2015, Sagawa publicly announced that his wife Ōyama was suffering from dementia and that he would be taking care of her, but a year later, while caring for Ōyama, Sagawa was diagnosed with kidney cancer so moved her to live at a facility to receive treatment for his illness.

In May 2017, Sagawa was hospitalized, and was readmitted the next month after suffering a cerebral infarction.

=== Death ===
Sagawa died from ureteral cancer on July 11, 2017, at the age of 80.

Ōyama visited him several times while he was in the hospital, but was unable to make it in time for his final moments before death. Although she served as the chief mourner, she did not attend his wake or funeral due to her dementia.

Following his hospitalization, Sagawa entrusted his affairs to his, and his wife's, manager Akiko Kobayashi. Ōyama continued to live at the facility while the management of their now-ownerless home was being handled by a tax accountant from Tokyo.

Years later following Sagawa's death, his wife Ōyama died of senility on September 29, 2024, at the age of 90.

== Filmography ==
=== Television ===
Year	Title	Role	Network	Notes	Ref.
1961–1969	Okaasan to Issho	Taisō no Onīsan	NHK	First Taisō no Onīsan	
1962–1963	Pilot: Star Present		CX	Moderator	
1964	Tōshiba Michiyō Gekijō Otokodearitai		TBS		
1967	Idjiwaru Bāsan		YTV		
1969	Sign wa V		TBS	Episode 32 guest	
1970	Osana Zuma		TX	Episode 8 guest (co-starred with Nobuyo Ōyama)	
1972	Barom-1	Matsugoro Kido	YTV		
1972	Henshin Ninja: Arashi	Tomekichi	MBS	Episode 5 "Kyōfu! Neko Mandala!!"	
	Ashita no Hanayome				
	Ohiru no Wide Show		NTV		
1986	Keisuke Sagawa: Ima! Asadesu		TBS		
1986	Hōigaku Kyōshitsu no Nagai Ichinichi		NTV		
1993	Hanshichitori Monochō	Torakichi	NTV	Produced by Union Movie; Ep. 15 "Beranmē Ojōsama!"	
	Īizumitsuketa				
2009	ETV50: Kodomo no Hi Special -Do Mitai Kyōiku TV Dai 2-dan-		NHK		
	Dongurion Gakukai		CBC	Moderator	
2015	Doraemon, Haha ni Naru ~Ōyama Nobuyo Monogatari~		NHK BS Premium	Cooperation and interview coverage	

=== Radio ===
Title	Network
Keisuke Sagawa no Mimi Komi Lunchtime	TBS Radio

=== Stage ===
Title	Production
The Three Musketeers	Fuji Theater
The Wonderful Wizard of Oz	Fuji Theater
The Adventures of Tom Sawyer	Fuji Theater

=== Films ===
Year	Title	Role	Distributor
1969	Conte 55-gō: Ore wa Ninja no Mago no Mago	Newscaster	Toho
1969	Conte 55-gō: Uchū Dai Bōken	Commentator	Toho

== Discography ==
Song
Otsu kai ari-san
Ahiru no Gyōretsu
Ore wa Tobu

== Bibliography ==
Date	Title	Co-author	Publisher	ISBN
Apr 1988	Keisuke-Nobuyo no Omoshiro Sōzai 170: Fui no Raikyaku, Kakei no Pinchi ni Yasukute Umai Speed Ryōri	Nobuyo Ōyama	Graph Corporation	ISBN 9784079256728
Aug 1991	Keisuke-Nobuyo no Omoshiro Shukō: 5-25-Bu o Matase Time-tsuki	Nobuyo Ōyama	Graph Corporation	ISBN 9784079377416
Oct 2001	Kamisan wa Doraemon		Futabasha	ISBN 9784575292954
Oct 2015	Musume ni natta Tsuma, Nobuyo e Nobuyo Ōyama "Ninshishō" Kaigo Nikki		Futabasha	ISBN 9784575309553
