= Ben Hiura =

Japanese actor and voice actor

- Born: January 25, 1943 (age 83); Tokyo, Japan
- Occupations: Actor, voice actor
- Years active: 1960s–present
- Children: Akaneko Hiura
- Website: https://www.seinenza-eihou.com/profile-1/eihou-m/hiura-b/

Ben Hiura (樋浦勉, Hiura Ben; born Tsutomu Hiura (樋浦勉, Hiura Tsutomu), January 25, 1943) is a Japanese actor and voice actor affiliated with the Seinenza Theater Company. Hiura is known for dubbing over Bruce Willis, Richard Dreyfuss, John Malkovich, Joe Pesci, and many more.

== Filmography ==
=== Films ===
- Goyokin (1969) – Rokuzo
- Fuji sanchō (1970) – A Man
- Mount Hakkoda (1977) – Sato
- Eijanaika (1981)
- The Ballad of Narayama (1983)
- Itazu Kuma (1987)
- Tōki Rakujitsu (1992)
- Zatōichi (2003)
- Ryuzo and the Seven Henchmen (2015) – Ichizō
- Crazy Samurai Musashi (2020)

=== Television drama ===
- Ultraman (1966) – A Truck driver
- Tokugawa Ieyasu (1983) – Hattori Hanzō
- Sanga Moyu (1984)
- Edo o Kiru (1994)
- Shinsengumi Keppūroku (1998)
- Kamen Rider Hibiki (2005)
- Kamen Rider W (2010)
- Sanada Maru (2016) – Ōsumi Yozaemon

=== Television animation ===
- Lupin the 3rd Part II (1979) – Gabotto, Bakki
- Master Keaton (1999) – Kendoru
- Golgo 13 (2009) – Roy
- Gosick (2011) – Kazuya's father
- Danchi Tomoo (2013) – Kimifumi Hazama
- Your Lie in April (2014) – Junzō Ibata
- Ace Attorney (2016) – Judge
- One Piece (2017) – Zunisha

=== OVA ===
- Submarine 707R (2003) – Captain Yōhei Hayami

=== Video games ===
- Kingdom Hearts II (2005) – Banzai
- Project X Zone (2012) – Bruno Delinger
- Resident Evil: Revelations 2 (2015) – Evgeny Rebic
- Famicom Detective Club: The Girl Who Stands Behind (2021 Remake) (2021) – Zenzou Tanabe

=== Dubbing roles ===
==== Live-action ====
- Bruce Willis
  - Die Hard – John McClane
  - Die Hard 2 – John McClane
  - Hudson Hawk – Eddie 'Hudson Hawk' Hawkins
  - The Last Boy Scout – Joe Cornelius Hallenbeck
  - Death Becomes Her (1996 NTV edition) – Dr. Ernest Menville
  - Nobody's Fool – Carl Roebuck
  - North – Narrator, Easter Bunny, Gabby
  - 12 Monkeys – James Cole
  - Die Hard with a Vengeance – John McClane
  - Four Rooms – Leo
  - Bandits – Joe Blake
  - Hart's War – Colonel William A. McNamara
  - Hostage (2009 TV Asahi edition) – Police Chief Jeff Talley
  - Sin City – Det. John Hartigan
  - Live Free or Die Hard – John McClane
  - Catch .44 – Mel
  - A Good Day to Die Hard (2015 Collector's Box edition) – John McClane
  - The Prince – Omar
  - Sin City: A Dame to Kill For – John Hartigan
  - Extraction – Leonard Turner
  - Precious Cargo – Eddie Pilosa
  - Reprisal – James
  - Breach – Clay Young
  - Deadlock – Ron Whitlock
  - A Day to Die – Alston
  - Wrong Place – Frank Richards
  - Wire Room – Shane Mueller
- Richard Dreyfuss
  - Jaws (1981 NTV edition) – Matt Hooper
  - Close Encounters of the Third Kind (1982 TV Asahi edition) – Roy Neary
  - The Goodbye Girl (1982 TBS edition)– Elliot Garfield
  - The Big Fix (TBS edition) – Moses Wine
  - The Buddy System (NTV edition) – Joe
  - Stand by Me (1989 Fuji TV edition) – The Writer
  - Stakeout (1994 NTV edition) – Det. Chris Lecce
  - Always (VHS, DVD and Blu-ray and 1995 NTV editions) – Pete Sandich
  - Let It Ride (VHS edition) – Jay Trotter
  - Once Around – Sam Sharpe
  - Another Stakeout (1998 NTV edition) – Det. Chris Lecce
  - Mr. Holland's Opus (1997 TV Asahi edition) – Glenn Holland
  - The Crew – Bobby Bartellemeo
  - Fail Safe – The President
  - My Life in Ruins – Irv Gideon
  - Squatters – David
  - Audrey – Robert Dreyfuss
- Robert De Niro
  - Midnight Run – Jack Walsh
  - Cape Fear – Max Cady
  - Meet the Parents – Jack Tiberius Byrnes
  - Meet the Fockers – Jack Tiberius Byrnes
  - Stardust – Captain Shakespeare
  - Everybody's Fine – Frank Goode
  - Little Fockers – Jack Tiberius Byrnes
  - Killer Elite – Hunter
  - New Year's Eve – Stan Harris
  - Freelancers – Captain Joe Sarcone
  - The Big Wedding – Don Griffin
  - Killing Season – Benjamin Ford
  - The Bag Man – Dragna
  - Heist – Francis "The Pope" Silva
  - Hands of Stone – Ray Arcel
  - Killers of the Flower Moon – William King Hale
- John Malkovich
  - In the Line of Fire (1996 TV Asahi edition) – Mitch Leary
  - Con Air (2000 TV Asahi edition) – Cyrus "The Virus" Grissom
  - Burn After Reading – Osbourne Cox
  - Red – Marvin Boggs
  - Secretariat – Lucien Laurin
  - Red 2 – Marvin Boggs
  - Warm Bodies – Colonel Grigio
  - Deepwater Horizon – Donald Vidrine
  - Unlocked – Bob Hunter
  - Bullet Head – Walker
  - The New Pope – Pope John Paul III
- Joe Pesci
  - Lethal Weapon 2 (1993 TV Asahi edition) – Leo Getz
  - Home Alone (1998 TV Asahi edition) – Harry Lime
  - Home Alone 2: Lost in New York (1996 TV Asahi edition) – Harry Lime
  - Lethal Weapon 3 (1995 TV Asahi edition) – Leo Getz
  - Casino – Nicholas "Nicky" Santoro
  - Lethal Weapon 4 (2001 NTV and 2003 TV Asahi editions) – Leo Getz
  - The Irishman – Russell Bufalino
- Danny DeVito
  - Twins (1991 TV Asahi edition) – Vincent Benedict
  - Batman Returns – Oswald Cobblepot / Penguin
  - Jack the Bear – John Leary
  - Mars Attacks! – Rude Gambler
  - Matilda – Harry Wormwood
  - What's the Worst That Could Happen? – Max Fairbanks
- Gary Busey
  - Bulletproof (1990 TV Asahi edition) – Frank McBain
  - Predator 2 (1994 TV Asahi edition) – Peter Keyes
  - Point Break – Angelo Pappas
  - Under Siege – Commander Krill
  - The Rage (TV Tokyo edition) – Art Dacy
- Robin Williams
  - Awakenings – Dr. Malcolm Sayer
  - Hook – Peter Banning/Peter Pan
  - Good Will Hunting – Sean Maguire
  - The Final Cut – Alan Hakman
  - The Butler (2016 BS Japan edition) – Dwight D. Eisenhower
- 48 Hrs. (1985 NTV edition) – Albert Ganz (James Remar)
- The Adventures of Buckaroo Banzai Across the 8th Dimension – Dr. Emilio Lizardo (John Lithgow)
- Alien: The Director's Cut – Brett (Harry Dean Stanton)
- Assault on Precinct 13 (1980 TV Tokyo edition) – Lieutenant Ethan Bishop (Austin Stoker)
- Battlestar Galactica – Sire Uri (Ray Milland)
- Beverly Hills Cop II – Maxwell Dent (Jürgen Prochnow)
- Big Game – Herbert (Jim Broadbent)
- The Big Lebowski (Blu-Ray edition) – Jeffrey "The Big" Lebowski (David Huddleston)
- The Bodyguard – Mail Man (Yuen Wah)
- The Boondock Saints II: All Saints Day – Louie "The Roman" / "The Old Man" (Peter Fonda)
- Cool Runnings – Irving Blitzer (John Candy)
- CSI: Cyber – D.B. Russell (Ted Danson)
- The Empire Strikes Back (1980 Movie theater edition) – Lando Calrissian (Billy Dee Williams)
- Daddy's Home 2 – Don Whitaker (John Lithgow)
- Das Boot (1983 Fuji TV edition) – Chief Engineer (Klaus Wennemann)
- Dinosaurs – Earl Sinclair (Stuart Pankin)
- Doomsday – Marcus Kane (Malcolm McDowell)
- Dune – Baron Vladimir Harkonnen (Kenneth McMillan)
- Eraser (1999 NTV edition) – Johnny Casteleone (Robert Pastorelli)
- Falling Down – William "D-Fens" Foster (Michael Douglas)
- Forrest Gump (1998 NTV edition) – Lieutenant Dan Taylor (Gary Sinise)
- Getaway – Mysterious Voice (Jon Voight)
- Ghost Ship – Captain Sean Murphy (Gabriel Byrne)
- The Hard Way – Lieutenant John Moss (James Woods)
- Hatfields & McCoys – Jim Vance (Tom Berenger)
- The Haunted Mansion – Ezra (Wallace Shawn)
- The Hitcher (1987 TV Tokyo edition) – John Ryder (Rutger Hauer)
- Hobo with a Shotgun – Hobo (Rutger Hauer)
- House of Gucci – Aldo Gucci (Al Pacino)
- The Hudsucker Proxy – Sidney J. Mussburger (Paul Newman)
- Iceman: The Time Traveler – Hojo Shogun (Yasuaki Kurata)
- Insomnia – Will Dormer (Al Pacino)
- Internal Affairs – Officer Dennis Peck (Richard Gere)
- Kill Bill: Volume 2 – Johnny Mo (Gordon Liu)
- Kung Fu Hustle – The Landlord of the Pig Sty Alley (Yuen Wah)
- Marked for Death (1995 TV Asahi edition) – Screwface (Basil Wallace)
- Master with Cracked Fingers – Old Master (Yuen Siu-tien)
- The Matrix (2002 Fuji TV edition) – Cypher (Joe Pantoliano)
- Million Dollar Baby – Frankie Dunn (Clint Eastwood)
- Mission: Impossible – Eugene Kittridge (Henry Czerny)
- The Monkey King – Dragon King of the East Sea (Liu Hua)
- Natural Born Killers – Warden Dwight McClusky (Tommy Lee Jones)
- The Passage – Captain Von Berkow (Malcolm McDowell)
- Proud Mary – Benny (Danny Glover)
- Raiders of the Lost Ark (1993 DVD edition) – Major Arnold Toht (Ronald Lacey)
- Raising Cain – Dr. Carter Nix (John Lithgow)
- Rambo: First Blood Part II (1993 Fuji TV edition) – Marshall Murdock (Charles Napier)
- The Return of the Living Dead (1987 NTV edition) – Freddy (Thom Mathews)
- Return of the Living Dead Part II (1989 NTV edition) – Joey (Thom Mathews)
- Rogue One – Admiral Raddus
- Saaho – Narantak Roy (Jackie Shroff)
- Safe House – Harlan Whitford (Sam Shepard)
- Scarface (1989 TV Asahi edition) – Tony Montana (Al Pacino)
- Shooter – Colonel Isaac Johnson (Danny Glover)
- Superman III (1985 TV Asahi edition) – August "Gus" Gorman (Richard Pryor)
- Survivor – Bill Talbot (Robert Forster)
- The Sweeney – Detective Inspector Jack Regan (Ray Winstone)
- Taboo – Sir Stuart Strange (Jonathan Pryce)
- Tai Chi 0 – Grand Uncle (Stanley Fung)
- Tai Chi Hero – Grand Uncle (Stanley Fung)
- Teenage Mutant Ninja Turtles: Out of the Shadows – Splinter
- Total Recall (1992 TV Asahi edition) – Benny (Mel Johnson Jr.)
- True Lies – Salim Abu Aziz (Art Malik)
- A Walk in the Woods – Stephen Katz (Nick Nolte)
- The Young Master – Ah Suk (Fung Fung)

==== Animation ====
- Cars – Ramone
- Cars 2 – Ramone
- Cars 3 – Ramone
- Kung Fu Panda 3 – Master Shifu
- Kung Fu Panda 4 – Master Shifu
- The Lion King – Banzai
- Toy Story 2 – Al McWhiggin
- Trolls World Tour – King Thrash
