= Ryuzo and the Seven Henchmen =

- Theatrical release poster
- Directed by: Takeshi Kitano
- Written by: Takeshi Kitano
- Produced by: Takio Yoshida; Masayuki Mori
- Starring: Tatsuya Fuji; Masaomi Kondō; Akira Nakao; Tōru Shinagawa; Ben Hiura; Kōjun Itō; Ken Yoshizawa; Akira Onodera
- Cinematography: Katsumi Yanagishima
- Edited by: Takeshi Kitano; Yoshinori Ota
- Music by: Keiichi Suzuki
- Production company: Office Kitano
- Distributed by: Warner Bros. Pictures
- Release date: April 25, 2015 (Japan)
- Running time: 125 minutes
- Country: Japan
- Language: Japanese
- Box office: +US$10 million (Japan)

Ryuzo and the Seven Henchmen (Japanese: 龍三と七人の子分たち, Hepburn: Ryūzō to Shichinin no Kobuntachi), also known as Ryuzo 7, is a 2015 Japanese action comedy film directed by Takeshi Kitano. It was released on April 25, 2015.

== Plot ==
Ryuzo (Tatsuya Fuji) is a retired yakuza gangster who lives a quiet unassuming life with his salaryman son, Ryuhei (Masanobu Katsumura). Still in contact with his former lieutenant, Masa (Masaomi Kondō), Ryuzo maintains his short temper with their regular get-togethers. One day, the old gangster receives a call from an impostor pretending to be his son asking for ¥5 million. Ryūzō sees through the trick and learns from police detective Murakami (Beat Takeshi) that a member from the Keihin Rengo gang is responsible. Re-uniting his seven former henchmen to strike back, Ryūzō learns that they have all grown weak with their old age. The elderly yakuza members soon learn that they must overcome their weaknesses if they are to prove to be a match against the younger Keihin Rengo.

== Cast ==
- Tatsuya Fuji as Ryuzo
- Masaomi Kondō as Masa
- Akira Nakao as Mokichi
- Tōru Shinagawa as Mac
- Ben Hiura as Ichizō
- Kōjun Itō as Hide
- Ken Yoshizawa as Taka
- Akira Onodera as Yasu
- Masanobu Katsumura as Ryuhei
- Hisako Manda as Hostess
- Beat Takeshi as Murakami
- Ken Yasuda as Nishi

== Reception ==
The film earned ¥184.66 million on its opening weekend in Japan. By May 17, the film had grossed over US$10 million. In a review for The Japan Times, Mark Schilling applauded Tatsuya Fuji for his performance of Ryuzo, stating, "Though looking every one of his 74 real-life years, Fuji brings a volatile energy to proceedings that would otherwise be merely absurd... when he starts raging against the dying of the light, look out for flying debris — and prepare to laugh."
