= Masaki Kanda =

Japanese actor

- Born: December 21, 1950 (age 75); Tokyo, Japan
- Occupation: Actor
- Years active: 1976–present
- Spouse: Seiko Matsuda (m. 1985; div. 1997)
- Children: Sayaka Kanda

Masaki Kanda (Japanese: 神田 正輝, Hepburn: Kanda Masaki; born December 21, 1950) is a Japanese actor. He is well known for his role as Doc (Akira Saijō in Taiyō ni Hoero!). His ex-wife is singer Seiko Matsuda and their daughter was actress Sayaka Kanda.

== Biography ==
Kanda was born on December 21, 1950, in Tokyo.

He was recruited by actor Yujiro Ishihara and made his television debut in 1976 with Daitokai Tatakai no Hibi.

He married singer Seiko Matsuda in 1985, and they had a daughter, Sayaka Kanda, before their divorce in 1997.

== Selected filmography ==
=== Television ===
- Daitokai Tatakaino Hibi (1976)
- Daitokai Part II (1977) as Jin Sotaro
- Oretachi wa Tenshi da! (1979) as Serizawa Jun
- Taiyō ni Hoero!(1980–86) as Saijō Akira (Doc)
- Onihei Hankachō (1992) episode 2
- Akai Reikyusha Series (1994-2023) as Haruhiko Kurosawa
- Wataru Seken wa Oni Bakari (2000, 2002)
- Seibu Keisatsu Special (2004) as Makoto Suzuki
- Mito Kōmon (2011) Final episode
- Downtown Rocket (2018)

=== Film ===
- Caribe: Symphony of Love (1985)
- Edo Jō Tairan (1991)

=== Culture Program ===
- Asada! Namadesu Tabisarada (1997–present) Host
