= Taiyō ni Hoero! =

Japanese television series

- Genre: Detective drama
- Starring: Yujiro Ishihara; Tetsuya Watari; Shigeru Tsuyuguchi; Raita Ryū; Kenichi Hagiwara; Yūsaku Matsuda; Hiroshi Katsuno; Masaya Oki; Masaki Kanda; Shinji Yamashita; Toru Watanabe; Kunihiko Mitamura; Masanori Sera; Takeo Chii; Tappei Shimokawa; Yoshizumi Ishihara; Akira Onodera; Keiko Takahashi; Jun Miyauchi; Ryo Kinomoto
- Composer: Katsuo Ōno
- Country of origin: Japan
- Original language: Japanese
- No. of episodes: 718

Production
- Producer: Hirokichi Okada
- Running time: 45 minutes
- Production company: Toho Co., Ltd.

Original release
- Network: NNS (NTV)
- Release: July 21, 1972 – November 14, 1986

Taiyō ni Hoero! (太陽にほえろ!), lit. 'Roar at the Sun!', was a long-running prime-time television detective series in Japan, which ran from 1972 to 1986 for a total of 718 episodes. The lead star was Yujiro Ishihara. It also helped further the career of actors such as Yūsaku Matsuda and Kenichi Hagiwara as well as Hiroshi Katsuno and Masaya Oki. It was a police procedural set mostly in a police station. It was one of the most popular and iconic detective dramas in Japanese television history. A sequel was aired from 1986 to 1987, airing for 12 episodes.

== Setting ==
The series takes place in the fictional Nanamagari police station in Shinjuku and portrays the investigations of Nanamagari's detective squad. Headed by Superintendent Shunsuke "Boss" Todo, it initially consists of Inspector Seiichi "Yama-san" Yamamura with Detectives Makoto "Gori-san" Ishizuka, Kimiyuki "Denka (His Highness)" Shima, Taro "Chosan" Nozaki, and Policewoman Shinko "Shinko-san" Uchida. In the first episode they were joined by Detective Jun "Macaroni" Hayami, who dies in Episode 52. Macaroni was replaced by Jun "Jiipan" Shibata, who dies in Episode 111. These episodes started a series tradition of killing off characters when the actors who play them depart from the show. The television drama garnered high viewer ratings, especially for episodes where regular cast members were killed off.

While the metropolis of Tokyo is the Nanamagari squad's usual jurisdiction area, sometimes they are assigned cases that take them to various other locations across Japan, such as Okinawa and Sakurajima. Other cases involve the overseas travel of Nanamagari squad detectives to prosecute fugitives in Hawaii, Paris, Canada, and Australia.

== Regulars ==
Character	Nickname	Actor	Episodes
Shunsuke Todo	Boss	Yujiro Ishihara	1 - 458, 489 - 699, 718
Seiichi Yamamura	Yama-san	Shigeru Tsuyuguchi	1 - 691
Makoto Ishizuka	Gori-san	Raita Ryū	1 - 525
Kimiyuki Shima	Denka ("His Highness")	Akira Onodera	1 - 414
Taro Nozaki	Chō-san ("Pops")	Tappei Shimokawa	1 - 520
Nobuko Uchida	Shinko	Keiko Takahashi	1 - 111
Jun Hayami	Macaroni	Kenichi Hagiwara	1 - 52
Jun Shibata	Jiipan ("Jeans")	Yūsaku Matsuda	53 - 111
Jun Mikami	Texas	Hiroshi Katsuno	112 - 216
Ryo Taguchi	Bonn	Jun Miyauchi	168 - 363
Ryuichi Taki	Scotch	Masaya Oki	217 - 244, 399 - 493
Hajime Iwaki	Rocky	Ryo Kinomoto	256 - 519
Jun Godai	Sneakers	Shinji Yamashita	364 - 476
Akira Saijo	Doc	Masaki Kanda	415 - 718
Junji Takemoto	Rugger	Toru Watanabe	477 - 658
Masayuki Hara	Gypsy	Kunihiko Mitamura	494 - 545
Hajime Kasukabe	Bogey	Masanori Sera	521 - 597
Toshizo Igawa	Toshi-san	Takeo Chii	526 - 718
Reiko Iwaki (née Hayase)	Mommy	Naomi Hase	275 - 520 (semi-regular), 546 - 718 (regular)
Makoto Sawamura	Blues	Seiji Matano	562 - 718
Yu Mizuki	Microcomputer	Yoshizumi Ishihara	618 (debut), 623 - 718 (regular)
Koichi Shimazu	Duke	Kenichi Kaneda	660 - 715
Jun Dazai	DJ	Koji Nishiyama	706 - 718
Hyogo Tachibana	Keibu ("Inspector")	Tetsuya Watari	706 - 718

=== Semi-regulars ===
- Yoko Machida as Takako Yamamura (Wife of Seiichi Yamamura) (1972–78)
- Kin Sugai as Taki Shibata (Mother of Jun Shibata) (1973–74, 78, 85)
- Takuya Fujioka as Samejima (1973–86)
- Akihiko Hirata as Nishiyama (1973–83)

=== Taiyō ni Hoero! Part 2 ===
Character	Nickname	Actor
Asako Tanamura	Kakarichō ("Chief")	Tomoko Naraoka
Akira Saijo	Doc	Masaki Kanda
Jun Dazai	DJ	Koji Nishiyama
Makoto Sawamura	Blues	Seiji Matano
Yu Mizuki	Microcomputer	Yoshizumi Ishihara
Reiko Iwaki	Mommy	Naomi Hase
Taro Nozaki	Cho-san	Tappei Shimokawa
Toshio Igawa	Toshi-san	Takeo Chii
Osamu Kita	Osamu-san	Akira Terao
