= Real Girl (manga) =

Japanese manga and its adaptations

- Cover of Real Girl volume 1 by Kodansha

3D彼女(リアルガール) (Riaru Gāru)
- Genre: Romantic comedy
- Manga
- Written by: Mao Nanami
- Published by: Kodansha
- English publisher: NA: Kodansha Comics
- Magazine: Dessert
- Original run: July 23, 2011 – May 24, 2016
- Volumes: 12
- Anime television series
- Directed by: Takashi Naoya
- Produced by: Atsushi Kirimoto; Hiroyuki Inage; Sota Yoshio; Shunsuke Matsumura; Gen Yagi; Keiko Tamaru
- Written by: Deko Akao
- Music by: Akiyoshi Yasuda
- Studio: Hoods Entertainment
- Licensed by: NA: Sentai Filmworks
- Original network: NTV (AnichU)
- Original run: April 4, 2018 – March 26, 2019
- Episodes: 24
- Live-action film
- Real Girl

Real Girl (3D彼女(リアルガール), Riaru Gāru), is a Japanese manga series written and illustrated by Mao Nanami. The series was serialized in Kodansha's Dessert between July 2011 and May 2016, with the series later being compiled into twelve tankōbon volumes released between December 2011 and August 2016. The series is currently published digitally in English by Kodansha Comics. An anime television series adaptation directed by Takashi Naoya and animated by Hoods Entertainment aired from April 4 to June 20, 2018, on AnichU programming block. A second season aired from January 8 to March 26, 2019.

== Plot ==
High-school student Hikari Tsutsui is unpopular with classmates for his otaku behavior. One day, he is assigned to pool cleaning duty for being late and is paired with the beautiful but unreputable troublemaker Iroha Igarashi. When Iroha asks if he would like to be in a relationship with her, Hikari turns her down at first, because he doesn't like her at all, but eventually agrees to give it a try. However, there is a catch: Iroha will be moving in six months because of her father's work and she will be transferring to another school.

== Characters ==
Iroha Igarashi (五十嵐 色葉, Igarashi Iroha)
Voiced by: Yu Serizawa (Japanese); Christina Kelly (English)
Portrayed by: Ayami Nakajo (live-action)
Iroha is a beautiful girl (considered by Yuto Ito and Sumie Ayado to be "the perfect 3D Girl") but is a well-known delinquent. She initially encounters Hikari after being assigned to clean the pool with him. She begins to like Hikari and eventually agrees to be his girlfriend but tells him she has to move away in six months. She takes the relationship seriously and stands up to those who look down on him and their relationship. It is later revealed that she has a brain tumor and requires surgery, later making her gain retrograde amnesia.

Hikari Tsutsui (筒井 光, Tsutsui Hikari)
Voiced by: Teppei Uenishi (Japanese); Nathan Wilson (English)
Portrayed by: Hayato Sano (live-action)
Hikari Tsutsui is third-year high school student who has been stigmatized by his classmates for being an otaku. As a result, he isolates himself from the rest, his only friend being the oddball and fellow otaku Yūto Itō. He initially disliked Iroha for being the personification of everything he disliked about 3D girls. Although he initially turned Iroha down, he decided to try a relationship with her.

Itō Yūto (伊東 悠人, Yūto Itō)
Voiced by: Shouta Aoi (Japanese); Daniel Regojo (English)
Portrayed by: Yutaro (live-action)
Hikari's best and only friend, who wears a cat-ear headband. He supports Hikari's relationship and hopes someday he too can develop a relationship.

Arisa Ishino (石野 ありさ, Ishino Arisa)
Voiced by: Minami Tsuda (Japanese); Olivia Swasey (English)
Portrayed by: Yuri Tsunematsu (live-action)
Arisa is Hikari and Iroha's classmate who is initially annoyed by Hikari, but is relied upon regularly to give Hikari relationship advice. At first she has a boyfriend, but when Hikari points out that he is taking advantage of her, Arisa eventually breaks up with him. She becomes friends with Hikari and Iroha, and when she meets Mitsuya for the first time, she instantly falls for him.

Mitsuya Takanashi (高梨 ミツヤ, Takanashi Mitsuya)
Voiced by: Takuma Terashima (Japanese); Adam Gibbs (English)
Portrayed by: Hiroya Shimizu (live-action)
Mitsuya is a popular guy in school, and has his eyes on Iroha. He cannot admit, though, that a guy like Hikari is her boyfriend. One day he sees Hikari helping his sister Anzu stand after falling; he tells her to scream, catching the attention of the police and branding Hikari as a lolicon for days. Iroha found out the truth later through Anzu herself, and they apologize to Hikari.

Sumie Ayado (綾戸 純恵, Ayado Sumie)
Voiced by: Reina Ueda (Japanese); Natalie Rial (English)
Portrayed by: Moka Kamishiraishi (live-action)
A clumsy, outspoken glasses-wearing girl who bumps into Hikari and is attracted to him as they share otaku interests. She also idolizes Iroha.

Ezomichi (えぞみち)
Voiced by: Sayaka Kanda (Japanese); Hilary Haag (English)
Ezomichi is the name of a magical girl character in Hikari's favorite anime show. She would often talk to Hikari in his imagination whenever he is seeking questions concerning him and Iroha. Ezomichi has a larger role in the anime series.

== Media ==
=== Manga ===
The manga series was serialized in Kodansha's Dessert between July 2011 and May 2016, with the series later being compiled into twelve tankōbon volumes released between December 2011 and August 2016. Kodansha later republished the series with new cover designs from August 2017 to November 2017. Kodansha Comics announced on May 16, 2017, that they would publish the manga digitally in English, with the first volume being released on May 30, 2017, and the final volume being released on January 30, 2018.

==== Volumes ====
English release dates and ISBNs are for the digital version. Chapters are numbered as episodes, for example: episode・19

| No. | Original release date | Original ISBN | English release date | English ISBN |
|---|---|---|---|---|
| 1 | December 13, 2011 | 978-4-06-365675-6 | May 30, 2017 | 9781682336199 |
1. "The story of how I first met her" (オレがあいつと出会ってしまった件について。, Ore ga aitsu to deatte shimatta kudan ni tsuite.); 2. "The story of my first kiss" (オレがキスした件について。, Ore ga kisu shita kudan ni tsuite.); 3. "The story of how I almost lost my virginity" (オレの貞操がピンチになった件について。, Ore no teisō ga pinchi ni natta kudan ni tsuite.); 4. "The story of the sorceress and me" (オレと魔法使いの件について。, Ore to mahōtsukai no kudan ni tsuite.)
| 2 | May 11, 2012 | 978-4-06-365692-3 | August 22, 2017 | 9781682336779 |
5. "The story of how I searched for the lost part of me" (失われたオレを求める件について。, Ushinawareta ore o motomeru kudan ni tsuite.); 6. "The story of what I assumed real life would be" (オレが想定するリア充の件について。, Ore ga sōtei suru riajū no kudan ni tsuite.); 7. "The story of my certain ruin" (オレの消失フラグの件について。, Ore no shōshitsu furagu no kudan ni tsuite.); 8. "The story of my dark days" (オレの暗黒期の件について。, Ore no ankoku-ki no kudan ni tsuite.)
| 3 | September 13, 2012 | 978-4-06-365705-0 | September 26, 2017 | 9781682336786 |
9. "The story about my friendship with another guy" (オレと男の友情の件について。, Ore to otoko no yūjō no kudan ni tsuite.); 10. "The story about my summer memories" (オレと夏の思い出の件について。, Ore to natsunoomoide no kudan ni tsuite.); 11. "The story about how I apologized" (オレの謝り方の件について。, Ore no ayamari-kata no kudan ni tsuite.); "Special Chapter. Spring fever" (SP番外編 spring fever, SP Bangai-hen spring fever)
| 4 | February 13, 2013 | 978-4-06-365720-3 | October 10, 2017 | 9781682338162 |
12. "The story about me and two girls" (オレと二人の女子の件について。, Ore to futari no joshi no kudan ni tsuite.); 13. "The story about me and a certain misunderstanding" (オレとある誤解の件について。, Ore to aru gokai no kudan ni tsuite.); 14. "The story about me and camping" (オレとキャンプの件について。, Ore to kyanpu no kudan no tsuite.); 15. "The story about my overly complicated relationships" (オレには複雑すぎる関係性の件について。, Ore ni wa fukuzatsu sugiru kankei-sei no kudan ni tsuite.)
| 5 | July 12, 2013 | 978-4-06-365736-4 | October 24, 2017 | 9781682338179 |
16. "The story about how we crossed paths" (オレたちのすれ違いの件について。, Ore-tachi no surechigai no kudan ni tsuite.); 17. "The story about the confession" (オレが告白された件について。, Ore ga kokuhaku sa reta kudan ni tsuite.); 18. "The story about my life's greatest strategy" (オレ史上最大の作戦の件について。, Ore shijōsaidainosakusen no kudan ni tsuite.); 19. "The story about my happiness" (オレの幸せの件について。, Ore no shiawase no kudan ni tsuite.)
| 6 | December 13, 2013 | 978-4-06-365751-7 | November 7, 2017 | 9781682339138 |
20. "The story of the mysterious good-looking guy" (オレと謎のイケメンの件について。, Ore to nazo no ikemen no kudan ni tsuite.); 21. "The story of the form my love takes" (オレと恋のかたちの件について。, Ore to koi no katachi no kudan ni tsuite.); 22. "The story of my best friend's love" (オレが気になる親友の恋の件について。, Ore ga ki ni naru shin'yū no koi no kudan ni tsuite.); 23. "The story of what I told my best friend" (オレが親友にかける言葉の件について。, Ore ga shin'yū ni kakeru kotoba no kudan ni tsuite.); Special ver.: "The story about Ishino-san's date" (石野さんのデートの件について。, Ishino-san no dēto no kudan ni tsuite.)
| 7 | May 13, 2014 | 978-4-06-365769-2 | November 21, 2017 | 9781682339145 |
24. "The story about the end of my best friend's love" (親友の恋の結末の件について。, Shin'yū no koi no ketsumatsu no kudan ni tsuite.); 25. "The story of my Cultural Festival suffering" (文化祭にまつわる苦悩の件について。, Bunkamatsuri ni matsuwaru kunō no kudan ni tsuite.); 26. "The story about my important role at the Cultural Festival" (文化祭における重要な役割の件について。, Bunkamatsuri ni okeru jūyōna yakuwari no kudan ni tsuite.); 27. "The story about my judgement at the beauty contest" (オレがミスコンで評価するポイントの件について。, Ore ga misukon de hyōka suru pointo no kudan ni tsuite.)
| 8 | October 10, 2014 | 978-4-06-365787-6 | December 5, 2017 | 9781682339152 |
28. "The story about the unforeseen incident with my family" (オレの家族にまつわる予想外の件について。, Ore no kazoku ni matsuwaru yosō-gai no kudan ni tsuite.); 29. "The story of how I saved my family from crisis" (オレが家族の危機を救う件について。, Ore ga kazoku no kiki o sukuu kudan ni tsuite.); 30. "The story of the similarities between my dad and me" (オレと父親の相似性の件について。, Ore to chichioya no sōjisei no kudan ni tsuite.); 31. "The story of my parents' secret romance" (オレの両親の恋愛秘話の件について。, Ore no ryōshin no ren'ai hiwa no kudan ni tsuite.)
| 9 | March 13, 2015 | 978-4-06-365807-1 | December 19, 2017 | 9781682339169 |
32. "The story of how my best friend finally conquered love" (オレの親友が打ち破った恋の壁の件について。, Ore no shin'yū ga uchiyabutta koi no kabe no kudan ni tsuite.); 33. "The story of my female friend Ishino-san's love" (オレの女友達・石野さんの恋の件について。, Ore no on'na tomodachi Ishino-san no koi no kudan ni tsuite.); 34. "The story of Ayado-san's romance troubles" (綾戸さんの恋にまつわる新たなる悩みの件について。, Ayado-san no koi ni matsuwaru aratanaru nayami no kudan ni tsuite.); 35. "The story of a worry that my friend couldn't share with me" (オレに相談できない親友の悩みの件について。, Ore ni sōdan dekinai shin'yū no nayami no kudan ni tsuite.)
| 10 | September 11, 2015 | 978-4-06-365830-9 | January 2, 2018 | 9781682339176 |
36. "The story of my girlfriend's invitation" (オレを悩ませる彼女からのお誘いの件について。, Ore o nayama seru kanojo kara no osasoi no kudan ni tsuite.); 37. "The issue I needed to overcome for my trip" (旅立ちに際してオレがクリアーするべき案件について。, Tabidachi ni saishite ore ga kuriā surubeki anken ni tsuite.); 38. "The story of the promise I made with my girlfriend's brother" (オレが彼女の弟と約束した件について。, Ore ga kanojo no otōto to yakusoku shita kudan ni tsuite.); 39. "The story about my hidden thoughts" (オレの秘めたる想いの件について。, Ore no himetaru omoi no kudan ni tsuite.)
| 11 | February 12, 2016 | 978-4-06-365853-8 | January 16, 2018 | 9781642120400 |
40. "The story of when I took a long look at my future" (オレの将来を見据える件について。, Ore no shōrai o misueru kudan ni tsuite.); 41. "The story about the choice I made in high school that I don't regret" (オレの高校生活の悔いなき選択の件について。, Ore no kōkō seikatsu no kui naki sentaku no kudan ni tsuite.); 42. "The story of when I contemplated the meaning of life" (オレが生命の神秘を考える件について。, Ore ga seimei no shinpi o kangaeru kudan ni tsuite.); 43. "The story about my past and my future" (オレの過去と未来の件について。, Ore no kako to mirai no kudan ni tsuite.)
| 12 | August 12, 2016 | 978-4-06-365874-3 | January 30, 2018 | 9781642120417 |
44. "The story about the promise we made" (オレとあいつの約束の件について。, Ore to aitsu no yakusoku no kudan ni tsuite.); 45. "The story about what I said to my old self" (オレが過去の自分と語りたい件について。, Ore ga kako no jibun to kataritai kudan ni tsuite.); 46. "The story about how I cried as an adult" (オレが大人になっても涙を流した件について。, Ore ga otona ni natte mo namida o nagashita kudan ni tsuite.); 47. "The story about our happily ever after" (オレとあいつの幸せな未来の件について。, Ore to aitsu no shiawasena mirai no kudan ni tsuite.)

=== Anime ===
An anime television series adaptation was announced in November 2017. The series is directed by Takashi Naoya and written by Deko Akao, with animation by Hoods Entertainment and character designs by Satomi Kurita. It aired from April 4 to June 20, 2018, on Nippon TV's AnichU programming block. The series ran for 12 episodes. The first season was released on Blu-ray/DVD in four compilations, each containing one disc with three episodes, by VAP between June 27 and September 26, 2018. On June 19, 2018, the anime official website tweeted plans for a second anime season that aired from January 8 to March 26, 2019. The cast and staff reprised their roles. The second season ran for 12 episodes.

In March 2018, Sentai Filmworks licensed the anime for an English-language release and simulcasted it on Hidive for the United States, Canada, Australia, New Zealand, the United Kingdom, Ireland, South Africa, the Netherlands, the Nordics, Spain, Portugal, and Latin America. In July 2018, Sentai Filmworks announced plans to record an English-language dub for the series. The dub began streaming on October 30, 2018.

Two pieces of theme music are used. The opening theme is "Daiji na Koto" (だいじなこと, Important Thing) by Quruli and the ending theme is "HiDE the BLUE" by BiSH. The opening theme for the second season is "Futari nara" (二人なら) by BiSH and the ending theme for the second season is "Hagan" (破顔) by Fujifabric.

==== Episodes ====
===== Season 1 =====
| No. overall | No. in season | Title (Note: All English titles are taken from Hidive.) | Directed by | Written by | Original release date |
|---|---|---|---|---|---|
| 1 | 1 | "About the Time I First Met Her."; Transliteration: "Ore ga aitsu to deatte shimatta ken nitsuite." (Japanese: オレがあいつと出会ってしまった件について。) | Takashi Naoya | Deko Akao | April 4, 2018 |
Teenager Hikari Tsutsui is an unpopular otaku, with his only friend being the oddball and likewise otaku Yūto Itō. As punishment for being late, Hikari has to clean the school pool and meets Iroha Igarashi, a girl famous for her lousy behavior and lack of friends. Although he initially detests Iroha with a passion and is determined to avoid her at all costs, he cannot help but take notice of her, especially after she stands up for him against his classmates who mock him. Despite watching her two-time a pair of guys and embarrass him by asking him out in public, Hikari decides to be her friend and stands up for her as well. The next day, Hikari has caught a cold from Iroha accidentally dragging him into the pool during their punishment together, but insists on coming to school anyway, arriving late. Iroha is late too, but this time on purpose to see him, whereupon she kisses Hikari and offers to clean the school pool alone.
| 2 | 2 | "About the Time My Chastity was in a Predicament."; Transliteration: "Ore no teisō ga pinchi ni natta ken nitsuite." (Japanese: オレの貞操がピンチになった件について。) | Matsuo Asami | Deko Akao | April 11, 2018 |
| 3 | 3 | "About the Time Normies Made Me Even Worse."; Transliteration: "Ore to riajū ga iroiro kojiraseta ken nitsuite." (Japanese: オレとリア充が色々こじらせた件について。) | Hazuki Mizumoto | Hiroko Fukuda | April 18, 2018 |
| 4 | 4 | "About My Dark Times."; Transliteration: "Ore no ankoku-ki no ken nitsuite." (Japanese: オレの暗黒期の件について。) | Ysohitaka Fujimoto | Yoriko Tomita | April 25, 2018 |
| 5 | 5 | "About When I Tried to Make Summer Memories."; Transliteration: "Ore ga natsu no omoide wo tsukurou to shita ken nitsuite." (Japanese: オレが夏の思い出を作ろうとした件について。) | Matsuo Asami | Yoriko Tomita | May 2, 2018 |
| 6 | 6 | "About the way I apologize." Transliteration: "Ore no ayamari-kata no ken nitsuite." (Japanese: オレの謝り方の件について。) | Sumito Sasaki | Deko Akao | May 9, 2018 |
| 7 | 7 | "About the Two Girls and Me."; Transliteration: "Ore to futari no joshi no ken nitsuite." (Japanese: オレと二人の女子の件について。) | Matsuo Asami | Hiroko Fukuda | May 16, 2018 |
| 8 | 8 | "About How Camping Was a High-level Event for Me."; Transliteration: "Ore ni wa kyanpu ga haireberuibentodatta ken nitsuite." (Japanese: オレにはキャンプがハイレベルイベントだった件について。) | Yoshitaka Kōno | Yoriko Tomita | May 23, 2018 |
| 9 | 9 | "About Our Mutual Understanding."; Transliteration: "Ore-tachi no surechigai no ken nitsuite." (Japanese: オレたちのすれ違いの件について。) | Matsuo Asami | Hiroko Fukuda | May 30, 2018 |
| 10 | 10 | "About My Confession."; Transliteration: "Ore no kokuhaku no ken nitsuite." (Japanese: オレの告白の件について。) | Matsuo Asami | Deko Akao | June 6, 2018 |
| 11 | 11 | "About the Love of a Best Friend That I Worry About."; Transliteration: "Ore ga ki ni naru shinyū no koi no ken nitsuite." (Japanese: オレが気になる親友の恋の件について。) | Sumito Sasaki | Deko Akao | June 13, 2018 |
| 12 | 12 | "About the Shape of Our Love."; Transliteration: "Ore to aitsu no koi no katachi no ken nitsuite." (Japanese: オレとあいつの恋のかたちの件について。) | Matsuo Asami | Deko Akao | June 20, 2018 |

===== Season 2 =====
| No. overall | No. in season | Title | Directed by | Written by | Original release date |
|---|---|---|---|---|---|
| 13 | 1 | "Regarding the Time We Put One Foot in the Normie World."; Transliteration: "Ore-tachi ga riajū ni kataashi tsukkomi tsutsu aru ken nitsuite." (Japanese: オレたちがリア充に片足つっこみつつある件について。) | Matsuo Asami | Deko Akao | January 8, 2019 |
| 14 | 2 | "Regarding the Time We Had Important Roles in the School Festival."; Transliteration: "Bunka-sai ni okeru jūyō na yakuwari no ken nitsuite." (Japanese: 文化祭における重要な役割の件について。) | Matsuo Asami | Yoriko Tomita | January 15, 2019 |
| 15 | 3 | "Regarding My Unforeseen Family Crisis."; Transliteration: "Ore no kazoku ni matsuwaru yosō-gai na kiki no ken tsuite." (Japanese: オレの家族にまつわる予想外な危機の件ついて。) | Sumito Sasaki | Hiroko Fukuda | January 22, 2019 |
| 16 | 4 | "Regarding the Untold Story of My Parents' Courtship."; Transliteration: "Ore no ryōshin no ren'ai hiwa no ken nitsuite." (Japanese: オレの両親の恋愛秘話の件について。) | Matsuo Asami | Hiroko Fukuda | January 29, 2019 |
| 17 | 5 | "Regarding Miss Ayado's New Mental Anguish."; Transliteration: "Ayado-san no arata naru nayami no ken nitsuite." (Japanese: 綾戸さんの新たなる悩みの件について。) | Nao Miyoshi | Yoriko Tomita | February 5, 2019 |
| 18 | 6 | "Regarding the Courtship of My Female Friend Ishino."; Transliteration: "Ore no onna tomodachi. Ishino-san no koi no ken nitsuite." (Japanese: オレの女友達・石野さんの恋の件について。) | Matsuo Asami | Deko Akao | February 12, 2019 |
| 19 | 7 | "Regarding the Troubling Invitation from My Girlfriend."; Transliteration: "Ore o nayamaseru kanojo kara no osasoi no ken nitsuite." (Japanese: オレを悩ませる彼女からのお誘いの件について。) | Matsuo Asami | Hiroko Fukuda | February 19, 2019 |
| 20 | 8 | "Regarding When my Friend and my Maybe Friend Became Official."; Transliteration: "Ore no tomodachi ka mo shirenai yatsu ga kuttsuita ken nitsuite." (Japanese: オレの友だちかもしれない奴がくっついた件について。) | Matsuo Asami | Yoriko Tomita | February 26, 2019 |
| 21 | 9 | "Regarding My Choice to Have No Regrets in My High School Life."; Transliteration: "Ore no kōkō seikatsu no kui naki sentaku no ken nitsuite." (Japanese: オレの高校生活の悔いなき選択の件について。) | Chiko Ueda | Hiroko Fukuda | March 5, 2019 |
| 22 | 10 | "Regarding My Thoughts on the Sacred Mysteries of Life."; Transliteration: "Ore ga seimei no shinpi okangaeru ken nitsuite." (Japanese: オレが生命の神秘を考える件について。) | Sumito Sasaki | Deko Akao | March 12, 2019 |
| 23 | 11 | "Regarding My Last Promise to Her."; Transliteration: "Ore to aitsu no saigo no yakusoku no ken nitsuite." (Japanese: オレとあいつの最後の約束の件について。) | Nao Miyoshi | Deko Akao | March 19, 2019 |
| 24 | 12 | "Regarding Her Future and Mine."; Transliteration: "Ore to aitsu no mirai no ken nitsuite." (Japanese: オレとあいつの未来の件について。) | Matsuo Asami | Deko Akao | March 26, 2019 |

=== Live-action film ===
A live-action film adaptation directed by Tsutomu Hanabusa and distributed by Warner Bros. was released in Japanese theaters on September 14, 2018.

== Reception ==
In reviewing the anime's first season, Paul Jensen of Anime News Network criticized the animation quality for the first three episodes as "mediocre". However, he praised the storyline and characterizations between Iroha and Hikari. For the final episode, Jensen said that Iroha and Hikari's chemistry was the episode's "saving grace". Although he felt that the season overall "wasted far too much time trying to spice up the drama", Jensen said that it "wasn't terrible, but it never made the most of its strengths".
