= Playgirl (TV series) =

- プレイガール
- Genre: Action-drama
- Created by: Hirokazu Takemoto
- Directed by: Ryuichi Takamori; Nobuo Nakagawa; Mio Ezaki; Shigehiro Ozawa, etc
- Starring: Michie Azuma; Mimi Fukada; Yuriko Hishimi; Yayoi Watanabe; Eiko Yanami; Yumiko Katayama; Yukiko Kuwahara; Reiko Oshida
- Music by: Takeo Yamashita
- Country of origin: Japan
- No. of episodes: 287

Production
- Production company: Toei Company

Original release
- Network: TV Tokyo (Tokyo Channel 12)
- Release: 1969 – 1976

Playgirl (プレイガール, Pureigāru) is a Japanese television action/drama series. Running from 1969 to 1976 over a total of 358 episodes, it was conceived in the spy fiction genre.

Playgirl Q (プレイガールQ, Pureigāru Kyū) is the sequel to the series that aired the same as Playgirl Masterpiece Series (プレイガール傑作シリーズ, Pureigāru Kessaku Shirīzu), which aired in 1975 before hiatus. The show adapted over television specials, including Playgirl '92: Storm Calling at High-Leg Corps or The Black Pearl Murder Case (プレイガール'92 嵐を呼ぶハイレグ軍団~黒真珠殺人事件~, Arashi wo Yobu Hairegu Gundan Kuroshinju Satsujin Jiken) and (プレイガール2012 連鎖誘拐殺人を暴け!熱くてエロくてヤバい女豹たち)

== Cast ==
- Tamaki Sawa: Sawamura Tamaki
- Bunjaku Han: Yumin Darowa
- Mako Midori: Ichijo Mako
- Reiko Oshida: Ota Reiko
- Masako Togawa: Amato Masako
- Yayoi Watanabe: Tanabe Yayoi
- Junko Miyazono: Miyano Junko
- Eiko Yanami: Mie Eiko (1973–74)
- Yuriko Hishimi: Hishida Yuriko (1973–74)
