= Jealousy Game =

- Blu-ray cover
- Directed by: Yōichi Higashi
- Screenplay by: Akiko Tanaka
- Produced by: Katsuhiro Maeda
- Starring: Reiko Oshida; Yosuke Natsuki; Hiroaki Murakami; Hitomi Takahashi; Shinsho Nakamaru
- Cinematography: Koichi Kawakami
- Edited by: Keiko Ichihara
- Music by: Ichiro Araki
- Production company: Gentosha
- Distributed by: Nikkatsu
- Release date: August 6, 1982 (Japan)
- Running time: 84 minutes
- Country: Japan
- Language: Japanese

Jealousy Game (Japanese: ジェラシー・ゲーム, Hepburn: Jerashi Geimu) is a 1982 Japanese Roman Porno road movie directed by Yōichi Higashi, with a screenplay by Akiko Tanaka. It tells the story of two couples, one in their thirties and the other in their twenties, who switch partners for trivial reasons. The film was shot on 35 mm, and stars Reiko Oshida in the lead role, in addition to Yosuke Natsuki, Hiroaki Murakami, Hitomi Takahashi and Shinsho Nakamaru. Ichiro Araki composed the film's score, while its self-titled theme song was performed by Kaoru Ōtake. Jealousy Game was theatrically released by Nikkatsu on August 6, 1982, in Japan.

== Plot ==
Set in Hokkaido, the film depicts a couple in their thirties and another couple in their twenties who replace their respective partners for trivial reasons.

Shinichi and his wife Haruko, bored with life, close their coffee shop and wander around Hokkaido on a motorcycle, en route to a hotel in Sapporo. Meanwhile, a young couple, Eiji and Yoko, are also traveling around Hokkaido without telling their parents. They pass each other on the road.

As Shinichi and Haruko rest near a riverbank, Shinichi forgets that Haruko made coffee and drinks it himself, which offends her. They get into a fight, after which Shinichi leaves. Haruko, angry at her husband, goes back to her house. After running for a while, Shinichi finds Yoko collapsed and lying on the road. He picks her up and rides off. Yoko tells him that she was abandoned by Eiji.

Meanwhile, Eiji stumbles upon Haruko's house. He seduces her, and the two go to a drive-in for dinner. However, Shinichi and Yoko are also there, creating an awkward atmosphere for both of them. That night, the two couples engage in sex with each other's partners. Shinichi and Yoko are satisfied, but Haruko and Eiji are frustrated by their lack of sexual chemistry.

The next day, the two groups continue to run, hating each other. After a while, Haruko hears on the radio that a couple has died in an accident. Thinking it is Shinichi and Yoko, she rushes with Eiji to the nearest hospital. They run into Shinichi and Yoko, who heard the same radio announcement and harbored the same fears. Haruko is relieved that they were not the two who died.

Shinichi, wanting to rekindle his relationship with his wife, heads to the hotel in Sapporo as originally planned. While waiting for Haruko in his room, Yoko arrives. At that moment, news breaks that Haruko and Eiji have died in an accident. Yoko smiles, thinking that she can now be with Shinichi forever, but Shinichi, who is in shock, departs the hotel, leaving Yoko behind.

== Cast ==
- Reiko Oshida as Haruko Suruga
- Yosuke Natsuki as Shinichi Suruga
- Hiroaki Murakami as Eiji Haga
- Hitomi Takahashi as Yoko
- Shinsho Nakamaru as Police Officer
- Kenji Shiiya as Master
- Hirokazu Inoue as Father
- Kaoru Ōtake as Singer

== Release ==
Jealousy Game was theatrically released by Nikkatsu on August 6, 1982, in Japan. It was shown as a double feature with Masaru Konuma's Lady Karuizawa. The film was later released to Blu-ray on October 2, 2018, by Happinet.
