= Be My Guest, Be My Baby =

- Directed by: Mitsuhito Shiraha
- Written by: Satoshi Okochi
- Based on: The Sociology of Filipino Pub Women by Kosho Nakashima
- Produced by: Kazuo Mitani
- Starring: Koki Maeda; Razel Ichimiya; Stefanie Arianne; Misato Tanaka; Kanji Tsuda; Shuna Iijima; Takashi Nishina; Alisa Urahama; Yoshimasa Kondo; Hiroshi Katsuno
- Cinematography: Ritsuko Toyoura
- Edited by: Dong Jing
- Music by: Shohei Narabe
- Release date: 17 February 2024
- Running time: 114 minutes
- Country: Japan
- Languages: Japanese; Tagalog; English

Be My Guest, Be My Baby (Japanese: フィリピンパブ嬢の社会学) is a 2024 Japanese romantic comedy film directed by Mitsuhito Shiraha, starring Koki Maeda and Razel Ichimiya. An adaptation of the Kosho Nakashima book The Sociology of Filipino Pub Women, it follows a graduate student doing research on female foreign workers in Japan as he falls in love with a Filipino pub hostess.

== Cast ==
- Koki Maeda as Shota Nakajima
- Razel Ichimiya as Mika
- Stefanie Arianne as Aki
- Misato Tanaka as Kaoru Ikeuchi
- Kanji Tsuda as Chairman
- Shuna Iijima as Ri
- Takashi Nishina as Masayoshi Kokubo
- Alisa Urahama as Mariposa Manager
- Yoshimasa Kondo as Shibata
- Hiroshi Katsuno as Inspector Kashiwara
- Motoki Fujiwara as Police Officer
- Alisa Urahama as Chihiro Nakajima
- Arrian Labios as Mika's father
- Geraldine Aleria as Mika's mother
- Kyla Galang as Mika's sister
- Adela Talampas as Mika's grandmother
- Jose Talampas as Mika's grandfather
- Uchiyama Lerma as Maria
- Ramos Marjorie as Janet
- Raine Dione as Mizuki
- Mark Anthony Viray as Sandy
- Haruna Kishimoto as Ayaka
- Emani Stanford as Kanako

== Production ==
On reading the non-fiction book The Sociology of Filipino Pub Women by Kosho Nakashima in 2018, filmmaker Mitsuhito Shiraha travelled to Nagoya to meet with Nakashima, hoping to adapt the book into a film. In writing the script, he aimed to adhere to the contents of the book largely. In August 2022, it was publicly announced that Shiraha was to direct a film adaptation of the book, starring Koki Maeda and Razel Ichimiya. This was Maeda's first leading role in over a decade and Ichimiya's film debut. Principal photography took place from 30 August to mid-September and was supported by the Kasugai Film Production Executive Committee. The film was primarily shot on location in the city of Kasugai in Aichi Prefecture, where the film is set. Other shooting locations included the Philippines and Nagoya. In March 2023, it was announced that Stefanie Arianne, Misato Tanaka, Kanji Tsuda, Shuna Iijima, Takashi Nishina, Alisa Urahama, Yoshimasa Kondo and Hiroshi Katsuno would also be appearing in the film.

== Release ==
The film was initially scheduled for a nationwide theatrical release in 2023. It opened at the Midland Square Cinema, the Nakagawa Korona Cinema World and the Midland Cinema Nagoya Airport, all in Nagoya, on 10 November. There it became a "smash hit", attracting over 5,000 viewers in three weeks. The film was released with English-language subtitles, which reportedly "attracted many Filipinos living in Japan." By the end of November, the film continued to perform well at the Midland Cinema Nagoya Airport with "no drop" in attendance numbers in the weeks since its release. This secured a wider release for the film, which opened in theatres across the country on 17 February 2024. By June 2024, the film had attracted over 9,000 viewers and the number of theatres showing the film was reportedly still growing.

== Reception ==
Film critic Kiichiro Yanashita praised Ichimiya's "charming" performance, considering it a highlight of the film, which he felt was a "typical" romance film.

== Stage adaptation ==
The film was adapted into a stage play titled Mahal ko Medley. Written and directed by An Arita, it starred Arianne in her first leading role on stage. It was first performed at the Sasashima Studio in Nagoya in November 2024. Unlike the film, the play does not strictly adhere to the events of the film and is instead told from the perspective of Mika. It details her life in Japan over several decades, beginning with her arrival in the late 1980s.
