= Osaka Tough Guys =

- Directed by: Takashi Miike
- Written by: Dokuman (comic book); Tetsuo Inoue (screenplay)
- Produced by: Fujio Matsushima
- Starring: Sei Hiraizumi; Gajiro Satoh
- Cinematography: Seihō Maruyama
- Release date: June 21, 1995
- Running time: 101 minutes
- Country: Japan
- Language: Japanese

Osaka Tough Guys (なにわ遊侠伝, Naniwa Yūkyōden) is a 1995 action comedy film directed by Takashi Miike. The story is about two high school boys who happen to get involved with the yakuza.

== Plot ==
After saving a girl named Keiko from being attacked by a gang, Makoto Fukunaga and Eiji Yamada are expelled from Tsutenkaku High for fighting. Before they leave, they blackmail the administration into giving them one million yen as a parting gift by threatening to expose their secrets and ruin the reputation of the school. That night they follow the boss of the Kinsu sect, into an expensive hostess club and end up spending it all. The next day they respond to a job listing from the front company Takaranoyama Trading Ltd. offering 500,000 yen per month to young men with no experience and are forcibly conscripted into the Kinsu sect through contracts signed in blood, along with Tokichi Kinoshita, a student studying animal husbandry at Yamanosato University who ends up never being invited to participate in the activities of the other yakuza.

Head Captain Kaizo Daimon attempts to help Makoto and Eiji obtain money through collision insurance fraud but they end up in a collision with a police car. Sabu ends up pawning his gold-plated Kinsu sect badge as well as those of Makoto and Eiji to pay off the debt incurred from their failed used panties business.

At a hostess bar, Makoto encounters Keiko as she is leaving work and walks her home as she tells him about a film she will be starring in. Daimon and the boss of the Asashi sect get into a karaoke competition over a hostess named Akemi, then Daimon sees an ad to star in a pornographic film. Sabu informs Makoto that the production company, 7 Star Productions, is just a front company for the Asashi sect that produces porn. Makoto and Eiji race to the film set, where Daimon is realizing that the actress is not there willingly, and together they beat up the Asashi sect members and rescue Keiko.

Hosoda of the Asashi sect calls Amachi and demands a finger from Makoto and a finger from Eiji as well as monetary compensation as an apology but Daimon asks to be allowed to settle the dispute and the big boss allows it. Daimon, Makoto, and Eiji confront the Asashi and Daimon threatens the Asashi boss with fake dynamite he obtained from Kinoshita until they withdraw the demand for the finger and compensation. The dynamite ends up being real and explodes, yet Daimon, Makoto, and Eiji are so tough that they survive intact.

== Cast ==
- Sei Hiraizumi
- Kentarō Nakakura as Eiji Yamada
- Hachirō Oka
- Yoshiyuki Omori as Makoto Fukunaga
- Gajiro Satoh as Sabu
- Tadashi Satō
- Shingo Yamashiro as Kinsu Clan Boss
- Rikiya Yasuoka as Daimon
- Tetsuya Yuuki
