= Sayaka Kanda =

Japanese actress (1986–2021)

- 神田 沙也加
- Sayaka Kanda in April 2021
- Born: October 1, 1986; Chiyoda, Tokyo, Japan
- Died: December 18, 2021 (aged 35); Sapporo, Hokkaido, Japan
- Other names: Sayaka; Lily; Jun Uehara (上原純)
- Occupations: Actress; voice actress; singer; model
- Years active: 1999–2021
- Spouse: Mitsu Murata (m. 2017; div. 2019)
- Parents: Masaki Kanda (father); Seiko Matsuda (mother)
- Musical career
- Genre: J-pop
- Instrument: Vocals
- Formerly of: Trustrick; Alices
- Website: www.sayaka-kanda.net

Sayaka Kanda (Japanese: 神田 沙也加, Hepburn: Kanda Sayaka; October 1, 1986 – December 18, 2021), also known professionally as Sayaka, Lily, and Jun Uehara (上原純, Uehara Jun), was a Japanese actress, singer, and model. She was the only child of actor Masaki Kanda and pop singer Seiko Matsuda.

== Early life ==
Kanda was born at Tokyo Teishin Hospital in Chiyoda, Tokyo. She was the only child of actor Masaki Kanda and Seiko Matsuda, a representative idol singer of the 1980s in Japan. Her paternal grandmother Teruko Asahi (1924–2001) was a former actress.

== Career ==
In 1999, while a student at a Japanese school in Los Angeles, she appeared in Bean Cake, a short film that won the Palme d'Or du court métrage at the 2001 Cannes Film Festival. She was quite active as an actress in movies and mostly on stage since her debut.

In 2006, Kanda composed and wrote the lyrics to "Bless You", a song performed by her mother Seiko Matsuda. Kanda was credited under the name "Jun Uehara", originating from two characters from the manga series Good Morning Call, which she had loved at the time.

Kanda made her Kōhaku Uta Gassen debut in December 2011 singing "Ue o Muite Arukō" alongside her mother, Seiko Matsuda.

In July 2012, Kanda debuted as a voice actress on TV animation Good Luck Girl!, which led her to be cast as Mary in The Muppets and Anna in the Japanese language dub of Disney's animated film Frozen. She won the Best Lead Actress award for the role in the 9th Seiyu Awards. In 2019, she voiced as Anna once again for Kingdom Hearts III.

In April 2014, she formed the duo Trustrick with guitarist Billy. They released their debut album, Eternity, on June 25 of the same year. They disbanded on December 17, 2016.

Kanda appeared as a special guest in the Alan Symphony Concert from December 20, 2014, alongside Tibetan Chinese diva Alan Dawa Dolma, and together, they sang a music piece originally performed by Alan titled "Kaze no Tegami" (風の手紙, "Letter in the Wind").

She voiced the character, Kaede Akamatsu, in the 2017 visual novel video game, Danganronpa V3: Killing Harmony.

Kanda released covers of Vocaloid songs on her YouTube channel.

=== Modeling career ===
While Kanda was on hiatus from her acting career in 2005, she began appearing in lolita fashion magazines under the name Lily, a stage name that she had chosen from a "dreamy worldview." Kanda modeled for Kera, Gothic & Lolita Bible, Eternita, and Angelic Pretty's catalogs. In 2012, she collaborated with Angelic Pretty to release the Melt ChocoLapin dress set.

== Personal life ==
In May 2017, Kanda married actor Mitsu Murata. Kanda announced their divorce in December 2019. Kanda was in a relationship with actor Takahisa Maeyama after co-starring in the stage adaptation of Crest of the Royal Family in August 2021. The two dated with the intention of marriage due to their age. In 2024, Maeyama stated that they only dated for two months and had ended their relationship by the time they had starred together in the Japanese production of My Fair Lady in November 2021.

== Death ==
On December 18, 2021, Kanda was found unconscious in the outer garden on the fourteenth floor of a hotel in Chūō ward, Sapporo. She later died at a hospital at the age of 35. The cause of death was determined to be traumatic shock by the Sapporo Central Police Station, which also said that she had fallen from her room in the upper floors of the hotel. Kanda's remains were cremated and her family kept her ashes at home. A report from Shūkan Bunshun claimed she committed suicide following vocal cord issues as well as issues with her relationship with Maeyama.

== Discography ==
=== Singles ===
- "Ever Since" (2002)
- "Garden" (2003)
- "Mizu Iro" (2004)
- "Jōgen no Tsuki" (2005)

with TRUSTRICK

- "World's End Curtain Call -theme of DANGANRONPA THE STAGE-" (2014)
- "FLYING FAFNIR" (2015)
- "innocent promise" (2015)
- "Recall THE END" (2016)
- "DEAD OR LIE" (2016) duo with Maon Kurosaki
- "Rainbow Summer" (2019), the theme song of Atelier Ryza: Ever Darkness & the Secret Hideout

=== Digital Singles ===
- "LUVORATORRRRRY!" (2018)
- "Good Morning, Polar Night" (2019)
- "Roki" (2019)

with TRUSTRICK

- "On your marks!" (2014)

as Yuna from "Sword Art Online"

- "Ubiquitous dB" (2017)
- "delete" (2017)
- "Break Beat Bark!" (2017)
- "longing" (2017)
- "smile for you" (2017)

=== Albums ===
- Doll (2005)
- Liberty (2011)

with TRUSTRICK

- Eternity (2014)
- TRUST (2015)
- TRICK (2016)

=== Extended plays ===
with TRUSTRICK

- Mirai-kei Answer E.P. (2015)
- beloved E.P. (2016)

=== Cover Albums ===
- MUSICALOID #38 (2018)
- MUSICALOID #38 Act.2 (2019)
- MUSICALOID #38 Act.3 (2021)

=== Compilation Albums ===
as Yuna from Sword Art Online

- Sword Art Online the Movie : Ordinal Scale (Original Motion Picture Soundtrack) (2017)

== Filmography ==
=== Film ===
- Bean Cake (1999)
- Dragon Head (2003) – Ako Seto
- School Wars: Hero (2004) – Mitiyo Wada
- Imadoki Japanese yo (2008) – Kyouko
- Farewell, Kamen Rider Den-O: Final Countdown (2008) – Sora
- Amazing Grace (2011) – Shizuku Asamizu
- Geki×Cine Bara to Samurai (2011) – Pony de Bribon
- Real Girl (2018) – Ezomichi (voice)

=== Television drama ===
- Yankee Bokō ni Kaeru / Drop-out Teacher Returns to School (TBS, 2003) – Nanae Koga
- 四分の一の絆 (TBS, 2004) – Maiko Nisio
- Mito Kōmon (TBS, 2004, 2007) – Kozue, Osaki
- たった一度の雪 〜SAPPORO・1972年〜 (HBC, 2007) – Chiho Shimomura
- Omotesando Koukou Gasshoubu! (TBS, 2015) – Emiri Seyama

=== Theater Performances ===
- Into the Woods (2004) – Little Red Ridinghood (credited as SAYAKA)
- Murasaki Shikibu Story (2006, 2008) – Empress Shōshi
- The Woman in White (2007) – Laura Fairlie
- A Midsummer Night's Dream (2007–2009) – Peaseblossom
- A Midsummer Night's Dream (2008) – Hermia
- Love Letters (2008–2010) – Melissa
- Grease (2008) – Sandy Dumbrowski
- She Loves Me (2009–2010) – Amalia Balash
- Bara to Samurai〜Goemon Rock OverDrive (2010) – Pony de Bribon
- Les Misérables (2009–2011) – Cosette
- Peter Pan (2009–2011, 2017) – Wendy Darling
- The Fantasticks (2010) – Luisa
- Endless SHOCK (2012) – Rika
- Anne of Green Gables (2012) – Anne Shirley
- Himeyuri (2012–2014) – Kimi
- Dance of the Vampires (2015–2020) – Sarah
- Danganronpa The Stage (2014–2016) – Mukuro Ikusaba and Junko Enoshima
- Super Danganronpa 2 The Stage (2015–2017) – Junko Enoshima
- 1789: Les Amants de la Bastille (2016–2018) – Olympe
- Legally Blonde (2017–2019) – Elle Woods
- Fiddler on the Roof (2017) – Hodel
- My Fair Lady (2018–2021) – Eliza Doolittle
- SHOW BOY (2019)
- Rose's Dilemma (2021) – Arlene
- Crest of the Royal Family (2021) – Carol Reed

=== Japanese dub ===
- Frozen (2013) – Anna
- SpongeBob, Your Fired (2013) - SpongeBob SquarePants
- It Came From Goo Lagoon (2014) - SpongeBob SquarePants
- Goodbye, Krabby Patty? (2017) - SpongeBob SquarePants
- Ralph Breaks the Internet (2018) – Anna
- Frozen II (2019) – Anna
- SpongeBob’s Big Birthday Blowout (2019) - SpongeBob SquarePants
- Once Upon a Snowman (2020) – Anna

=== Theatrical animation ===
- GAMBA (2015) – Shioji
- Sword Art Online The Movie: Ordinal Scale (2017) – Yuna
- Space Battleship Yamato 2202: Warriors of Love (2017)

=== Television animation ===
- Good Luck Girl! (2012) – Nadeshiko Adenokouji
- Unlimited Fafnir (2015) – Miyako Shinomiya
- Convenience Store Boy Friends (2017) – Miharu Mashiki
- Real Girl (2018) – Ezomichi
- Sword Art Online: Alicization – War of Underworld (2020) – Yuna
- Idoly Pride (2021) – Mana Nagase

=== Video games ===
- Danganronpa V3: Killing Harmony (2017) – Kaede Akamatsu
- Let It Die (2017) – Kiwako Seto
- SpongeBob HeroPants (2015) - SpongeBob SquarePants
- Kingdom Hearts III (2019) – Anna
- Accel World vs. Sword Art Online: Millennium Twilight (2017) – Yuna
- Sword Art Online: Fatal Bullet (2018) – Yuna
- Idoly Pride (2021) – Mana Nagase
