= Real Girl (film) =

- Film poster

Japanese name
- Kanji: 3D彼女 リアルガール
Transcriptions
- Revised Hepburn: 3D Kanojo Riaru Gāru
- Directed by: Tsutomu Hanabusa
- Screenplay by: Tsutomu Hanabusa; Noboru Konomizu
- Based on: Real Girl by Mao Nanami
- Produced by: Takuya Ito; Yasushi Utagawa
- Starring: Ayami Nakajo; Hayato Sano; Hiroya Shimizu; Yuri Tsunematsu; Moka Kamishiraishi; Yutaro
- Cinematography: Takashi Komatsu
- Edited by: Naoichiro Sagara
- Music by: Masaru Yokoyama
- Production companies: Nippon TV; Warner Bros. Pictures; CTV; Dentsu; FBS; HTV; Parco; Ten Carat; Kodansha; VAP; Miyagi Television Broadcasting; Sapporo Television Broadcasting; SDT; Yomiuri TV; Nippon Shuppan Hanbai; GYAO!; DN Dream Partners; Dub, Inc.
- Distributed by: Warner Bros. Pictures
- Release date: September 14, 2018 (Japan)
- Running time: 115 minutes
- Country: Japan
- Language: Japanese

Real Girl (Japanese: 3D彼女 リアルガール, Hepburn: 3D Kanojo Riaru Gāru) is a 2018 Japanese film adaptation of the manga series by Nanami Mao. A live-action film adaptation directed by Tsutomu Hanabusa and distributed by Warner Bros. was released in Japanese theaters on September 14, 2018. The theme song of the film, Bedtime Stories by Kana Nishino.

== Cast ==
- Ayami Nakajo as Iroha Igarashi
- Hayato Sano as Hikari Tsutsui
- Hiroya Shimizu as Mitsuya Takanashi
- Yuri Tsunematsu as Ishino Arisa
- Moka Kamishiraishi as Sumie Ayado
- Yutaro as Yuto Ito
- Takahiro Miura as Shingo Mabuchi
- Sayaka Kanda as Ezomichi (voice)
- Mari Hamada as Tsutsui Norie
- Riki Takeuchi as Mitsuru Tsutsui
