= A Man′s World =

1971 film directed by Yasuharu Hasebe

A Man's World
- Film poster
- Directed by: Yasuharu Hasebe
- Screenplay by: Kōichi Saitō
- Starring: Yūjirō Ishihara; Tamio Kawachi; Joe Shishido; Ryōhei Uchida; Masaya Oki; Hideji Ōtaki
- Music by: Hajime Kaburagi
- Distributed by: Nikkatsu
- Release date: January 13, 1971 (Japan)
- Running time: 82 minutes
- Country: Japan
- Language: Japanese

A Man's World (Japanese: 男の世界) is a 1971 Japanese film directed by Yasuharu Hasebe. Yūjirō Ishihara produced the film by himself and made his final appearance in the Nikkatsu film.

== Premise ==
Konno's girlfriend was killed by Shiraishi. He left Japan to forget it. But Konno goes back to Japan for the first time in five years from Canada.

== Cast ==
- Yūjirō Ishihara as Tadao Konno
- Joe Shishido as Kenzo Shiraki
- Ryōhei Uchida as Tsuyushi Shiraishi
- Tamio Kawachi as Funada
- Masaya Oki as Osamu Ogata
- Hideji Ōtaki as Tatsukichi Agawa
