= Hiroshi Katsuno =

Japanese actor (born 1949)

- Born: July 27, 1949 (age 76); Kumamoto, Japan
- Occupation: Actor
- Years active: 1972–present
- Agent: Studio K Group
- Spouse: Kathy Nakajima (1979–present)
- Children: Nanami Katsuno; Kanae Katsuno; Yōsuke Katsuno

Hiroshi Katsuno (勝野 洋, Katsuno Hiroshi; born July 27, 1949 in Kumamoto) is a Japanese actor. He graduated from Aoyama Gakuin University. Katsuno's debut was as a detective Texas in the television series Taiyō ni Hoero! in 1974 and he won great popularity through the role. The episode his character Texas was killed recorded 42.5% audience rating, it was highest audience rating in Taiyō ni Hoero!.

== Filmography ==
=== Film ===
Year	Title	Role	Director	Notes	Ref.
1978	Blue Christmas	Oki	Kihachi Okamoto	Lead role	
1982	The Last Hero	Keishi Ooki	Haruki Kadokawa		
1983	Shōsetsu Yoshida gakkō	Yasuhiro Nakasone	Shirō Moritani		
1987	Aitsu ni Koishite	Taku Shinjo	Police officer		
1993	Bloom in the Moonlight	Daikichi Taki	Shinichiro Sawai		
2005	Yamato	Nobue Morishita	Junya Sato		
2006	Sun Scarred				
2009	Rookies: Graduation	Takuma Chiba	Yūichiro Hirakawa		
2014	Over Your Dead Body	Michisaburō/Matazaemon	Takashi Miike		
2020	The Sun Stands Still	Professor Otabe	Eiichirō Hasumi		
2023	Be My Guest, Be My Baby		Mitsuhito Shiraha		

=== Television ===
Year	Title	Role	Network	Notes	Ref.
1974–76	Taiyō ni Hoero!	Officer Jun "Texas" Mikami	NTV		
1978-79	Sanshiro Sugata	Sanshiro Sugata	NTV	Lead role	
1979	Oretachi wa Tenshi da!	Katsura	NTV		
1983	Tokugawa Ieyasu	Tokugawa Hidetada	NHK	Taiga drama	
1987	Dokuganryū Masamune	Tokugawa Hidetada	NHK	Taiga drama	
1988	Takeda Shingen	Ōkuma Tomohide	NHK	Taiga drama	
1990-93	Shogun Iemitsu Shinobi Tabi	Yagyū Jūbei	TV Asahi		
1991	Taiheiki	Hōjō (Akahashi) Moritoki	NHK	Taiga drama	
1991	Onihei Hankachō	Sakai Yūsuke	Fuji TV		
1992	Nobunaga: King of Zipangu	Hosokawa Fujitaka	NHK	Taiga drama	
1994	Hana no Ran	Ibuki Jūrota	NHK	Taiga drama	
1998	Tokugawa Yoshinobu	Kondō Isami	NHK	Taiga drama	
2000	Aoi	Ii Naomasa	NHK	Taiga drama	
2005	1 Litre no Namida	Yoshifumi Asō	Fuji TV		
2006	Kōmyō ga Tsuji	Shibata Katsuie	NHK	Taiga drama	
2011	Saka no Ue no Kumo	Murakami Masamichi	NHK		
2014	Gunshi Kanbei	Niwa Nagahide	NHK	Taiga drama	
2016	Kamen Rider Ghost	Adonis	TV Asahi		
