= Toru Watanabe =

Japanese actor and singer (1961–2022)

- Born: 12 May 1961; Oyama, Tochigi, Japan
- Died: 28 November 2022 (aged 61); Tokyo, Japan
- Occupations: Actor; singer

Toru Watanabe (Japanese: 渡辺 徹, Hepburn: Watanabe Tōru; 12 May 1961 – 28 November 2022) was a Japanese actor and singer. He starred in Taiyō ni Hoero! (1981), Yoake no Runner (1983), and Kaze no Naka no Aitsu (1984), and won the 1985 Elan d'or Award for Newcomer of the Year. He released several singles, one of which topped at #2 on the Oricon Singles Chart.

== Biography ==
=== Early life ===
Watanabe was born on 12 May 1961 in Oyama, Tochigi. His mother worked as a poster girl for a local restaurant her family ran, and his father worked as a nagashi accordionist. The family moved frequently, around "the heart of the Kantō Plain, on the borders of Ibaraki, Tochigi, Gunma, and Saitama prefectures", and he once lived in a six-story tenement house in the Kosuna area in Koga, Ibaraki. He was educated at Ibaraki Prefectural Koga Third High School. He later attended the Bungakuza Theatre Institute and joined the agency in 1985.

=== Media career ===
In 1981, he debuted as Junji Takemoto/Rugger in the TV drama Taiyō ni Hoero!, before starring in the 1984 Nippon TV drama Kaze no Naka no Aitsu. In 1987, he played Hiroshi Kiyomitsu in the film Actress. He won the 1982 Golden Arrow Award for Best Newcomer in Broadcasting. He starred in his film debut in Yoake no Runner (1983). He was one of the winners of the 1985 Elan d'or Award for Newcomer of the Year.

In 1982, he released his first single "Kare (Rival)". He rose to popularity with his second single "Yakusoku", made for Glico Almond Chocolate commercials, topping at #2 on the Oricon Singles Chart. Three more singles, "Ai no Naka e" (1982), "Yaketsuku Memory", and "Again" (both 1983), reached the top 30 of the same chart. He also appeared on several variety shows. He appeared alongside Jackie Chan in Kirin Company's commercial for its Nama A Beer. The Yomiuri Shimbun noted that he had a reputation for his cheerful personality.

Watanabe also performed on the stage for several decades, including at Bungakuza. He won the 2000 Kikuta Kazuo Theater Prize Theater Award for his roles as Teppei Ōmori in Akasatana and Yamauchi Kazutoyo in Kōmyō ga Tsuji.

In 2019, he served as the emcee of the opening and closing ceremonies of the 74th National Athletic Meet in Ibaraki Prefecture.

=== Illness and death ===
Watanabe suffered from chronic health problems. He was reportedly a voracious eater, consuming 6,000 calories a day, and he normally ate six meals a day, including three bento boxes during filming. He once peaked at 130 kg (290 lb), before slimming down to 90 kg (200 lb), and he was later diagnosed with diabetes. After having a heart attack, he was diagnosed with ischemic heart disease in April 2021, underwent surgery for aortic valve stenosis in May, and was discharged from the hospital with a weight of 79 kg (174 lb). He resumed activities in July 2021. He dropped out of several planned stage performances due to his illness that year. He often underwent dialysis due to chronic kidney failure from diabetes.

On 19 November 2022, his final appearance before his death was a remote appearance at the Akita University Medical Forum; despite his precautionary negative COVID test, the forum had gone remote. After returning to Tokyo the next day, he was diagnosed with bacterial gastroenteritis and hospitalized. He died of sepsis at 9:01 p.m. on 28 November 2022. He was 61.

A family funeral was held in Tokyo on 5 December, with his eldest son as the chief mourner, and the same day his wife and eldest son held a joint press conference about his death. His dharma name was "Yōkōin Kentoku Tetsushinkoji (陽光院賢徳徹真居士)". A farewell ceremony was held at the Grand Prince Hotel Takanawa on 28 March 2023, with approximately 1,200 people in attendance.

=== Personal life ===
After co-starring together in Kaze no Naka no Aitsu, Watanabe married singer and actress Ikue Sakakibara in October 1987. Their wedding reception took place at Grand Prince Hotel Takanawa and was broadcast live on Nippon Television Network, hosted by Kazuo Tokumitsu and reaching an audience rating of 40.1%. The couple had two children, actors Yūta and Takuya. In 1993, after reports surfaced that he had been having an affair with a 27-year-old model for more than nine months; he denied the affair at a press conference.

Watanabe had also spoken about his experiences with death threats made by a maternal uncle against his father. Watanabe built two houses in Setagaya, both after each of his sons was born; by 2022, the latter was worth an estimated 400 million yen.

Watanabe loved mayonnaise so much that he secretly consumed it even though his wife, worried about his health, limited the condiment in the household. At his farewell ceremony, attendees received a specially designed bottle of mayonnaise in his honour.

== Filmography ==
- Sorobanzuku (1986)
- Actress (1987), Hiroshi Kiyomitsu
- Linking Love (2017), Ken'ichirō Mashio
- Miracle in a Spiny Bur: The Chestnut Family of Kasama (2018), Takashi Furuya

== Discography ==
=== Albums ===
Title	Details
Kakenukeru made (駆け抜けるまで…)	Released: 1982; Label: Epic/Sony
Talking (in all-caps)	Released: 1 January 1983; Label: Epic/Sony
Dramatic Road (ドラマティック・ロード)	Released: 21 November 1983; Label: Epic/Sony
Mr. Sentimental (Mr.センチメンタリスト)	Released: 21 March 1986; Label: Epic/Sony

=== Singles ===
Title	Year	Details	Peak chart positions	Sales
Title	Year	Details	JPN	Sales
"Rival" (彼《ライバル》)	1982	Released: 1982; Label: Epic/Sony	—	—
"Yakusoku" (約束)	1982	Released: 25 August 1982; Label: Epic/Sony	2	—
"Ai no Naka e" (愛の中へ)	1982	Released: 10 December 1982; Label: Epic/Sony	6	—
"Yaketsuku Memory" (灼けつくメモリー)	1983	Released: 21 May 1983; Label: Epic/Sony	27	—
"Again" (stylized in all-caps)	1983	Released: 21 September 1983; Label: Epic/Sony	21	—
"Hitomi Serious" (瞳・シリアス)	1984	Released: 1 May 1984; Label: Epic/Sony	—	—
"Ki ni Naru Aitsu" (気になるあいつ)	1985	Released: 1985; Label: Epic/Sony	—	—
"Netsujō" (熱情)	1986	Released: 1 February 1986; Label: Epic/Sony	—	—
"Vitamine CM" (ビタミンCM)	1991	Released: 10 April 1991; Label: Warner Pioneer	—	—
"Tōi Yume ni Aeru made" (遠い夢に逢えるまで) (with Kuniko Yamada)	1995	Released: 27 September 1995; Label: Toshiba EMI	—	—

== Awards ==
Year	Award	Category	Work(s)	Result	Ref.
1982	20th Golden Arrow Awards	Golden Arrow Award for Best Newcomer in Broadcasting		Won	
1985	9th Elan d'or Awards	Newcomer of the Year	Himself	Won	
2000	26th Kikuta Kazuo Theater Awards	Kikuta Kazuo Theater Prize Theater Award	Teppei Ōmori in Akasatana and Yamauchi Kazutoyo in Kōmyō ga Tsuji	Won	
