= Mami Nomura =

Japanese actress

Mami Nomura (野村真美, Nomura Mami) (born October 19, 1964) is a Japanese actress from Yokohama, Kanagawa Prefecture, Japan. She is a member of the Tōhō Geinō agency. A versatile actress, she appears in contemporary and historic roles. Since 1990, she has portrayed Yōko in the TBS series Wataru Seken wa Oni Bakari.

Mami made her debut in 1985. She has appeared as a guest or regular in numerous television specials and series, and in four films. Television series include Mama-tachi ga Sensō o Hajimeta!! (1985) and the 1989 NHK Taiga Drama Kasuga no Tsubone, in which she played Senhime. Another jidaigeki role was in Minami Machi Bugyō Jikenchō.

Her film appearances have included the 1986 production of Ōoku and Yoshiwara Enjō (1987).

== Filmography ==
=== Television ===
- Kasuga no tsubone (1989) – Senhime

=== Film ===
- Edo Jō Tairan (1991)
