= It's a Summer Vacation Everyday =

1994 film by Shūsuke Kaneko

- DVD cover
- Directed by: Shūsuke Kaneko
- Written by: Shusuke Kaneko; Yumiko Ōshima
- Produced by: Sadatoshi Fujimine
- Starring: Shirō Sano; Hinako Saeki; Hitomi Takahashi; Tōru Masuoka; Akira Onodera; Jun Fubuki
- Cinematography: Kōzō Shibasaki
- Edited by: Isao Tomita
- Music by: Kow Otani
- Distributed by: Kuzui Enterprises
- Release date: 11 June 1994 (Japan)
- Running time: 94 minutes
- Country: Japan
- Language: Japanese

It's a Summer Vacation Everyday (Japanese: 毎日が夏休み, Hepburn: Mainichi ga natsuyasumi) is a 1994 Japanese film directed by Shūsuke Kaneko. Actress Hinako Saeki won the Newcomer of the Year award at the Japan Academy Awards and Best New Talent at the Yokohama Film Festival for her performance in this film.

== Cast ==
- Shirō Sano
- Hinako Saeki
- Hitomi Takahashi
- Tōru Masuoka
- Akira Onodera
- Jun Fubuki

== Sources ==
- 毎日が夏休み (in Japanese). Japanese Movie Database.
- Mainichi ga natsuyasumi at IMDb
- 毎日が夏休み. www.shusuke-kaneko.com (in Japanese).
- "Variety Japan" 毎日が夏休み (in Japanese). Variety (Japanese edition).
