= Misato Tanaka =

Japanese actress (born 1977)

- 田中 美里
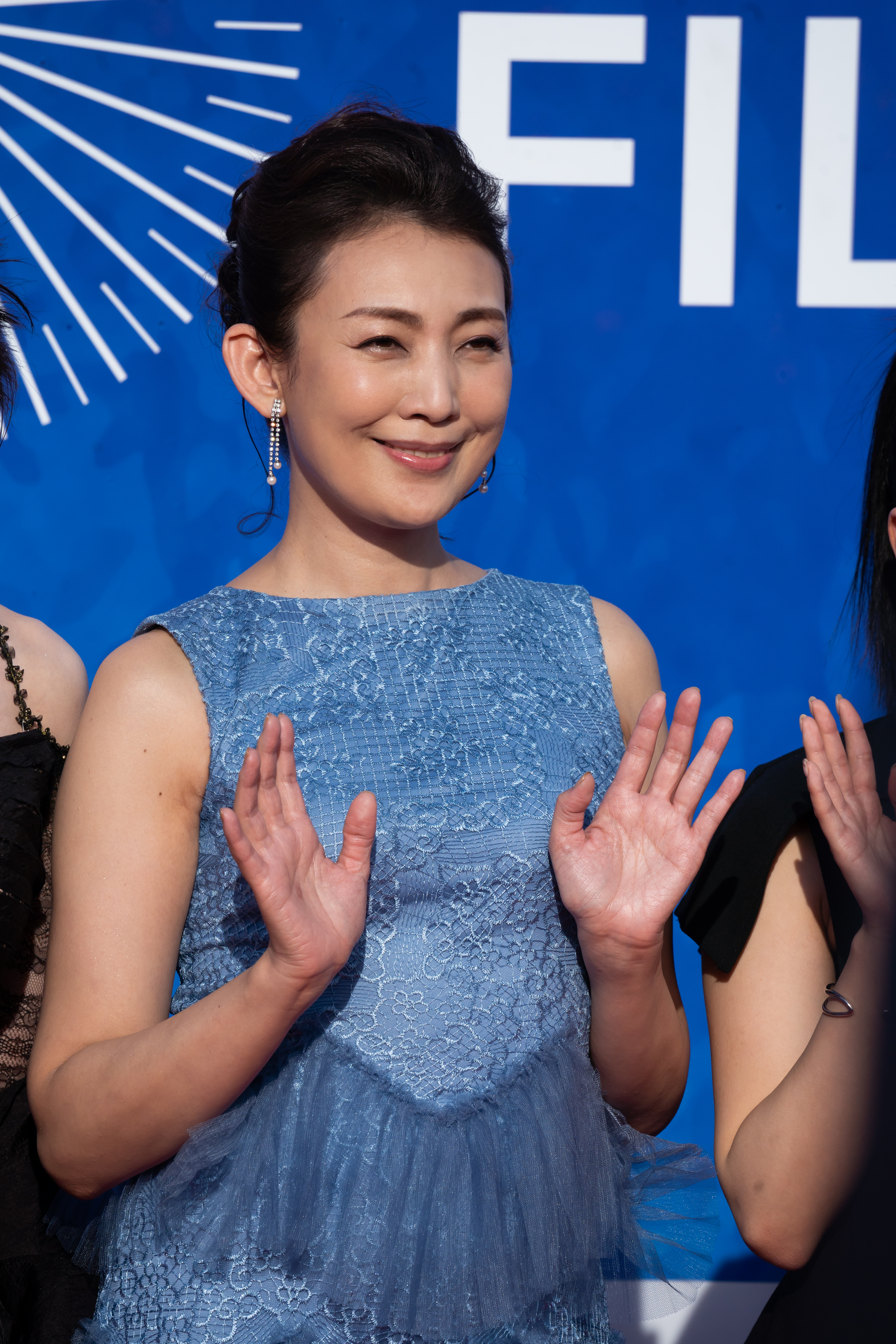
- May 2023 in Yokohama
- Born: 9 February 1977 (age 49); Kanazawa, Ishikawa, Japan
- Occupations: Actress, model
- Years active: 1996–present
- Website: www.am-ple.co.jp

Misato Tanaka (田中 美里, Tanaka Misato; born 9 February 1977) is a Japanese actress.

== Biography ==
Tanaka started appearing on stage as a child. She won an award at Toho's Cinderella contest in 1996 and landed the starring role in the NHK Asadora Aguri in 1997, which significantly launched her career. She would later play Kiriko Tsujimori in Godzilla vs. Megaguirus (2000), and even have a cameo appearance in Godzilla Against Mechagodzilla (2002) as Nurse Tsujimori.

== Filmography ==
=== Films ===
- The Black House (1999)
- Godzilla vs. Megaguirus (2000), Kirko Tsujimori
- Misuzu (2001), Misuzu Kaneko
- Godzilla Against Mechagodzilla (2002), Nurse
- Crying Out Love in the Center of the World (2004), Ritsuko's Mother
- Tantei Jimusho 5: 5 Number de Yobareru Tanteitachi no Monogatari (2005)
- Bride of Noto (2008)
- Cobalt Blue (2009)
- Quartet! (2012)
- From Kobe (2015)
- Sadako vs. Kayako (2016), Fumiko Takagi
- Ashita ni Kakeru Hashi (2018)
- Ninomiya Kinjirō (2018), Nami
- The Dignified Death of Shizuo Yamanaka (2020), Sachiko Imai
- Go! Go! Sakura Club (2023)
- From Spice with Love (2023)
- Be My Guest, Be My Baby (2023)
- Miharu ni Kasa o (2025), Tōko
- It's a Wonderful Life (2025)
- Ryuji (2026), Akemi

=== Television ===
==== Series ====
- Agri (1997), Aguri Mochizuki
- Best Partner (1997)
- With Love (1998)
- The One Stringed Harp (2000)
- Toshiie and Matsu (2002), Oichi
- Midnight Rain (2002)
- Korogashi Ogin (2003)
- New Woman of the Crime Lab 6 (2005), ep.2* Sono otoko, fuku shocho: Kyoto kawara machi sho jiken fyairu (2007)
- Romeo and Juliet (2007)
- Sono otoko, fuku shocho: Season 2 (2008)
- Detective Conan: Kudo Shinichi e no Chousenjou (2011), Chisato Nagata (ep.5)
- The Pioneers (2012), Junko Yoshizaki
- Mielino Kashiwagi (2013), Tanaka (ep.6–7)
- The Island Teacher (2013)
- Doraemon's Mother: The Story of Nobuyo Oyama (2015), Michiko Nomura

==== TV movies ====
- Good Job (2007)
- Gate of Flesh | Nikutai no Mon (2008)
- Dr. Hisayoshi Suma | Gekai Suma Hisayoshi (2010), Yoko Miyamoto
- Kikyo, The Return (2019)

=== Dubbing ===
- Choi Ji-woo
  - Winter Sonata (NHK / 2003~2004), Jeong Yoo-jin
  - Beautiful Days (NHK / 2003~2004), Kim Yeon-soo
  - Stairway to Heaven (TV Fuji, BS Fuji / 2004), Han Jung-suh / Kim Ji-soo
  - Everybody Has Secrets (Film / 2004), Han Seon-yeong
  - First Love (NHK / 2005), Kang Suk-hee
  - Now and Forever (Film / 2005), Han Hye-won
  - The Romantic President (Film / 2005), Choi Eun-soo
  - First Kiss (Film / 2005), Song Yeon-hwa
  - Winter Sonata Anime (2009), Jeong Yoo-jin
