= Masaya Oki =

Japanese actor and singer

- Born: Jōji Kusunoki; 12 June 1952; Beppu, Ōita, Japan
- Died: 28 June 1983 (aged 31); Keio Plaza Hotel, Shinjuku, Tokyo, Japan
- Occupation: Actor
- Years active: 1968–1983

Masaya Oki (沖 雅也, Oki Masaya; 12 June 1952 – 28 June 1983) was a Japanese actor and singer who appeared in many films and television series.

== Life ==
He was born in Beppu, Ōita, as Jōji Kusunoki (楠 城児, Kusunoki Jōji). Because of his parents' divorce, he left his home and went to Tokyo. In the same year, he debuted as a film actor at the Nikkatsu studio. In 1969, he received the Elan d'or Award for Newcomer of the Year. Oki was playing lead role in Toshiya Fujita's film " Wet Sand in August" but was forced to drop off in a motorcycle accident while shooting.

He gradually won popularity through his roles in television dramas such as Hissatsu series and Taiyo ni Hoero!. In 1979, Oki played lead role in Oretachi wa Tenshi da! on NTV and won new popularity.

In 1975, he became an adopted child of his talent agency president, Tadao Hikage.

Oki was one of the most influential candidates for the role of Capt. Yonoi in Nagisa Oshima's film in Merry Christmas, Mr. Lawrence, but he had to step down because of his illness.

He ended his life by leaping from the top of a 47-story building, the Keio Plaza Hotel. He suffered from bipolar disorder. His suicide note for Hikage was "Dad, I'm waiting in Nirvana." (おやじ、涅槃でまってる, Oyaji, nehan de matteru.)

== Films ==
- Arushojonokukuhaku Junketsu (1968)
- Zenka Karishakuho (1969)
- Zenka Dosuarashi (1969)
- Hanahiraku Musumetachi (1969)
- Yakuzano Yokogao (1970)
- Kirikomi (1970)
- Earth Ninja Chronicles: Duel in the Wind (1970)
- Shinjuku Outlaw: Step On the Gas (1970) as Rikiya
- Kantō Exile (1971)
- A Man′s World (1971) as Osamu Ogata
- Za Gokiburi (1973)
- The War in Space (1977) as Reisuke Muroi
- Queen Bee (1978) as Rentarō Tamon
- Kitamura Toya Wagafuyunouta (1978) as Ishizaka Kozen
- Hi no Tori (The Phoenix) (1978) as Uraji
- Blue Christmas (1978) as Harada
- Toward the Terra (1980)
- Koto (also known as Koto, the Ancient City) (1980) as Ryusuke Mizuki

== Television ==
- Key Hunter (From episode210)
- Hissatsu series
  - Hissatsu Shiokinin (1973) as Kanoke no Joe
  - Hissatsu Shiokiya Kagyō (1975) as Ichimatsu
  - Hissatsu Karakurinin Fugakuhiyakkei Koroshitabi (1978) as Tōjūrō
- Taiyō ni Hoero! ("Scotch") (1976–77) (1980-1982) as Taki Ryūichi
- Daitsuiseki (1978) as Yabuki Shirō
- Sanshiro Sugata as Higaki Gennosuke/ Higaki Tesshin
- Oretachi wa Tenshi da! (1979) as Asō Masato
- Shin Edo no Kaze (1980-1981) as Tachibana Seiichirō
- Edo no Asayake (1981)
- Ōoku (1983) as Tokugawa Iemitsu
