= Sawa Suzuki =

Japanese actress

- 鈴木 砂羽
- Born: September 20, 1972 (age 53); Naka-ku, Hamamatsu, Shizuoka Prefecture, Japan
- Occupation: Actress
- Years active: 1992 - present
- Agent: Monday
- Spouse: Sumihiro Yoshikawa (m. 2011; div. 2015)

Sawa Yoshikawa (吉川 砂羽, Yoshikawa Sawa; born 20 September 1972, in Naka-ku, Hamamatsu, Shizuoka Prefecture, Japan), better known by her stage name Sawa Suzuki (鈴木 砂羽, Suzuki Sawa), is a Japanese actress represented by the talent agency Monday.

== Biography ==
After dropping out of the Joshibi University of Art and Design Junior College, Suzuki became a research student at Bungakuza.

In 1994, after her institute graduation, she starred in her debut film, Ai no Shinsekai, alongside Reiko Kataoka. The film's director, Kinema Junpo, won the 37th Blue Ribbon Rookie Award and the Sponichi Newcomer Award in the Grand Prix of the Mainichi Film Award.

Suzuki married the actor Sumihiro Yoshikawa on October 5, 2011, but they divorced in August 2015.

In 2012, she released her first essay, Joyū Geki-ba, from Wanibooks.

== Filmography ==
=== Television specials ===
Year	Title	Role	Notes	Ref.
2015	Doraemon, Haha ni Naru ~Ōyama Nobuyo Monogatari~	Nobuyo Ōyama	Lead role; single episode drama	
2026	Grass for My Pillow	Rie Yuki	Television film	

=== Films ===
Year	Title	Role	Notes	Ref.
2023	Old Car			
2025	Godmother: Life of Ayako Koshino	Junko Koshino		
2026	The Imaginary Dog and the Lying Cat			
2026	Euthanasia Special Zone			
