= Blue Christmas (film) =

1978 film by Kihachi Okamoto

- Film poster
- Directed by: Kihachi Okamoto
- Written by: Sō Kuramoto
- Produced by: Kenji Kakiuchi; Michio Morioka
- Starring: Hiroshi Katsuno; Keiko Takeshita; Eiji Okada; Kaoru Yachigusa; Masaya Oki
- Cinematography: Daisaku Kimura
- Edited by: Yoshitami Kuroiwa
- Music by: Masaru Sato
- Release date: 23 November 1978 (Japan)
- Running time: 133 minutes
- Country: Japan
- Language: Japanese

Blue Christmas (Japanese: ブルークリスマス, Hepburn: Burū Kurisimasu), also known as Blood Type: Blue or The Blue Stigma, is a 1978 Japanese science fiction film by director Kihachi Okamoto. It deals with prejudice against UFO witnesses whose blood is turned blue by the encounter.

== Cast ==
- Hiroshi Katsuno : Oki Taisuke
- Keiko Takeshita : Nishida Saeko
- Kunie Tanaka : Nishida Kazuo
- Masaya Oki : Harada
- Eiji Okada : Hyodo
- Kaoru Yachigusa
- Hideyo Amamoto
- Yoshio Inaba
- Shin Kishida
- Naoko Otani
- Etsushi Takahashi as Sawaki
- Sachio Sakai : Taxi driver
- Yoshio Inaba : Commander
- Eitaro Ozawa : Godai
- Ichirō Nakatani : Usami
- Hideji Ōtaki : Takeiri
- Shinsuke Ashida : Aiba
- Tatsuya Nakadai : Minami Kazuya
