= Hitomi Takahashi (actress) =

Japanese actress

Hitomi Takahashi (高橋 ひとみ, Takahashi Hitomi; born August 23, 1961 in Tokyo, Japan) is a Japanese actress.

== Selected filmography ==
=== Film ===
- Fruits of Passion (1981)
- Jealousy Game (1982)
- Double Bed (1983)
- Wangan Doro (1984)
- Farewell to the Ark (1984)
- It's a Summer Vacation Everyday (1994)
- Rebirth of Mothra (1996)
- Ultraman Cosmos: The First Contact (2001)
- Honey and Clover (2008)
- Aristocrats (2021)
- The End of the Pale Hour (2022)
- Baian the Assassin, M.D. 2 (2023)
- Love Will Tear Us Apart (2023)
- Kyojo: Reunion (2026)
- Kyojo: Requiem (2026)

=== TV ===
- Apples and Oranges (1983–1997)
- Hanekonma (1986)
