= Doraemon, Becoming a Mother ~The Story of Nobuyo Ōyama~ =

2015 Japanese biographical television drama

- Poster with the tentative title of Zutto Issho Dayo ~Seiyū Ōyama Nobuyo Monogatari~ featuring a photograph of Ōyama.
- ドラえもん、母になる〜大山のぶ代物語〜
- Genre: Autobiography; Serial; documentary
- Based on: I Was Doraemon: 26 Years of Tears and Laughter by Nobuyo Ōyama My Interesting Life by Nobuyo Ōyama My Wife is Doraemon by Keisuke Sagawa
- Screenplay by: Ryuji Inagaki
- Directed by: Eiji Ishii
- Starring: Sawa Suzuki; Kōsuke Toyohara; Tsubaki Nekoze; Misato Tanaka; Naoya Ogawa; Taku Suzuki; Kinako Kobayashi; Tetsuhiro Ikeda
- Narrated by: Noriko Ohara
- Music by: Shunsuke Kikuchi
- Country of origin: Japan
- Original language: Japanese

Production
- Executive producers: Satoshi Chiba; Asako Takagi
- Production companies: NHK; TV MAN UNION, INC.

Original release
- Release: December 13, 2015

Doraemon, Becoming a Mother ~The Story of Nobuyo Ōyama~ (ドラえもん、母になる〜大山のぶ代物語〜, Doraemon, Haha ni Naru ~Ōyama Nobuyo Monogatari~) is a Japanese autobiographical television drama directed by Eiji Ishii with a screenplay written by Ryuji Inagaki.

Produced by NHK and TV MAN UNION, INC., the drama details the biographical life story of voice actress Nobuyo Ōyama, who voiced the titular character in the Doraemon anime television series from 1979 to 2005 and her struggles during the time.

Announced in November 2015 following the public announcement of Ōyama's dementia earlier that year, the drama premiered on the NHK BS Premium channel's "Premium Drama" programming block in Japan on December 13 of that year.

== Cast ==
Role	Actor
Nobuyo Ōyama	Sawa Suzuki
Keisuke Sagawa	Kōsuke Toyohara
Noriko Ohara	Tsubaki Nekoze
Michiko Nomura	Misato Tanaka
Kazuya Tatekabe	Naoya Ogawa
Kaneta Kimotsuki	Taku Suzuki
Ms. Kobayashi	Kinako Kobayashi
Koji Hashimoto	Tetsuhiro Ikeda
Additional roles	Ganz Morita; Matsuda Hokuto; Gen Ueda; Toshiki Yamaguchi; Natsu Miyamoto (uncredited); Yumiko Tomokura (uncredited); Misaki Kamata (uncredited)

Noriko Ohara provided the drama's narration. The roundtable segments feature Doraemon voice actors Ohara, Michiko Nomura, and Kaneta Kimotsuki with the anime's producer Sōichi Besshi. Ōyama's husband Keisuke Sagawa is interviewed in the drama. Ōyama herself recorded lines for use in the drama.

== Production ==
Months following the public reveal of Ōyama's diagnosis with dementia earlier that year, the television drama was first announced to be in production on November 13, 2015 with actress Sawa Suzuki announced to portray Ōyama. It was initially reported on websites and magazines under the tentative title of "Together for a Long Time: The Story of Voice Actress Nobuyo Ōyama" ("Zutto Issho Dayo ~Seiyū Ōyama Nobuyo Monogatari~").

When she was initially offered the role of Ōyama for the drama, Suzuki felt a huge mix of surprise and joy, as she had never portrayed someone different than her and that while she was a cat person, never expected to be able to portray Ōyama. She wondered for a bit if she could even take on the role before deciding to accept because she wanted to "express how the 'Doraemon' character we are all familiar with today was actually created."

Suzuki did not try to replicate Ōyama's voice for her performance from the beginning, as she felt it was a "one-of-a-kind voice" and wanted to portray Ōyama as "not just a voice actress, but a woman." She didn't particularly think about reading references to help build the character because she's read Doraemon manga ever since she was a child. She consulted co-star Kōsuke Toyohara, who portrayed Ōyama's husband Keisuke Sagawa in the drama, on how to respectfully portray specific aspects of Ōyama's life as a woman such as her struggles with infertility and aimed to show how Ōyama was able to serve as a maternal presence in children's lives and bring joy to them through the character of Doraemon.

Regarding the pressure of portraying both Doraemon and Ōyama, Suzuki said, "The excitement of getting to play Nobuyo Ōyama, whose voice and appearance are completely different from my own, came first."

She then reflected, "Of course, I knew she was battling an illness, so I was shocked at the time, but I guess an actor's spirit just takes over. Since our voices are completely different, I was filled with curiosity and excitement about how the director, myself, and the rest of the cast would bring this all together."

In late November, a press conference was held in Tokyo, with the main cast members for the drama attending. There, a producer on the drama revealed that the actors were cast in their roles based on the Doraemon characters the voice actors portrayed rather than the voice actors themselves. Taku Suzuki, the actor who portrayed Kaneta Kimotsuki in the drama, was surprised upon hearing, as he had been "verbally abused" on Twitter when it was announced that he would be portraying Kimotsuki in the drama. He then revealed that he was referred to as Doraemon character Suneo throughout his elementary school, junior high, and high school years, much to the surprise of the other cast members, who reacted with surprise and telling him that he does resemble Suneo. Suzuki then expressed his delight in "having become Suneo", as he has admired the character ever since he was a child, before remarking with a serious look to "please stop saying bad things about me on Twitter", which made the venue laugh. Naoya Ogawa, the actor who portrayed Kazuya Tatekabe in the drama, then said that when he received the offer to portray Tatekabe, he "knew he wanted to do the part," as his nickname has been Gian ever since he was in elementary school. The rest of the cast members burst into laughter at this and remarked at how they knew it and that he had even resembled the Doraemon character of Gian.

One day before the drama's premiere broadcast, Misato Tanaka, the actress who portrayed Michiko Nomura in the drama, posted on her online blog about how she hoped through her performance as Nomura that she'd be able to get closer to Nomura's "strong, gentle and lovely" personality and image.

The drama is based on three books, "My Interesting Life" (Watashi no Omoshiro Jinsei) (Kosaido Publishing, ISBN 978-4-3315-0178-8), published in 1984, "My Wife is Doraemon" (Kami-san wa Doraemon) (Futabasha, ISBN 978-4-5752-9295-4), published in 2001, and "I Was Doraemon: 26 Years of Tears and Laughter" (Boku, Doraemon Deshita: Namida to Warai no 26-Nen Uchiaobanashi) (Shogakukan, ISBN 978-4-0938-7654-4), published in 2006.

== Release ==
The television drama premiered in Japan through the NHK BS Premium channel's "Premium Drama" programming block on December 13, 2015.

Following Ōyama's death in September 2024, the drama was re-broadcast on December 29 of that year. It was re-broadcast the following year in 2025.
