= Akira Onodera =

Japanese actor (born 1943)

- Born: September 19, 1943 (age 83); Hokkaido, Japan
- Occupation: Actor
- Years active: 1968–present
- Website: https://www.from1-pro.jp/talent/detail.php?id=11

Akira Onodera (Japanese: 小野寺 昭, Hepburn: Onodera Akira; born September 19, 1943 in Hokkaido) is a Japanese actor and narrator. He is well known for his role as Denka in Taiyō ni Hoero!. He made his television debut in 1969 with Panto Akogare.

In 2015, Onodera won the award for best supporting actor of Tokyo Sports Film Award for Ryuzo and the Seven Henchmen.

== Selected filmography ==
=== Films ===
- 226/Four Days of Snow and Blood (1989)
- It's a Summer Vacation Everyday (1994)
- Gamera: Guardian of the Universe (1995)
- Tsuribaka Nisshiseries
- Aibō the Movie (2008)
- Amalfi: Rewards of the Goddess (2009)
- Ryuzo and the Seven Henchmen (2015)

=== Television ===
- Taiyō ni Hoero! (1972-1980) as Shima Kimiyuki
- Ōgon no Hibi (1978) as Konishi Yukinaga
- Oretachi wa Tenshi da! (1979) as Lawyer Fujinami
- On'yado Kawasemi (1980–83)
- Hissatsu Shikirinin (1984) as Shinkichi
- Aoi (2000) as Kyōgoku Takatsugu
- The Grand Family (2021) as Tabuchi
