= Kokontei Shinba =

Kokontei Shinba (古今亭 志ん馬) is a professional rakugo name. As of October 2013, it had been used officially by 9 rakugo storytellers, and unofficially by 11. Since for the first two of them their years of birth and death are unknown, the 9th user of the name is sometimes considered to be the 7th user (for example, the Japan Rakugo Association's website).

== List of users ==
1. Details unknown
2. Real name: Morikawa Yujiro.
3. Took over the name in 1910.
4. Took over the name in 1917. Real name: Kanagawa Rinsaburo (1889-1961). Called colloquially Yokohama no Shinba ("The Shinba from Yokohama").
5. Took over the name in 1924.
6. Took over the name in 1925.
7. Took over the name in 1943.
8. Took over the name in 1966. Real name: Inada Masafumi (1935-1994).
9. Took over the name in 1997. Real Name: Yoshino Keiichi (1958-2013).
