= Oretachi wa Tenshi da! =

Japanese TV series

- Written by: Hideki Ogawa
- Directed by: Togorō Tsuchiya; Ryō Kinoshita
- Starring: Masaya Oki
- Country of origin: Japan
- Original language: Japanese
- No. of episodes: 20

Production
- Producer: Hirokichi Okada
- Running time: 45 min.
- Production company: Toho

Original release
- Network: Nippon TV
- Release: April 15 – November 4, 1979

Oretachi wa Tenshi da! (俺たちは天使だ!) is an action and comedy Japanese TV series starring Masaya Oki, originally broadcast on Nippon TV in 1979. The show won great popularity in its time. It is noted for the ad-libbing and jokes by the cast and staff.

== Plot ==
Masato Asō was a detective at Nizuma police station but was forced to resign. He sets up an office in a building in Aoyama as a private detective. Asō solves various incidents taking advantage of his former profession. He is always trying to get a lot of money even in nearly illegal ways through work from clients. But eventually, it always ends up not working. Each of Asō private detective office's members has their own profession, but helps Aso's investigation as a part-time job. They have unique nicknames.

== Cast ==
=== Asō's private detective office members ===
- Masaya Oki as Masato Asō (Cap)
- Yumi Takigawa as Youko Fujinami (You), a secretary of Asō
- Kyōhei Shibata as Shōzō Irie (Darts)
- Masaki Kanda as Jun Serizawa (Jun)
- Atsushi Watanabe as Itaru Shimaoka (Navi)

=== Niizuma Police station detectives ===
- Tōru Emori as Detective Nagumo, Asō's former boss
- Hiroshi Katsuno as Detective Katsura, Asō's former colleague and close friend
- Keiji Mikage as Detective Kanazawa, Asō's former colleague
- Yuji Yokotani as Detective Jimbo (Gorilla)

=== Others ===
- Akira Onodera as Lawyer Fujinami
- Naomi Hase as Kumiko, a secretary of Fujinami
- Tappei Shimokawa as Harada
- Taisaku Akino as Suehiro Teppie

== Staff ==
- Producer: Hirokichi Okada
- Music: SHOGUN
- Action director: Kunishirō Hayashi (Hayashi appeared as an actor in episode 16.)
