= Sei Hiraizumi =

Japanese actor

Sei Hiraizumi (平泉 成, Hiraizumi Sei; born on June 2, 1944, in the former Nukata, Aichi) is a Japanese actor. In 1964, Hiraizumi joined Daiei Film company and started his acting career. In the 1970s to early 1980s, he appeared in a lot of jidaigeki and detective television dramas as a guest villain actor.

Hiraizumi starred as Koichi Matsudo in L: Change the WorLd and he also starred in Osaka Tough Guys.

== Filmography ==
=== Film ===
- The Snake Girl and the Silver-Haired Witch (1968)
- Like a Rolling Stone (1994)
- Shin Godzilla (2016), Yūsuke Satomi
- 189 (2021)
- Soul at Twenty (2022)
- My Small Land (2022)
- Thousand and One Nights (2022)
- Confess to Your Crimes (2023)
- Tomorrow in the Finder (2024)
- One Last Throw (2025), Sawai
- Emergency Interrogation Room: The Final Movie (2025)

=== Television ===
- The Women of Osaka Castle (1983), Akechi Mitsuhide
- Tokugawa Ieyasu (1983), Ii Naomasa
- The Family (2007)
- Idaten (2019), Ōkuma Shigenobu
- Reach Beyond the Blue Sky (2021), Shibusawa Sōsuke
