= Sengoku Night Blood =

Japanese video game and anime series

戦刻ナイトブラッド (Sengoku Naito Buraddo)
- Video game
- Developer: Marvelous Entertainment; Kadokawa; Otomate
- Publisher: Marvelous Entertainment
- Platform: Android, iOS
- Released: JP: May 29, 2017
- Anime television series
- Directed by: Katsuya Kikuchi
- Produced by: Masazumi Katō; Yūsuke Yoshiwara; Jun Nakajima; Yi Wang
- Written by: Yūko Kakihara
- Music by: Naoyuki Horiko
- Studio: Typhoon Graphics
- Licensed by: NA: Crunchyroll
- Original network: Tokyo MX, Sun TV, TV Aichi, BS11
- Original run: October 3, 2017 – December 26, 2017
- Episodes: 12
- Manga
- Written by: Akito Ono
- Published by: KADOKAWA
- Imprint: MF Comics Gene Series
- Magazine: Monthly Comic Gene
- Original run: July 2017 – October 2018
- Volumes: 3
- Novel

Sengoku Night Blood – Uesugi Arc: The Jewel in the Palm
- Written by: Yuu Mitsuru
- Published by: KADOKAWA
- Imprint: Kadokawa Beans Bunko
- Published: October 27, 2017

Sengoku Night Blood (戦刻ナイトブラッド, Sengoku Naito Buraddo) was a Japanese free-to-play otome game, developed as a collaboration between Marvelous Entertainment, Kadokawa, and Idea Factory's Otomate. It was released in Japan on May 29, 2017, for Android and iOS devices. A 12-episode anime television series adaptation by Typhoon Graphics aired between October 3 and December 26, 2017. A Nintendo Switch port of the game was planned, but it was announced on October 24, 2019, that the Switch port was cancelled along with the mobile game being discontinued on December 25, 2019.

== Characters ==
=== Protagonist ===
Yuzuki (結月)
Voiced by: Rie Kugimiya
A kind-hearted and strong-willed girl originally from Japan before she was transported to the world of Shinga. There, she meets the various armies of the Sengoku era, all of whom are members of the Gekka Tribe, mainly supernatural creatures such as vampires, werewolves and oni. Yuzuki is special in that her blood possesses an ability to initiate "Awakenings" of the members of the Gekka Tribe, to allow them to unleash the latent power of their respective race, which increases their strength greatly and virtually becomes a decisive trump card in battle. She is tasked by a certain Himemiko, a mysterious woman whose blood possessed the same qualities, to unite Shinga, in hopes of being able to return to her original world.

=== Vampires/Toyotomi Army ===
Toyotomi Hideyoshi (豊臣 秀吉)
Voiced by: Natsuki Hanae
The general of the Toyotomi army. Previously, he was a peasant who rose to be under the care of Nobunaga, only to separate due to a turn of events, and now views him as an archenemy. While appearing playful and light-hearted on the surface, he possesses an extremely crafty and ruthless side, which gives him the advantage in battle. He enjoys teasing Yuzuki, affectionately calling her his "bride", and has a pet monkey named Toukichi who is always by his side. In the manga and anime series, he is the male lead.
Ishida Mitsunari (石田 三成)
Voiced by: Yoshihide Sasaki
The most level-headed and logical of the Toyotomi army, he is known for being extremely polite, diligent, and efficient with his work, specialising in filling in the routine, day-to-day tasks Hideyoshi frequently neglects.
Kuroda Kanbee (黒田 官兵衛)
Voiced by: Shunsuke Takeuchi
Hideyoshi's trusted advisor, the Toyotomi army's main strategist and Hanbee's best friend. Always calm and quiet, he was the one who advised Hideyoshi to break away from Nobunaga previously.
Takenaka Hanbee (竹中 半兵衛)
Voiced by: Ryōta Ōsaka
The Toyotomi army's other strategist and Kanbee's best friend. He is characterised by his red umbrella, which he carries around with him everywhere, and the various butterfly patterns on his clothing. Despite his gentle and almost feminine appearance, he shares the same trait as Hideyoshi in being extremely reckless. Whenever Hideyoshi is bored, the two often play Go together.
Maeda Toshiie (前田 利家)
Voiced by: Ikkei Yamamoto
The Toyotomi army's main fighter. Cheerful and optimistic, he is characterised by the many scars on his bare chest and his reckless behaviour. While poor at thinking and strategising, his lack of hesitation and spirit makes him a great fighter on the battlefield.

=== Vampires/Oda Army ===
Oda Nobunaga (織田 信長)
Voiced by: Toshiyuki Morikawa
The general of the Oda army and famed all over Shinga as "The Demon King of the Sixth Heaven" for his ruthless and cold demeanour. As his name portrays, he is unafraid to take risks and does not worry about how people view him, as his eyes are solely focused on uniting Shinga. He is very possessive of Yuzuki and his commanders are his biggest fans.
Akechi Mitsuhide (明智 光秀)
Voiced by: Nobunaga Shimazaki
The kind, gentlemanly thinker in the Oda army, who mainly serves as an information relayer and reporter to Nobunaga. Previously when the Toyotomi army was still under the Oda army, he betrayed Nobunaga but failed to kill him, instead earning the latter's praise. Since then, out of guilt, he has continued to serve faithfully as his position.
Mori Ranmaru (森 蘭丸)
Voiced by: Yūsuke Kobayashi
The youngest commander, and the first to warm up to Yuzuki in the Oda army. He deeply respects Nobunaga and helps out around the castle whenever he can, whether it is something as simple and gruelling as housework. Like Hanbee, he has a very feminine appearance.
Shibata Katsuie (柴田 勝家)
Voiced by: Masakazu Morita
The Oda army's main fighter, who often goes head-to-head with Toshiie in battle. While he may appear rough and violent on the battlefield, he actually harbours a very emotional and kind heart, and is often very concerned over Yuzuki's adaptation to life in Shinga due to her coming from another world.
Niwa Nagahide (丹羽 長秀)
Voiced by: Tomoaki Maeno
A commander in the Oda army who specialises in observing the battlefield. He carries a sharp tongue to his fellow commanders and often reprimands Yuzuki for her carelessness and forgetfulness. Like Nobunaga, he is very possessive of her.

=== Werewolves/Uesugi Army ===
Uesugi Kenshin (上杉 謙信)
Voiced by: Kōsuke Toriumi
The highly righteous and dignified general of the Uesugi army. His most distinguishing characteristic is his strong belief in his morals, which he bases his army's goals upon. He is very traditional and enjoys activities such as poetry and playing the biwa.
Kakizaki Kageie (柿崎 景家)
Voiced by: Kazuyuki Okitsu
A commander in the Uesugi army known for his strength in battle. While brash and poor at calculations, he harbours a kind and helpful heart when it comes to his fellow comrades. A running gag is when he always requests for Kagemochi's help when it comes to dealing with women, in particular Yuzuki.
Amakasu Kagemochi (甘粕 景持)
Voiced by: Hikaru Midorikawa
The Uesugi army's resident "smooth man" due to his politeness and main strategist. He is easily suspicious of unfamiliar people, making him out to be very intelligent and cautious. He is also very shrewd when it comes to dealing with others and is highly aware of what goes on in the castle. A running gag is when Kageie always requests for his help when it comes to dealing with women, in particular Yuzuki.
Uesugi Kagekatsu (上杉 景勝)
Voiced by: Yoshihiko Aramaki
Kenshin's foster child. Due to him being the future heir to the Uesugi clan, he has a lot of pressure and expectations placed on him, often causing him to have moments of self-doubt. His personality is relatively similar to his father's in that they are both very gentle and serious when it comes to duty, but he tends to be a lot more trusting. He is also the first to warm up to Yuzuki upon her arrival in the Uesugi army.
Naoe Kanetsugu (直江 兼続)
Voiced by: Tetsuya Kakihara
A commander in the Uesugi army known for his strong suit in diplomacy. While appearing rough and stern at first glance, he simply just has a harsh way of talking, a strong sense of responsibility and plenty of confidence in himself and his comrades, which often give encouragement to the army.

=== Werewolves/Takeda Army ===
Takeda Shingen (武田 信玄)
Voiced by: Katsuyuki Konishi
The general of the Takeda army. Passionate and warm, he carries himself with great pride as the leader, but actually suffers from an incurable disease, which he takes pills to suppress. He harbours a rivalry with Kenshin, and has a hobby of making nice-smelling sachets, which he often gifts to Yuzuki.
Yamagata Masakage (山県 昌景)
Voiced by: Yoshiki Nakajima
The youngest and most hot-blooded commander of the Takeda army. He is often extremely active and frequently trains to improve his strength with Nobuharu in the gardens. Being the youngest and the most "innocent", he is often teased whenever it comes to contact with Yuzuki.
Kōsaka Masanobu (高坂 昌信)
Voiced by: Ryōhei Kimura
Naitō Masatoyo (内藤 昌豊)
Voiced by: Kōtarō Nishiyama
The shy commander and primary herbalist of the Takeda army, who is also responsible for making the pills Shingen frequently consumes. His eyes are always closed and due to his weak presence, he often surprises his comrades by seemingly appearing next to them suddenly. He kindly offers to teach Yuzuki how to be a herbalist when she enters the Takeda army.
Baba Nobuharu (馬場 信春)
Voiced by: Hiroki Yasumoto
The brusque and good-natured commander of the Takeda army. He is primarily seen training Masakage and his strength in battle is well-known.

=== Werewolves/Sanada Army ===
Sanada Yukimura (真田 幸村)
Voiced by: Daiki Yamashita
The kind-hearted and warm general of the Sanada army, and also Nobuyuki's younger brother. Previously, the Sanada army was under the Takeda army, but he chose to separate after deciding that his fellow commanders were more precious to him. He is well-known for being openly generous, which is uncharacteristic of a warlord.
Sanada Nobuyuki (真田 信之)
Voiced by: Showtaro Morikubo
The second-in-command of the Sanada army and Yukimura's older brother. He often reprimands Yukimura whenever the latter gets too reckless and is commonly the one that has to step in whenever Sasuke and Saizō argue.
Sarutobi Sasuke (猿飛 佐助)
Voiced by: Ayumu Murase
A ninja in the Sanada army noted for his wind techniques and childlikeness. He often quarrels with Saizō.
Kirigakure Saizō (霧隠 才蔵)
Voiced by: Ryō Kitamura
A ninja in the Sanada army noted for his earth techniques and narcissism. He often quarrels with Sasuke.
Yuri Kamanosuke (由利 鎌ノ助)
Voiced by: Taku Yashiro
A ninja in the Sanada army noted for his use of two chained sickles, which is an uncommon weapon. Unlike his two energetic partners, he is often sleepy, air-headed, calm, and has a very poor sense of direction.

=== Werewolves/Date Army ===
Date Masamune (伊達 政宗)
Voiced by: Yūichirō Umehara
The crafty and ruthless general of the Date army. Known as the "One-eyed Werewolf" due to his eyepatch and hair covering his right eye, he harbours a sharp tongue, but in actuality has a soft heart. These were brought about by his education that a commander must always say the contrary of what he feels. Due to the Date army's small size, he is determined to make a name for themselves out there and is unafraid of stooping to methods like manipulation and backstabbing. He is also an extremely good cook and practises falcon-hunting.
Date Shigezane (伊達 成実)
Voiced by: Nobuhiko Okamoto
The childlike and youngest commander of the Date army. Playful and energetic, he is considered a prodigy for his battle skills and abilities at his age, which can make him sometimes a bit arrogant. He often trains with Kojūrō.
Katakura Kojūrō (片倉 小十郎)
Voiced by: Takuya Satō
The oldest commander of the Date army, who often acts like a mother to the other two. He is often seen training Shigezane or handling routine tasks in the castle. Whenever Masamune feels doubtful of himself, he performs the flute for him.

=== Ogres/Mōri Army (Game only) ===
Mōri Motonari (毛利 元就)
Voiced by: Takehito Koyasu
Mōri Takamoto (毛利隆元)
Voiced by: Daisuke Hirakawa
Kikkawa Motoharu (吉川元春)
Voiced by: Yūki Ono
Kobayakawa Takakage (小早川隆景)
Voiced by: Kengo Kawanishi
Mōri Terumoto (毛利 輝元)
Voiced by: Shouta Aoi

== Media ==
=== Anime ===
A 12-episode anime television series adaptation by Typhoon Graphics aired between October 3 and December 26, 2017. The opening theme is "Tenka Zekkei" (天下絶景), performed by Daiki Yamashita, Katsuyuki Konishi, Kōsuke Toriumi, Natsuki Hanae, Toshiyuki Morikawa and Yūichirō Umehara. The series was streamed with English subtitles by Crunchyroll.

=== Manga ===
The manga adaptation began serialization in the July 2017 issue of Monthly Comic Gene and ended in the October 2018 issue.

No.	Japanese release date	Japanese ISBN
1	September 27, 2017	978-4-04-069420-7
2	March 27, 2018	978-4-04-069764-2
3	September 27, 2018	978-4-04-065114-9

=== Novel ===
The novel Sengoku Night Blood: Uesugi Arc – The Jewel in the Palm (戦刻ナイトブラッド 上杉の陣〜掌中之珠〜, Sengoku Naito Buraddo Uesugi no Jin ~Shōchū no Tama~; ISBN 978-4-04-106035-3) was written by Yuu Mitsuru, based on the Sengoku Night Blood Project. The character designs for the Uesugi Army were created by Shikisakigumi. It was published by KADOKAWA under the Kadokawa Beans Bunko imprint on October 27, 2017.

=== Web Radio ===
The web radio program, titled Sengoku Night Blood Web Radio "Sen Buradio" (戦刻ナイトブラッドWEBラジオ「戦ブラジオ」, Sengoku Naito Buraddo Webu Rajio "Sen Buradio"), aired every other Friday from April 28, 2017, to March 30, 2018, on Onsen and HiBiKi Radio Station. Episodes were also uploaded a few days later to the official Senki Night Blood YouTube channel. The show was hosted by Natsuki Hanae, who voiced Toyotomi Hideyoshi, and Shunsuke Takeuchi, who voiced Kuroda Kanbei.

=== Stage Play ===
From August 16 to 26, 2018, the production was staged at the Tennozu Galaxy Theatre, directed by Shinichi Ono with a script by Yūichi Toyome. The first cast announcement revealed that Kazuki Yamamoto and Yoshihiko Aramaki—who provide the character voices for Maeda Toshiie and Uesugi Kagekatsu in both the game and anime, would be appearing in the stage adaptation. Later, on March 25, 2018, the full cast was officially announced at Anime Japan 2018. The production featured Akazawa Tomoru as Toyotomi Hideyoshi, Sadamoto Fūma as Takenaka Hanbei, TAKA as Kuroda Kanbei, Kubota Hidetoshi as Oda Nobunaga, Matsumoto Hinata as Akechi Mitsuhide, Yokota Ryūgi as Mori Ranmaru, Hagio Keishi as Niwa Nagahide, Kishimoto Takuya as Shibata Katsuie, Maeyama Takahisa as Uesugi Kenshin, Jinnai Shō as Naoe Kanetsugu, Yamamoto Kazuki as Maeda Toshiie, and Aramaki Yoshihiko as Uesugi Kagekatsu.
