= Ten to Chi to (TV series) =

- Genre: Taiga drama
- Written by: Giho Sugiyama
- Directed by: Ei Okazaki etc
- Starring: Kōji Ishizaka; Fumie Kashiyama; Jukichi Uno; Ineko Arima; Ryūtarō Ōtomo; Osamu Takizawa; Tamao Nakamura; Makoto Fujita; Tappie Shimokawa; Kunishirō Hayashi; Hideo Takamatsu; Kōji Takahashi
- Theme music composer: Isao Tomita
- Opening theme: NHK Symphony Orchestra
- Country of origin: Japan
- Original language: Japanese
- No. of episodes: 52

Production
- Running time: 45 minutes

Original release
- Network: NHK
- Release: January 5 – December 28, 1969

Related
- Momino Kiwa Nokotta

Ten to Chi to (天と地と) is a 1969 Japanese television series. It is the 7th NHK taiga drama and the 1st to be televised in color.

Average viewership rating was 25.0% with the peak of 32.4%.

== Story ==
Ten to Chi to deals with the Sengoku period. Based on Chōgorō Kaionji's novels "Ten to Chi to". Now only episode 50 and a fragment of episode 2 exist.

The story chronicles the life of Nagao Kagetora from childhood until the climax of Battle of Kawanakajima against his rival, Takeda Shingen.

== Cast ==
=== Nagao/Uesugi clan ===
- Kōji Ishizaka as Nagao Kagetora
- Osamu Takizawa as Nagao Tamekage
- Takashi Yamaguchi as Nagao Masakage
- Takashi Shimura as Nagao Fusakage
- Jukichi Uno as Usami Sadamitsu
- Etsushi Takahashi as Usami Sadakatsu
- Yū Fujiki as Kakizaki Yajirō
- Hideo Takamatsu as Kanazu Shinbei
- Shirō Itō as Naya Tatsuzo
- Ineko Arima as Mats as Naya Tatsuzoue
- Goichi Yamada as Tokura Yohachiro
- Akira Nagoya as Kakizaki Yosaburo
- Noboru Nakaya as Sugihara Noriie
- Shunya Shimazaki as Kitajō Takahiro
- Yoshi Katō as Shoda Hitachinosuke
- Masakane Yonekura as Katō Danzō
- Taketoshi Naito as Honjō Yoshihide
- Hiroyuki Nagato as Hattori Genki
- Ineko Arima as Matsue
- Michiyo Aratama as Kesagozen

=== Takeda clan ===
- Kōji Takahashi as Takeda Shingen
- Masaru Nakamura as Takeda Katsuyori
- Teruhiko Aoi as Takeda Yoshinobu
- Tamao Nakamura as Suwagoryonin
- Jun Tazaki as Takeda Nobutora
- Ryūtarō Ōtomo as Itagaki Nobukata
- Kunishirō Hayashi as Morozumi Torasada
- Tappie Shimokawa as Oyamada Masatatsu
- Akira Yamauchi as Baba Nobuharu
- Kunio Murai as Kōsaka Masanobu

=== Others ===
- Ryōtarō Sugi as Oda Nobunaga
- Mitsuo Hamada as Kinoshita Tokichiro
- Ryunosuke Kaneda as Shibata Katsuie
- Seiji Matsuyama as Tokugawa Ieyasu
- Yasukiyo Umeno as Miyoshi Nagayoshi
- Gaku Yamamoto as Ashikaga Yoshiteru
- Shun Ōide as Ashikaga Yoshiaki
- Kazuo Kitamura as Murakami Yoshikiyo
- Makoto Fujita as Naya Heihachiro
- Asao Sano as Konoe Sakihisa
- Kan'emon Nakamura as Saito Dosan
- Tatsuo Matsumura as Ota Sukemasa
- Kohji Moritsugu as Hojo Ujimasa
- Rokkō Toura as Suwa Yorishige
- Masayuki Mori as Kosai
