= Shinagawa (disambiguation) =

Shinagawa is a ward in Tokyo. Named after it are:

- Shinagawa Station
- Shinagawa Seaside Station

== Family name ==
- Shinagawa Masakazu
- Shinagawa Yajirō

Fictional characters:

- Daichi Shinagawa, the main character of Flunk Punk Rumble (Yankee-kun to Megane-chan)
