= Hajikano =

Hajikano (written 初鹿野) is a Japanese surname. Notable people with the surname include:

- Hajikano Masatsugu (初鹿野 昌次, 1545–1624), Japanese samurai
- Hajikano Tadatsugu (初鹿野 忠次, 1533–1561), Japanese samurai
