= Kunishirō Hayashi =

Japanese actor, action director and martial artist

- Born: 1 January 1939; Tokyo, Japan
- Died: 29 October 2015 (aged 76)
- Occupation: Actor
- Years active: 1960-2015

Kunishirō Hayashi (林 邦史朗, Hayashi Kunishirō; 1 January 1939 – 29 October 2015) was a Japanese actor, action director, martial artist and sword fight arranger. He served as a sword fight arranger in almost all of the Taiga drama series on NHK in his lifetime. In 1963, he founded stunt performers production company Wakakoma action club.

His final appearance as an actor was in the 2016 Taiga drama series Sanada Maru, he played the role of Takeda Shingen. He was posthumously awarded a Lifetime Achievement Award at the 4th Japan Action Awards.

== Selected filmography ==
=== As an actor ===
- Taiga drama
  - Ten to Chi to (1969) as Morozumi Torasada
  - Kaze to Kumo to Niji to (1976) as Fujiwara no Hidesatos vassal
  - Dokuganryū Masamune (1987) as Matsubara Tamon
  - Hana no Ran (1994) as Asakura Takakage
  - Mōri Motonari (1997) as Shinagawa Daizen
  - Kōmyō ga Tsuji (2006) as Takenouchi Soemon
  - Tenchijin (2009) as Kamiizumi Hidetsuna
  - Sanada Maru (2016) as Takeda Shingen
- Taiyō ni Hoero! (1972) as an Assassin (ep.1)
- Oretachi wa Tenshi da! (1979) (ep.16)

=== As a sword fight arranger or Action director ===
- Taikōki (1965)
- Minamoto no Yoshitsune (1966)
- Lady Snowblood: Love Song of Vengeance (1973)
- Kunitori Monogatari (1973)
- Daitsuiseki (1978)
- Kusa Moeru (1979)
- Oshin (1983)
- Tokugawa Ieyasu (1983)
- Ghost Warrior a.k.a. Swordkill (1984)
- Sanada Taiheiki (1985)
- Wuthering Heights (1988)
- Aoi (2000)
- Shinsengumi! (2004)
- Yoshitsune (2005)
- Kōmyō ga Tsuji (2006)
- Fūrin Kazan (2007)
- Ryōmaden (2010)
- Gō (2011)
- Taira no Kiyomori (2012)
- Yae's Sakura (2013)
- Gunshi Kanbei (2014)
- Hana Moyu (2015)

=== Other appearances ===
- Weapon Masters (ep.5 Katana)

== Award ==
- Japan Action Award for Lifetime Achievement Award (2016)
