= Yū Fujiki =

Japanese actor (1931–2005)

Yu Fujiki
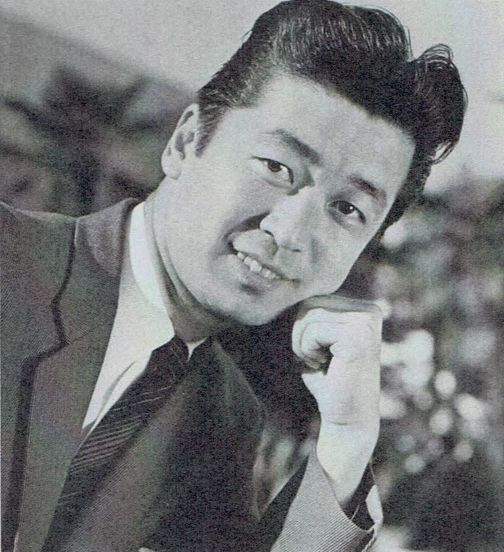
- Fujiki in 1956
- Born: Yūzō Suzuki; 2 March 1931; Tokyo, Japan
- Died: 19 December 2005 (aged 74); Tokyo, Japan
- Occupation: Actor
- Years active: 1954-2005
- Height: 180 cm (5 ft 11 in)
- Spouse: Akiko Fujiki

Yū Fujiki (藤木 悠, Fujiki Yū; 2 March 1931 – 19 December 2005), born Yūzō Suzuki (鈴木 悠蔵, Suzuki Yūzō), was a Japanese film and television actor. He appeared in more than 100 films from 1954 to 2005.

== Career ==
Born in Tokyo, Fujiki graduated from Doshisha University and joined the Toho studio in 1954. He began by playing straight male leads, but later shifted to more comical roles, especially in combination with Tadao Takashima. He left the studio in 1974 and found success on television in such series as G-Men '75.

== Filmography ==
=== Film ===
Year	Title	Role	Notes
1954	Saraba Rabauru		
1954	Mako osorubeshi		
1954	Doyoubi no tenshi		
1954	Yurei Otoko		
1955	Dansei No. 1	Ichiro Shimamura	
1955	Izumi e no michi		
1955	Otoko arite	Hiroshi Ônishi	
1955	Samurai II: Duel at Ichijoji Temple	Denshichiro Yoshioka	
1955	Geisha Konatsu: Hitori neru yo no Konatsu	Yamada	
1955	Ai no rekishi	Akihiko Ôhira	
1956	Rangiku monogatari		
1956	Kuro-obi sangokushi	Kotetsu	
1956	Furyô shônen	Shûzô Ukita	
1956	Nemuri Kyôshirô burai hikae		
1957	Throne of Blood	Washizu samurai	
1957	Hoshizora no machi		
1957	Taian kichijitsu		
1957	Kono futari ni sachi are		
1957	Zoku Sazae-san	Norio	
1957	Salaryman shusse taikôki	Kunihiro	
1957	Koto no tsume		
1957	The Lower Depths	Unokichi	
1957	Daigaku no samurai tachi	Okabe	
1957	Ippon-gatana dohyô iri	Nekichi	
1957	Zokuzoku Ôban: Dotô hen	Shop Employee	
1957	Sazae-san no seishun	Norio	
1958	Kusabuê no okâ		
1958	Yajikata dôchû sugoroku		
1958	Anzukko	Okada	
1958	Kekkon no subete		
1958	Kigeki ekimae ryokan		
1958	Doji o numana		
1958	Furanki no sannin mae		
1958	Kami no taisho		
1958	Jinsei gekijô - Seishun hen		
1958	The Hidden Fortress	Barrier guard	
1959	Kodama wa yonde iru	Ken'ichi HIrasawa	
1959	Aisaiki		
1959	Songokû		
1959	Sarariman shussetai koki daiyonbu	Kato	
1959	Shin santô jûyaku	Hikotarô Takeda	
1959	The Three Treasures	Okabi	
1959	Sarariman jikkai		
1959	Kashima ari		
1960	Samurai to oneechan	Ryôichi Kageyama	
1960	When a Woman Ascends the Stairs	Matsui (Miyuki's husband)	
1960	Yama no kanata ni - Dai ichi-bu: Ringo no hoo: Dai ni-bu: Sakana no seppun	Yamazaki	
1960	Hito mo arukeba	Kogoro Kindaichi	
1960	Kunisada Chûji	Gentetsu Shimizu	
1960	Shin santô jûyaku: Ataru mo hakke no maki	Tadao Minagawa	
1960	Shin santo juyaku: teishu kyo iku no maki		
1960	Happyaku-ya oshichi		
1960	Shin jôdaigaku		
1960	Gametsui yatsu		
1960	Sararîman Chûshingura	Akagaki	
1961	Ôsaka-jô monogatari	Danuemon Hanawa	
1961	Shusse kôsu ni shinro o tore		
1961	Zoku sararîman Chûshingura	Akagaki	
1961	Honkon no yoru		
1961	Toiretto shacho		
1961	Toilet buchô	Ôba	
1961	The End of Summer	Maruyama Rokutarou	
1961	Futari no musuko		
1961	Ganba		
1962	Salary man Shimizu minato	Ôiwa	
1962	Zoku sararîman shimizu minato		
1962	Long Way to Okinawa		
1962	Josei jishin	Isaburô Ishimoto	
1962	Nihon ichi no wakadaishô		
1962	Star of Hong Kong	Ôtsuka	
1962	King Kong vs. Godzilla	Kinsaburo Furue	
1962	Chūshingura: Hana no Maki, Yuki no Maki	Tadashichi Takebayashi	
1963	Onna ni tsuyoku naru kufû no kazukazu	Kinsaku Sano	
1963	Nippon jitsuwa jidai		
1963	Kawachi udoki-Oiroke hanjoki		
1963	Hawai no wakadaishô		
1963	Ringo no hana saku machi	Toshiyuki Sawada	
1963	Norainu sakusen		
1963	Oneechan sandai-ki	Kusakari	
1963	Atragon	Yoshito Nishibe	
1963	Honolulu, Tokio, Hong Kong	Policeman	
1964	Yearning	Mr. Nomizo, employee at rival supermarket of Morita's	
1964	Mothra vs. Godzilla	Jiro Nakamura	
1964	Hadaka no jûyaku		
1964	Chi to daiyamondo		
1964	Horafuki taikôki	Toshiie Maeda	
1964	Danchi: Nanatsu no taizai	6th Sin & 7th Sin-Toshio Aono	
1964	Hana no oedo no musekinin		
1965	Tameki no taisho		
1965	Senjo ni nagareru uta		
1965	Honkon no shiroibara	A chinese inspector	
1966	Musekinin Shimizu Minato		
1966	Onna no naka ni iru tanin		
1966	Kureji da yo: kisôtengai	Takebayashi	
1966	Tenamonya Tôkaidô		
1966	Jinchoge	Nomura	
1966	Neko no kyujitsu		
1966	Kore ga seishun da!	Nakagawa	
1967	Râkugoyarô-Daibakushô	Chuya Maruhashi	
1967	Kureji ogon sakusen		
1967	Take-chan shacho: Seishun de tsukkare!		
1967	Japan's Longest Day	Colonel Seike - Military Aide to the Emperor	
1967	Tenamonya yurei dochu	Hyobe Kuroiwa	
1967	Dekkai taiyô		
1967	Scattered Clouds	Ishikawa, Ayako's husband	
1967	Moero! Taiyô		
1968	Kawachi fûten zoku	Sanjirô	
1968	Isoroku	Staff Officer Fujii	
1968	Moero! Seishun	Shôjirô Arikawa	
1968	Kûsô tengoku	Kuroda	
1969	Go! Go! Wakadaishô	Kyoza Yokozawa	
1969	Furesshuman wakadaishô		
1969	Konto 55go: Jinrui no daijakuten		
1969	Nippon ichi no danzetsu otoko	Kishii	
1969	Mito Kômon man'yûki	Yadayû Ôno	
1969	Musume zakari	Yûzô Sagawa	
1970	Space Amoeba	Promotion Division Manager	
1970	Ore no sora da ze! Wakadaishô		
1970	Batsugun joshikôsei: 16 sai wa kanjichau	Akahori	
1970	Batsugun joshikôsei: Sotto shitoite 16 sai		
1971	Nishi no petenshi Higashi no sagishi	Uchida	
1973	Yubi-kun: Sarariman jingi		
1974	Isoge! Wakamono	Hirata	
1975	Ganbare! Wakadaishô		
1976	Gekitotsu! Wakadaishô		
1977	Kochira Katsushika-ku Kameari kôen mae hashutsujo		
1981	Kaettekita wakadaishô		
1981	Station	Ichiro Mikami	
1981	Chikagoro naze ka Charusuton		
1981	Sukkari... sono ki de!		
1982	The Highest Honor		Uncredited
1983	Jidai-ya no nyobo	Tonkichi no Oyaji	
1983	Daburu beddo	Man in TV drama	
1984	F2 grand prix		
1985	Jidai-ya no nyobo 2	Master of Tonkichi	
1986	Uemura Naomi monogatari	Mitsuo Ogawa	
1987	Ore wa otokoda! kanketsu-hen		
1991	Dai yûkai	President of Wakayama Broadcasting	
1996	Black Jack 2: Pinoko ai shiteru	Dr. Kani	
2001	Satorare		
2003	Nain souruzu	Restaurant Owner	
2005	Kita no zeronen	Kamejiro Nakano	(final film role)

=== Television ===
Year	Title	Role	Notes
1969	Ten to Chi to	Kakizaki Kageie	Taiga drama
1973	Bardie Daisakusen		
1974-1975	Ultraman Leo	Seiji Omura	51 episodes
1975-1979	G-Men '75	Hachibe Yamada	
1991	Taiheiki	Uesugi Norifusa	Taiga drama
1994	Hana no Ran	Nijō Mochimichi	Taiga drama
