= Japanese war fan =

Hand fans used in warfare in feudal Japan

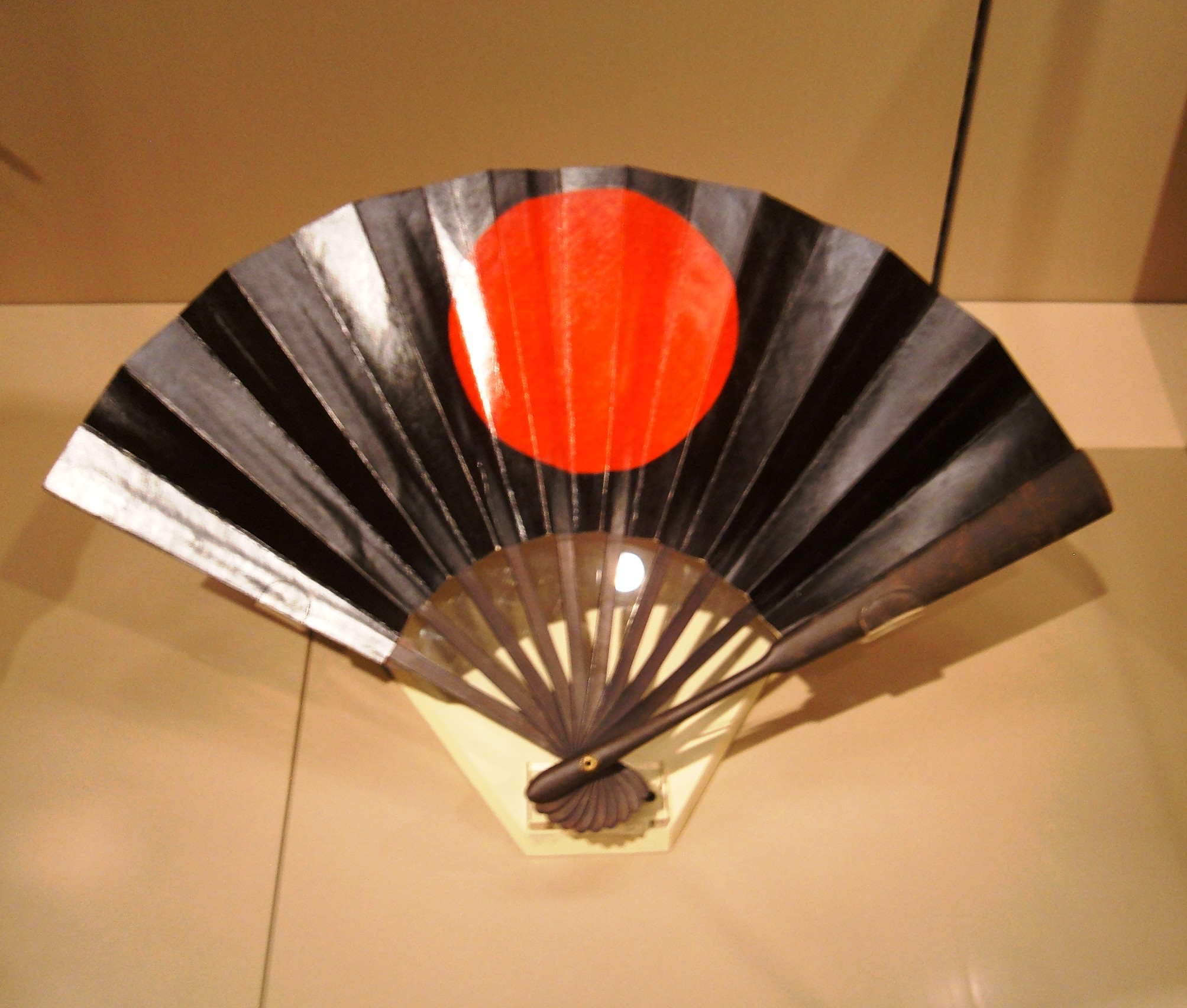
Antique Japanese (samurai) Edo period gunsen war fan, made of iron, bamboo and lacquer depicting the sun (1800–1850) on display at the Asian Art Museum in San Francisco, California

The Japanese war fan, or tessen (Japanese: 鉄扇,てっせん, romanized: tessen, lit. 'iron fan'), is a Japanese hand fan used as a weapon or for signalling. Several types of war fans were used by the samurai class of feudal Japan and each had a different look and purpose.

== Description ==
War fans varied in size, materials, shape, and use. One of the most significant uses was as a signalling device. Signalling fans came in two varieties:

- a folding fan that has wood or metal ribs with lacquered paper attached to the ribs and a metal outer cover
- a solid open fan made from metal and/or wood, similar to the gunbai used today by sumo referees.

The commander would raise or lower his fan and point in different ways to issue commands to the soldiers, which would then be passed on by other forms of visible and audible signalling.

War fans were also made as weapons. The art of fighting with war fans is tessenjutsu.

== Types ==
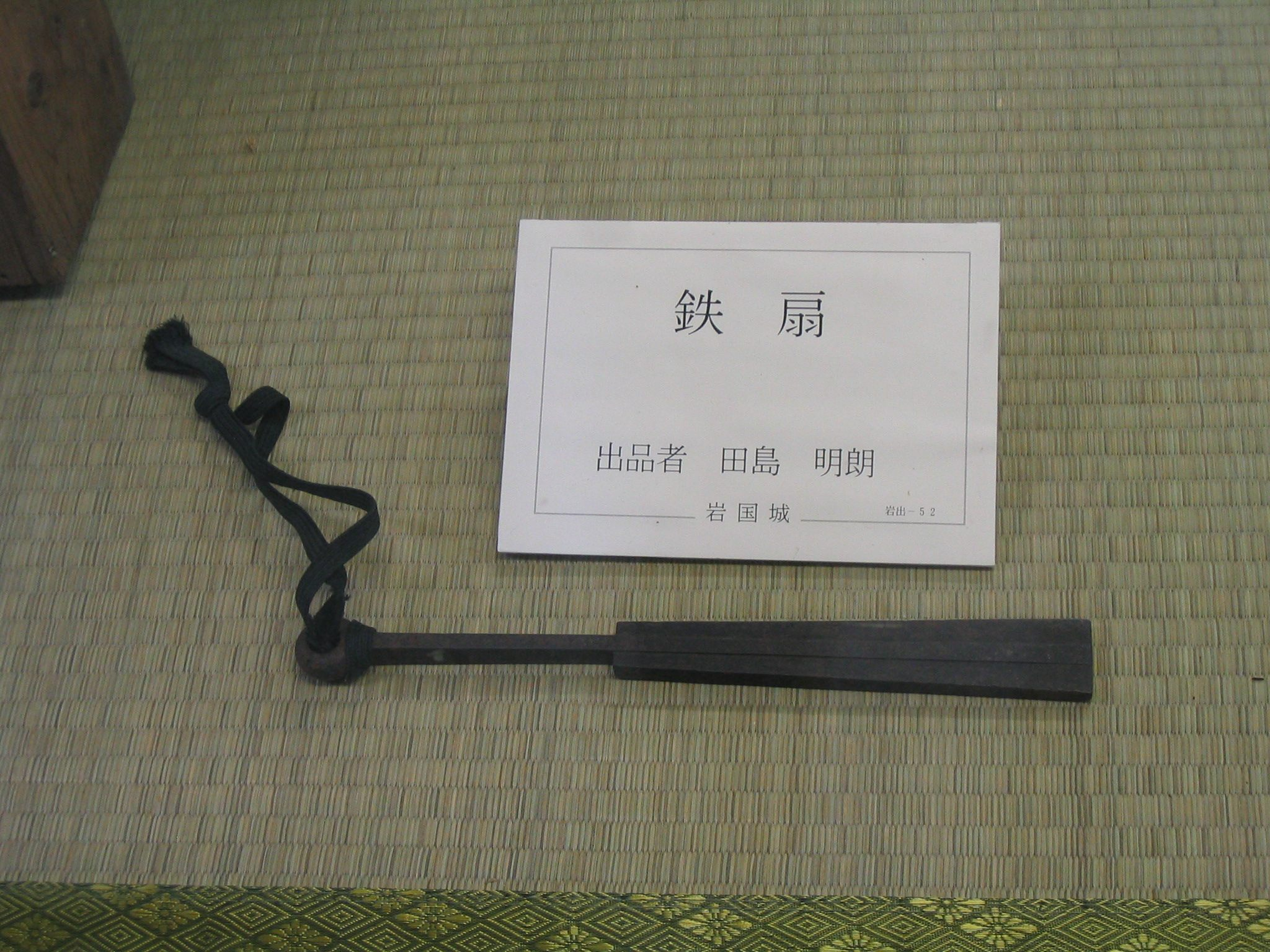
A tessen (iron fan) on display in Iwakuni Castle, Japan

- Gunsen were folding fans used by the average warriors to cool themselves off. They were made of wood, bronze, brass or a similar metal for the inner spokes, and often used thin iron or other metals for the outer spokes or cover, making them lightweight but strong. Warriors would hang their fans from a variety of places, most typically from the belt or the breastplate, though the latter often impeded the use of a sword or a bow.
- Tessen were folding fans with outer spokes made of heavy plates of iron designed to look like regular folding fans, or solid clubs shaped to look like a closed fan. Samurai could take these to places where swords or other overt weapons were not allowed, and some swordsmanship schools included training in the use of the tessen as a weapon. The tessen was also used for fending off knives and darts, as a throwing weapon, and as an aid in swimming.
- Gunbai were large, solid, open fans that high-ranking officers carried, which could be solid iron, metal with a wooden core, or solid wood. They were used to ward off arrows and used as a sunshade or to signal to troops.

== War fans in history and folklore ==
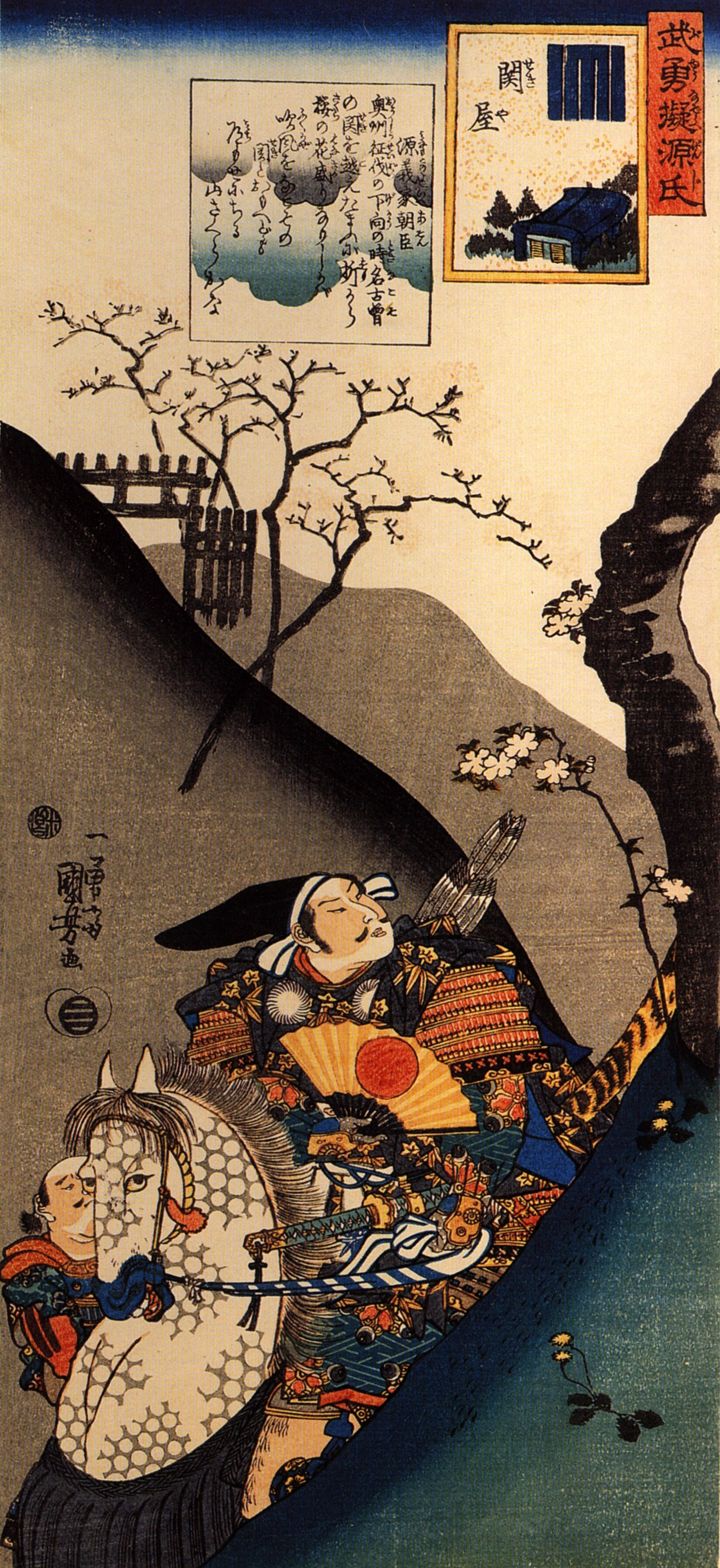
Minamoto no Yoshiie holds a Japanese war fan which has a symbol of the Japanese sun disc

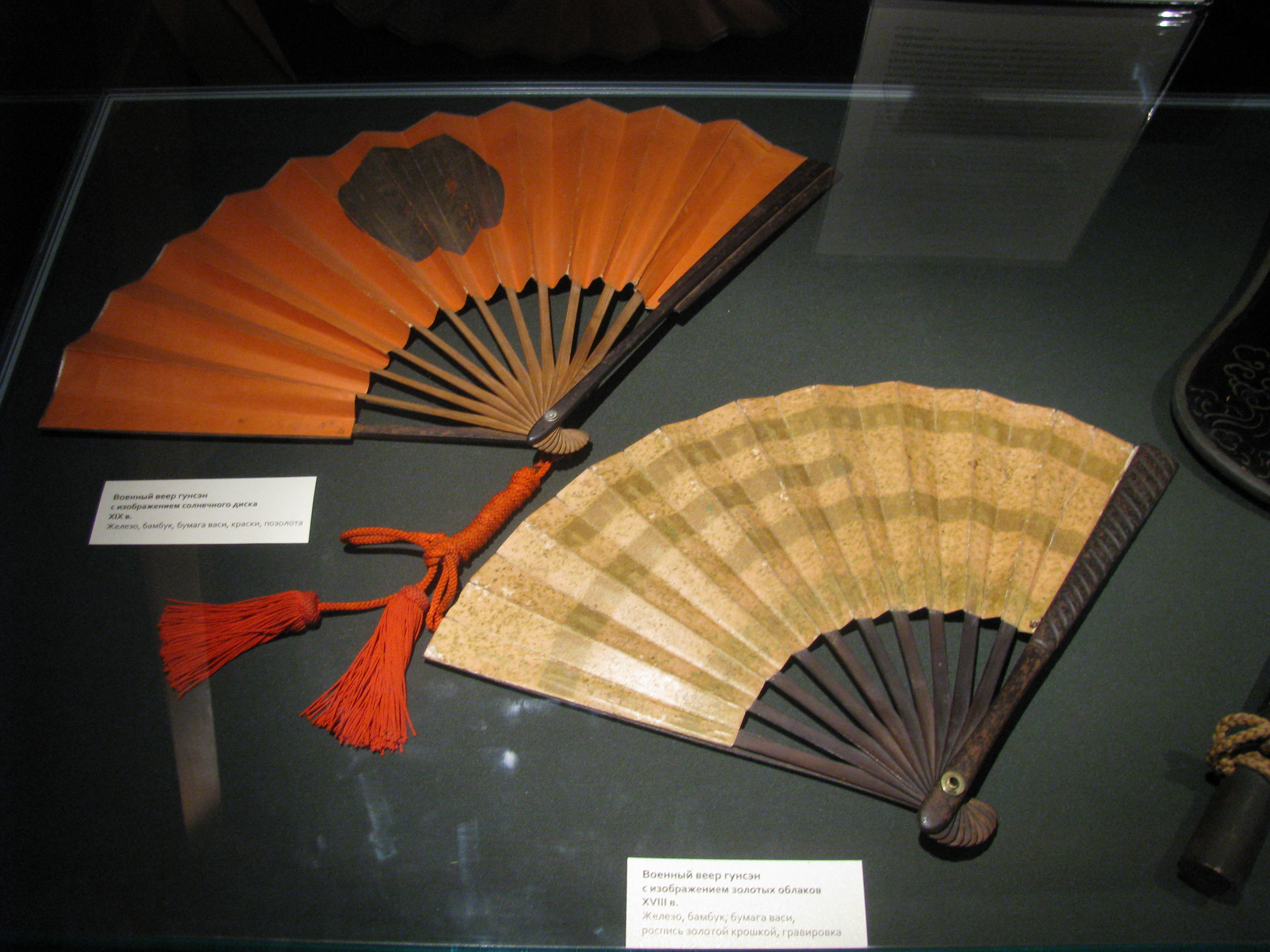
Japanese gunsen war fans

One particularly famous legend involving war fans concerns a direct confrontation between Takeda Shingen and Uesugi Kenshin at the fourth battle of Kawanakajima. Kenshin burst into Shingen's command tent on horseback, having broken through his entire army, and attacked; his sword was deflected by Shingen's war fan. It is not clear whether Shingen parried with a tessen, a dansen uchiwa, or some other form of fan. Nevertheless, it was quite rare for commanders to fight directly, and especially for a general to defend himself so effectively when taken so off-guard.

Minamoto no Yoshitsune is said to have defeated the great warrior monk Saitō Musashibō Benkei with a tessen.

Araki Murashige is said to have used a tessen to save his life when the great warlord Oda Nobunaga sought to assassinate him. Araki was invited before Nobunaga, and was stripped of his swords at the entrance to the mansion, as was customary. When he performed the customary bowing at the threshold, Nobunaga intended to have the room's sliding doors slammed shut onto Araki's neck, killing him. However, Araki supposedly placed his tessen in the grooves in the floor, blocking the doors from closing. His tessen saved his life that day.

The Yagyū clan, sword instructors to the Tokugawa shōguns, included tessenjutsu in their martial arts school, the Yagyū Shinkage-ryū.

== Gallery ==
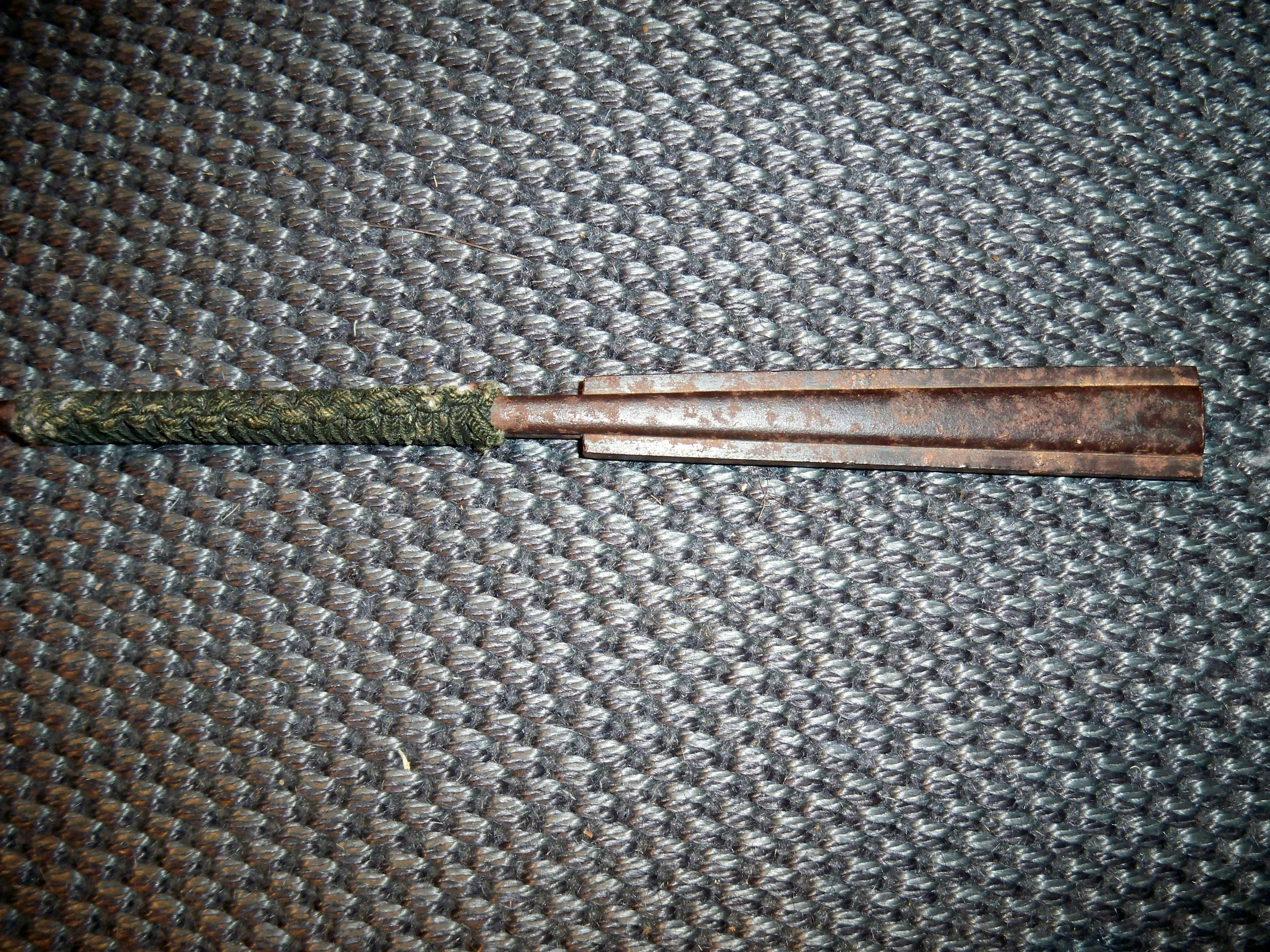
Edo period Japanese (samurai) solid iron tessen fan

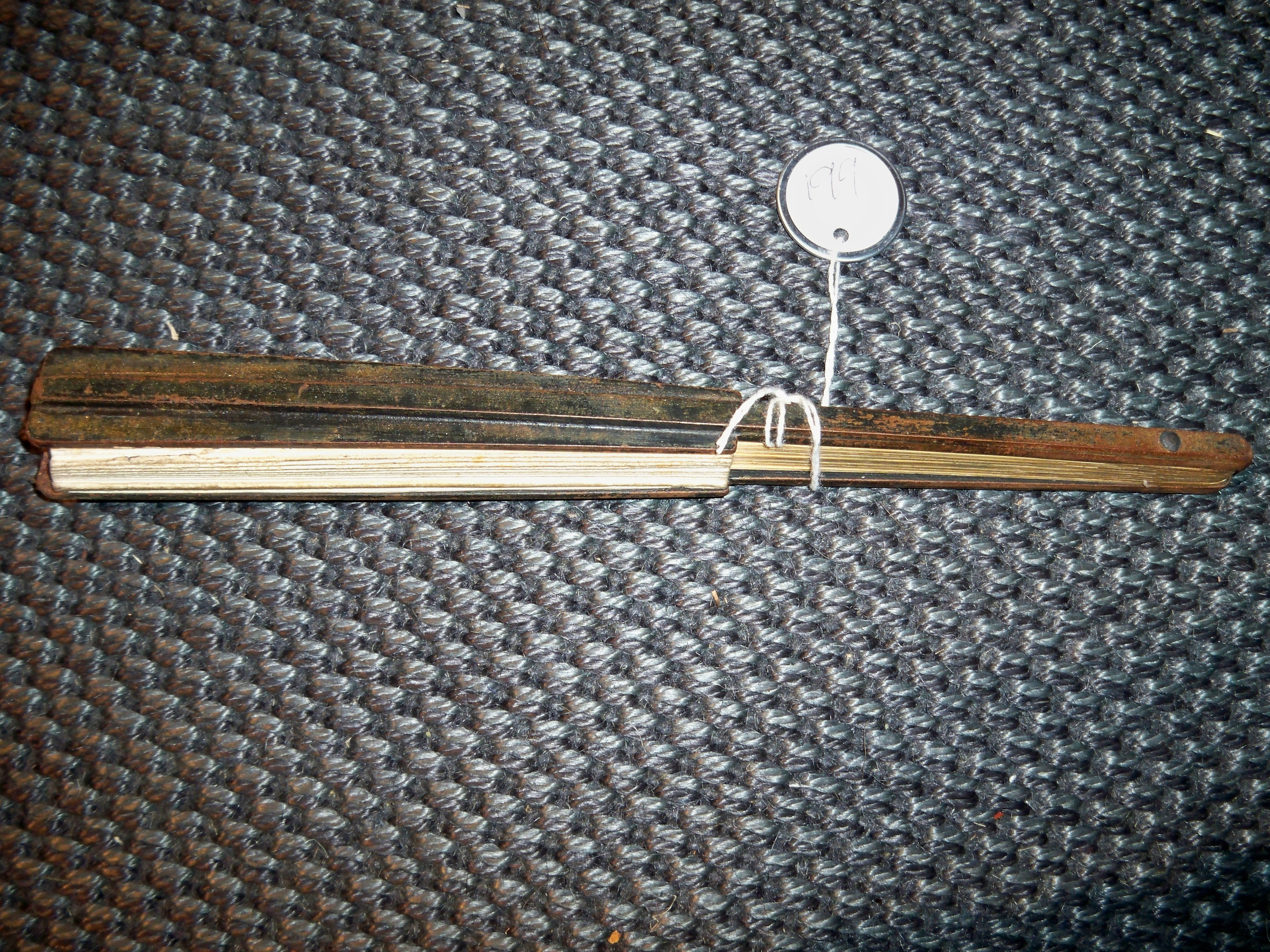
An iron Japanese tessen fan with wood ribs

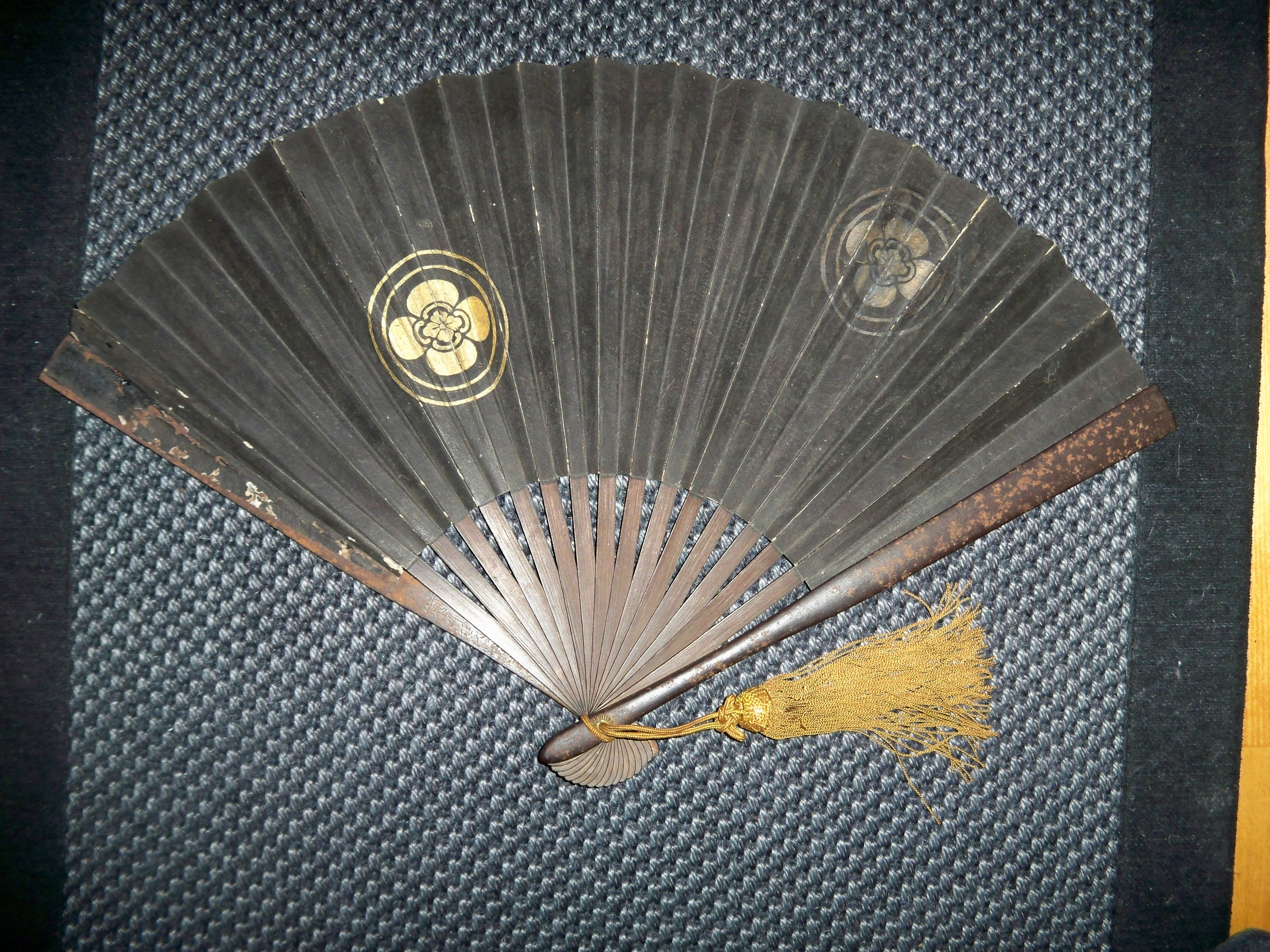
Edo period Japanese (samurai) gunsen fan with wood ribs and an iron outer cover

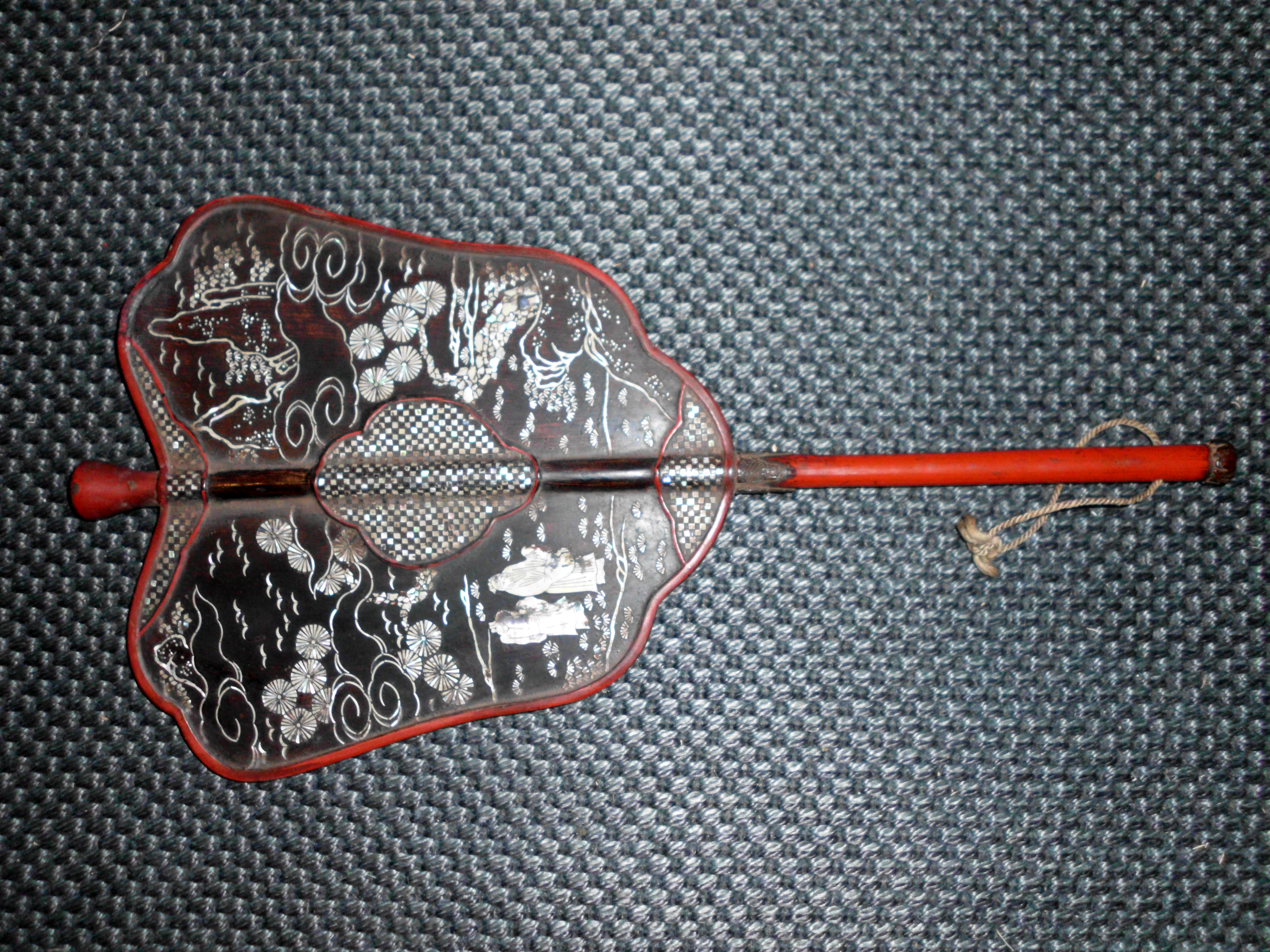
Antique Japanese (samurai) gunbai war fan. Wood and lacquer with shell inlay.

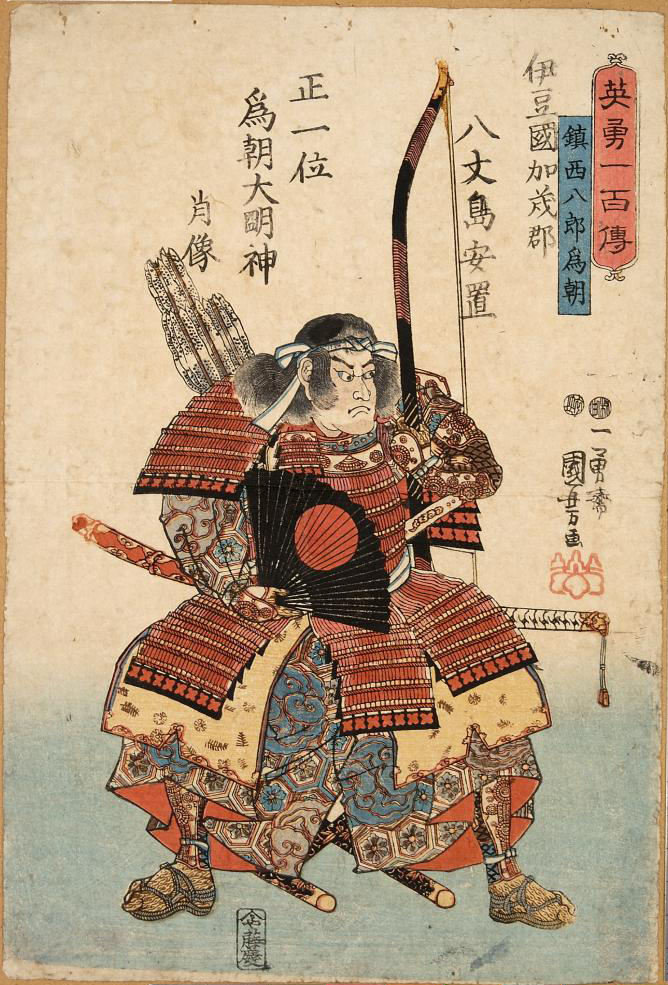
Minamoto no Tametomo with a gunsen fan

== See also ==
- Tessenjutsu
- Minamoto no Yoshitsune

== Sources ==
- Oscar Ratti and Adele Westbrook, Secrets of the Samurai, Edison, NJ: Castle Books (1973).
