= Tadatsugu =

- Gender: Male

Origin
- Origin: Japanese
- Meaning: Different meanings depending on the kanji used

Tadatsugu (written 忠次 or 忠嗣) is a masculine Japanese given name. Notable people with the name include:

- Hajikano Tadatsugu (初鹿野 忠次; 1533–1561), Japanese samurai
- Honda Tadatsugu (本多 忠次; 1547–1612), Japanese samurai
- Ina Tadatsugu (伊奈 忠次; 1550–1610), Japanese samurai
- Konoe Tadatsugu (近衛 忠嗣; 1383–1454), Japanese noble
- Sakai Tadatsugu (酒井 忠次; 1527–1596), Japanese samurai and daimyō
