= Morozumi Torasada =

Japanese samurai

- 両角 虎定
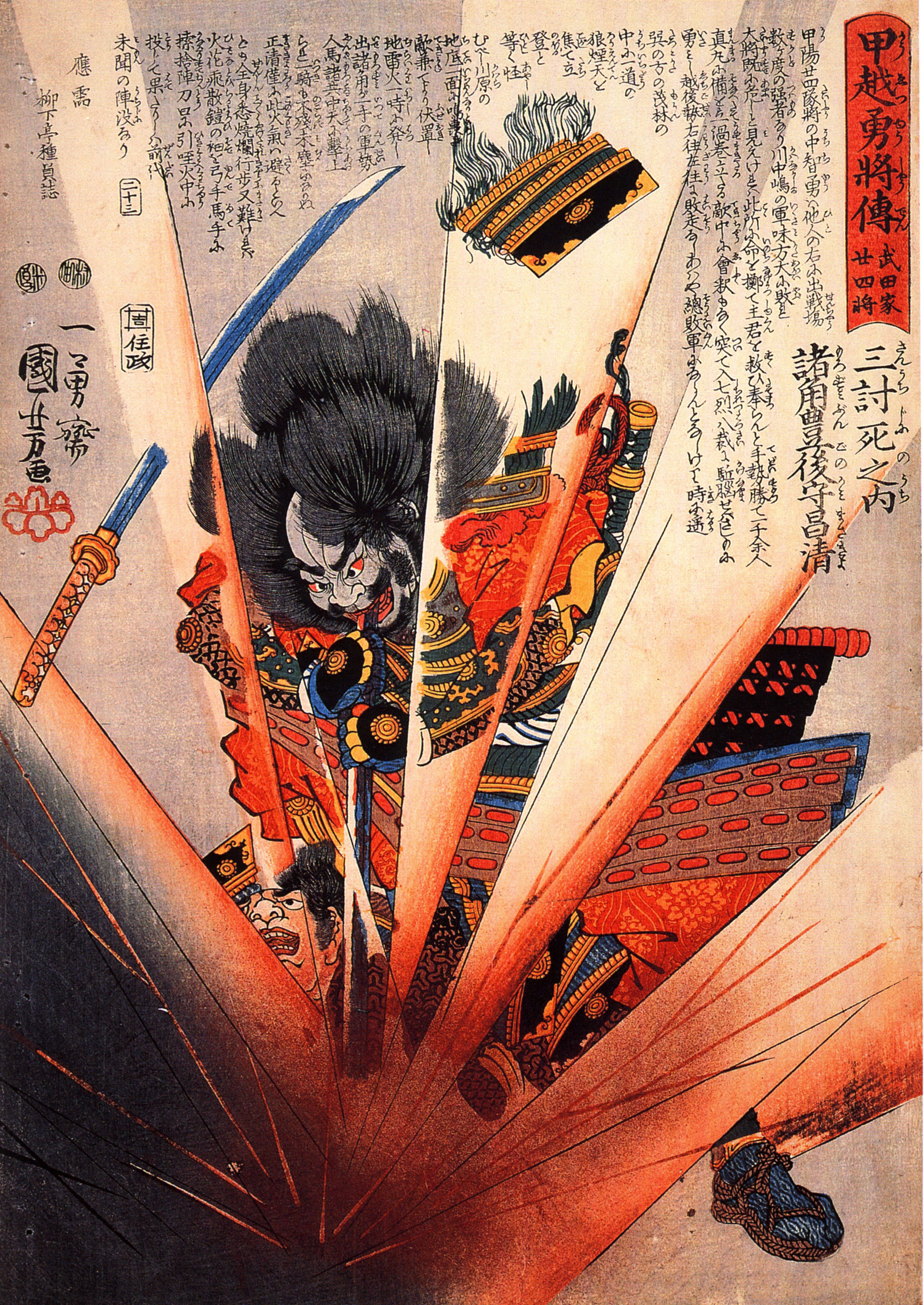
- Born: 1480; Kai Province
- Died: September 10, 1561 (aged 80–81); Battles of Kawanakajima, Shinano Province
- Military career
- Allegiance: Takeda clan
- Rank: Commander
- Nickname: Masakiyo
- Conflicts: Battle of Mikajiri; Shinano campaign Battles of Kawanakajima

Morozumi Torasada (両角 虎定 or 諸角昌清; died 1561) also called Morozumi Bingono Kami Torasada (諸角豊後守) was a Japanese samurai and commander of the Sengoku period. He served the Takeda clan. Morozumi Torasada had served three generations of the Takeda family in many different battles.

In 1561, he participated in the Battle of Kawanakajima, He fought bravely and was killed in the battle between Takeda Shingen and Uesugi Kenshin. It is said that Torasada was 81 years old at the time.

== In fiction ==
- Ten to Chi to (Taiga drama, 1969), played by Kunishirō Hayashi.
- Fūrin Kazan (Taiga drama, 2007), played by Takeshi Katō.
