= Irobe Katsunaga =

Japanese samurai of the Sengoku period

- 色部 勝長
- Born: 1493
- Died: February 7, 1569 (aged 75–76); Murakami Castle, Niigata Prefecture, Japan
- Military career
- Allegiance: Uesugi clan
- Conflicts: 4th Battle of Kawanakajima (1561); Siege of Karasawa (1563)

Irobe Katsunaga (色部 勝長; 1493? – February 7, 1569) was a Japanese samurai of the Sengoku period. A high-ranking retainer of the Uesugi clan. Katsunaga was one of the Kita-Echigo no Kokuninshu (北越後の国人衆; "Countrymen of Northern Echigo"), and was considered one of the most respected men under Uesugi Kenshin.

He saw action at the 4th Battle of Kawanakajima of 1561 and the Siege of Karasawa at Sano, Tochigi in the region of Kōzuke in 1563 among others. For his distinction in battle at Kawanakajima he was granted Hirabayashi Castle.

Katsunaga died when attempting to confront the uprising of Honjō Shigenaga in 1569.

His sons included Irobe Akinaga and Irobe Nagazane.
