= Battles of Kawanakajima =

Clan conflicts in feudal Japan from 1553 to 1564

- Part of the Sengoku period
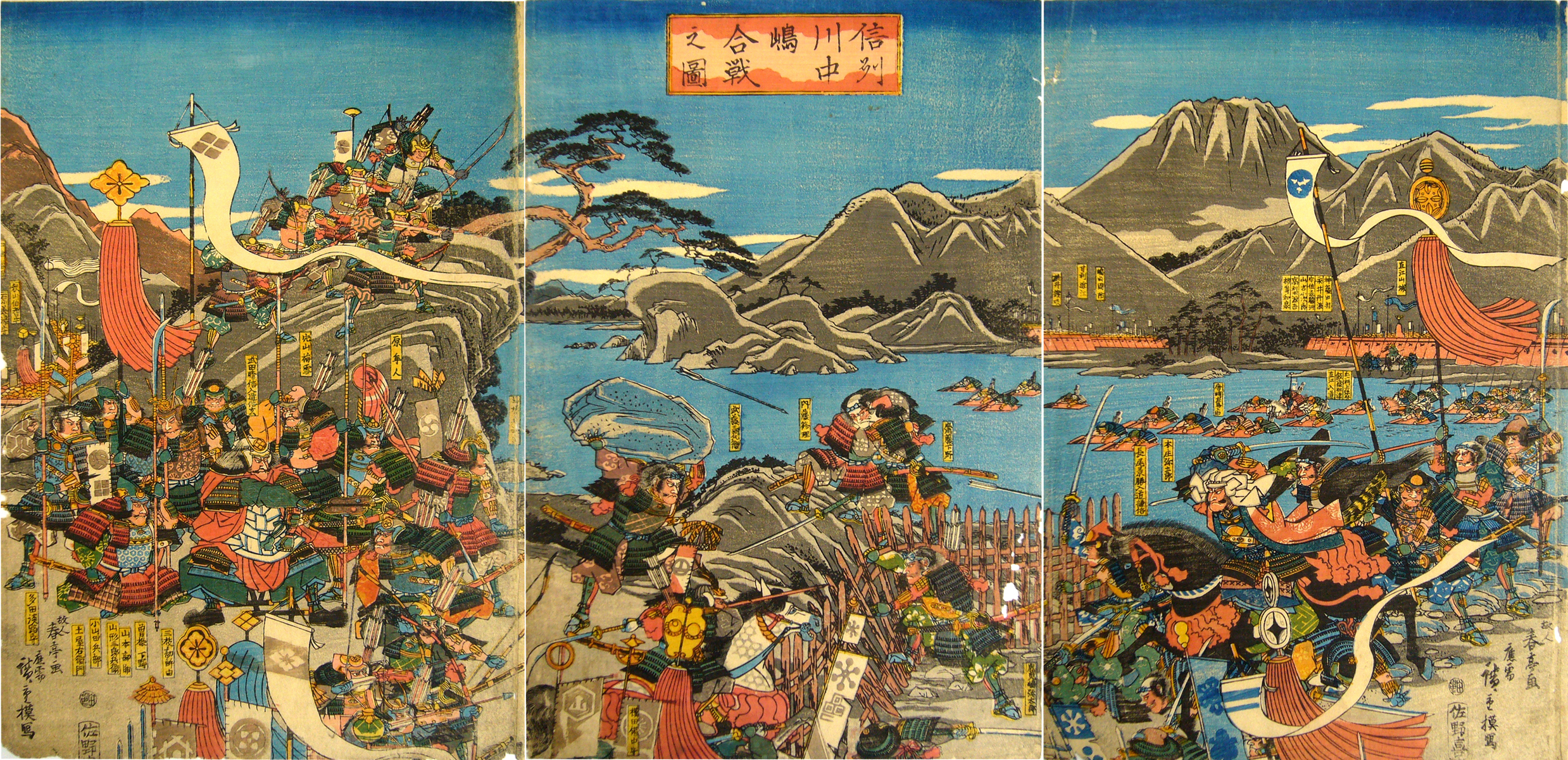
- The Battle of Kawanakajima, Shingen on the left and Kenshin on the right; woodblock print by Utagawa Hiroshige (1845)
Date	1553, 1555, 1557, 1561, 1564
Location	Kawanakajima, Shinano Province, Japan 36.648611°N 138.194722°E
Result	Inconclusive

Belligerents
Takeda clan	Uesugi clan

Commanders and leaders
Takeda Shingen; Takeda Nobushige †; Yamamoto Kansuke †; Anayama Nobutada; Kōsaka Masanobu; Hoshina Masatoshi; Sanada Yukitaka; Sanada Nobutsuna; Hajikano Tadatsugu †; Baba Nobuharu; Morozumi Torasada †	Uesugi Kenshin; Uesugi Kagenobu; Kakizaki Kageie; Amakasu Kagemochi; Irobe Katsunaga; Shibata Naganori; Yasuda Nagahide; Murakami Yoshikiyo; Nagao Fujikage; Takanashi Masayori; Honjō Shigenaga

Strength
4th battle: 20,000	4th battle: 13,000

Casualties and losses
4th battle: 4,000+	4th battle: 3,000+
- Location within Nagano Prefecture Battles of Kawanakajima (Japan)

The Battles of Kawanakajima (川中島の戦い, Kawanakajima no tatakai) were a series of battles fought in the Sengoku period of Japan between Takeda Shingen of Kai Province and Uesugi Kenshin of Echigo Province from 1553 to 1564. Shingen and Kenshin contested each other for control of the plain of Kawanakajima between the Sai River and Chikuma River in northern Shinano Province, located in the present-day city of Nagano. The battles were triggered after Shingen conquered Shinano, expelling Ogasawara Nagatoki and Murakami Yoshikiyo, who subsequently turned to Kenshin for help.

Five major battles of Kawanakajima occurred: Fuse in 1553, Saigawa in 1555, Uenohara in 1557, Hachimanbara in 1561, and Shiozaki in 1564. The most famous and severe battle was fought on 18 October 1561 in the heart of the Kawanakajima plain, thus being known the Battle of Kawanakajima. The battles were ultimately inconclusive and neither Shingen nor Kenshin established their control over the plain of Kawanakajima.

The Battles of Kawanakajima became one of "the most cherished tales in Japanese military history", the epitome of Japanese chivalry and romance, mentioned in epic literature, paintings, woodblock prints, and movies.

== Background ==
The battles were part of the 16th-century Sengoku period, also known as the "Warring States Period", and were little different from other conflicts. After the Ōnin War (1467–77), the Muromachi shōgun's system and taxation had increasingly less control outside the province of the capital in Kyoto, and powerful lords (daimyōs) began to assert themselves. Such lords gained power by usurpation, warfare or marriage—any means that would safeguard their position. It was manifested in yamajiro ("mountain castles"), which overlooked the provinces.

In 1541, Shingen began his conquest of Shinano Province. In 1550, Shingen advanced once again into Shinano and quickly conquered Hayashi Castle, Kiribara and Fukashi Castle by siege. These had been controlled by Ogasawara Nagatoki, who fled to Murakami Yoshikiyo. In October 1550, Shingen began the Sieges of Toishi Castle, from which position he intended to carry out the final attack on the main Murakami castle of Katsurao. However, in November the siege was abandoned and Shingen's army was counterattacked by Murakami, and almost routed. The following year, though, Murakami was forced to leave the castle and the successful Siege of Katsurao (1553) ensued.

== First battle ==
The first battle of Kawanakajima, also known as the "Battle of Fuse", was fought in 1553. Although regarded as the first battle, it is related to the two battles of Hachiman fought in the same year south of the plain.

Twelve days after taking Katsurao Castle, Shingen penetrated far into the Kawanakajima plain along the eastern bank of the Chikumagawa River. Uesugi Kenshin marched up the western bank to support Murakami Yoshikiyo, and the two armies encountered each other at a shrine of Hachiman (place within modern Yashiro) on June 3, 1553. After Takeda withdrew, Uesugi continued his march and laid siege to Katsura, but was unable to capture it.

In September, Takeda returned to crush the remaining Murakami forces around Shioda. Wada was taken on September 8 and Takashima on the 10th. In both cases the entire garrison was put to death as a warning to other Murakami holdouts. Murakami Yoshikiyo retreated from Shioda on 12 September 1553 and about 16 of the clan's outposts in Shinano surrendered to Takeda. Shingen pursued Yoshikyo across the Chikumagawa River but was turned back by Kenshin's reinforcements at the Battle of Fuse. Kenshin pursued Shingen, winning another battle at Hachiman. The victorious Uesugi forces went on to take Arato castle before winter forced both sides to disengage.

== Second battle ==
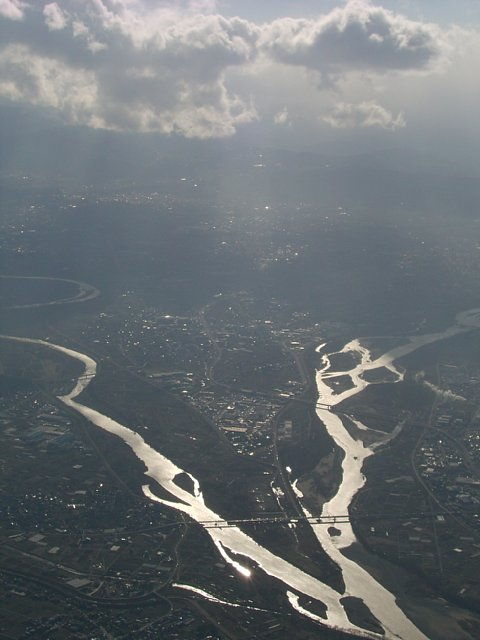
Kawanakajima (center) is where the Sai River (right) joins the Chikuma River (left).

From August to November 1555 the second battle of Kawanakajima, also known as the "Battle of Saigawa", began when Takeda Shingen returned to Kawanakajima, advancing up to the Sai River. He made camp on a hill to the south of the river, while Uesugi Kenshin was camped just east of the Zenkō-ji temple, which provided him an excellent view of the plain. However, the Kurita clan, allies of the Takeda, held Asahiyama fortress a few kilometers to the west; they menaced the Uesugi right flank. Kurita Kakuju's defenses were bolstered by 3,000 Takeda warriors, of whom 800 were archers and 300 arquebusiers.

The main battle was almost shadowed by the number of Kenshin's attacks (siege) against the Asahiyama fortress, but all were repulsed. Eventually he moved his army onto the plain, redirecting his attention to Takeda's main force. However, rather than attacking, both armies waited, for months, for the other to make a move. Finally, battle was avoided as both leaders retired to deal with domestic affairs in their home provinces. The peace was mediated by Imagawa Yoshimoto.

== Third battle ==
The third battle, also known as the "Battle of Uenohara", took place in 1557 when Takeda Shingen captured a fortress called Katsurayama, overlooking the Zenkō-ji temple from the northwest. He then attempted to take Iiyama castle, but withdrew after Uesugi Kenshin led an army out of Zenkō-ji. Of the four, this battle took place furthest from the Kawanakajima plain.

== Fourth battle ==
The fourth battle of Kawanakajima resulted in greater casualties for both sides, as a percentage of total forces, than any other battle in the Sengoku period and is, according to Turnbull, one of the most tactically interesting battles of the period.

After besieging Hōjō Ujiyasu's Odawara castle, Uesugi Kenshin was forced to withdraw after hearing rumors about the movement of Takeda Shingen's army. In September 1561 Kenshin left his Kasugayama Castle with 13,000 warriors, determined to destroy Shingen. He left some of his forces at Zenkō-ji but took up a position on Saijoyama, a mountain to the west of, and looking down upon, Shingen's Kaizu castle. To Kenshin's ignorance, the Kaizu castle contained no more than 150 samurai and their followers and he had taken them completely by surprise. However, the general in command of the castle, Kosaka Masanobu, through a system of signal fires, informed his lord, in Tsutsujigasaki fortress, 130 km away in Kōfu, of Kenshin's move.

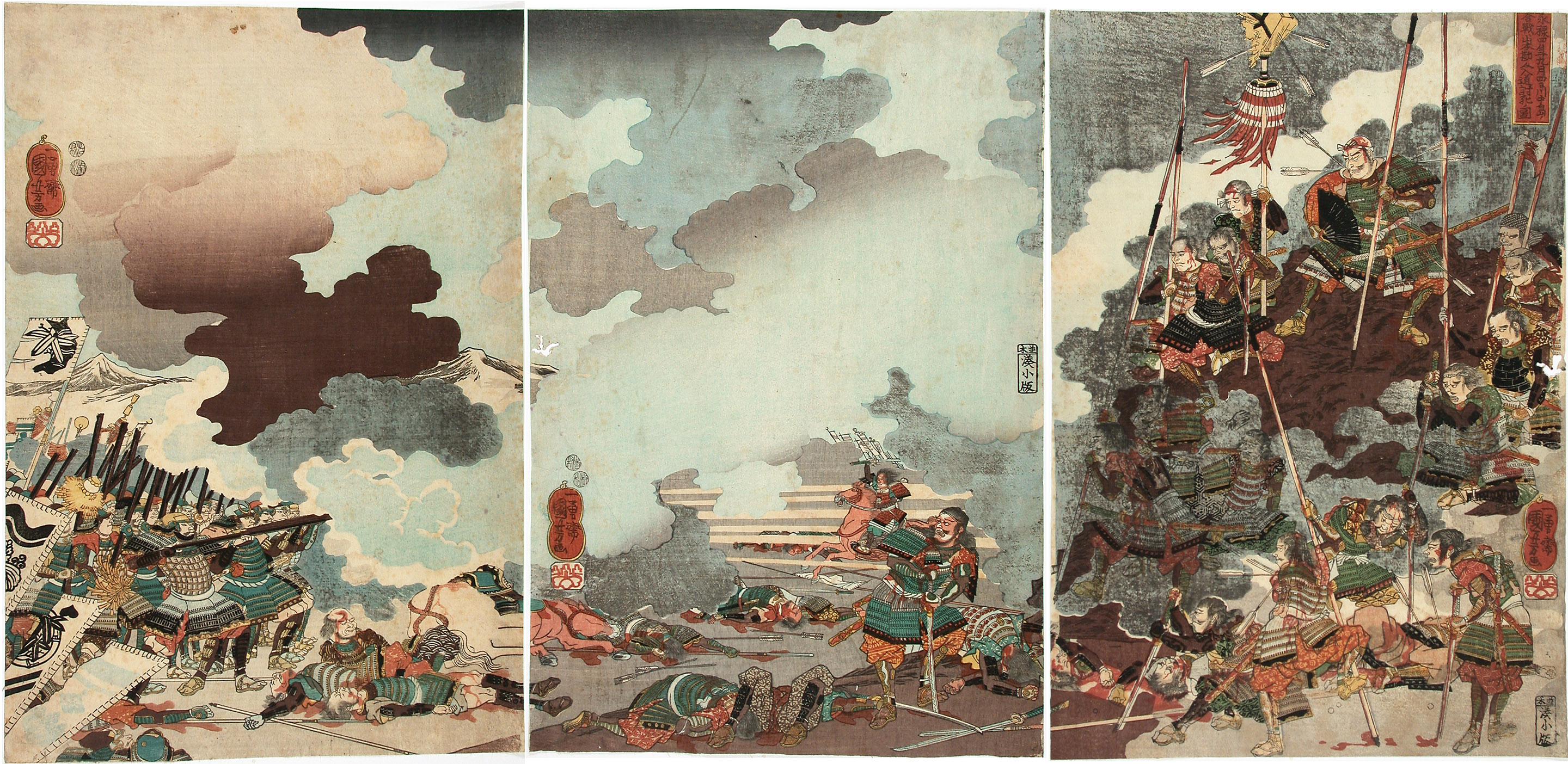
The death of Yamamoto Kansuke, woodblock print by Utagawa Kuniyoshi (1847–48). Wounded and believing his strategy had failed, Kansuke retired to a nearby hill and committed suicide.

Shingen left Kōfu with 16,000 men, acquiring 4,000 more as he traveled through Shinano Province, approaching Kawanakajima on the west bank of the Chikumagawa (Chikuma River), keeping the river between him and Saijoyama. "Neither army made a move", knowing that victory would require the essential element of surprise. Shingen was thus allowed into his fortress at Kaizu along with his gun-bugyō (army commissioner), Yamamoto Kansuke. At that time Kansuke formed a strategy that he believed would prove effective against Kenshin.

Kōsaka Masanobu left Kaizu with 8,000 men, advancing up Saijoyama under cover of night, intending to drive Kenshin's army down to the plain where Takeda Shingen would be waiting with another 8,000 men in kakuyoku ("crane's wing"), formation. However, whether via spies in Kaizu or scouts looking down from Saijoyama, Kenshin guessed Shingen's intentions and led his own men down to the plain. Kenshin descended from Saijoyama by its western flanks. Instead of fleeing Kosaka's dawn attack, Uesugi Kenshin's army crept down the mountain, quietly using bits of cloth to deaden the noise of their horses' hooves. With the beginning of dawn, Shingen's men were surprised to find Kenshin's army ready to charge at them—as opposed to fleeing from the mountain, as expected.

Uesugi's forces attacked in waves, in a kuruma gakari formation, in which every unit is replaced by another as it becomes weary or destroyed. Leading the Uesugi vanguard were two of Uesugi's "Twenty-Eight Generals", Kakizaki Kageie and Irobe Katsunaga. Kakizaki's unit of mounted samurai clashed with Takeda Nobushige's unit, resulting in the death of Nobushige, younger brother of Shingen. While the kakuyoku formation held surprisingly well, the Takeda commanders eventually fell, one by one. Seeing that his pincer plan had failed, Yamamoto Kansuke charged into the enemy ranks, being killed in action with his two chief retainers, Osaragi Shōzaemon and Isahaya Sagorō.

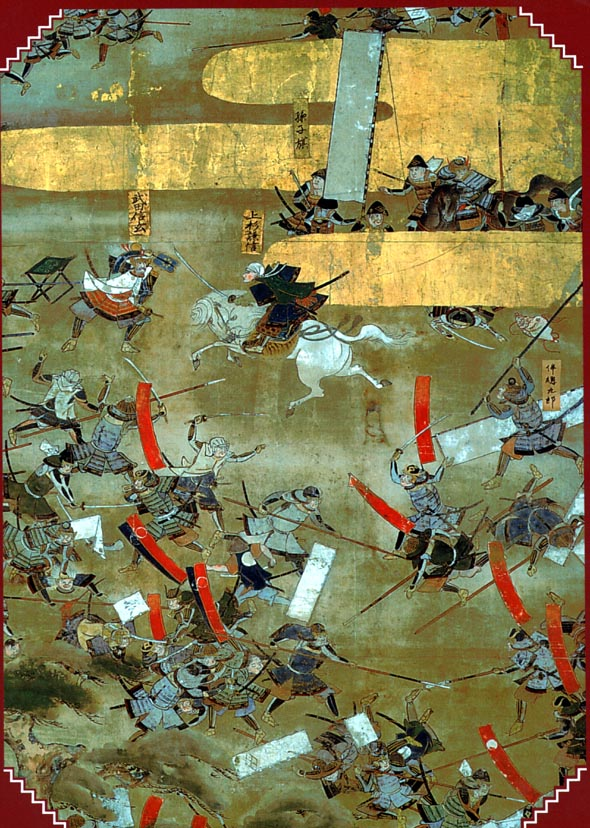
Depiction of the legendary personal conflict between Kenshin and Shingen at the fourth battle of Kawanakajima.

Eventually the Uesugi forces reached the Takeda command post, and one of the most famous single combats in Japanese history ensued. Uesugi Kenshin himself burst into the headquarters, attacking Takeda Shingen who, unprepared for such an event, parried with his signalling fan as best as he could, and held Kenshin off long enough for one of his retainers, Hara Osumi-no-Kami, to spear Kenshin's mount and drive him off.

The Takeda main body held firm, despite fierce rotating attacks by the Uesugi. Obu Saburohei fought back against Kakizaki's samurai. Anayama Nobutada destroyed Shibata Harunaga of Echigo, and forced the Uesugi main force back to the Chikumigawa.

Meanwhile, Kosaka's stealth force reached the top of Saijoyama and, finding the Uesugi position deserted, hurried down the mountain to the fort, taking the same path they had expected the fleeing Uesugi to take. After desperate fighting, they punched their way through the 3000 Uesugi warriors defending the fort (under the command of Uesugi general Amakasu Kagemochi), and pressed on to aid Takeda's main force. The Kosaka force then attacked the retreating Uesugi from the rear. Takeda Shingen's many great generals, including his younger brother Takeda Nobushige and Murozumi Masakiyo, were killed in the field.

=== Result ===
In the end, it is told that the Uesugi army suffered 62% casualties, while the Takeda lost 72%. The chronicles seem to indicate that the Takeda made no effort to stop the Uesugi from retreating after the battle, Uesugi forces burning the encampment at Saijoyama, returning to Zenkō-ji and then to Echigo Province. Some more conservative estimates place the casualties around 20%.

== Fifth battle ==
In September 1564, also known as the "Battle of Shiozaki". Shingen and Kenshin met for the fifth time on the plain of Kawanakajima. Their forces skirmished for 60 days, and then both withdrew.

Another encounter near Lake Nojiri in 1568 could be labeled as the sixth battle, but it is not considered as such.

== In popular culture ==
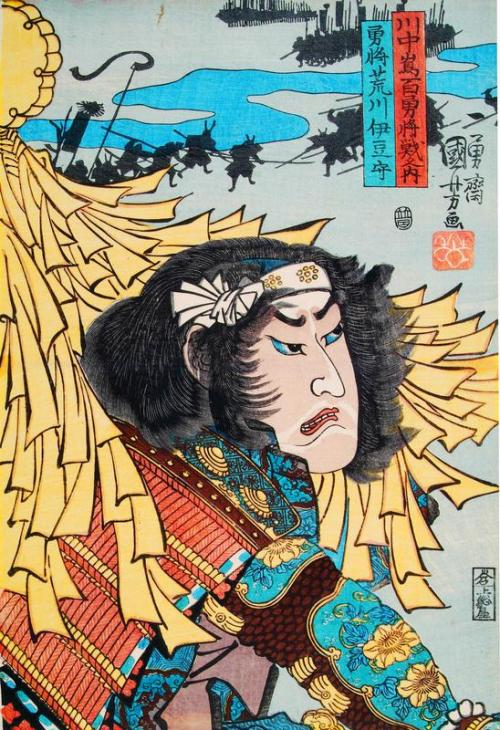
The Kawanakajima Battle by Utagawa Kuniyoshi, 1843-1847

- The Battles of Kawanakajima were a popular subject for woodblock prints in the Edo period, in part because both the Takeda and Uesugi clans had died out and glorification of their deeds did not therefore pose any threat to the ruling Tokugawa shogunate.
- A shogi variant based on xiangqi, Kawanakajima shogi (ja), is named after the battles.
- The 1561 Fourth Battle of Kawanakajima is depicted at the climax of the 1969 Japanese film Fūrin Kazan ('Samurai Banners'), which follows the career of Yamamoto Kansuke.
- A fictionalized version of the battle is featured in the 1979 movie Sengoku Jieitai.
