= Military communication in feudal Japan =

A variety of procedures were used to communicate across the battlefield in feudal Japan, much like in any other culture. These methods included visual signals like flags and banners and audible signals using drums and horns. Messengers on horseback used ciphers and other methods to prevent their messages from falling into the wrong hands. By the beginning of the Sengoku Period, battlefield communications had become fairly complicated affairs, with larger armies than ever before, and a multitude of flags and banners covered in a myriad of colors and designs.

== Flags and banners ==
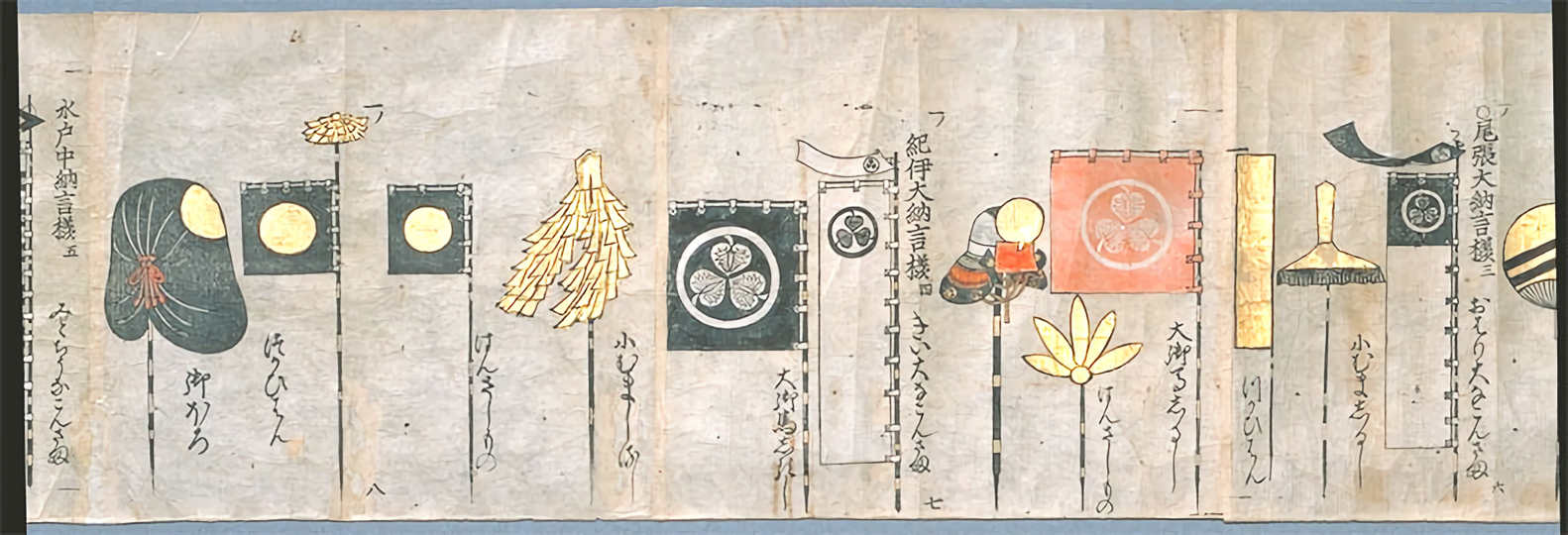
A variety of Uma-Jirushi designs, taken from the 15th-century book O Uma Jirushi. For other pages from this book see the collection of Japanese heraldry images at Wikimedia Commons

Since the beginnings of what we would today recognize as Japanese culture, and probably earlier, various symbols, crests, banners, or markings on armor were used to help identify and distinguish warriors on the battlefield. The mon, or symbol, of a clan or a daimyō was particularly common, identifying which side a warrior fought on; some samurai used their own names or mon rather than that of their lord, while other factions, such as the Ikkō-ikki, could be identified by banners declaring namu amida butsu, praising the name of the Amida Buddha.

By the mid-16th century, flags and banners were seen in greater numbers than ever before, and in an unprecedented variety of styles, sizes, shapes and colors. Where once only higher-ranking samurai and commanders had standards (flags), now lower-ranking warriors wore flags to denote their unit or division, along with their clan or lord. Not only were armies larger than in the past, but the number of clans present on any given side in a battle had increased as well. In any one battle, a single daimyō could have under him several other daimyō, each with a number of units or divisions, and sub-commanders, as well as individual samurai of such a reputation (or wealth) as to warrant their own individual banner. This profusion of banners meant that the commanders, especially the daimyō at the head of each side of the battle, had to have especially large and noticeable standards to identify their location; warriors needed to know where to rally around, whose orders to follow, and what those orders were. The role of standard-bearer was one of the most dangerous, and thus one of the most honorable, positions on the field of battle.

- Sashimono were small rectangular banners worn on the backs of ashigaru, or common soldiers. They typically featured the mon of their daimyō or clan, and used colors to denote units or divisions.

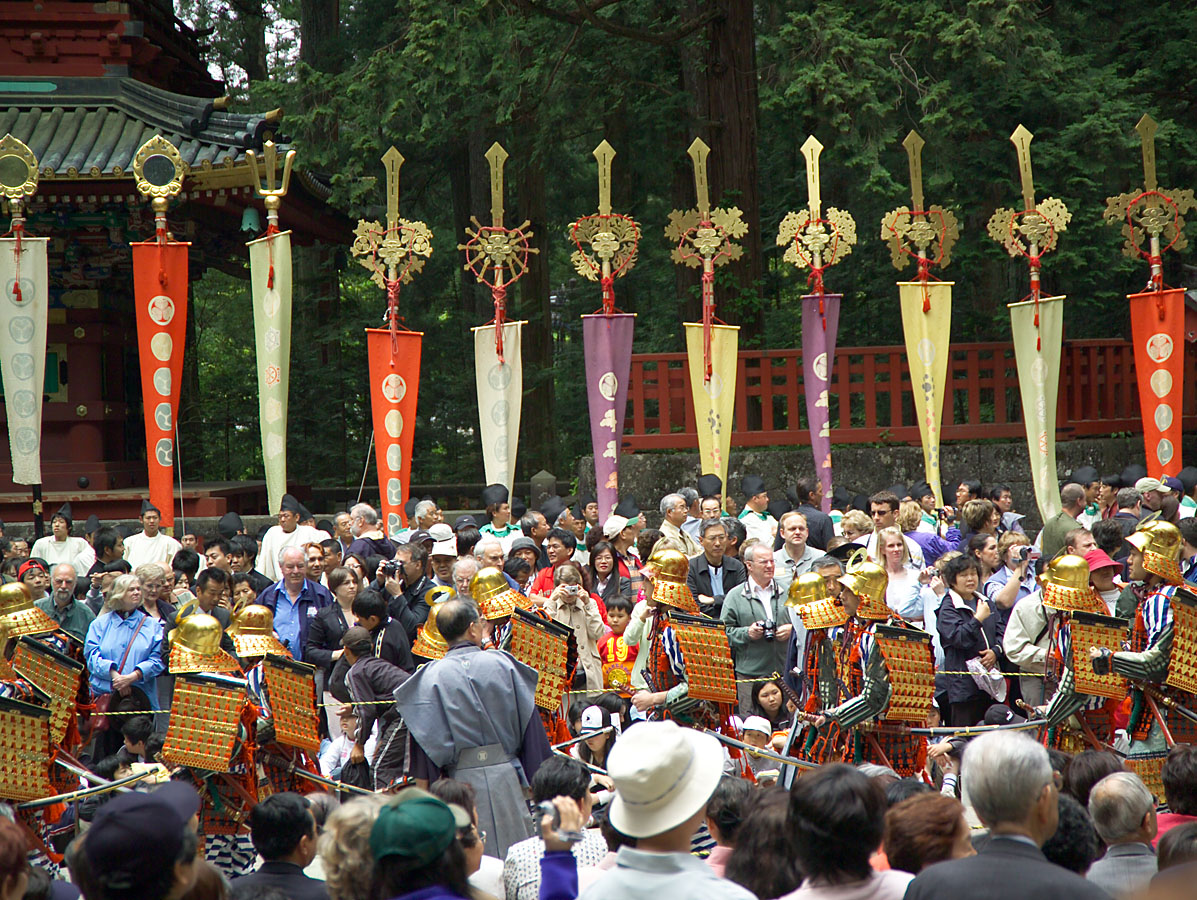
Banners at the Procession of a Thousand Warriors, Nikkō Tōshō-gū

- Jirushi, various flags or banners used as a means of identification. Hata-jirushi were one of the older types of standards; they were long streaming banners attached to a crosspiece and held up on a long bamboo or wooden rod. Uma-jirushi (馬印, lit. horse standard) were the massive, often three-dimensional, banners used to distinguish the daimyō or other top commanders on the battlefield. Sode-jirushi, a badge worn on the shoulder armour, and kasa-jirushi, a badge worn on the helmet, these were used in place of the (more cumbersome) sashimono in night attacks, ambushes, sea fights, and on stormy days. For private soldiers they are used as regimental badges.
- Nobori (幟, lit. flag, banner) are perhaps the most well-known of feudal Japanese military flags. Introduced somewhat later than the hata-jirushi, nobori were stiffened pieces of cloth, attached to a pole through loops, and including, of course, a mon or other identifying mark on it, to represent the samurai or daimyō who carried it.
- The horo (母衣) were large pieces of cloth, not entirely unlike a cape or cloak, which would be worn on the back, supported and shaped by a series of bamboo or wooden sticks. In addition to displaying an identifying mon or symbol, and making the samurai appear larger-than-life, it served the purpose of arrow entangler. Ultimately, it marked that warrior as someone important, usually a messenger or scout, and worthy of honorable treatment, even by his enemies.
- A daimyō would often signal with his war fan "gunbai or gunpai" as well. While these fans were much larger than the usual paper or silk ones, it seems unlikely that orders could be conveyed to thousands or tens of thousands of warriors in this way.
- Saihai were signal batons used by samurai commanders, these were small handheld staffs with strips of leather, lacquered paper or a streamer of animal hair on one end.

== Audible signals ==
Every culture has used drums, horns, or other audible signals to announce the call to battle, to set marching pace, and for a number of other basic commands. Before the age of radios, telephones, and computers, this was more or less the only way to issue orders to a large group of people.

- Taiko are large Japanese drums which, in addition to their military applications, are very common elements in rituals and matsuri (festivals). In war, taiko would be used to rouse the troops, calling them to battle, as well as to summon allies onto the field, to set marching pace, and to encourage troops as they approached victory.
- Horagai were conch shells used as trumpets or horns, to issue orders across the battlefield. A complex system of conch calls came into use by the height of the Sengoku period. Many yamabushi were renowned for their skill with a conch, and were hired into feudal armies as kai yaku, or trumpeters.

Gongs and bells were often used for related purposes, though these were rarely brought onto the battlefield. Rather, they would be kept at camp, and used primarily to rouse the army to battle, and to signal warnings of approaching enemies and the like. It is rumored that in Uesugi Kenshin's war camp, the first bell meant to stop eating, the second to put on armor, and the third to move out onto the battlefield. Much like the Buddhist temple bells used for the same purpose in the Genpei War, later 'war bells' were bronze, and fairly large; they would be struck by a wooden hammer from the outside, not by a clapper on the inside like Western bells.

Other devices, such as wooden clappers (hyoshigi) were sometimes used in urban war camps, or urban skirmishes, to set time and encourage troops. But the range of their sound is quite limited, and thus so was their use on larger battlefields.

== Messages and messengers ==
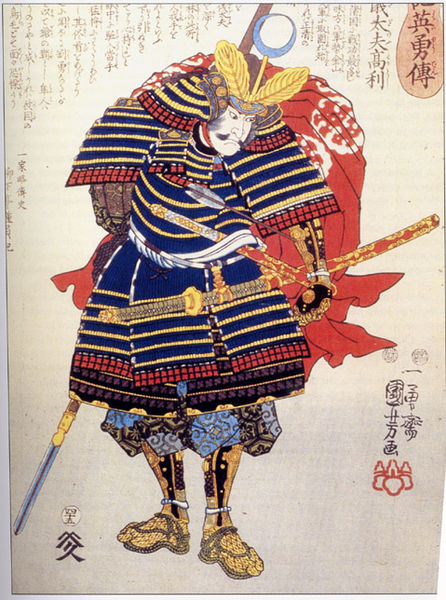
A samurai wearing the horo, or stiffened cloak that helped messengers and bodyguards increase their visibility

Communications were, of course, not only necessary on the battlefield, but between battles as well. Takeda Shingen famously set up a system of fire beacons across his Province of Kai, so that he could be notified in the capital of Kofu as soon as his rival Uesugi Kenshin made a move. Wooden towers were filled with combustible material, and as each was lit, the next, some distance away, would see the signal and light theirs.

Once an army was on the move, scouts were often sent to provide reconnaissance, and messages needed to be transmitted between elements of the same army, or between allies, speedily, and without the information falling into the hands of the enemy. A number of systems of protecting their intelligence, and ensuring its safe delivery came about. Often, written messages would end with 'you will be informed of these things by the messenger.' By not placing the entire message in writing, the messenger could enjoy some degree of protection from those who would kill him and steal the scroll.

Attaching messages to arrows fired over a castle's walls was a common method of communicating with allies under siege. While the message was often simply wrapped around and tied onto the arrow, some used special arrows with hollow shafts specifically designed for this purpose. Whistling-bulb arrows, originally used just before a battle to draw the attention of the kami that they should watch the events about to transpire, were modified to serve as message-carrying arrows.
