= Amakasu Kagemochi =

Japanese samurai

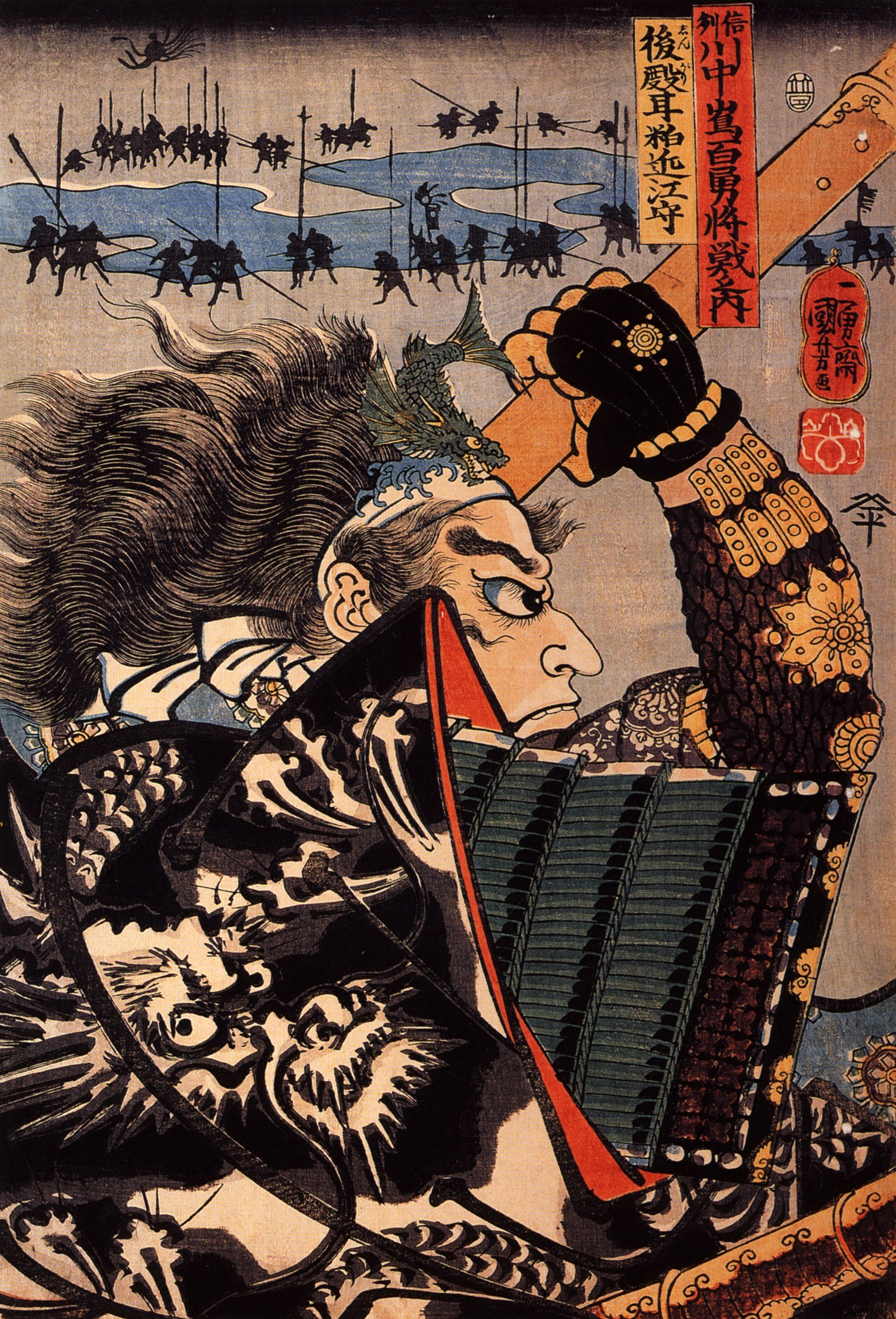
Amakasu Omi no Kami

Amakasu Kagemochi (甘糟 景持) (died 1604) was a Japanese samurai of the Sengoku period. He was a retainer of the Uesugi clan. He was a commander of the Masugata Castle.

Kagemochi distinguished himself in the fighting at the 4th Battle of Kawanakajima. At the battle he commanded the rear guard for the Uesugi and clashed with the famed Takeda warriors, Kosaka Masanobu and Baba Nobufusa. This skirmish took place in what is called Amenomiya.
