= Hajikano Tadatsugu =

Japanese samurai

Hajikano Tadatsugu

Hajikano Tadatsugu (初鹿野 忠次; 1533 – October 18, 1561) was a Japanese samurai of the Sengoku period, who served the Takeda clan as one of Takeda Shingen's 32 retainers.

He was the son of Hajikano Denemon. The Hajikano clan is a branch of the takeda clan found by Takeda Tokihira. He died at the fourth battle of Kawanakajima in 1561 at age 28.
