= Shinagawa Masakazu =

Japanese samurai

Shinagawa Masakazu (品川 将員, 1544 - October 13, 1565) was a Japanese samurai of the Sengoku period, who served the Mōri clan. He was also known as Shinagawa Katsumori (品川 勝盛), Shinagawa Daizen (品川 大膳) and Shinagawa Ōkaminosuke (品川 狼之介).
