= Kakizaki Kageie =

Japanese samurai of the Sengoku period

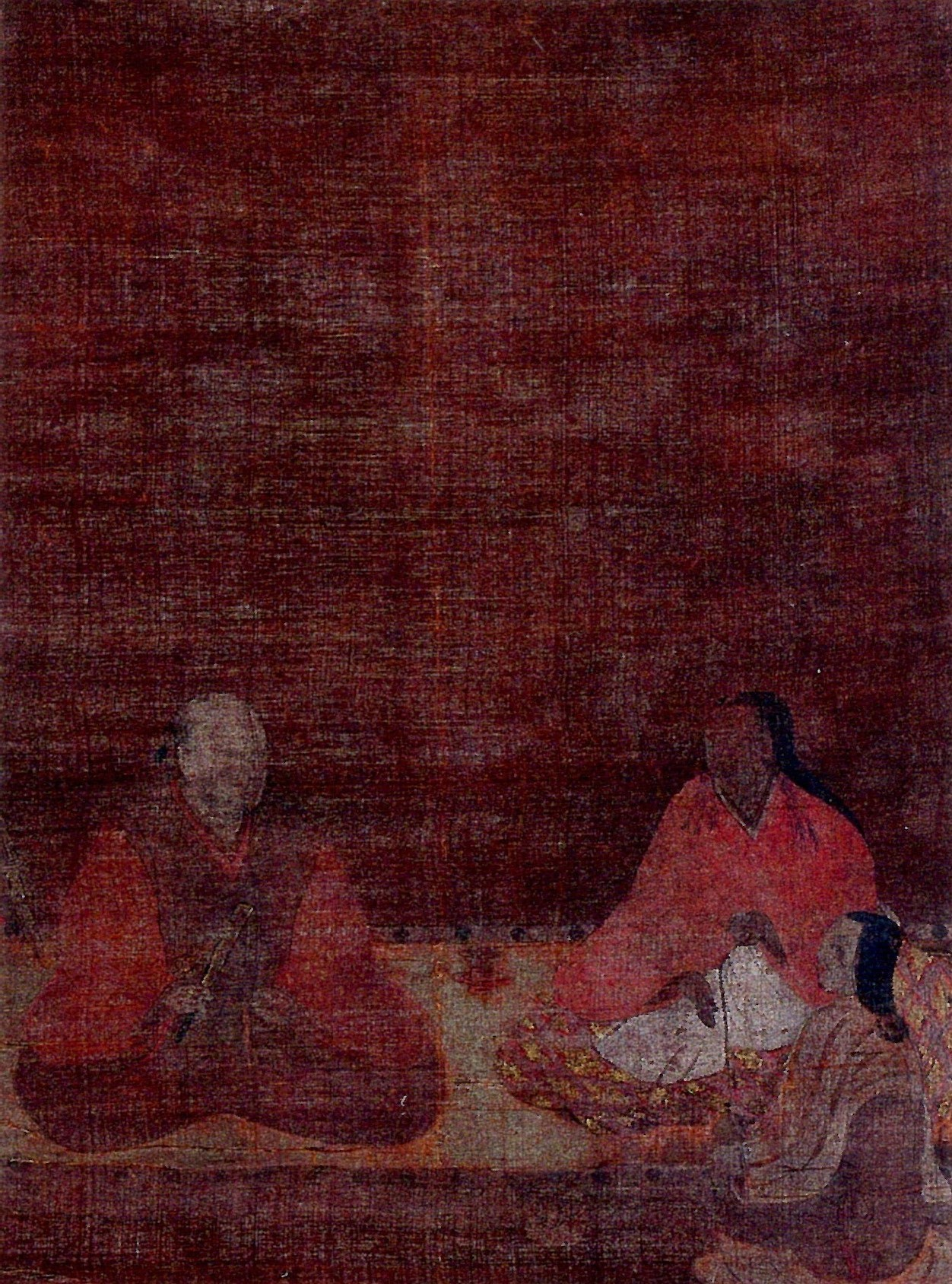
Kakizaki Kageie and his wife

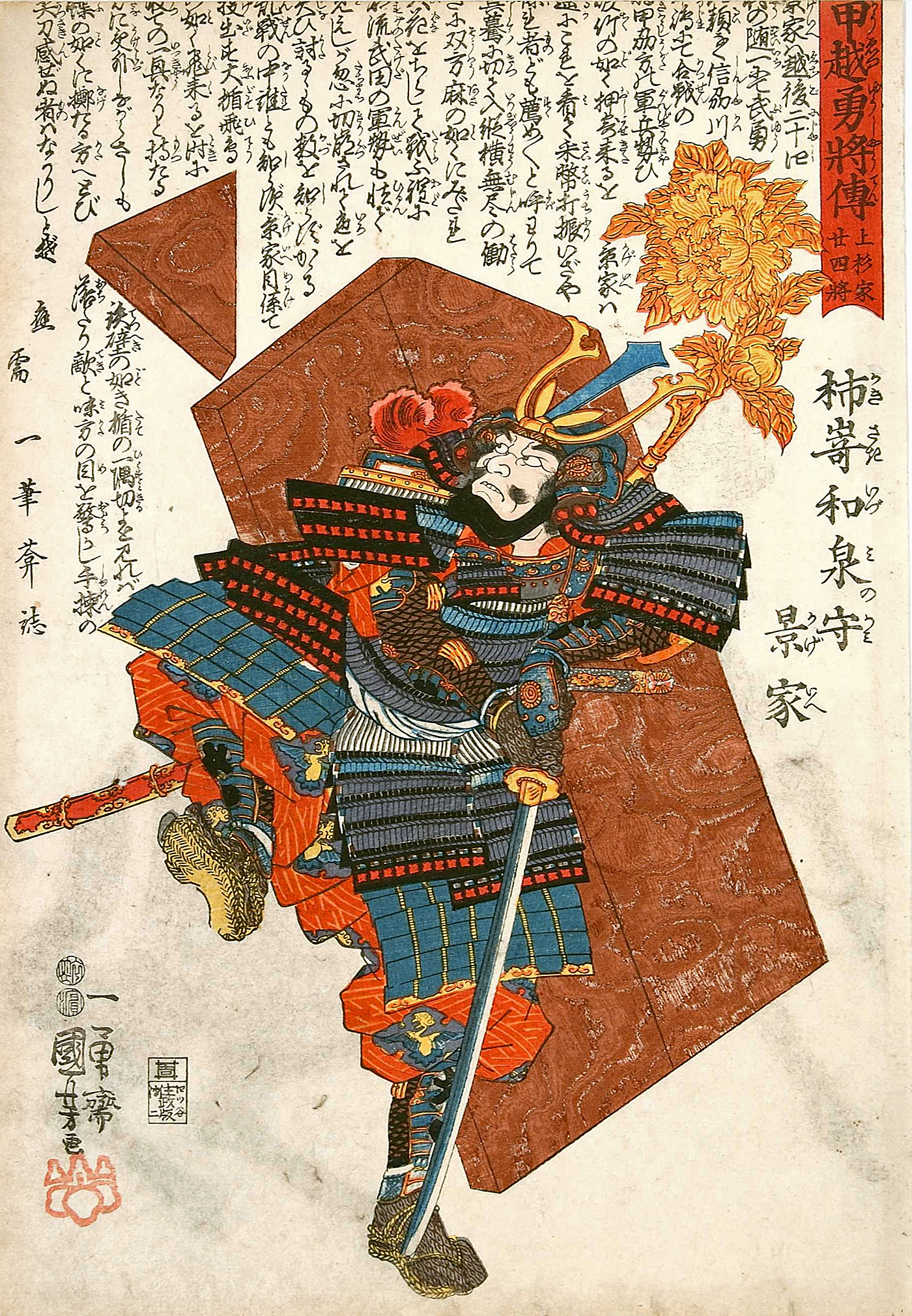
Ukiyo-e of Kakizaki Kageie

Kakizaki Kageie (柿崎景家; 1513? – 1575) was a Japanese samurai of the Sengoku period, who served the Uesugi clan of Echigo Province. He was one of the most prominent and well known generals of Uesugi Kenshin.

As a member of the Echigo Shichiteshu (Echigo Seven Group Commanders), an elite council of seven major military commanders serving under Uesugi, he was known as an extremely ferocious warrior and fierce vanguard commander. He fought at the 3rd battle of the Battles of Kawanakajima against the Takeda clan, and led the vanguard force for the Uesugi at the 4th battle.

Older texts, such as Kagekatsu-ko ichidai ryakki (A Brief Chronicle of Lord Kagekatsu's Life), claim that Kakizaki was suspected of treason or conspiring with the Oda clan against Uesugi and was either ordered to commit seppuku or was executed in 1575. Modern historians view the execution for treason story as an unreliable secondary source that was largely fabricated. At the time of Kakizaki's death in 1575, the Uesugi and Oda clans were not in open conflict, leaving little strategic reason or motive for a sudden act of betrayal. Uesugi Kenshin was also historically known for pardoning generals who had proven to be disloyal. Another key reason is that Kakizaki's heir, Kakizaki Haruie, inherited the clan's leadership and lands without being punished. Historians suggest that the story was created during the Otate no Ran (the Uesugi succession dispute) to tarnish the Kakizaki clan after Haruie sided with Uesugi Kagetora instead of Uesugi Kagekatsu.
