= The Inugami Curse =

Novel by Seishi Yokomizo

- 2020 English release
- Author: Seishi Yokomizo
- Original title: 犬神家の一族 (Inugamike no Ichizoku)
- Language: Japanese
- Series: Kosuke Kindaichi files
- Release number: 1
- Genre: Mystery fiction
- Set in: Nagano
- Publisher: Kadokawa Shoten
- Publication date: 1972
- Publication place: Japan
- Pages: 414

The Inugami Curse is a 1951 Japanese mystery novel by Seishi Yokomizo. It is part of the Kosuke Kindaichi series, which began with the 1946 novel, The Honjin Murders. The Inugami Curse was first published in English as The Inugami Clan by ICG Muse in 2003; this same translation was used for Stone Bridge Press's 2007 edition and Pushkin Vertigo's 2020 edition.

== Plot ==
Private detective Kosuke Kindaichi is summoned to a remote part of Japan by one of the attorneys of a rich businessman who has recently died. The attorney is distraught because he believes that the dead man's will is sure to set off a ferocious battle amongst his heirs, most of whom hate each other. Almost immediately after Kindaichi's arrival the lawyer is murdered, and the detective soon finds himself enmeshed in the family's history of bitterness and deceit as more bodies begin to pile up.

== Adaptations ==
As one of the best known entries in the Kindaichi series, the novel has been adapted numerous times for film, television and stage.

=== 1954 film ===
Entitled The Mystery of the Inugami Family: The Devil Dances. Directed by Kunio Watanabe and starring Chiezō Kataoka.

=== 1970 television adaptation ===
A loose six part television entitled Blue Beasts. The character of Kindaichi is omitted.

=== Ichikawa films ===
Kon Ichikawa directed two films based on the novel: The Inugami Family in 1976, and The Inugamis in 2006. Both films starred Kōji Ishizaka as Kindaichi.

=== 1977 television adaptation ===
Multi-part television adaptation starring Ikko Furuya.

=== 1990 television adaptation ===
Television drama starring Kiichi Nakai.

=== 1994 television adaptation ===
2 hour television drama starring Tsurutaro Kataoka.

=== 2004 television adaptation ===
Episode of the Kosuke Kindaichi television series starring Goro Inagaki.

=== 2018 television adaptation ===
Television drama starring Shigeaki Kato.

=== 2020 television adaptation ===
30 minute episode of the series Kosuke Kindaichi Dances! starring Sosuke Ikematsu.

=== 2023 television adaptation ===
Two-part episode of the series Kosuke Kindaichi starring Hidetaka Yoshioka.

=== Video games ===
The novel was also adapted as a video game made for the Nintendo DS by FromSoftware on January 22, 2009.
