= 7th Yokohama Film Festival =

1986 Japanese film festival edition

- Location: Yokohama Nikkatsu Theatre, Yokohama, Kanagawa, Japan
- Founded: 1980
- Festival date: 9 February 1986

The 7th Yokohama Film Festival (第7回ヨコハマ映画祭) was held on 9 February 1986 in Yokohama Nikkatsu Theatre, Yokohama, Kanagawa, Japan.

== Awards ==
- Best Film: Love Hotel
- Best Actor: Minori Terada – Love Hotel
- Best Actress: Tomoyo Harada – Early Spring Story
- Best New Actress:
  - Noriko Hayami – Love Hotel
  - Yuka Ōnishi – Typhoon Club
- Best Supporting Actor: Tomokazu Miura – Typhoon Club
- Best Supporting Actress: Kie Nakai – Kanashii kibun de joke
- Best Director: Shinji Sōmai – Love Hotel, Typhoon Club
- Best Screenplay: Takashi Ishii – Love Hotel, Muhan
- Best Cinematography: Noboru Shinoda – Love Hotel
- Best Music Score: Shigeru Umebayashi – Sorekara, Let Him Rest in Peace
- Best Independent Film: Keppū Rock
- Special Prize:
  - Mitsuko Baisho (Career)
  - Tatsumi Kumashiro (Career)

== Best 10 ==
1. Love Hotel
2. Typhoon Club
3. W's Tragedy
4. Lonely Heart
5. Early Spring Story
6. Sorekara
7. Let Him Rest in Peace
8. Nuclear Gypsies
9. Minna Agechau
10. Night on the Galactic Railroad

runner-up: You Gotta Chance
runner-up: Fire Festival
