= The Devil's Ballad =

- Theatrical poster
- Directed by: Kon Ichikawa
- Written by: Toru Kuriko
- Based on: Akuma no temari-uta by Seishi Yokomizo
- Produced by: Kon Ichikawa; Osamu Tanaka
- Starring: Kōji Ishizaka; Keiko Kishi; Akiko Nishina; Kōji Kita; Tomisaburō Wakayama; Takeshi Katō
- Cinematography: Kiyoshi Hasegawa
- Music by: Kunihiko Murai
- Production company: Toho Pictures
- Release date: April 2, 1977 (Japan)
- Running time: 143 minutes
- Country: Japan
- Language: Japanese

The Devil's Ballad (Japanese: 魔の手毬唄, Hepburn: Akuma no temari-uta) also known as Lullaby to Kill, The Devil's Bouncing Ball Song, and A Rhyme of Vengeance is a 1977 Japanese film directed by Kon Ichikawa based upon a novel by mystery writer Seishi Yokomizo. The film, the second of six in Ichikawa's "Kindaichi" series, follows the attempts of detective Kosuke Kindaichi to investigate an old murder case in the town of Onikōbemura (鬼首村; lit. "Devil's Neck Village") on the border between Okayama Prefecture and Hyōgo Prefecture.

The box office receipts of the films exceeded 750,000,000 yen. The film was referred to as a "smash hit" (大ヒット) for Toho Pictures and was among the top 10 box office draws of 1977 in Japan. Tomisaburō Wakayama won the Blue Ribbon Award for Best Supporting Actor at the 20th Blue Ribbon Awards for his performance in the film, which he undertook while suffering from complications of diabetes. Meanwhile, Takeshi Katō won the Best Supporting Actor award at the 2nd Hochi Film Awards for reprising his role as Detective Tachibana, a character that formerly appeared in the 1976 film The Inugami Family.

The production of the film was documented extensively by the film magazine Kinema Junpo before its release, including reporting on the set by novelist Chiho Katsura.
