= Yurei otoko =

Ghost Man
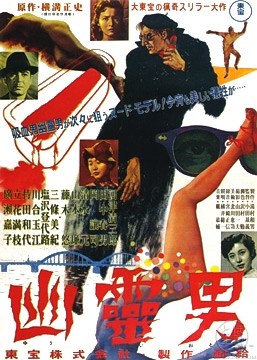
- Japanese poster
- Directed by: Motoyoshi Oda
- Screenplay by: Tsutomuy Sawamura
- Based on: Yurei otoko by Seishi Yokomizo
- Produced by: Kazuo Takimura
- Starring: Seizaburō Kawazu; Haruo Tanaka; Joji Oka; Gen Shimizu
- Cinematography: Kazuo Yamada
- Music by: Kyosuke Kami
- Production company: Toho
- Distributed by: Toho
- Release date: 13 October 1954 (Japan)
- Running time: 72 minutes
- Country: Japan

Yurei otoko (Japanese: 幽霊男; lit. "Ghost Man") is a 1954 film directed by Motoyoshi Oda, and starring Seizaburō Kawazu as Seishi Yokomizo's fictional detective Kindaichi Kōsuke. It is based on Yokomizo's novel of the same name. by It was distributed theatrically by Toho on October 13, 1954.

== Plot ==
According to Multiple movie information sites (Movie Walker, movie.com, KINENOTE listed in the section of external links ) have the same text story. According to it, it is almost true to the original, but there are the following changes.

- The bathtub where Keiko was killed is in the atelier in Nishi-Ogikubo and there is no transfer to the Juraku Hotel.
- Mitsuko was rescued by Kokichi and the authorities, and at this point it turns out that the ghost man and Tsumura are different people.
- Reproduction of the crime warning statement tape and the first harm to Mitsuko was the day after Keiko was killed, the photo session in Izu was several days later, and Mitsuko was killed several days later.
- There is no setting that only the first ghost man was Takebe.
- Finally, Kikuchi (Kikuchi, the original story) jumps and commits suicide by being caught up on the roof by Kanedaichi, who suddenly appeared with a pistol in his hand.

== See also ==
- Vampire Moth
