= Queen Bee (1978 film) =

1978 film directed by Kon Ichikawa

- Theatrical poster
- Directed by: Kon Ichikawa
- Screenplay by: Shinya Hidaka; Chiho Katsura; Kon Ichikawa
- Based on: Jo-o-batchi by Seishi Yokomizo
- Starring: Kōji Ishizaka
- Cinematography: Kiyoshi Hasegawa
- Music by: Shinichi Tanabe
- Distributed by: Toho
- Release date: February 11, 1978 (Japan)
- Running time: 140 minutes
- Country: Japan
- Language: Japanese

Queen Bee (Japanese: 女王蜂, romanized: Jo-o-batchi) is a 1978 Japanese film, directed by Kon Ichikawa. It is based on Seishi Yokomizo's novel of the same title. It is fourth in Kon Ichikawa and Koji Ishizaka`s Kindaichi film series.

== Plot ==
In the Daidoji family of Izu, a man accomplished a mortal death. Kosuke Kindaichi visits the Daidoji family to investigate the case at the request of lawyer Kanoh in Kyoto immediately after the incident.

== Cast ==
- Kōji Ishizaka as Kosuke Kindaichi
- Keiko Kishi as Hediko Kamio
- Takeshi Katō as Detective Todoroki
- Mitsuko Kusabue as Otomi
- Shigeru Kōyama
- Katsuhiko Sasaki as Hitoshi
- Akiji Kobayashi as Detective Kogure
- Ryōko Sakaguchi as Oaki
- Yōko Tsukasa
- Junzaburō Ban as Arashi Sanchō
- Tarō Ishida as Usa Saburō
- Tsuyoshi Sasaki as Komai
- Hideji Ōtaki as Kanō
- Kie Nakai as Tomoko Daidōji
- Masaya Oki as Rentarō Tamon
- Tatsuya Nakadai as Ginzō Daidōji

== See also ==
- The Inugami Family, the first film in Ichikawa and Ishizaka's Kindaichi series.
- Byoinzaka no Kubikukuri no Ie, the fifth film in the series.
