= 47 Ronin (1994 film) =

- Theatrical poster
- Directed by: Kon Ichikawa
- Written by: Kon Ichikawa; Hiroshi Takeyama
- Produced by: Jitsuzo Horiuchi; Toshio Nabeshima; Jun'ichi Shindô
- Starring: Ken Takakura; Kiichi Nakai; Rie Miyazawa; Koichi Iwaki; Ryudo Uzaki; Atsuo Nakamura; Nenji Kobayashi; Kō Nishimura; Kōji Ishizaka; Ruriko Asaoka; Hisaya Morishige
- Cinematography: Yukio Isohata
- Edited by: Chizuko Osada
- Music by: Kensaku Tanikawa
- Distributed by: Toho
- Release date: October 22, 1994 (Japan)
- Running time: 132 minutes
- Country: Japan
- Language: Japanese

47 Ronin (四十七人の刺客, Shijūshichinin no shikaku) is a 1994 Japanese film directed by Kon Ichikawa. The film is another version of the Chūshingura, the story of the revenge of the forty-seven rōnin of Ako against Lord Kira.

== Plot ==
The story of the forty-seven rōnin has been depicted in many ways, with each version focusing the emphasis on different parts of the story: the rivalry of Lords Asano and Kira, Asano's assault on Kira, Asano's sentence of seppuku immediately afterward, and the revenge attack twenty-one months later against Kira by the forty-seven loyal retainers. Oishi Kuranosuke, Asano's chamberlain and the head of the 47 samurai, is often the primary character, and his actions are often held up as the epitome of bushido, the honor code of the samurai.

In this telling, the emphasis is on the preparation for and the attack on Kira's castle. The immediate reactions to Lord Asano's assault on Lord Kira are shown in flashback, and Lord Asano and the actual assault are barely shown at all. Unlike other versions of the story, Oishi does not pretend to descend into a life of debauchery, and Kira is portrayed as knowing of the attack in advance.

== Cast ==
- Ken Takakura ... Ōishi Kuranosuke
- Kiichi Nakai ... Matashirō Irobe
- Koichi Iwaki ... Kazuemon Fuwa
- Ryudo Uzaki ... Yasubei Horibe
- Tatsuo Matsumura ... Yahei Horibe
- Misa Shimizu ... Hori
- Koichi Iwaki ... Fuwa Kazuemon
- Onoe Ushinosuke VI ... Chikara Ōishi
- Atsuo Nakamura ... Hara Sōemon
- Shigeru Kōyama ... Onodera Junai
- Hisashi Igawa ... Okuda Magodayou
- Akiji Kobayashi ... Ōno Kurobei
- Jun Hashizume ... Asano Takuminokami
- Nenji Kobayashi ... Shindo Genshiro
- Kō Nishimura ... Kira Yoshinaka
- Kōji Ishizaka ... Yanagisawa Yoshiyasu
- Ruriko Asaoka ... Riku
- Hisaya Morishige ... Chisaka

== Accolades ==
=== Won ===
- Tokyo International Film Festival 1994:
  - Special Jury Prize: (Kon Ichikawa)
- Hochi Film Awards 1994:
  - Best Supporting Actor: (Kiichi Nakai)
- Asia-Pacific Film Festival 1995:
  - Best Music: (Kensaku Tanikawa)
- Awards of the Japanese Academy 1995:
  - Best Art Direction: (Yoshirō Muraki)
  - Best Editing: (Chizuko Osada)
  - Best Sound: (Tetsuya Ohashi)
  - Best Supporting Actor: (Kiichi Nakai)
- Kinema Junpo Awards 1995:
  - Best Supporting Actor: (Kiichi Nakai)
- Mainichi Film Concours 1995:
  - Readers' Choice Award — Best Film: (Kon Ichikawa)

=== Nominated ===
- Awards of the Japanese Academy 1995:
  - Best Actor: (Ken Takakura)
  - Best Cinematography: (Yukio Isohata)
  - Best Director: (Kon Ichikawa)
  - Best Film
  - Best Lighting: (Kazuo Shimomura)
  - Best Music Score: (Kensaku Tanikawa)
  - Best Screenplay: (Kon Ichikawa, Kaneo Ikegami & Hiroshi Takeyama)
