= The House of Hanging =

1979 film by Kon Ichikawa

- Theatrical poster

Japanese name
- Kanji: 病院坂の首縊りの家
Transcriptions
- Revised Hepburn: Byoinzaka no Kubikukuri no Ie
- Directed by: Kon Ichikawa
- Screenplay by: Kon Ichikawa; Shinya Hidaka
- Based on: Byoinzaka no Kubikukuri no Ie by Seishi Yokomizo
- Starring: Kōji Ishizaka
- Music by: Shinichi Tanabe
- Distributed by: Toho
- Release date: May 26, 1979 (Japan)
- Running time: 139 minutes
- Country: Japan
- Language: Japanese

The House of Hanging (病院坂の首縊りの家, Byoinzaka no kubikukuri no ie), also known as The House of Hanging on Hospital Slope, is a 1979 Japanese film directed by Kon Ichikawa. It is based on Seishi Yokomizo's novel of the same name, and is the fifth film in Kon Ichikawa and Koji Ishizaka's Kindaichi film series.

== Plot ==
Kindaichi Kosuke visits a photo studio to take a photo for his passport. There he happens to meet a daughter who came to request a wedding anniversary photo shoot. Kindaichi and the owner of the photo studio visit a house called Byoinzaka no Kubikukuri no Ie to hand that photo to her.

== Cast ==
- Kōji Ishizaka as Kindaichi Kosuke
- Masao Kusakari as Hinatsu Mokutarō
- Takeshi Katō as Detective Todoriki
- Junko Sakurada as Igarashi Chizuru
- Yoshiko Sakuma as Hogen Yayoi
- Hideji Ōtaki as Kanō
- Akiji Kobayashi as Sannosuke
- Kie Nakai
- Teruhiko Aoi as Yamauchi Toshio
- Mitsuko Kusabue as Amamiya Junko
- Eitaro Ozawa as Honjō Tokubei

== See also ==
- The Inugami Family, the first film in Kon Ichikawa and Kōji Ishizaka's Kindaichi series.
- Queen Bee, the fourth film in Kon Ichikawa and Kōji Ishizaka's Kindaichi series.
