= Takeshi Katō (actor) =

Japanese actor (1929–2015)

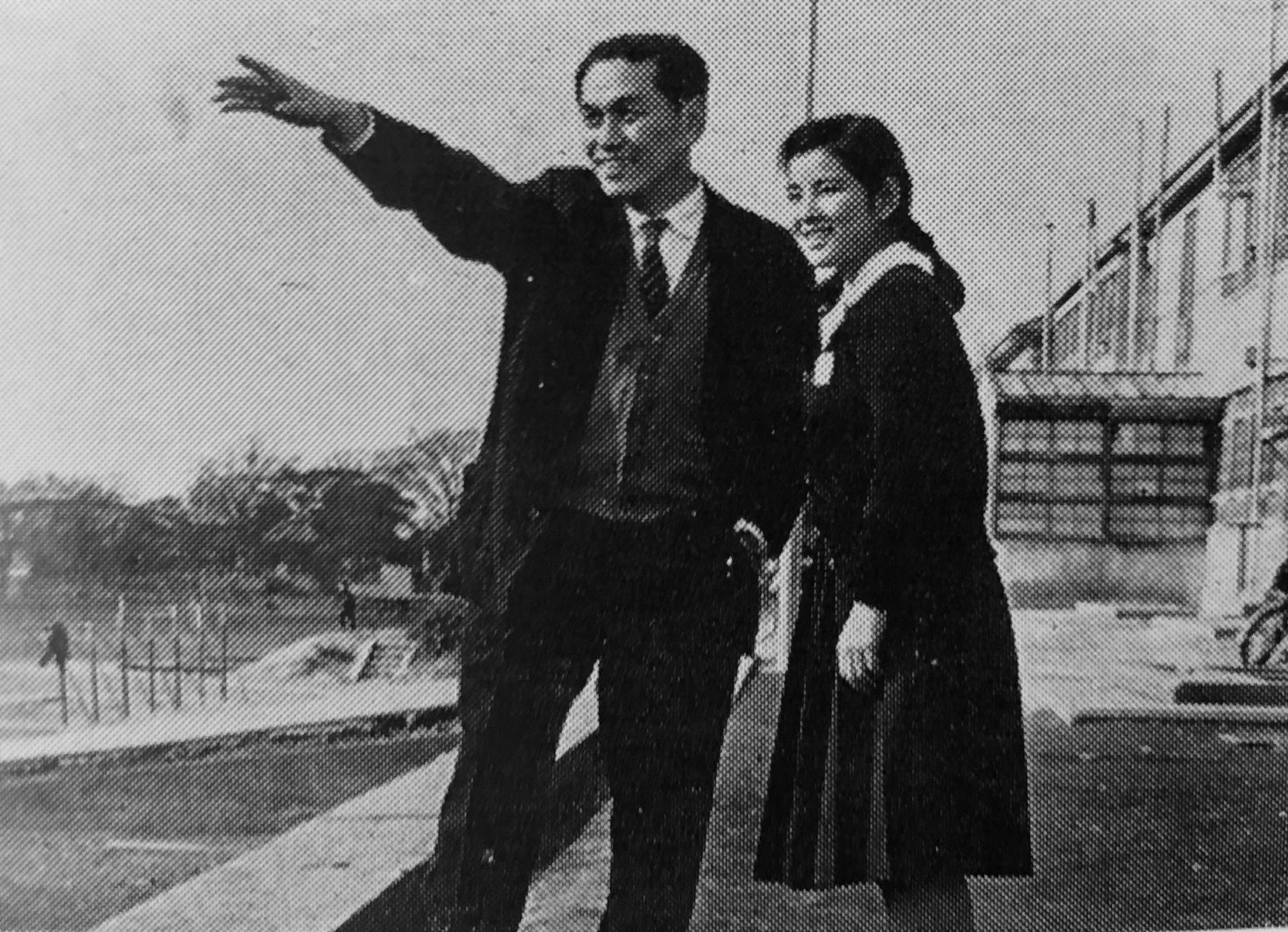
- Born: 24 May 1929; Tokyo, Japan
- Died: 31 July 2015 (aged 86); Tokyo, Japan
- Occupation: Actor
- Years active: 1954–2015

Takeshi Katō (加藤 武, Katō Takeshi; 24 May 1929 – 31 July 2015) was a Japanese stage and film actor. He appeared in more than 100 films.

== Career ==
Graduating from Waseda University, Katō first became a middle school teacher, but then joined the Bungakuza theater troupe in 1952. Beyond appearing in and directing plays on stage, he also appeared in films by such directors as Akira Kurosawa, Shohei Imamura, Kon Ichikawa, and Kiriro Urayama.

He died on 31 July 2015 after collapsing in a sauna.

== Selected filmography ==
=== Films ===
Year	Title	Role	Director	Notes
1953	An Inlet of Muddy Water		Tadashi Imai	Uncredited
1954	Seven Samurai	a samurai	Akira Kurosawa	Uncredited
1957	Throne of Blood	a samurai	Akira Kurosawa	
1957	The Lower Depths	guardhouse official	Akira Kurosawa	Uncredited
1958	The Hidden Fortress	a samurai	Akira Kurosawa	
1960	The Bad Sleep Well	Itakura	Akira Kurosawa	
1961	Pigs and Battleships	Ōhachi	Shohei Imamura	
1961	Yojimbo	Kobuhachi	Akira Kurosawa	
1962	Foundry Town	Noda	Kirio Urayama	
1963	High and Low	Detective Nakao	Akira Kurosawa	
1963	Mother	Toshiro	Kaneto Shindo	
1963	Bushido, Samurai Saga		Tadashi Imai	
1965	None but the Brave	Sgt. Tamura	Frank Sinatra	
1965	Sword of the Beast	Katori	Hideo Gosha	
1968	Japan's Longest Day	Hisatsune Sakomizu	Kihachi Okamoto	
1968	Bonta No Kekkon Ya	Kasamatsu	Koji Chino	
1969	Battle of the Japan Sea	Katō Tomosaburō	Seiji Maruyama	
1970	Fuji sanchō		Tetsutaro Murano	
1972	Summer Soldiers		Hiroshi Teshigahara	
1973	Battles Without Honor and Humanity: Proxy War	Noburo Uchimoto	Kinji Fukasaku	
1974	Battles Without Honor and Humanity: Police Tactics	Noburo Uchimoto	Kinji Fukasaku	
1975	The Gate of Youth	Professor Hayatake Senjo	Kirio Urayama	
1976	The Inugami Family	Tachibana	Kon Ichikawa	
1977	Akuma no temari-uta	Tachibana	Kon Ichikawa	
1978	Queen Bee	Todoroki	Kon Ichikawa	
1978	Ogin-sama	Yakuin Zenso	Kei Kumai	
1978	Hi no Tori	Kamamushi	Kon Ichikawa	
1979	Byoinzaka no Kubikukuri no Ie	Todoroki	Kon Ichikawa	
1981	Kofuku	Kenmochi	Kon Ichikawa	
1985	Ran	Koyata Hatakeyama	Akira Kurosawa	
1987	Princess from the Moon	Fujiwara-no-Ōkuni	Kon Ichikawa	
1989	Shaso	Tani	Toshio Masuda	
1993	Kaettekita Kogarashi Monjirō		Kon Ichikawa	
1999	The Geisha House	Kitayama	Kinji Fukasaku	
2006	The Inugamis	Todoroki	Kon Ichikawa	
2015	Mifune: The Last Samurai	Himself	Steven Okazaki	

=== Television ===
Year	Title	Role	Network	Notes
1963	Hana no Shōgai	Magojirō	NHK	Taiga drama
1964	Akō Rōshi	Horibe Yasubei	NHK	Taiga drama
1966	Minamoto no Yoshitsune	Taira no Kagekiyo	NHK	Taiga drama
1967	San Shimai	Ōmura Masujirō	NHK	Taiga drama
1969	Ten to Chi to	Nagao Toshikage	NHK	Taiga drama
1971	Daichūshingura	Takebe Masanoki	NET	
1979	Kusa Moeru	Ōba Kagechika	NHK	Taiga drama
1985–86	Sanada Taiheiki	Honda Tadakatsu	NHK	
1999	Genroku Ryōran	Shindō Toshishige	NHK	Taiga drama
2007	Fūrin Kazan	Morozumi Torasada	NHK	Taiga drama
2009	Tenchijin	Hokkō Zenshuku	NHK	Taiga drama

Preceded by Ichirō Inui	Bungakuza Representative; 2010–2015	Succeeded by Tōru Emori
