= Kadokawa Daiei Studio =

Film division of the Japanese company the Kadokawa Corporation

Kadokawa Daiei Studio Co., Ltd.
- Native name: 株式会社角川大映スタジオ
- Romanized name: Kabushiki gaisha Kadokawa Daiei Sutajio
- Formerly: Kadokawa Pictures (1975-2002; 2014)
- Type: Subsidiary KK
- Industry: Film
- Predecessor: Kadokawa Pictures; Daiei Film
- Founded: May 21, 1975; 51 years ago
- Founder: Haruki Kadokawa (for Kadokawa Pictures branch)
- Headquarters: 1-8-19 Fujimi, Chiyoda, Tokyo, Japan
- Area served: Worldwide
- Key people: Tsuguhiko Kadokawa (Chairman); Shinichiro Inoue (President and CEO)
- Products: Motion pictures
- Total equity: ¥250 million
- Owner: Kadokawa Corporation
- Parent: Kadokawa Shoten
- Website: kd-st.co.jp

Kadokawa Daiei Studio Co., Ltd., formerly Kadokawa Pictures Inc. (角川映画株式会社, Kadokawa Eiga Kabushiki-gaisha) is the film production and distribution division of the Japanese company the Kadokawa Corporation, which was established through the acquisition of Daiei Film.

== History ==
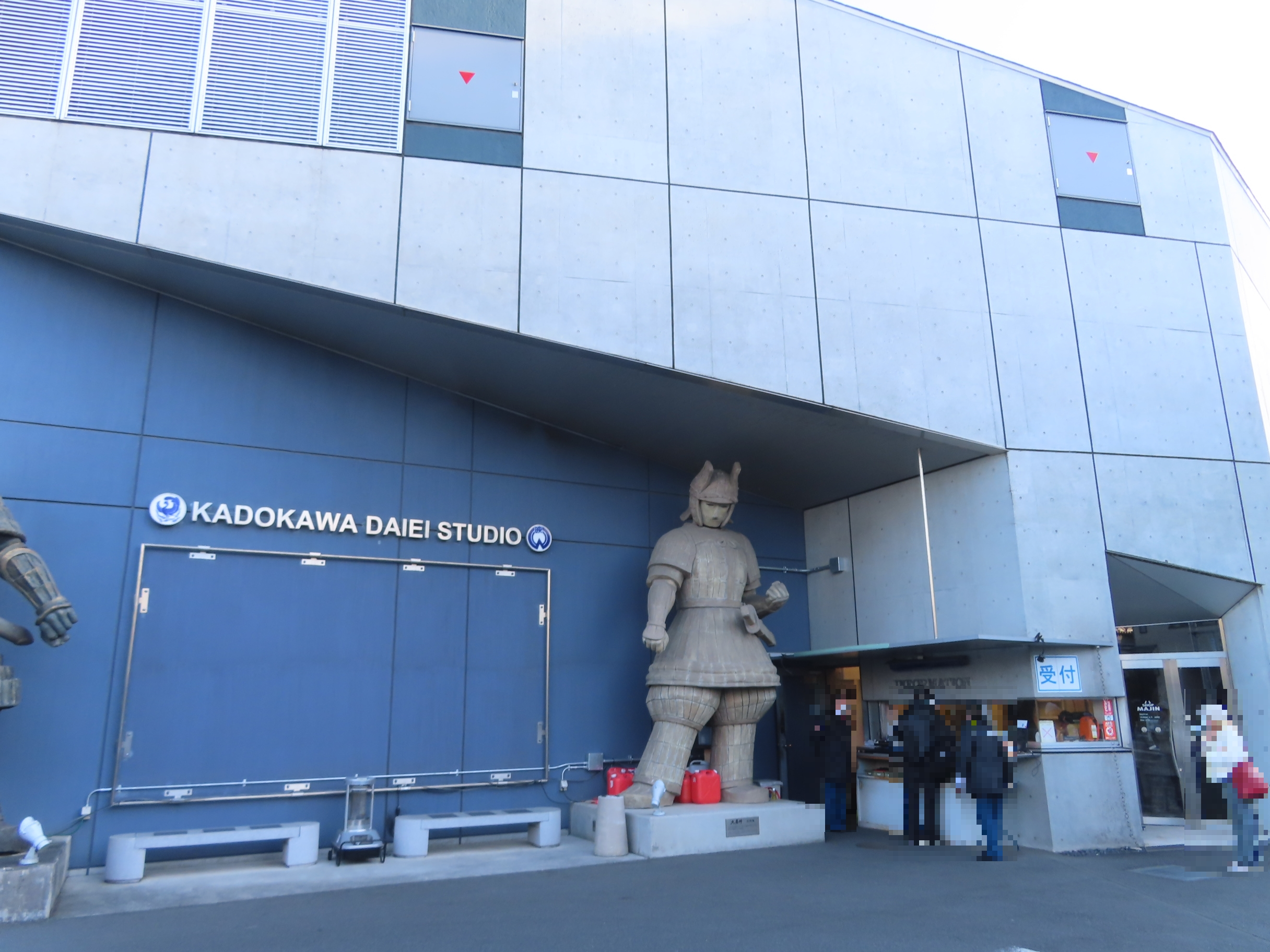
Kadokawa Daiei Studio in Chōfu, which contains the Daimajin Shrine.

Kadokawa Pictures absorbed Daiei Film assets to form Kadokawa Daiei Studio.

In 1945, Genyoshi Kadokawa established Kadokawa Shoten Publishing Co., focusing on the publishing business.

In 1975, Kadokawa's president, Haruki Kadokawa, decided to venture into the film business, launching the film division of Kadokawa Shoten; thus Kadokawa Pictures was born. His goal was to try to reap synergy benefits by creating film adaptations of the publishing house's most popular books and marketing them simultaneously. The company's first film was the 1976 release The Inugamis, directed by Kon Ichikawa and adapted from a Kadokawa Shoten published novel written by Seishi Yokomizo. Due to an aggressive marketing campaign, the film ended as the second-largest earner of the year in Japan.

Between 1976 and 1993, Kadokawa produced close to 60 films. The company's pictures were usually large-scale epics with sizable budgets and matching advertising campaigns, aimed for mass audiences and box-office success. While critics were not always kind on Kadokawa's works, the films were consistently popular among the viewing public. By 1992, seven out of the top 20 all-time highest box-office grossing Japanese films were Kadokawa productions. During his time at Kadokawa Shoten, Haruki Kadokawa was often hailed as the savior of Japan's struggling film industry. Kadokawa's efforts to branch into foreign markets were consistently less successful. Its biggest failure came in 1992, when the 25 million US$ film Ruby Cairo, starring Andie MacDowell, failed to find a distributor in the United States. Haruki Kadokawa was forced to resign from Kadokawa Shoten after being arrested for smuggling cocaine. The new president was Haruki's younger brother Tsuguhiko, who had previously been forced out of the company in favor of Haruki's son Taro.

Kadokawa Shoten later acquired Daiei Film Co. from Tokuma Shoten following the passing of its president, Yasuyoshi Tokuma. In November 2002, the chairman Tsuguhiko Kadokawa announced that Daiei Film Co. would merge with the company's own film division to form Kadokawa-Daiei Film Co., Ltd.

In March 2004, Kadokawa Daiei Pictures, Inc. acquired a 44% stake in Nippon Herald Films Inc., an independent film distributor founded in 1956, and acquired the remaining 56% stake the following year. It later changed its name to Kadokawa Pictures.

On March 1, 2006, it merged with the Kadokawa Herald to become Kadokawa Herald Pictures Inc. and later Kadokawa Pictures. In 2007, it changed its name to Kadokawa Shoten Pictures, with Shinichiro Inoue as its president and CEO.

After a merger with Kadokawa Shoten Publishing Co. in 2011, it became the studio division of its parent company, Kadokawa Group Holdings Ltd. and maintained its name, Kadokawa Pictures, focusing on mixed-media business.

== See also ==
- Toho
- Shintoho
- Tsuburaya Productions
- Daiei Film
- Nikkatsu
- Shochiku
- Toei Company
- Group TAC
