= Death at an Old Mansion =

1975 film

- Theatrical poster
- Directed by: Yoichi Takabayashi
- Written by: Yoichi Takabayashi
- Based on: The Honjin Murders by Seishi Yokomizo
- Produced by: Yoshinobu Nishioka
- Starring: Akira Nakao; Junko Takazawa; Takahiro Tamura; Akira Nitta; Fujio Tokita
- Music by: Nobuhiko Obayashi
- Production company: Art Theatre Guild
- Release date: 27 September 1975 (Japan)
- Country: Japan
- Language: Japanese

Death at an Old Mansion (Japanese: 本陣殺人事件, Hepburn: Honjin satsujin jiken) is a 1975 Japanese horror film directed by Yoichi Takabayashi, based on the mystery novel The Honjin Murders (1946) by Seishi Yokomizo. It was entered into the 26th Berlin International Film Festival.

== Cast ==
- Akira Nakao as Kindaichi Kosuke
- Junko Takazawa as Suzuko Ichiyanagi
- Takahiro Tamura as Kenzou Ichiyanagi
- Akira Nitta as Saburō Ichiyanagi
- Fujio Tokita as the Man With Three Fingers
