= Mitsuko Kusabue =

Japanese actress (born 1933)

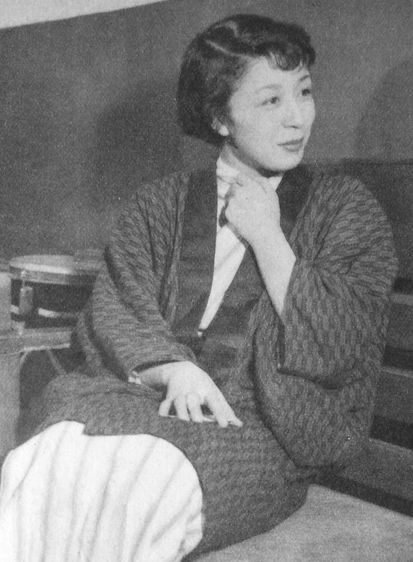
- Born: October 22, 1933 (age 92); Yokohama, Kanagawa, Japan
- Occupation: Actress
- Years active: 1953–present
- Spouse: Yasushi Akutagawa (m. 1960–1962)

Mitsuko Kusabue (草笛 光子, Kusabue Mitsuko; born October 22, 1933 in Yokohama) is a Japanese actress.

== Selected filmography ==
=== Films ===
Year	Title	Role	Notes	Ref.
1957	On Wings of Love	Eiko Itakura		
1958	Song for a Bride	Teruko Nishimura		
1958	A Holiday in Tokyo			
1960	Daughters, Wives and a Mother			
1962	Chūshingura: Hana no Maki, Yuki no Maki	Toda no Tsubone		
1962	A Wanderer's Notebook	Kyōko Hinatsu		
1963	The Lost World of Sinbad			
1964	Yearning	Hisako Morita		
1964	Whirlwind			
1967	Scattered Clouds			
1969	Battle of the Japan Sea			
1976	The Inugami Family	Umeko Inugami		
1977	Akuma no temari-uta			
1978	Queen Bee			
1978	Hi no Tori			
1979	Byoinzaka no Kubikukuri no Ie			
1981	Kofuku			
1984	Wangan Doro	Ikuko Sugimoto		
1985	Sorekara	Umeko Nagai		
1993	Rex: A Dinosaur's Story	Sanae Itō		
2006	The Inugamis	Teacher of Harp		
2006	What the Snow Brings	Shizuko Yazaki		
2009	The Unbroken	Masae Onchi		
2014	0.5 mm	Shizue Makabe		
2016	The Magnificent Nine	Juzaburo's mother		
2018	Walking with My Grandma	Kiyo		
2019	They Say Nothing Stays the Same			
2021	What Happened to Our Nest Egg!?	Yoshino Gotō		
2023	Daisuke Jigen	Chiharu Yaguchi		
2024	90 Years Old – So What?	Aiko Satō	Lead role	
2024	Aimitagai	Komichi		
2025	Let's Meet at Angie's Bar	Angie	Lead role	

=== Television dramas ===
Year	Title	Role	Notes	Ref.
1971	Mayuko Hitori	Miwako Kano	Asadora	
1975	Tsūkai! Kōchiyama Sōshun	Otaki		
1975	Hissatsu Hitchuu Shigotoya Kagyō	Osei	Hissatsu series	
1975	Genroku Taiheiki	Oden no Kata	Taiga drama	
1976	Hissatsu Karakurinin Kepuuhen		Hissatsu series	
1977	Kashin	Nomura Motoni	Taiga drama	
1978	Edo Professional Hissatsu Shōbainin	Osei	Hissatsu series	
1979	Kusa Moeru	Tango no Tsubone	Taiga drama	
1983	Ōoku			
1985	Miotsukushi	Tone Yoshitake	Asadora	
1990	Tobu ga Gotoku	Yura	Taiga drama	
1995	Hachidai Shōgun Yoshimune	Ten'ei-in	Taiga drama	
1997	Aguri	Setsuko Uehara	Asadora	
2000	Aoi	Kōdai-in	Taiga drama	
2002	Toshiie and Matsu	Ōmandokoro	Taiga drama	
2004	Dondo Hare	Katsuno Kagami	Asadora	
2006	Kekkon Dekinai Otoko	Ikuyo Kuwano		
2009	Tenchijin	Tome	Taiga drama	
2010	Second Virgin			
2013	Yae's Sakura	Narrator	Taiga drama	
2015	Mare	Yukie Robert	Asadora	
2016	Sanada Maru	Tori	Taiga drama	
2016	Tokyo Trial	Narrator	Japanese version only	
2018	Bakabon no Papa yori Baka na Papa	Junko		
2021	Old Jack and Rose	Kirako Kuji		
2022	The 13 Lords of the Shogun	Hiki no Ama	Taiga drama	

=== Theater ===
Year	Title	Role	Notes	Ref.
1964	How to Succeed in Business Without Really Trying	Rosemary Pilkington		
1983	Chicago	Roxie Hart		
1993	La Cage aux Folles	Jacqueline		

=== Anime ===
Year	Title	Role	Notes	Ref.
2004	Agatha Christie's Great Detectives Poirot and Marple	Mrs. Opalsen		
2005	The Snow Queen	Amanda		

=== Dubbing ===
Title	Role	Notes	Ref.
Agatha Christie's Marple Series 2	Miss Marple (Geraldine McEwan)		
Agatha Christie's Marple Series 3	Miss Marple (Geraldine McEwan)		

== Honours ==
- Medal with Purple Ribbon (1999)
- Order of the Rising Sun, 4th Class, Gold Rays with Rosette (2005)
- Kinuyo Tanaka Award (2006)
- Japan Academy Film Prize: Distinguished Service Award (2022)
- Person of Cultural Merit (2024)
