= Bonta No Kekkon Ya =

- Directed by: Koji Chino
- Produced by: Nikkatsu
- Release date: 1968
- Running time: 94 minutes
- Country: Japan
- Language: Japanese

Bonta no Kekkon Ya (ぼん太の結婚屋) is a 1968 Japanese comedy film directed by Kōji Chino. Its English title is The Wedding Salesman. The director of photography was Junnosuke Oguri. The film was scored by Naozumi Yamamoto.

== Cast ==
- Bonta Tokyo
- Chieko Matsubara
- Sanae Kitabayashi
- Ichirō Zaitsu
- Shirō Ōsaka
- Takeshi Katō
- Daizaburo Kirata
- Hitoshi Ishii
- Zenpei Saga
- Masao Murata
- Toru Yuri
- Bontaro Taira
