= The Kon Ichikawa Story =

The Kon Ichikawa Story (市川崑物語)
- Film poster
- Directed by: Shunji Iwai
- Written by: Shunji Iwai
- Produced by: Takashige Ichise
- Starring: Kon Ichikawa
- Edited by: Shunji Iwai
- Music by: Shunji Iwai
- Distributed by: Xanadeux; Rockwell Eyes
- Release date: December 9, 2006 (Japan)
- Running time: 83 minutes
- Language: Japanese

The Kon Ichikawa Story (Japanese: 市川崑物語, Hepburn: Ichikawa Kon Monogatari), also known as A Filmful Life, is a 2006 documentary directed by Japanese director Shunji Iwai about the life of iconic and prolific Japanese director Kon Ichikawa. The documentary also devotes time to Natto Wada, Ichikawa's wife, who wrote many of his screenplays.

It was filmed during production of Ichikawa's 2006 film The Inugamis (Japanese: 犬神家の一族, Hepburn: Inugamike no Ichizoku), a remake of his 1976 film of the same name, which would prove to be the director's final film.

A DVD (with English subtitles) was released in Japan on June 29, 2007. Ichikawa died the following year at the age of 92.
