= The Water Was So Clear =

1973 film

- Film poster
- Directed by: Yoichi Takabayashi
- Written by: Matsui Tomohiko
- Produced by: Takabayashi Yoichi Production
- Starring: Yûtarô Ban; Akira Nitta; Kanae Kobayashi; Satchie Matsuda
- Release date: 14 April 1973 (Japan)
- Running time: 93 minutes
- Country: Japan
- Language: Japanese

The Water Was So Clear (Japanese: 餓鬼草紙, Hepburn: Gaki zôshi) is a 1973 Japanese drama film directed by Yoichi Takabayashi. It was released in Japan on April 14, 1973. It was chosen to be shown at Critics' Week at the 1973 Cannes Film Festival and won the grand prize at the 1973 Mannheim-Heidelberg International Filmfestival.

== Plot ==
The Water Was So Clear develops its plot dispensing with dialogue, except for the monk's prayers. The soundtrack is full of the sounds of nature (heavy rain, thunder) and of the household chores, in the sequences set in the monastery; and urban traffic and modern music in the scenes set in the city. The sexual moans of the girl spark the torment of the priest's soul.

On a rainy day a homeless girl is rescued by a Buddhist priest. An extreme close-up of the barrel of a shotgun, perhaps announcing the death of the priest, triggers the city scenes. One day a young man follows her into the monastery grounds and rapes her. They become lovers. The priest sees them on the beach first, and then making love in her room, and becomes a sexually aroused tortured soul. After masturbation, his semen falls on the head of a Buddha statue. The couple leaves, the priest dies, and the old caretaker closes the monastery gates.

This plot is narrated through elegant camera movements and the contraposition of the contemplative life in the monastery and the crowded and noisy activities of the city.

== Reception ==
The Water Was So Clear was given a positive review in Variety.

== Title ==
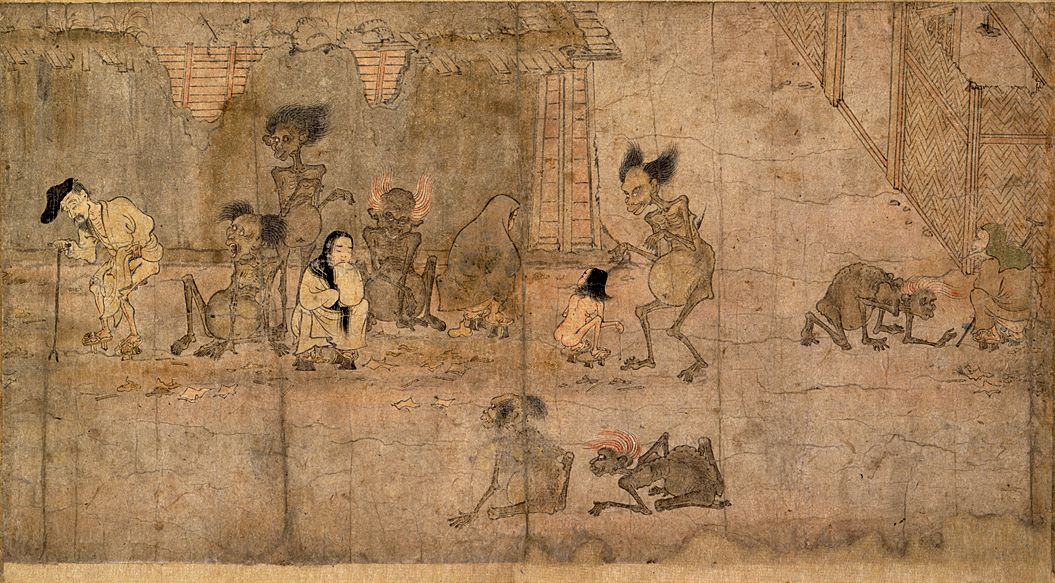
The Gaki zôshi narrative scroll.

The original title, Gaki zôshi (Tales of Hungry Ghosts), comes from a narrative scroll, produced in the late Heian period (794–1185) and kept at the Tokyo National Museum, which depicts spirits condemned to eternal hunger and thirst, referred to as hungry ghosts.
