= The Invisible Avenger =

1954 film by Motoyoshi Oda

Tōmei Ningen (The Invisible Man)
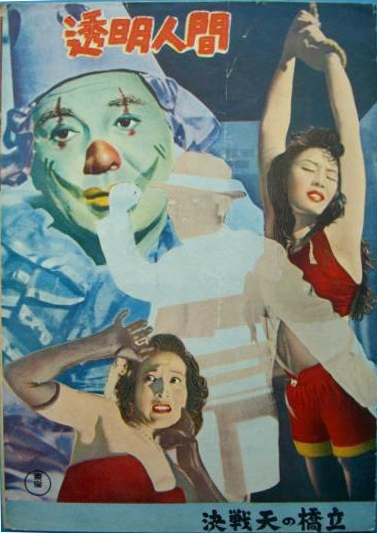
- 1954 Japanese film poster
- Directed by: Motoyoshi Oda
- Screenplay by: Shigeaki Hidaka
- Based on: The Invisible Man suggested by 1897 novel by H. G. Wells
- Produced by: Takeo Kita
- Starring: Seizaburo Kawazu; Miki Sanjo; Minoru Takada; Yoshio Tsuchiya
- Cinematography: Eiji Tsuburaya
- Edited by: Shuichi Orihara
- Music by: Kyosuke Kami
- Production company: Toho
- Distributed by: Toho
- Release date: December 29, 1954 (Japan)
- Running time: 70 minutes
- Country: Japan
- Language: Japanese

The Invisible Avenger (透明人間, Tōmei Ningen; lit. The Invisible Man) is a 1954 Japanese science fiction film directed by Motoyoshi Oda, with special effects and cinematography by Eiji Tsuburaya. The film is a loose adaptation of the 1897 H. G. Wells story The Invisible Man.

== Plot ==
In Ginza, the dead body of an invisible man is discovered, alongside a suicide note. The note reveals that there is at least one other invisible man still alive. An ex-army commander reveals that during the war, Dr. Nishizaki discovered by chance a particle that, when properly utilized, turns any object invisible. At the end of the Pacific War, a special attack corps made up of invisible men crashed on Saipan Island, and were presumed dead, however, two survived. The effects of the invisibility particle cannot be undone.

Soon, there are robberies across Tokyo from a gang calling themselves the Invisible Men. Meanwhile Nanjo, a clown who works at the cabaret Kurofune befriends a young blind girl, Mariko, who lives in the same apartment. Komatsu, a newspaper reporter who witnessed the death of the invisible man, is investigating the phenomenon and spots Nanjo while visiting a robbed jewelry store. In a fake deal to gather money to cure Mariko's blindness, her grandfather is killed by the gang that has been terrorizing the town.

Soon after, Komatsu, who has been following Nanjo, finds himself alone in a room with him and discovers that Nanjo is, in fact, the other invisible man. He dresses as a clown with face makeup, gloves and so on so as to appear visible and lead a relatively normal life. Nanjo and Komatsu decide to work together to investigate and reveal the identity of the gang that is terrorizing the town and who murdered Mariko's grandfather, while also trying to save Michiyo, a singer who is stuck within the gang and cannot escape. They discover that the gang is led by the same people who own Kurofune, and in an ensuing battle and chase, Nanjo, using his invisibility to his advantage, saves Michiyo and kills Yajima, the gang boss. However, he is also fatally wounded in the fight and becomes visible again. He asks Michiyo to take good care of Mariko in his last breath.

== Cast ==
- Seizaburo Kawazu as Takemitsu Nanjo, the clown/Invisible Man
- Miki Sanjo as Michiyo, the singer
- Minoru Takada as Yajima, the leader of the "Invisible Gang"
- Yoshio Tsuchiya as Komatsu, the reporter
- Keiko Kondo as Mariko, the blind girl
- Kenjiro Uemura as Ken
- Kamatari Fujiwara as Mari's grandfather
- Sonosuke Sawamura as Nomura, Deitman
- Seijiro Onda as Chief of Police
- Shoichi Hirose as Policeman
- Takuzo Kumagai as Otsuka
- Shin Otomo as Detective
- Noriko Shigeyama as Nightclub Dancer
- Haruo Suzuki as Men at Nightclub
- Akira Sera as Man at street stand
- Yutaka Oka as Announcer
- Yasuhisa Tsutsumi as Jewelry Shop Manager
- Jiro Kumagai as Otsuka
- Minoru Ito as Man in car (traffic accident)
- Keiko Mori as Woman in car (traffic accident)
- Haruo Nakajima as Invisible Man Akita

== Production ==
=== Filming ===
Tōmei Ningen was shot in black-and-white at academy ratio. The special effects were directed by Eiji Tsuburaya. Tōmei Ningen was a primary influence on Toho's Mutant Series, a trilogy of science-fiction films produced from 1958 to 1960 (The H-Man, The Secret of the Telegian and The Human Vapor).

=== Special effects ===
The scene where Nanjo scrubs off his clown makeup, revealing his invisibility was achieved with Kawazu gradually covering his face with black greasepaint; when combined with a separately photographed background, the dark shades became see-through, and the actor seemed to wipe away his very being.

For scenes where Nanjo throws things or moves the around, piano wire was used to simulate the invisible man holding these objects.

== Release ==
Tōmei Ningen was released in Japan by Toho on December 29, 1954. Any release of the film in the United States is undetermined. No evidence exists that it was ever dubbed in English.

Daiei Film produced two similar films featuring invisibility, The Invisible Man Appears in 1949, and The Invisible Man vs. The Human Fly in 1957.

== Reception ==
David Kalat noted that Tsuburaya's special effects in the film were "clever but sparingly used."
