= Thway =

- Directed by: Koji Chino
- Written by: Journal Gyaw Ma Ma Lay
- Release date: December 8, 2003
- Running time: 201 mins
- Country: Myanmar
- Language: Myanmar
- Budget: 2.6 million US dollar

Thway (Burmese: သွေး) is a 2003 film and the first Japan/Myanmar collaboration. It was directed by Koji Chino. The film is based on a bestselling novel, Thway, written by Journal Gyaw Ma Ma Lay. The Burmese name of the movie is Thway. The English name is The Bonds of Blood and the Japanese name is Chi no Kizuna.

== Cast ==
- Kyaw Thu
- Akari Asou as Yumi Yoshida
- Min Maw Kun as Maung Maung
- Myo Thanda Tun as Ma Thwe Thwe (Maung Maung's mother)
- Toshiyuki Nagashima as Toshio Yoshida

== Plot ==
Yumi is a university student who learns that she has a younger brother (Maung Maung) in Myanmar, who was born to her Japanese father Toshio Yoshida and a Myanmar woman, Ma Thwe Thwe. Toshio was a Japanese soldier sent to Myanmar during World War II. Yumi decides to visit Myanmar to meet her younger brother Maung Maung. Despite many difficulties, she finally meets Maung Maung. The beautiful but sad affection between Yumi and Maung Maung is described in the film.

== Release ==
This film employs both Japanese and Burmese languages with Burmese subtitles. It appeared at Thamada Cinema, Yangon on 24 May 2006. Director Koji Chino attended the debut of the film in Tokyo on 8 December 2003 and in Kyoto, Osaka and other cities. The Japanese debut was crowded with Japanese World War II veterans. He screened the movie in Mandalay on 30 and 31 May 2006.
