= Kanashii kibun de joke =

- DVD cover
- Directed by: Masaharu Segawa
- Written by: Takeshi Yoshida
- Starring: Takeshi Kitano; Kie Nakai; Shingo Yanagisawa; Saburo Ishikura; Midori Kiuchi
- Cinematography: Noritaka Sakamoto
- Edited by: Kazuo Ota
- Music by: Taku Izumi
- Distributed by: Shochiku-Fuji Company
- Release date: April 27, 1985 (Japan)
- Running time: 108 minutes
- Country: Japan
- Language: Japanese

Kanashii kibun de joke (Japanese: 哀しい気分でジョーク), also known as Joke with a Sorrowful Heart, is a 1985 Japanese drama film directed by Masaharu Segawa. The film was written by Takeshi Yoshida and stars Takeshi Kitano in the lead role, alongside Kie Nakai, Naoko Otani and Taichiro Kawabe. It follows a recently-divorced man whose son is dying of a brain tumor. Shochiku released Kanashii kibun de joke on April 27, 1985, in Japan. The film's self-titled theme song was performed by Kitano.

== Premise ==
Popular TV personality Hiroshi Igarashi (Takeshi Kitano) is a divorcé whose wife has abandoned him. He lives with his only son, Ken (Taichiro Kawabe). One day, Hiroshi learns that Ken has a brain tumor and doesn't have much time left to live. He cuts back on work to spend more time with his son. After desperately searching, Hiroshi locates a brain surgeon who can operate on his son. However, he is told that the chances of the surgery being successful are slim. At a loss, Hiroshi enlists the help of those around him and heads to Australia with Ken, where his ex-wife lives.

== Cast ==
- Takeshi Kitano as Hiroshi Igarashi
- Kie Nakai as Yuko Komiya
- Naoko Otani as Mie Akino
- Taichiro Kawabe as Ken Igarashi
- Shingo Yanagisawa as Zenpei Tani
- Saburo Ishikura as Rokusuke Sagawa
- Midori Kiuchi as Riyoko
- Paul Maki as Comedian
- Kin Sugai as Primary School Teacher
- Hiromitsu Suzuki as Host of a Quiz Show
- Midori Utsumi as Hostess of a Quiz Show

== Production ==
The film was shot on location in Sydney, Australia in the fall of 1984.

== Awards and nominations ==
Kie Nakai won the Award for Best Supporting Actress at the 7th Yokohama Film Festival for her performance in the film.
