= Yoichi Hayashi =

Japanese actor

Yoichi hayashi
- 林 与一
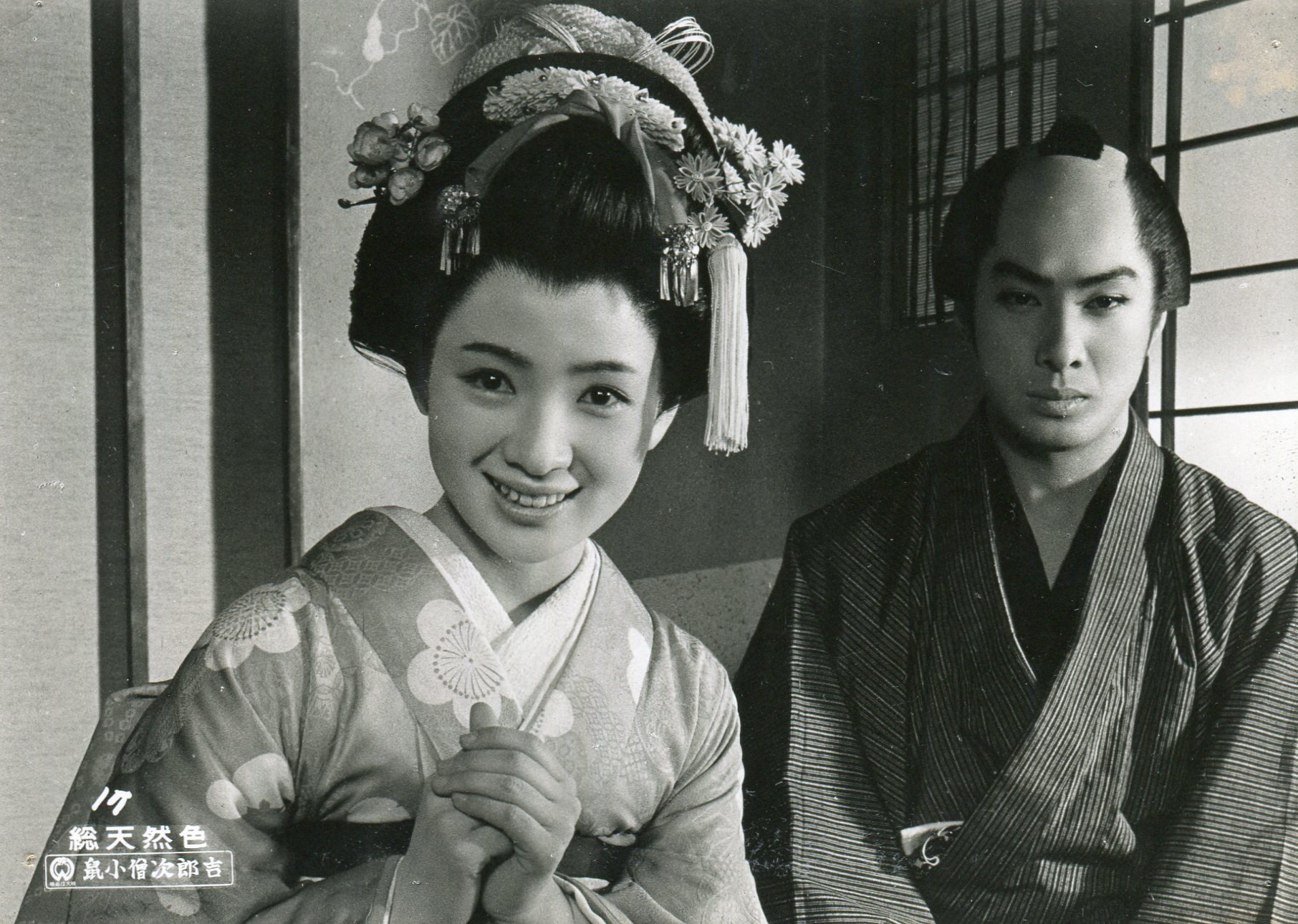
- Yoichi hayashi (right) with Michiko Sugata in "Nezumi Kozo Jirokichi" (1965)
- Born: 14 February 1942 (age 84); Osaka, Japan
- Occupation: Actor
- Years active: 1957–present
- Spouse: Tomoko Ogawa (m. 1977; div. 1987)

Yoichi Hayashi (Japanese: 林 与一, Hepburn: Hayashi Yoichi; born 14 February 1942) is a Japanese actor. Hayashi is a former Kabuki actor, and appeared in many jidaigeki television dramas.

== Early life ==
Born into a large and renowned Kabuki acting family from the Kansai region (more precisely Osaka and Kyoto), his father was Toshio Hayashi, a well-known kabuki actor and film actor (known for starring in films in the jidaigeki genre) and his mother was Reiko Kitami, a film actress with an extensive list of roles in cinema and in different genres. He is also the great-grandson of Nakamura Ganjirō I and the great-great-grandson of Nakamura Kanjaku III, two of the most important Kabuki actors of the Meiji era.

Due to this family relationship, he is related to some of the most important Kabuki actors of the Showa and Heisei eras, such as Nakamura Ganjirō II, Sakata Tōjūrō IV, Nakamura Ganjirō IV, and Nakamura Senjaku III.

== Selected filmography ==
=== Film ===
- Kwaidan (1965)
- Lone Wolf and Cub: Baby Cart in Peril (1972)
- Hissatsu Shikakenin Baian Arijigoku (1973)
- Hissatsu Shikakenin Shunsetsu shikakebari (1974)
- Mori no Irubasho (2018)
- Mujina Pass (2024)
- Shinpei (2025), the head of the Yamada family

=== Television ===
- Taiga drama
  - Shin Heike Monogatari (1972) as Kiso Yoshinaka
  - Tokugawa Ieyasu (1983) as Imagawa Ujizane
  - Dokuganryū Masamune (1987) as Asano Nagamasa
  - Yae's Sakura (2013) as Shimazu Nariakira
- Hissatsu Shikakenin (1972) as Nishimura Sanai
- Sayonara Ri Kōran (1989) as Kazuo Hasegawa
- Unmeitōge (1993) as Hattori Hanzo
- Asa ga Kita (2015) as Imai Tadamasa
