= Lady from Hell =

1949 film directed by Motoyoshi Oda

- Film poster
- Directed by: Motoyoshi Oda
- Screenplay by: Akira Kurosawa; Motosada Nishiki
- Produced by: Tomoyuki Tanaka; Keiji Matsuzaki
- Starring: Michiyo Kogure; Eitaro Ozawa; Takashi Shimura
- Cinematography: Shunichiro Nakao
- Music by: Ryōichi Hattori
- Production companies: Toho; Matsuzaki Productions
- Distributed by: Toho
- Release date: March 15, 1949 (Japan)
- Running time: 72 minutes
- Country: Japan
- Language: Japanese

Lady from Hell (Japanese: 地獄の貴婦人, Hepburn: Jigoku no Kifujin) is a 1949 Japanese action drama film directed by Motoyoshi Oda and co-written by Akira Kurosawa, with special effects by Eiji Tsuburaya. The film has been called a "protest movie" which "portrayed a cornucopia of corruption and indicted every known example of postwar exploitation: black-marketeering, crooked politicians, blackmailing journalists, and a decaying aristocracy." Lady of Hell is regarded as one of Oda's most celebrated films.

== Plot ==
It has been three and a half years since the atomic bombings of Hiroshima and Nagasaki, and Japan is facing severe economic turmoil due to inflation. In an effort to stabilize the economy, the tax authorities establish a "T-men" squad to investigate tax evasion, one of the primary causes of economic instability.

The investigation focuses on Fujimura Sangyo, a company suspected of maintaining fraudulent financial records. Despite a thorough inspection by the T-men and police, the incriminating documents remain undiscovered. Meanwhile, journalist Tachibana is determined to uncover the truth and continues his pursuit of the case.

At the same time, political figure Nango is romantically involved with former Countess Mibu, who also becomes the object of Fujimura's interest. As political corruption and corporate fraud intertwine, Tachibana discovers crucial evidence linking Nango and Fujimura Sangyo. However, before he can reveal his findings, he mysteriously disappears.

The authorities intensify their investigation, leading to a dramatic confrontation between the police, the T-men, and the corrupt parties involved. Fujimura, desperate to protect his influence, resorts to extreme measures. In a final clash in Atami, Fujimura meets his downfall, bringing resolution to the tangled web of corruption. As the case concludes, the T-men reflect on their mission, stating, "The future is important."

== Cast ==
- Eitarō Ozawa as Fujimura
- Michiyo Kogure as Mrs. Mibu
- Akitake Kōno as Tachibana
- Takashi Shimura as Chief of Police
- Minoru Takada as Doi
- Shin Tokudaiji as Yoshioka
- Ichiro Ryuzaki as Nango
- Kinzō Shin as Kano
- Yasuo Hisamatsu as Mihara

== Production ==
=== Crew ===
- Motoyoshi Oda – Director
- Eiji Tsuburaya – Special effects director
- Tomoyuki Tanaka – Producer
- Akira Kurosawa – Screenwriter
- Minoru Esaka – Art director
- Akira Watanabe – Special effects art director

Personnel taken from Eiga.com.

=== Development ===
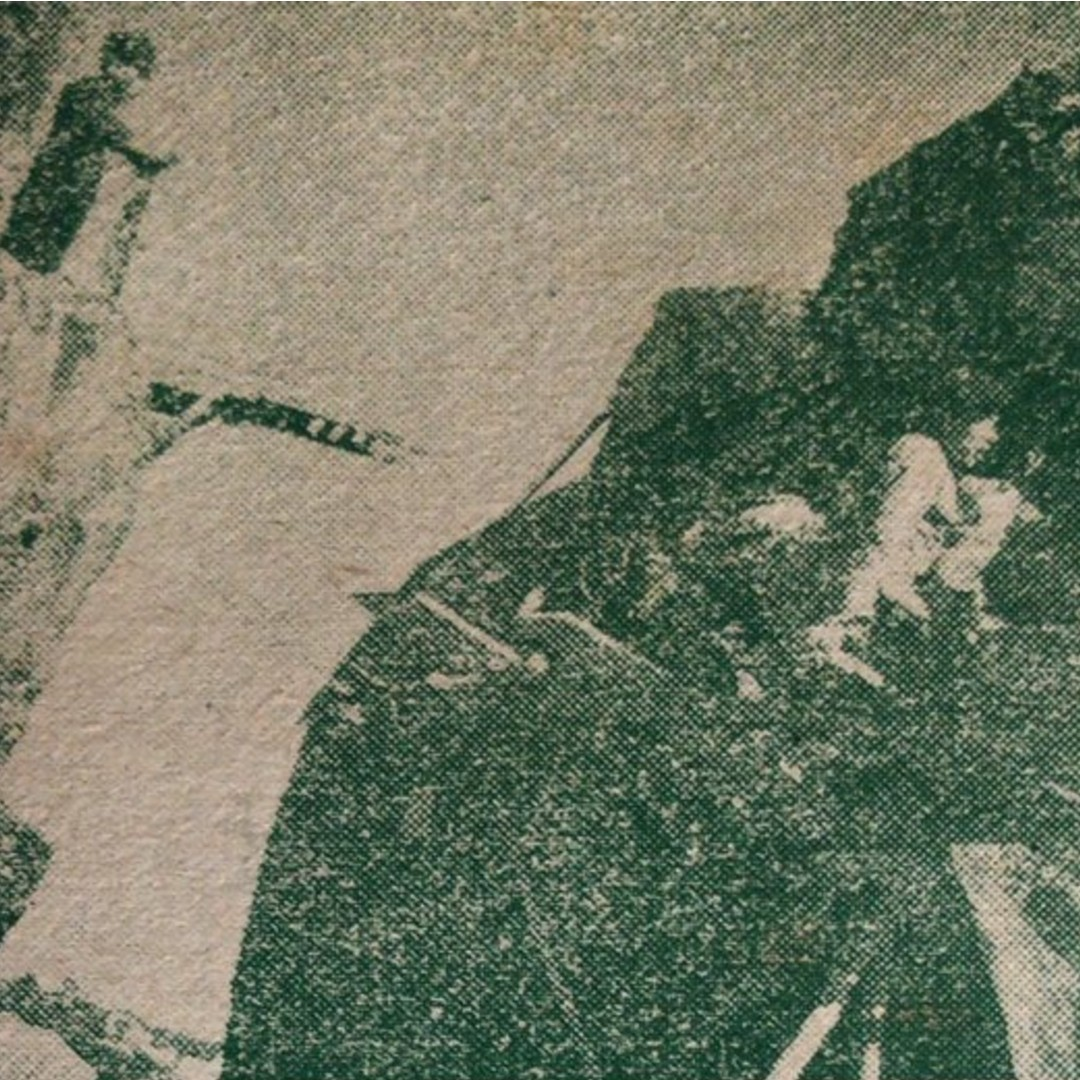
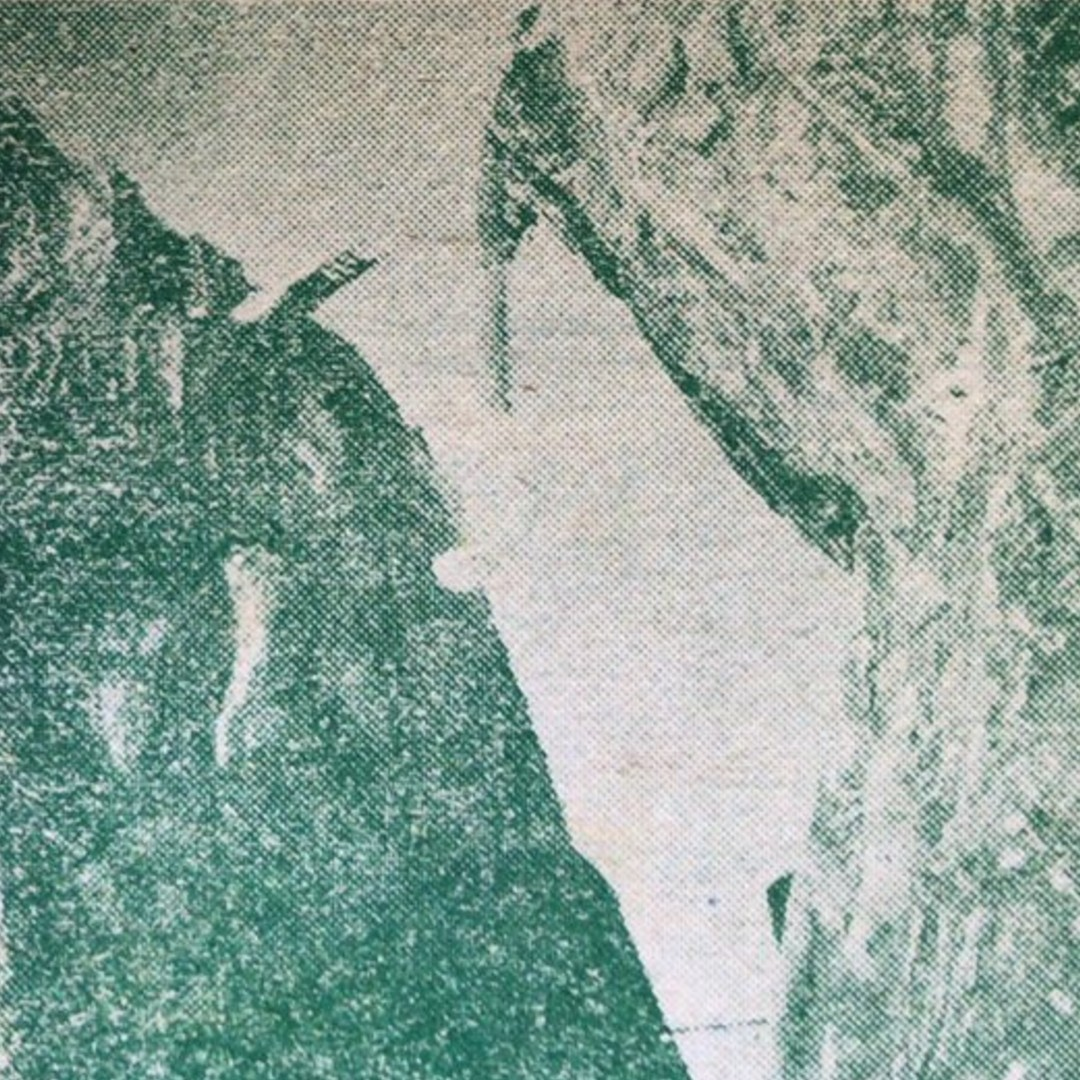
Production stills

The film is one of Toho's first films to use heavy special effects, the technology was then reused for the 1954 Godzilla film. The film's screenplay was co-written by Akira Kurosawa and Motosada Nishiki.

== Release ==
=== Theatrical ===
Lady from Hell was released in Japan on March 15, 1949, where it was distributed by Toho.

=== Home media ===
Asahi Shimbun Publishing – DVD

- Released: October 21, 2019
- Audio: Japanese
- Subtitles: Japanese
- Discs: 1
- Extras:
- Still gallery
- Theatrical poster
- EAN 4910325511197
