= Sono Onna, Jiruba =

Japanese manga series

- First tankōbon volume cover

その女、ジルバ
- Genre: Drama
- Manga
- Written by: Shinobu Arima
- Published by: Shogakukan
- Magazine: Big Comic Original Zōkan
- Original run: June 10, 2011 – August 10, 2018
- Volumes: 5
- Television drama
- Directed by: Kazumasa Nemoto; Makito Murakami
- Written by: Noriko Yoshida
- Music by: Kei Yoshikawa; HAL
- Studio: Telepack; Tokai Television
- Original network: FNS (THK, Fuji TV)
- Original run: January 9, 2021 – March 13, 2021
- Episodes: 10

Sono Onna, Jiruba (その女、ジルバ) is a Japanese manga series written and illustrated by Shinobu Arima. It was serialized in Shogakukan's seinen manga magazine Big Comic Original Zōkan from June 2011 to August 2018. A live-action television drama adaptation aired from January to March 2021.

== Plot ==
Arata Usui is a 40-year-old woman with no romance or savings account. One day, she visits a bar named "Old Jack & Rose" headed by senior citizens. She later joins as a hostess.

== Media ==
=== Manga ===
Written and illustrated by Shinobu Arima, Sono Onna, Jiruba was serialized in Shogakukan's seinen manga magazine Big Comic Original Zōkan from June 10, 2011, to August 10, 2018. Its chapters were collected into five tankōbon volumes released from February 28, 2013, to September 28, 2018.

No.	Release date	ISBN
1	February 28, 2013	978-4-09-185024-9
2	July 30, 2014	978-4-09-186353-9
3	November 30, 2015	978-4-09-187078-0
4	July 28, 2017	978-4-09-189500-4
5	September 28, 2018	978-4-09-860087-8

=== Drama ===
A live-action television drama adaptation aired on Tokai Television, Fuji TV and their affiliates from January 9, to March 13, 2021. The drama starred Chizuru Ikewaki in the lead role, and Noriko Eguchi, Sei Matobu, Shigenori Yamazaki, Mie Nakao, Masami Hisamoto, Reiko Kusamura, and Mitsuko Kusabue in supporting roles.

== Reception ==
The series won the Tezuka Osamu Cultural Prize in 2019.
