= Hissatsu Hitchū Shigotoya Kagyō =

- Also known as: 必殺必中仕事屋稼業
- Genre: Jidaigeki
- Directed by: Eiichi Kudo; Koreyoshi Kurahara
- Starring: Ken Ogata; Mitsuko Kusabue; Ryūzō Hayashi; Mie Nakao; Nobuto Okamoto
- Theme music composer: Masaaki Hirao
- Country of origin: Japan
- Original language: Japanese
- No. of episodes: 28

Production
- Producers: Hisashi Yamauchi; Rikyū Nakagawa
- Running time: 45 minutes (per episode)
- Production companies: Asahi Broadcasting Corporation; Shochiku

Original release
- Network: ANN (ABC, NET)
- Release: 1975 – 1975

Hissatsu Hitchū Shigotoya Kagyō (必殺必中仕事屋稼業) is a Japanese television jidaigeki or period drama that was broadcast in 1975. It is the 5th in the Hissatsu series. This was the first entry in the Hissatsu series to air on NET Television's ANN network as franchise producer ABC switched to ANN during that year.

== Cast ==
- Ken Ogata : Shiranu Kaono Hanbei
- Ryūzō Hayashi : Masakichi
- Nobuto Okamoto : Risuke
- Mie Nakao : Oharu (Hanbei's wife)
- Mitsuko Kusabue : Osei She returns in Edo Professional Hissatsu Shōbainin (1978).

== See also ==
- Hissatsu Shikakenin (First in the Hissatsu series)
- Hissatsu Shiokinin (2nd in the Hissatsu series)
- Shin Hissatsu Shiokinin (10th in the Hissatsu series)
