= The Honjin Murders =

Novel by Seishi Yokomizo

- Author: Seishi Yokomizo
- Original title: 本陣殺人事件 (Honjin satsujin jiken)
- Translator: Louise Heal Kawai
- Language: Japanese
- Series: Kosuke Kindaichi files
- Release number: 1
- Genre: Mystery fiction
- Set in: Okayama
- Publisher: Kadokawa Shoten, Pushkin Press (English translation)
- Publication date: 1946
- Publication place: Japan
- English publication date: 2019
- Pages: 192
- Awards: Mystery Writers of Japan Award (1948)
- ISBN: 978-4-04-130408-2 978-1-78-227500-8
- Followed by: Gokumon Island

The Honjin Murders (本陣殺人事件, Honjin satsujin jiken) is a mystery novel by Seishi Yokomizo. It was serialized in the magazine Houseki from April to December 1946, and won the first Mystery Writers of Japan Award in 1948. It was filmed as Death at an Old Mansion in 1975. In 2019, it was translated into English for the first time by Louise Heal Kawai, and the translation was named by The Guardian as one of the best recent crime novels in 2019.

The novel introduces Kosuke Kindaichi, a popular fictional detective who featured in seventy-seven Yokomizo mysteries. In it, he solves a locked-room mystery murder that takes place in an isolated mansion (honjin) blanketed in snow. Yokomizo had read classic Western detective novels extensively, and the novel makes allusions to John Dickson Carr, Gaston Leroux, and others, with several mentions of Leroux's The Mystery of the Yellow Room as an emblematic locked-room mystery. Though writing a noir and sometimes graphic murder mystery, Yokomizo worked within the tradition of literary Japanese aesthetics. He frequently paused to include lyrical descriptions of nature, the mansion, and the characters. The novel provides a detailed sense of place, including repeated references to cardinal directions and a detailed sketch of the murder scene. Koto music, instruments, and implements play a recurring role in the case.

In addition to the central mystery, Yokomizo uses the story to illuminate the traditions, customs, and agrarian rhythm of rural Japan in the early twentieth century as well as anxieties about changing class distinctions. The omniscient narrator, in an aside to the "Gentle reader," explains that the word "lineage, which has all but fallen out of usage in the city, is even today alive and well in rural villages like this one," and the killer's motive is revealed to relate to an obsession with traditional concepts of honor and family bloodlines.

== Story ==
The novel takes place in 1937 in an unspecified rural village in Okayama. The anonymous narrator reconstructs the events surrounding the legendary double murder of a married couple, based on witness statements and various documents. The narrative centres around the wealthy Ichiyanagi family, living in a honjin.

Kenzo, the family's eldest son, decides to marry a simple primary school teacher against the firm protest of the tradition-conscious family. Two days before the wedding day, an unknown man is seen in the village, with a conspicuous scar on his face and only three fingers on his right hand. He inquires about the house of the Ichiyanagi family and also appears there on the evening of the wedding, where he hands the groom Kenzo a letter. Kenzo, however, tears it up without a word.

Early in the morning after the wedding night, screams and then the music of a koto are heard from the family's nearby annexe, which was intended for the newly married couple. The residents rush to the newly wedded couple's bedroom, only to find the couple killed in a brutal fashion. A Japanese sword is later found thrust into the ground in the middle of the garden, with no footprints on the surrounding thick snow, creating a perfect locked room mystery.

During their investigation, police find a number of bloody fingerprints inside the house, which turn out to be those of the Three-fingered man. He had asked for a glass of water in the village, on which his prints have been found as a reference.

Ginzo, the uncle of the murdered bride, calls in Kosuke Kindaichi, an amateur detective.

A number of clues point to the Three-fingered man as the murderer. Parts of the letter to Kenzo are found, which is signed "Your Mortal enemy". In Kenzo's diary, police find a photo of the Three-fingered man, also described as "My Mortal enemy". Finally, the youngest daughter of the family, Suzuko, claims to have seen the Three-fingered man in the garden the day after the murders when she went to visit her cat's grave.

Kosuke Kindaichi comes across a large collection of various crime novels in the family's mansion, all of which belong to the family's youngest son, Saburo. The two discuss the concept of murder in a locked room. A short time later, Saburo is found wounded at the scene of the crime. Despite life-threatening injuries, he survives and states that he had been looking for the solution to the case in the annex and had been attacked the Three-fingered man. Once again, the perpetrator cannot be found and the doors of the house are locked.

A series of letters written by Katsuko, the bride, reveal that she already had a lover before the wedding who bore a grudge against her because of their separation. To everyone's surprise, however, this lover is not the man with the three fingers.

Kindaichi finds a severed hand with three fingers in the grave of Suzuko's beloved cat and a little later the body of the Three-fingered man with a large wound in the chest in a charcoal oven near the estate.

At the crime scene, Kindaichi solves the murder. Through questioning and the impeccable state of his diary, Kindaichi is able to conclude that Kenzo was obsessed with cleanliness. When he learned that his fiancée was no longer a virgin, but that he could not dissolve the marriage without losing face, he decided to kill her and then himself, making the act look like a double murder. In order to accomplish this, he attached the sword to a string of the koto, which led out through the shutter, a traditional Japanese ranma transom with a decorative gap above the sliding door, where it was attached to a water wheel. As the wheel turned, it drew out the sword that Kenzo used in the murder. Using a koto bridge, it was flung from the string into the snow, where witnesses later found it. The koto was played by Kenzo himself to mask the sounds the string made when it slid across the bamboo in the garden. Originally, Kenzo had planned to suggest the perpetrator's escape through the window, but since it had been snowing, the lack of footprints would have been a contradiction, so Kenzo was forced to keep the window closed, making the murder seem like an impossible crime. Also involved in the plan was his younger brother Saburo, who turns out to be the true mastermind behind the crime. After catching his brother preparing the mechanism, he became involved and decided to help him - on the one hand to get part of the life insurance, on the other to satisfy his urge for superiority as it is revealed he may be a psychopath. The crucial mechanism, according to Kindaichi, was probably inspired by the one in the Sherlock Holmes short story "The Riddle of Thor Bridge", in which a similar concept is used to make a suicide look like a murder. It was Saburo who edited the diary pages and glued the Three-fingered man's driving licence photo into Kenzo's diary. His injury was self-inflicted as he tried to demonstrate his mechanism again, only the severity of the cut was unintentional.

The Three-fingered man was an uninvolved bus driver, who, according to the autopsy, died from exhaustion after a long hike near the estate. Kenzo discovered the corpse and cut off his hand so that he could fill the room with his fingerprints before the crime. He also disguised himself on the evening of the crime and delivered the apparent letter to himself. Saburo hid the hand in the dead cat's grave, where he is mistakenly identified as the wanted man by the sleepwalking Suzuko.

The narrator eventually elaborates that Saburo had to serve in the Second Sino-Japanese War as a punishment, where he fell in battle. Several other members of the family also died within a short time, so that the murder essentially marked the end of the family's wealth.

== Main characters ==
=== Key figures ===
An omniscient narrator
Writer of detective stories
Kosuke Kindaichi
A private detective, summoned by Ginzo Kubo
Detective Inspector Tsunejiro Isokawa
An inspector from Okayama prefecture in charge of the case

=== The Ichiyanagi Family ===
Ihei Ichiyanagi
Great-uncle of Kenzo, Ryosuke etc.
Itoko Ichiyanagi
Mother of Kenzo, Taeko, Ryuuji, Saburo, Suzuko; widowed
Kenzo Ichiyanagi
The eldest son, the present head of family, and an independent scholar of philosophy, engaged to Katsuko Kubo
Taeko Ichiyanagi
The eldest daughter, married and living in Japanese-occupied Shanghai
Ryuuji Ichiyanagi
The second son, a doctor employed at an Osaka hospital
Saburo Ichiyanagi
The ne'er-do-well third son, an avid reader and collector of detective novels
Suzuko Ichiyanagi
The second daughter, a seventeen-year-old but with the mind of a child but a skilled koto player

Ryosuke Ichiyanagi
An Ichiyanagi first-cousin, the head of a branch of the family who shoulders much of the day-to-day management of the estate
Akiko Ichiyanagi
Ryosuke's wife

Sakue Ichiyanagi
Husband of Itoko, father of Kenzo, Taeko, Ryuuji, Saburo, Suzuko, deceased
Hayato Ichiyanagi
Uncle of Kenzo, Taeko, Ryuuji, Saburo, Suzuko, father of Ryosuke, deceased

=== The Kubo Family ===
Rinkichi Kubo
Father of Katsuko, deceased
Ginzo Kubo
Katsuko's phlegmatic uncle and guardian, prosperous and yet a tenant farmer and therefore lower class
Katsuko Kubo
A schoolteacher, fiancee of Kenzo Ichiyanagi
Shizuko Shiraki
Friend of Katsuko Kubo

== Adaptations ==
=== 1947 film ===
The Man with Three Fingers. Directed by Sadatsugu Matsuda and starring Chiezō Kataoka.

=== 1975 film ===
Death at an Old Mansion. Directed by Yoichi Takabayashi and starring Akira Nakao.

=== 1977 television adaptation ===
The Honjin Murders. Three part adaptation as part of the television series Seishi Yokomizo, starring Ikko Furuya.

=== 1983 television adaptation ===
The Honjin Murder Case – A Wedding Night Stained by Three-Fingered Blood. Two hour television film, again starring Ikko Furuya.

=== 1992 television adaptation ===
Seishi Yokomizo Series: The Honjin Murders—A Great Detective Tackles the Mystery of a Bizarre Locked-Room Murder!? Two hour television drama, starring Tsurutaro Kataoka.

=== Visual novel adaptation ===
Kindaichi Mystery Series: The Honjin Murders is a visual novel adaption released on the 23rd of April, 2025. The game was created and published by coly Inc on Steam and the Nintendo Switch.
