= Hissatsu Karakurinin Keppūhen =

- Also known as: 必殺からくり人・血風編
- Genre: Jidaigeki
- Directed by: Eiichi Kudo; Koreyoshi Kurahara
- Starring: Tsutomu Yamazaki; Mitsuko Kusabue; Hideko Yoshida; Peter (actor)
- Theme music composer: Masaaki Hirao
- Country of origin: Japan
- Original language: Japanese
- No. of episodes: 11

Production
- Producers: Hisashi Yamauchi; Rikyū Nakagawa
- Running time: 45 minutes (per episode)
- Production companies: Asahi Broadcasting Corporation; Shochiku

Original release
- Network: ANN (ABC, NET)
- Release: April 1976 – October 1976

Hissatsu Karakurinin Keppūhen (必殺からくり人・血風編) is a Japanese television jidaigeki or period drama that was broadcast in 1976. It is the second in the Hissatsu Karakurinin series. The lead stars are Tsutomu Yamazaki and Mitsuko Kusabue. It depicts the end of the Edo Period.

== Plot ==
Dozaemon is a samurai of the Satsuma clan. One day his life was saved by Oriku. Oriku runs an inn in Shinagawa but she is also a boss of a group of killers. She takes charge of killing villains with money. Oriku's targets are always villains who escape justice despite their crimes. Dozaemon joins Oriku's group.

== Cast ==
- Tsutomu Yamazaki as Dozaemon
- Mitsuko Kusabue as Oriku
- Hideko Yoshida as Oine
- Kenkichi Hamahata as Naojirō
- Peter (actor) as Shinnosuke

== Directors ==
- Koreyoshi Kurahara Episode 1,5,7
- Eiichi Kudo Episode 2,3

== See also ==
- Hissatsu Shikakenin (First in the Hissatsu series)
- Tasukenin Hashiru (3rd in the Hissatsu series)
- Hissatsu Shiokiya Kagyō (6th in the Hissatsu series)
- Shin Hissatsu Shiokinin (10th in the Hissatsu series)
