= Midori Kiuchi =

Japanese actress (1950–2019)

Midori Kiuchi (Japanese: 木内 みどり, romanized: Kiuchi Midori, September 25, 1950 – November 18, 2019) was a Japanese actress. Beside acting, she was a Japanese representative of the Norbulingka Institute. She supported the maintenance and inheritance of the culture of Tibet. She was born in Nagoya, Aichi Prefecture, Japan.

== Filmography ==
=== TV series ===
Year	Title	Role	Network	Notes
1970	Yasu Bee no Umi	Yasuyo Iwata	TBS	Lead role
1973	Ōkubo Hikozaemon		KTV	
1973	Taiyō ni Hoero!	Namie Katagiri, Fujin Ochiai, Sumie Okamoro	NTV	Episodes 75, 196, and 228
1974	Furimuku na Tsurukichi		NHK	Episode 4
1975	Kage Dōshin II	Ohama	MBS	Episode 3
1975	Shikijō no Bishō		TBS	
1976	Akai Unmei	Akiko Shimojo	TBS	
1976	Akai Shōgeki	Misako Osugi	TBS	
1977	Ichiban Hoshi		NHK	
1977	Ō Hibari!		TBS	
1978	Princess Comet		TBS	
1978	Akai Gekitotsu	Eiko Ishida	TBS	Episode 1
1979	Sannan San Josei Itsupiki		TBS	
1980	Seishun Shokun! Natsu		TBS	
1980	House Kodomo Gekijō		TV Asahi	Commentary
1980	Hitori Koi Futari Koi Minna Koi	Nanako	TBS	
1981	Nonomura Byōin Monogatari	Nurse	TBS	
1981	Monmon Doraeti	Kurumi Suzuki	TV Tokyo	
1982	Sayonara Sankaku Mata Kite Shikaku		TBS	
1982	Hiatari Ryōkō!	Chigusa Mizusawa	NTV	
1982	Akujo no Jōtaijō		TV Asahi	
1983	Tokugawa Ieyasu	Sayo	NHK	Taiga drama
1983	Seiichi Morimura no Kōsō no Shikaku		TV Asahi	
1983	Kangofu Nikki Part I	Nurse	TBS	
1983	Shōwa Shi jū Roku-nen Kiyoshi Okubo no Hanzai		TBS	
1984	Kokoro wa Itsumo Ramune-iro	Oharu	NHK	
1984	Beat Takeshi no Gakumon Nosusume	Kikue Natsume	TBS	
1986	Seicho Matsumoto no Kuroi Jukai		TV Asahi	
1986	Takekurabe		NTV	Narrator
1990	Hakodate no Onna		TV Asahi	
1990	Minami-kun no Koibito		TBS	
1990	Nagi no Kōkei		TV Asahi	
1991	Yonimo Kimyōna Monogatari	Ranko Shibusawa	Fuji TV	
1992	Seichō Matsumoto Sakka Katsudō 40 Shūnenkinen Meisōchizu	Setsuko Sotoura	TBS	
1994	Ariyo Saraba	Haruko Hanaoka	TBS	
1995	Sale!		ABC	
1996	Oretachi no Yonaoshi Gōtō	Keiko Murota	TV Asahi	
1996	Iguana Girl		TV Asahi	
1997	Kimi no te ga Sasayaite Iru	Haruko Takeda	TV Asahi	
1998	Shōnen-tachi	Ryoko Morimoto	NHK	
2003	Sensei no Kaban		WOWOW	
2003	Anata no Jinsei o Hakobi Shimasu!	Yasuko	TBS	Episode 2
2004	Mother & Lover		KTV	Episodes 11 and 12
2005	Oniyome Nikki	Yasuko Tashiro	KTV	
2008	Kaze no Graden		Fuji TV	
2012	Renai Kentei	Hisako Tsuji	NHK BS Premium	
2012	Resident: 5-ri no Kenshui	Junko Kawakami	TBS	Episode 3
2018	Segodon		NHK	Taiga drama

=== Films ===
Year	Title	Role	Notes
1971	Shiosai	Chiyoko	
1974	Karafuto 1945 Summer Hyosetsu no Mon	Yayoi Nakamura	
1975	Zesshō	Mihoko	
1976	Tsuma to Onna no ma	Keiko Sawamoto	
1985	Kanashii kibun de joke	Riyoko	
1986	Willi the Kid no Atarashī Yoake		
1986	Sorobanzuku	Momoko	
1986	Yaban Hito no yō ni		
1990	The Sting of Death		
1992	Okoge		
1993	Daibyonin	Nurse	
1995	Maborosi	Michiko	
1998	Rakka Suru Yūgata	Masae Tsubota	
2004	Socrates in Love	Sakutaro's mother	
2006	San-nen mi Komoru		
2007	A Long Walk	Yasuda's wife	
2010	A Memory	Teruyo Aoyagi	
2013	Girl in the Sunny Place	Mayuko Watarai	
2014	Shanti Days 365-nichi, Shiawasena Kokyū	Sato's wife	
2014	0.5 mm	Yukiko Kataoka	
2019	Kohaku		
2020	Last Letter		
2021	A Day with No Name		
