= Motoyoshi Oda =

Japanese filmmaker

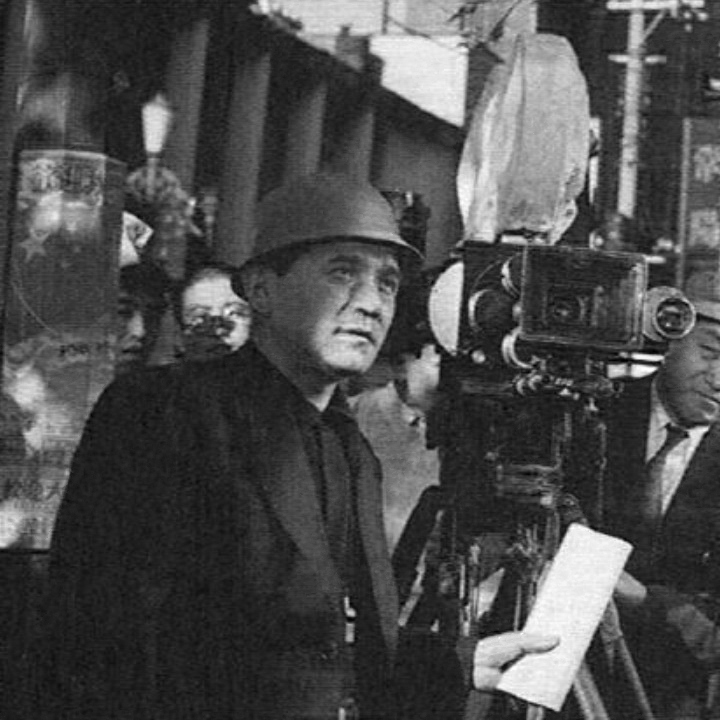
- Oda in 1954
- Born: 21 July 1909; Moji, Kitakyushu, Fukuoka, Japan
- Died: 21 October 1973 (aged 64); Tokyo, Japan
- Occupation: Film director
- Years active: 1936–1958

Motoyoshi Oda (小田 基義, Oda Motoyoshi; 21 July 1909 – 21 October 1973) (Note: Also romanized Yotoyoshi Oda) was a Japanese filmmaker who directed over 50 films in his career.

An English major who graduated from Waseda University in 1935, Motoyoshi Oda was accepted into the directors' program at Tokyo's P.C.L. (Photo Chemical Laboratories, a film company later incorporated into Toho Studios).

He studied under director Kajiro Yamamoto, along with future directors Akira Kurosawa, Ishirō Honda, and Senkichi Taniguchi. When the latter two trainees were drafted into WW2, Oda found his career accelerated. He was promoted to director in 1940 with Song of Kunya. Toho kept Oda working as a director of trivial films that had to be made in order to keep product flowing into the theaters, but which offered little time or room for artistic achievement. His most well-known credits are Lady from Hell (1949), Tomei Ningen a 1954 Japanese horror inspired by The Invisible Man, a follow-up to his earlier 1954 film Ghost Man.

The only film he made ever to be shown outside Japan was the second Godzilla film, Godzilla Raids Again (1955), released in the United States as Gigantis, the Fire Monster. Toho insisted that Oda direct as many as seven movies a year, knowing that he could be trusted to deliver them on time. He was by all accounts a popular director with his staff, who affectionately called him "Odabutsu-san" (オダブツさん).

Over his entire career, Motoyoshi Oda directed fifty movies, in addition to his work as assistant director and second-unit direction on Ishiro Honda's Eagle of the Pacific (1953).

After directing the Otora-san series in Toei in 1958, he went on to television drama direction. He died at the age of 64.

== Selected filmography ==
=== Director ===
- Ongaku gonin otoko (1947)
- Lady from Hell (1949)
- Santa and Chiyonoyama (1952)
- Himetaruhaha (1953)
- Katei no jijō nechorinkon no maki (1954)
- Yurei otoko (1954)
- The Invisible Avenger (1954)
- Godzilla Raids Again (1955)
- Akai kanna no hana sakeba (1955)
- Yagate Aozora (1955)
- Masura Ohashutsu Otokai (1955)
- Hesokurishachō to Wanman Shachōhesokuri Shachō Junjōsu (1956)
- Ideyu no Shimai (1956)
- Tōkyō Tekisasunin (1957)
- Otorasan (1957)
- Otorasan no Hōmuran (1958)
- Hanazakari Otorasan (1958)
- Otorasan no obakesōdō (1958)
- Otorasan no kōkyūbi (1958)
- Otorasan daihanjô (1958)

=== Assistant director ===
- Enoken's Ten Millions (1936)
- Eagle of the Pacific (1953)

== Bibliography ==
- Ryfle, Steve (1998). Japan's Favorite Mon-Star: The Unauthorized Biography of the Big G. ECW Press. ISBN 1550223488.
