= Kiichi Nakai =

Japanese actor (born 1961)

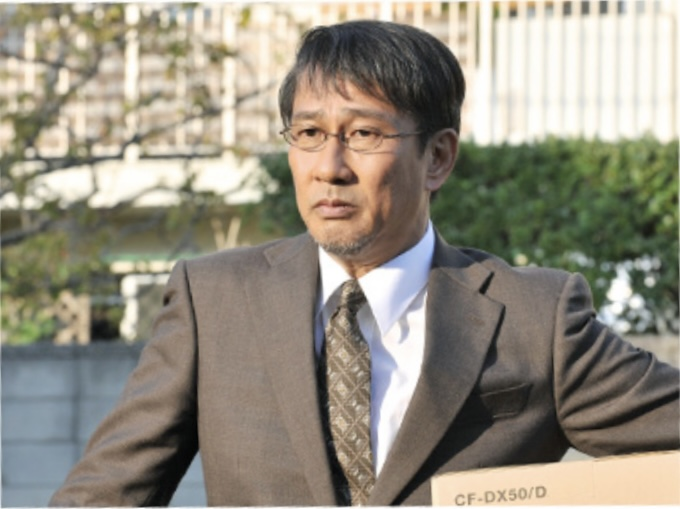
- Born: September 18, 1961 (age 64); Tokyo, Japan
- Occupation: Actor
- Years active: 1981–present

Kiichi Nakai (中井 貴一, Nakai Kiichi; born September 18, 1961) is a Japanese actor. His name was given by Yasujirō Ozu. His father, Keiji Sada, also a movie actor, died when Nakai was only two years old. Nakai started his acting career while he was still in university and was awarded the Rookie of the Year at the Japan Academy Awards in 1981.

He won the Japan Academy Best Supporting Actor award in 1994 (for 47 Ronin) and Best Actor award in 2003 (for When the Last Sword Is Drawn). He also won the award for best supporting actor at the 19th Hochi Film Award for 47 Ronin.

In 2003 he played a Japanese delegate to a Chinese emperor of the Tang dynasty in Warriors of Heaven and Earth. Though a few of his lines are in Japanese, most are in Mandarin.

His older sister, Kie Nakai, is also an actress.

== Selected filmography ==
=== Film ===
| Year | Title | Role | Notes | Ref. |
|---|---|---|---|---|
| 1981 | The Imperial Navy | | | |
| 1983 | Tora-san Goes Religious? | | | |
| 1985 | The Burmese Harp | Mizushima | Lead role | |
| 1985 | The Empty Table | Tamae Kidoji | | |
| 1986 | Final Take | | Lead role | |
| 1987 | Princess from the Moon | Minister of the Military | | |
| 1990 | Tokyo Heaven | Fumio Amemiya | Lead role | |
| 1992 | Gekashitsu | | | |
| 1993 | Moving | | Lead role | |
| 1994 | 47 Ronin | | | |
| 1995 | Marks | | Lead role | |
| 1998 | Begging for Love | | | |
| 1999 | Owls' Castle | | Lead role | |
| 2000 | Tales of the Unusual | Ōishi Kuranosuke | Lead role | |
| 2001 | All About Our House | Himself | | |
| 2001 | The Firefly | | | |
| 2001 | Darkness in the Light | | Lead role | |
| 2002 | Shura no Mure | | | |
| 2003 | When the Last Sword Is Drawn | Yoshimura Kanichiro | Lead role | |
| 2003 | The Yin Yang Master 2 | | | |
| 2003 | Warriors of Heaven and Earth | Emissary Lai Xi | Chinese film | |
| 2005 | Riding Alone for Thousands of Miles | Kenichi Takada (voice) | Chinese film | |
| 2006 | Aegis | | | |
| 2007 | Hero | Akihiko Takita | | |
| 2007 | Dororo | Kagemitsu Daigo | | |
| 2008 | The Magic Hour | Tōru Iawata | | |
| 2008 | Samurai Gangsters | Shimizu no Jirochō | Lead role | |
| 2009 | Amalfi: Rewards of the Goddess | Hiroshi Kataoka (voice) | | |
| 2010 | Railways | Hajime Tsutsui | Lead role | |
| 2011 | A Ghost of a Chance | Tōru Osano | | |
| 2011 | The Warring States | King of Qi | Chinese film | |
| 2011 | Wild 7 | | | |
| 2012 | The Wings of the Kirin | Takeaki Aoyagi | | |
| 2012 | Tenchi: The Samurai Astronomer | Tokugawa Mitsukuni | | |
| 2014 | Zakurozaka no Adauchi | Kingo Shimura | Lead role | |
| 2015 | Again | Haruhiko | Lead role | |
| 2016 | Good Morning Show | Shingo Sumita | Lead role | |
| 2016 | Ken san | Narrator | Documentary film | |
| 2016 | Kōfuku no Alibi | | Lead role | |
| 2017 | Flower and Sword | Oda Nobunaga | | |
| 2017 | Honnōji Hotel | Narrator | | |
| 2018 | We Make Antiques! | Norio Koike | Lead role | |
| 2019 | Hit me Anyone One More Time | Prime Minister Keisuke Kuroda | Lead role | |
| 2019 | Aircraft Carrier Ibuki | Keiichi Nakano | | |
| 2020 | We Make Antiques! Kyoto Rendezvous | Norio Koike | Lead role | |
| 2022 | Dreaming of the Meridian Arc | Ikemoto / Takahashi Kageyasu | Lead role | |
| 2023 | We Make Antiques! Osaka Dreams | Norio Koike | Lead role | |
| 2024 | Silence of the Sea | Suiken | | |
| 2024 | Samurai Detective Onihei: Blood for Blood | Kyōgoku Takahisa | | |
| 2025 | Yukikaze | Seiichi Itō | | |

=== Television ===
| Year | Title | Role | Notes | Ref. |
|---|---|---|---|---|
| 1983–1997 | Apples and Oranges | Yoshio Nakategawa | Lead role; 4 seasons | |
| 1988 | Takeda Shingen | Takeda Shingen | Lead role, Taiga drama | |
| 1995 | Hachidai Shōgun Yoshimune | Tokugawa Muneharu | Taiga drama | |
| 2001 | Someday Like Storm | | | |
| 2003 | Musashi | Yagyū Munenori | Taiga drama | |
| 2005 | Yoshitsune | Minamoto no Yoritomo | Taiga drama | |
| 2007 | Barefoot Gen | Daikichi Nakaoka | Lead role; miniseries | |
| 2009 | Smile | Kazuma Ito | | |
| 2010 | Japanese Americans | Chokichi Hiramatsu | | |
| 2012 | Priceless | Kengo Moai | | |
| 2012 | Taira no Kiyomori | Taira no Tadamori | Taiga drama | |
| 2012–2025 | Second to Last Love | Wahei Nagakura | Lead role; 3 seasons | |
| 2016 | Kinpika | Kenta Sakaguchi | Lead role | |
| 2018 | Musume no Kekkon | Takahiko Kunieda | Lead role; TV movie | |
| 2021 | The Grand Family | Daisuke Manpyo | Lead role | |
| 2023 | Taiga Drama ga Umareta Hi | Narushima | TV movie | |

=== Video games ===
| Year | Title | Role | Notes | Ref. |
|---|---|---|---|---|
| 2020 | Yakuza: Like a Dragon | Masumi Arakawa | | |
| 2024 | Like a Dragon: Infinite Wealth | Masumi Arakawa | | |

=== Japanese dubbing ===
| Title | Role | Notes | Ref. |
|---|---|---|---|
| Despicable Me 2 | Eduardo "El Macho" Pérez | | |

== Honours ==
- Medal with Purple Ribbon (2020)
