= Kosuke Kindaichi =

Fictional Japanese detective created by Seishi Yokomizo

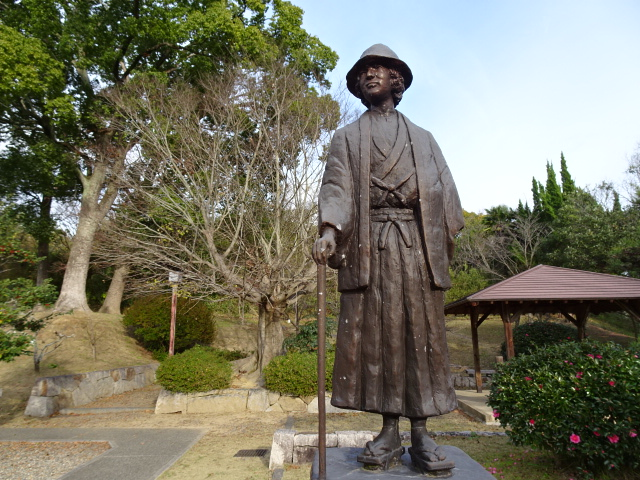
- A bronze statue of Kindaichi Kōsuke in Japan
- First appearance: The Honjin Murders (1946)
- Created by: Seishi Yokomizo
- Portrayed by: Kōji Ishizaka

In-universe information
- Gender: Male
- Occupation: Private detective
- Nationality: Japanese

Kosuke Kindaichi (金田一 耕助, Kindaichi Kōsuke) is a fictional detective created by Japanese author Seishi Yokomizo. One of Japan's most famous fictional detectives, Kindaichi appeared in 77 novels and short stories between 1946 and 1980. The series has sold over 55 million books, and has been adapted into numerous films and TV series.

Kindaichi first appeared in the 1946 novel The Honjin Murders, which won the first Mystery Writers of Japan Award in 1948. Author Seishi Yokomizo continued writing novels and short stories featuring Kindaichi up until his death in 1980.

The character is known for his distinctive scruffy hair and clothes, and has been portrayed in films and TV by many well-known Japanese actors, including Kōji Ishizaka. The character's fame in Japan has been compared to globally-recognisable fictional detectives, including Sherlock Holmes and Hercule Poirot.

== Biography ==
Kosuke Kindaichi was born somewhere in the "general area" of Tōhoku region or Hokkaido in northern Japan. Aged graduating from a local school at 19, he moves to Tokyo to study at "a certain private university". He drops out after a year and travels to the United States with "no particular purpose in mind, and when it transpired that there wasn't much to interest him in America either, he ended up wandering from place to place, supporting himself by washing dishes and the like".

While in America, he becomes addicted to drugs. He nonetheless solves an unspecified murder among Japanese community in San Francisco and is hailed a local hero. He comes to the attention of a benefactor called Ginzo Kubo who has made money in the fruit business. Kindaichi overcomes his drug addition and, supported by Kubo's funds, graduates from an American university. At the same time, he takes a part-time job as an apprentice nurse at an American hospital. After graduating, Kindaichi returns to Japan and sets up as a private detective in Tokyo with Kubo's support.

The events of The Honjin Murders take place in 1937 in which Kindaichi solves a high-profile murder in Okayama Prefecture. This brings him some fame within Japan and the book is referred repeatedly in later novels.

Some time afterwards, he is conscripted into the Imperial Japanese Army. He serves for two years in China amid the Second Sino-Japanese War and, subsequently, "was shunted around different islands to the South ending up in Wewak, New Guinea". He participates in the New Guinea campaign but his battalion is left in an isolated region and is not involved in fighting during the final years of the war. After the Japanese surrender at the end of World War II, he is demobilised and repatriated to Japan.

After his repatriation, and with his Tokyo home destroyed during the Allied bombing, he travels to Gokumon Island in the Seto Inland Sea in 1946 to deliver news of the death of one of his wartime comrades, Chimata Kito. He solves a series of murders on the island which forms the basis for Death on Gokumon Island.

Kindaichi speaks with a "strong" northern Japanese accent. He is described as slightly socially awkward and occasionally stutters. A traditionalist, he insists on wearing Japanese clothing rather than more popular Western-style clothing common at the time. His dishevled mop of hair and habit of vigoriously scraching his head at times of excitement are frequently emphasised at a motif across the books.

== Stories featuring Kosuke Kindaichi ==
The Kosuke Kindaichi series consists of 77 stories, of which 26 are full-length novels, and 51 are short stories or novellas.

Japanese title	Direct translation	Official English title	First serialised	Type of story
Honjin satsujin jiken (本陣殺人事件)	The Honjin Murder Case	The Honjin Murders	1946	Novel
Gokumon-tō (獄門島)	Gokumon Island	Death on Gokumon Island	1947	Novel
Ko-mori to namekuji (蝙蝠と蛞蝓)	The Bat and the Slug		1947	Short story
Kuroneko-tei jiken (黒猫亭事件)	The Black Cat Inn Incident	Murder at the Black Cat Cafe	1947	Short story
Satsujinki (殺人鬼)	A Killer		1947	Short story
Kuroran-hime (黒蘭姫)	Black Orchid Princess		1948	Short story
Yoru aruku (夜歩く)	Walking at Night	She Walks at Night	1948	Novel
Yatsu-haka mura (八つ墓村)	Eight Graves Village	The Village of Eight Graves	1949	Novel
Shi kamen (死仮面)	Death Mask		1949	Short story
Inugami-kei no ichizoku (犬神家の一族)	The Inugami Family	The Inugami Curse	1950	Novel
Jokai (女怪)	The Female Monster		1950	Short story
Sarusuberi no shita te (百日紅の下にて)	Under the Crepe Myrtle Tree		1951	Short story
Jo'ō-batchi (女王蜂)	Queen Bee	The Queen Bee Mystery	1951	Novel
Karasu (カラス)	The Crow		1951	Short story
Akuma ga kitarite Fue wo fuku (悪魔が来りて笛を吹く)	The Devil Comes and Plays the Flute	The Devil's Flute Murders	1951	Novel
Yūrei-za (幽霊座)	The Ghost Theatre		1952	Short story
Kodei (湖泥)	Lake of Mud		1953	Short story
Fushichō (不死蝶)	The Immortal Butterfly		1953	Novel
Ikeru shi kamen (生ける死仮面)	The Living Death Mask		1953	Short story
Meiro no hanayome (迷路の花嫁)	The Bride of the Labyrinth		1954	Novel
Yūrei otoko (幽霊男)	The Ghost Man		1954	Novel
Hanazono no akuma (花園の悪魔)	The Devil of the Flower Garden		1954	Short story
Ochitaru ten'nyo (堕ちたる天女)	Fallen Angel		1954	Short story
Shinkirō no jōnetsu (蜃気楼島の情熱)	The Passion of Mirage Island		1954	Short story
Nemureru hanayome (睡れる花嫁)	The Sleeping Bride		1954	Short story
Mitsukubi-tō (三つ首塔)	The Three-headed Tower		1955	Novel
Kyūketsuga (吸血蛾)	Vampire Moth		1955	Novel
Kurumaido wa naze kushiru (車井戸はなぜ軋る)	Why Does the Well Creak?	Why Does the Well Creak? (published in Murder at the Black Cat Cafe)	1949, revised as a Kindaichi story in 1955	Short story
Kubi (首)	Neck		1955	Short story
Haien no oni (廃園の鬼)	The Demon of the Abandoned Garden		1955	Short story
Doku no ya (毒の矢)	Poison Arrow		1956	Short story
Rō no bijin (蝋美人)	The Wax Beauty		1956	Short story
Kuroi tsubasa (黒い翼)	Black Wings		1956	Short story
Shinigami no ya (死神の矢)	The Grim Reaper's Arrow		1956	Novel
Majō no koyomi (魔女の暦)	The Witch's Calendar		1956	Novel
Kurayami no naka no neko (暗闇の中の猫)	A Cat in the Darkness		1947, revised as a Kindaichi story in 1956	Short story
Yume no naka no on'na (夢の中の女)	The Woman in the Dream		1956	Short story
Nanatsu no kamen (七つの仮面)	The Seven Masks		1956	Short story
Meiro-sō no sangeki (迷路荘の惨劇)	Tragedy at Labyrinth Manor		1956	Novel
Hanayakana yajū (華やかな野獣)	The Glamorous Beast		1956	Short story
Trump-dai-jō no Kubi (トランプ台上の首)	The Head on the Card Table		1957	Short story
Kiri no naka no on'na (霧の中の女)	The Woman in the Mist		1957	Short story
On'na no kettō (女の決闘)	Duel of the Women		1957	Short story
Doro no naka no on'na (泥の中の女)	The Woman in the Mud		1957	Short story
Kaban no naka no on'na (鞄の中の女)	The Woman in the Bag		1957	Short story
Kagami no naka no on'na (鏡の中の女)	The Woman in the Mirror		1957	Short story
Kasa no naka no on'na (傘の中の女)	The Woman under the Umbrella		1957	Short story
Ori no naka no on'na (檻の中の女)	The Woman in the Cage		1957	Short story
Kagami ga ura no satsujin (鏡が浦の殺人)	Murder at Kagami Beach		1957	Short story
Kashi-boat jūsan-gō (貸しボート十三号)	Rental Boat No. 13		1957	Short story
Akuma no temari uta (悪魔の手毬唄)	The Devil's Ball Song	The Little Sparrow Murders	1957	Novel
Kochū bijin (壺中美人)	The Beauty in the Jar		1957	Novel
Shina ōgi no on'na (支那扇の女)	The Woman with the Chinese Fan		1957	Short story
Tobira no kage no on'na (扉の影の女)	The Woman in the Shadow of the Door		1957	Novel
Akuma no kōtansai (悪魔の降誕祭)	The Devil's Nativity		1958	Short story
Hora no naka no on'na (洞の中の女)	The Woman in the Cave		1958	Short story
Kan no naka no on'na (柩の中の女)	The Woman in the Coffin		1958	Short story
Hi no Jūjika (火の十字架)	Crucifixion of Fire		1958	Short story
Aka no naka no on'na (赤の中の女)	The Woman in the Red		1958	Short story
Hitomi no naka no on'na (瞳の中の女)	The Woman in the Eyes		1958	Short story
Spade no Jo'ō (スペードの女王)	The Queen of Spades		1958	Novel
Bara no besso (薔薇の別荘)	Rose Villa		1958	Short story
Akuma no chōji (悪魔の寵児)	The Devil's Favourite Child		1958	Novel
Kōsui no shinjū (香水心中)	Perfume Lovers' Suicide		1958	Short story
Kiri no sansō (霧の山荘)	Mountain Lodge in the Fog		1958	Short story
Jinmensō (人面瘡)	Human-Faced Tumor		1949, revised as a Kindaichi story in 1960	Short story
Mehiru (雌蛭)	Female Leech		1960	Short story
Shiro to kuro (白と黒)	White and Black		1960	Novel
Akuma no hyaku kuchibiru-fu (悪魔の百唇譜)	The Devil's Hundred Lips		1962	Novel
Hidokei no naka no on'na (日時計の中の女)	The Woman in the Sundial		1962	Short story
Ryōki no shimatsusho (猟奇の始末書)	Report on a Bizarre Incident		1962	Short story
Yoru no kurubyō (夜の黒豹	Black Panther of the Night		1963	Novel
Neko yakata (猫館)	The Cat House		1963	Short story
Kawahori otoko (蝙蝠男)	The Bat Man		1964	Short story
Kamen butokai (仮面舞踏会)	Masquerade ball		1962, revised in 1974	Novel
Byoinzaka no kubikukuri no ie (病院坂の首縊りの家)	The House of Hanging on Hospital Slope		1975	Novel
Akuryō-tō (悪霊島)	Evil Spirit Island		1978	

== Works in translation ==
Until the 21st century, the Kosuke Kindaichi books had not been translated into English. However, beginning in 2019, British independent publisher Pushkin Press began translating and releasing Yokomizo's stories:

- The Honjin Murders, published in 2019
- The Inugami Curse, published in 2020
- The Village of Eight Graves, published in 2021
- Death on Gokumon Island, published in 2022
- The Devil's Flute Murders, published in 2023
- The Little Sparrow Murders, published in 2024
- Murder at the Black Cat Cafe, published in 2025
- She Walks at Night, published in 2026
- The Queen Bee Mystery, published in 2027

== In other media ==
=== Film ===
Chiezō Kataoka portrayed Kindaichi in seven films between 1947 and 1956. Seizaburō Kawazu starred in the 1954 film Yurei otoko, while Ryō Ikebe appeared in 1956's Vampire Moth, and Ken Takakura in 1961's Akuma no temari-uta.

Akira Nakao starred as Kindaichi in Yoichi Takabayashi's 1975 adaptation of The Honjin Murders entitled Death at an Old Mansion, which was entered into the 26th Berlin International Film Festival. Kiyoshi Atsumi played the detective in the 1977 film Village of the Eight Gravestones (Yatsuhaka-mura), directed by Yoshitarō Nomura.

Director Kon Ichikawa made six films about Kindaichi, starring Koji Ishizaka:

- The Inugami Family (1976)
- Akuma no temari-uta (1977) (Note: Also known as Rhyme of Vengeance or The Devil's Ballad)
- Gokumon-to (1977)
- Queen Bee (1978)
- The House of Hanging on Hospital Slope (1979)
- The Inugamis (2006)

Toshiyuki Nishida appeared in Devil's Flute (1979). Director Nobuhiko Obayashi made a parody film in 1979 titled The Adventures of Kosuke Kindaichi, starring Ikkô Furuya in the title role. Takeshi Kaga played the character in the 1981 film Akuryoto, whilst 1996's Yatsuhaka-Mura starred Etsushi Toyokawa. Matsuya Onoe stars as Kindaichi in Takashi Shimizu's 2026 version of The Village of Eight Gravestones.

=== Television ===
There have been numerous television drama films starring various different actors as Kindaichi:

- Takaya Kamikawa in Kindaichi Kōsuke File - Meiro Sou no Sangeki (2002, TV Tokyo) and. Kindaichi Kōsuke File - Gokumon Tou (2003, TV Tokyo)
- Goro Inagaki in Inugamike no Ichizoku (2004), Yatsuhakamura (2004), Jōōbachi (2006), Aakuma ga Kitarite Fue o Fuku (2007) and Akuma no Temariuta (2009)
- Sosuke Ikematsu in Kindaichi Kosuke Tōjō! (2016), Kindaichi kōsuke odoru! (2020), Onna no Kettō (2022) and Akuma no Kōtansai (2025)
- Hiroki Hasegawa in Gokumon tō (2016)
- Hidetaka Yoshioka in Akuma ga Kitarite Fue wo Fuku (2018), Yattsu haka-mura (2019) and Inugami-ke no ichizoku (2023)
- Shigeaki Kato in Inugami-ke no ichizoku (2018) and Akuma no Temari-uta (2019)

Actor Ikkō Furuya played Kindaichi on television for nearly 30 years from 1977 to 2005. In 2013 and 2014 a pair of television films were made pairing Kindaichi with another famous fictional Japanese detective Edogawa Ranpo's Kogoro Akechi. Tomohisa Yamashita played Kindaichi, whilst Hideaki Itô was Akechi.

=== Manga and anime ===
A profile of Kosuke appears at the end of the manga Case Closed Volume 6.

Hajime Kindaichi (金田一 一, Kindaichi Hajime), the main character of The Kindaichi Case Files, is depicted as the grandson of Kosuke Kindaichi.

In episode 14 of Lupin the Third Part II, a German count invites the best private detectives from all over the world - including Kindaichi - to the maiden voyage of his blimp in order to catch Lupin III, who is after the count's jewel.

In the Lupin the Third Part IV episode "From Japan With Love", the celebrity detective Akechi Kousuke Holmes is partially named after Kosuke Kindaichi (as well as Kogoro Akechi and Sherlock Holmes).

=== Video Games ===
There has been some game adaptations featuring Kosuke Kindaichi:

- The Inugami Curse was adapted into a Nintendo DS visual novel by FromSoftware on January 22nd, 2009.
- Kindaichi Mystery Series: The Honjin Murders is a visual novel adaption of the novel with the same name on the 23rd of April, 2025 by coly Inc on Steam and the Nintendo Switch.

== See also ==
- Kogoro Akechi
- The Kindaichi Case Files
