= Akiji Kobayashi =

Japanese actor (1930–1996)

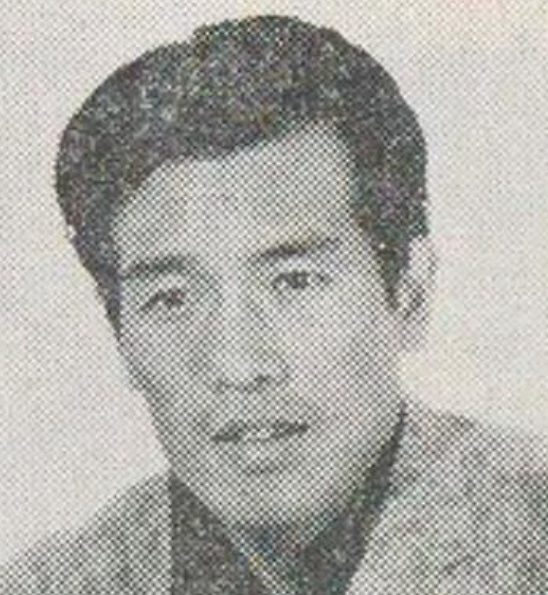
- Born: September 6, 1930; Tokyo, Japan
- Died: August 27, 1996 (aged 65); Yokohama, Japan
- Occupations: Actor, voice actor
- Years active: 1952-1996

Akiji Kobayashi (小林昭二, Kobayashi Akiji; September 6, 1930 – August 27, 1996), sometimes credited as Shōji Kobayashi, was a Japanese actor. He attended Nihon University College of Art, but withdrew before completing his degree and joined the Haiyuza Theatre Company in 1949. He made his film debut with Satsujin Yogisha in 1952.

He is best known for portraying the role of Captain Toshio Muramatsu in the 1966-1967 television series, Ultraman. From 1983-84, he appeared in popular television detective series Seibu Keisatsu. His other notable television role was Tōbei Tachibana ("Oya-san") in several series of the Kamen Rider franchise. He was one of the Kon Ichikawa's favorite actors, appearing in 12 Ichikawa's films. His final film appearance was Yatsuhaka-mura as Head of a factory directed by Kon Ichikawa in 1996. He was the official dubbing artist of John Wayne and Richard Crenna. Kobayashi died of lung cancer in Yokohama on August 27, 1996.

== Partial filmography ==
=== Films ===
- 1952: Satsujin Yôgisha
- 1962: Foundry Town as Heisan
- 1962: The Human Condition as Nonaka Shôi
- 1962: Kyûpora no aru machi as Hei-san
- 1962: Harakiri (Seppuku)
- 1963: Youth of the Beast (Yaju no seishun) as Tatsuo Nomoto
- 1964: Kwaidan (segment "Chawan no naka")
- 1965: Ninpō-chushingura
- 1966: The Pornographers
- 1968: Ultra Seven
- 1969: The Oiwa Phantom as Naosuke
- 1969 Chōkōsō no Akebono as Komori
- 1970: Buraikan
- 1970: Mujo
- 1971: The Return of Ultraman
- 1972: Kamen Rider vs. Shocker as Tobei Tachibana
- 1972: Ultraman Ace
- 1972: Lone Wolf and Cub: Baby Cart at the River Styx as Ozunu Kurokuwa
- 1972: Kamen Rider vs. Ambassador Hell as Tobei Tachibana
- 1972: Hanzo the Razor
- 1972: Daigoro vs. Goliath
- 1973: Kamen Rider V3 the Movie as Tobei Tachibana
- 1973: Kamen Rider V3 vs. Destron Mutants as Tobei Tachibana
- 1974: Karei-naru Ichizoku (1974)
- 1974: Kamen Rider X the Movie as Tobei Tachibana
- 1974: Kamen Rider X: Five Riders vs. King Dark as Tobei Tachibana
- 1974: Hanuman pob Har Aimoddaeng
- 1974: Kamen Rider Amazon: The Movie as Tôbei Tachibana
- 1975: Kamen Rider Stronger the Movie as Tôbei Tachibana
- 1976: The Inugami Family as Kôkichi Inugami
- 1977: Akuma no temari-uta as Hisakabe - Chi'e's Manager
- 1977: Gokumon-to as Takezô - Chief Fisherman / Narration
- 1978: Queen Bee as Detective Kogure
- 1978: Hi no Tori as Yamatai
- 1979: Byoinzaka no Kubikukuri no Ie
- 1979: Moero Attack
- 1979: Ultraman: Great Monster Decisive Battle as Captain 'Cap' Toshio Muramatsu
- 1979: Sanada Yukimura no Bōryaku as Honda Masazumi
- 1979: Ultraman as Captain 'Cap' Toshio Muramatsu
- 1979: Immortal Kamen Rider Special as Tobei Tachibana
- 1979: Nichiren
- 1980: Shogun Assassin as Lord Kurogawa
- 1980: Koto
- 1981: Kofuku
- 1981: Yuki
- 1982: Keiji monogatari as Todo
- 1982: Suspicion as Chief of Police, Ishihara
- 1982: Kaikyô
- 1983: The Makioka Sisters
- 1985: The Empty Table
- 1986: Bakumatsu seishun graffiti: Ronin Sakamoto Ryoma as Hanazuki
- 1986: Kizudarake no kunshô as Inoue
- 1986: Jittemai
- 1988: Kamen Norida
- 1989: Black Rain as Katayama
- 1989: Shaso as Takashi Kuriyama
- 1989: Hana no Furu Gogo
- 1990: Best Guy
- 1990: Kumo no yôni, kaze no yôni as Konton (voice)
- 1990: Urutora Q za mûbi: Hoshi no densetsu
- 1991: Tenkawa densetsu satsujin jiken as Chief Police
- 1991: Satsujin ga ippai
- 1991: Godzilla vs. King Ghidorah as Yuzo Tsuchiashi
- 1992: Hashire Melos! as Dionysius II (voice)
- 1992: Godzilla and Mothra: The Battle for Earth as Yuzo Tsuchiashi
- 1993: Kaettekita Kogarashi Monjirō
- 1994: Shijûshichinin no shikaku as Kurobei Ôno
- 1994: Getting Any? as Chief of World Defence Force
- 1995: Ie naki ko 2
- 1996: Ultraman Zearth as Fisherman (cameo)
- 1996: Gamera 2: Attack of Legion as Soldier (cameo)
- 1996: Yatsuhaka-mura as Head of a factory (final film role)

=== Television ===
- 1966: Ultra Q (TV series) as Lieutenant Colonel Amano
- 1966-1967: Ultraman (TV series) as Captain 'Cap' Toshio Muramatsu
- 1968-1969: Operation : Mystery (TV Series) as Taizō Machida
- 1971: Daichūshingura as Terasaka Kichiemon
- 1971-1973: Kamen Rider (TV series) as Tōbei Tachibana
- 1972: Shin Heike Monogatari (Taiga drama)
- 1973: Kunitori Monogatari (Taiga drama)
- 1973: Kamen Rider V3 (TV series) as Tōbei Tachibana
- 1974: Kamen Rider X (TV series) as Tōbei Tachibana
- 1974: Kamen Rider Amazon (TV series) as Tōbei Tachibana
- 1975: Kamen Rider Stronger (TV series) as Tōbei Tachibana
- 1976: The Kagestar as Inspector Tonda
- 1979: Akō Rōshi (TV series) as Hara Sōemon
- 1983-84: Seibu Keisatsu (TV series) as Detective Minami Chōtarō
- 1994: Furuhata Ninzaburō (TV series) (ep.5)

=== Dubbing ===
- John Wayne
  - Stagecoach — Henry the Ringo Kid
  - 3 Godfathers — Robert Marmaduke Hightower
  - She Wore a Yellow Ribbon — Captain Nathan Brittles
  - The Searchers — Ethan Edwards
  - Rio Bravo — John T. Chance
  - The Horse Soldiers – Colonel John Marlowe
  - North to Alaska – Sam McCord
  - True Grit — Rooster Cogburn
  - Chisum — John Chisum
  - The Cowboys — Wil Andersen
  - Rooster Cogburn — Rooster Cogburn
  - The Shootist — John Bernard Books
- First Blood (1990 TBS edition) (Colonel Sam Trautman (Richard Crenna))
- The Last Emperor (1989 TV Asahi edition) (Jin Yuan (Ying Ruocheng))

== Bibliography ==
- Oyassan: Tachibana, Tobei, fansite
- Akiji Kobayashi at IMDb
- Yoshimaru, Satoko (November 2010). "Captain Mura Dies at Age 79". Kaiju-Fan Vol. 1, No. 4. p. 5.
