= Love Hotel (1985 film) =

- Film poster
- ラブホテル
- Directed by: Shinji Sōmai
- Written by: Takashi Ishii
- Produced by: Yoshiyuki Kaino
- Starring: Minori Terada; Noriko Hayami
- Cinematography: Tadashi Miura; Katsuji Oyamada; Noboru Shinoda
- Edited by: Isao Tomita
- Production companies: Director's Company; Nikkatsu
- Release date: August 3, 1985 (Japan)
- Running time: 88 minutes
- Country: Japan
- Language: Japanese

Love Hotel (Japanese: ラブホテル, Hepburn: Rabu hoteru) is a 1985 Japanese pink film in Nikkatsu's Roman porno series, directed by Shinji Sōmai and starring Noriko Hayami.

== Synopsis ==
When businessman Tetsuro Muraki has his company go bankrupt and his wife Ryoko is raped by gangsters who use her body to pay off his debts, he succumbs to despair. He hires a prostitute, Nami, to go with him to a love hotel with sex and suicide in mind.

== Cast ==
- Minori Terada (寺田農) as Tetsuro Muraki
- Noriko Hayami as Nami Tsuchiya
- Rie Nakagawa (中川梨絵) as Masayo Ohta
- Kiriko Shimizu (志水季里子) as Ryoko Muraki
- Nobutaka Masutomi (益富信孝) as Kiyoshi Ohta
- Toshinori Omi (尾美としのり) as the Assistant Director
- Kōichi Satō as the Taxi Driver

== Background ==
Although director Shinji Sōmai had worked for Nikkatsu in the 1970s and served as an assistant director, this film marked his only work in the Roman porno genre for Nikkatsu. The film was produced by the Directors's Company (ディレクターズ カンパニー), an association of young directors formed in 1982. The screenplay was the work of Takashi Ishii who would later rework the script for his directorial debut, the 1988 film Angel Guts: Red Vertigo.

== Reception ==
Jawni Han writing for Metrograph called the film a classic of the Roman Porno genre. Beatrice Loayza of The New York Times said that the director's "[...] exquisite visual compositions (of lonely bedrooms, concrete piers, and nocturnal courtyards) infuse even the film’s racy images with a somber sense of longing and introspection, finding beauty and humanity in the midst of the macabre."

== Awards and nominations ==
7th Yokohama Film Festival

- Won: Best Film
- Won: Best Director - Shinji Sōmai
- Won: Best Screenplay - Takashi Ishii
- Won: Best Cinematography - Noboru Shinoda
- Won: Best Actor - Minori Terada

The film also won the Nikkatsu in-house award for Best Film of the Year.
