= The Inugami Family =

1976 Japanese film

- Theatrical poster
- Inugami-ke no Ichizoku (犬神家の一族)
- Directed by: Kon Ichikawa
- Written by: Norio Nagata; Shinya Hidaka; Kon Ichikawa
- Based on: The Inugami Curse by Seishi Yokomizo
- Produced by: Haruki Kadokawa; Kiichi Ichikawa
- Starring: Kōji Ishizaka
- Cinematography: Kiyoshi Hasegawa
- Edited by: Chizuko Osada
- Music by: Yuji Ohno
- Production company: Haruki Kadokawa Office
- Distributed by: Toho
- Release date: October 16, 1976 (Japan)
- Running time: 146 minutes
- Country: Japan
- Language: Japanese

The Inugami Family (Japanese: 犬神家の一族, Hepburn: Inugami-ke no Ichizoku) is a 1976 Japanese mystery film directed by Kon Ichikawa. It is based on the novel The Inugami Curse by Seishi Yokomizo. The film is the first in Kon Ichikawa's and Kōji Ishizaka's Kindaichi Series. The soundtrack is composed by Yuji Ohno. Ichikawa remade the film in 2006 as The Inugamis.

Murders start taking place within the very rich Inugami family in connection to a will left by Sahei Inugami, the family patriarch to Tamayo, an outsider.

== Cast ==
- Kōji Ishizaka as Kosuke Kindaichi
- Yoko Shimada as Tamayo Nonomiya
- Teruhiko Aoi as Sukekiyo Inugami / Shizuma Aonuma
- Mieko Takamine as Matsuko Inugami
- Mitsuko Kusabue as Umeko Inugami
- Ryoko Sakaguchi as Haru
- Takeo Chii as Suketake Inugami
- Akiji Kobayashi as Kôkichi Inugami
- Kyōko Kishida as The Koto Player
- Hideji Ōtaki as Oyama
- Eitaro Ozawa as Kyozo Furudate
- Takeshi Katō as Detective Tachibana
- Rentarō Mikuni as Sahei Inugami

== Awards and nominations ==
1st Hochi Film Award

- Won: Best Film

19th Blue Ribbon Awards

- Won Best Supporting Actress Mieko Takamine

== See also ==
- Queen Bee, the fourth film in Ichikawa and Ishizaka's Kindaichi series.
- Byoinzaka no Kubikukuri no Ie, the fifth film in the series.
