= Kōji Ishizaka =

Japanese actor (born 1941)

- Born: Heikichi Mutō; 20 June 1941 (age 85); Kyōbashi-ku, Tokyo City, Tokyo Prefecture, Japan (now Chūō, Tokyo, Japan)
- Education: Keio University
- Occupation: Actor
- Years active: 1958–present
- Spouse: Ruriko Asaoka (m. 1971; ann. 2000)

Kōji Ishizaka (石坂 浩二, Ishizaka Kōji; born 20 June 1941 in Tokyo as Heikichi Mutō (武藤 兵吉, Mutō Heikichi)) is a Japanese actor.

Ishizaka graduated from Keio University with a B.L. degree. He serves as a special advisor for the Japan Plamodel Industry Association, and on 23 February 2009, he founded Rowguanes, a plastic model enthusiast group for the baby boomers.

He starred as Kosuke Kindaichi in the 1970s series of Kindaichi films.

== Filmography ==
=== Film ===
- Kindaichi series
  - The Inugami Family (1976) – Kosuke Kindaichi
  - The Devil's Ballad (1977) – Kosuke Kindaichi
  - Gokumon-to (1977) – Kosuke Kindaichi
  - Queen Bee (1978) – Kosuke Kindaichi
  - The House of Hanging (1979) – Kosuke Kindaichi
  - The Inugamis (2006) – Kosuke Kindaichi
- The Makioka Sisters (1983) – Teinosuke
- Ohan (1984) – Ohan's husband
- The Return of Godzilla (1984) – A reactor operator
- The Burmese Harp (1985) – Inoue
- Bakumatsu Seishun Graffiti: Ronin Sakamoto Ryōma (1986) – Katsu Kaishū
- Princess from the Moon (1987) – Mikado
- Oracion (1988) – Yoshinaga
- Ultra Q The Movie: Legend of the Stars (1990) – Narrator
- 47 Ronin (1994) – Yanagisawa Yoshiyasu
- Ultraman Cosmos: The First Contact (2001) – Narrator
- Ultraman Cosmos 2: The Blue Planet (2002) – Narrator
- Sinking of Japan (2006) – Prime Minister Yamamoto
- Pokémon: The Rise of Darkrai (2007) – Darkrai (voice)
- Superior Ultraman 8 Brothers (2008) – Narrator
- Suspect X (2008) – A pundit
- Shizumanu Taiyō (2009) – Masayuki Kunimi
- Ultraman Zero: The Revenge of Belial (2010) – Narrator
- Library Wars (2013) – Gen Nishina
- Library Wars: The Last Mission (2015) – Gen Nishina
- Tannisho (2019) – Shinran (voice)
- Mio's Cookbook (2020)
- Zokki (2021)
- The Floor Plan (2024)
- Silence of the Sea (2024) – Shuzo Tamura

=== Television ===
- Taiga drama series
  - Hana no Shōgai (1963)
  - Akō Rōshi (1964)
  - Taikōki (1965) – Ishida Mitsunari
  - Ten to Chi to (1969) – Nagao Kagetora
  - Genroku Taiheiki (1975) – Yanagisawa Yoshiyasu
  - Kusa Moeru (1979) – Minamoto no Yoritomo
  - Tokugawa Ieyasu (1983) – Naya Shōan
  - Hachidai Shōgun Yoshimune (1995) – Manabe Akifusa
  - Genroku Ryōran (1999) – Kira Kōzuke no suke
  - Shinsengumi! (2004) – Sakuma Shōzan
  - Gō (2011) – Sen no Rikyū
  - Unbound (2025) – Matsudaira Takechika
- Ultra Q (1966) – Narrator
- Kurayami Shitomenin (1974) – Itoi Mitsugu
- Sekigahara (1981) – Narrator
- Bakumatsu Seishun Graffiti: Sakamoto Ryōma (1982) – Katsu Kaishū
- Miyamoto Musashi (1984–85) – Hon'ami Kōetsu
- Bakumatsu Seishun Graffiti: Fukuzawa Yukichi (1985) – Katsu Kaishū
- Onna tachi no Hyakuman goku (1988) – Maeda Toshinaga
- Wataru Seken wa Oni Bakari (1990–2015) – Narrator
- Mito Komon (2001–2002) – Tokugawa Mitsukuni
- The Great White Tower (2003) – Professor Azuma
- Furuhata Ninzaburō: Final (2006) – Kyōsuke Tenma
- Clouds Over the Hill (2009–2011) – Yamamoto Gonbei
- Wagaya no Rekishi (2010) – Kafū Nagai
- AIBOU: Tokyo Detective Duo (2012–present) - Mineaki Kai
- Yasuragi no Sato (2017) – Sakae Kikumura
- Rakuen (2017) – Kazuo Kanekawa
- Yasuragi no Toki: Michi (2019–20) – Sakae Kikumura
- The Grand Family (2021) – Finance minister Nagata
- Fixer season 3 (2023)
- Black Forceps (season 2) (2024) as Ryūtarō Shingyōji
