= Koji Chino =

Japanese film director

Kōji Chino is Japanese film director.

== Filmography ==
- Bonta No Kekkon Ya
- Thway (2003)
