= Noriko Hayami =

Japanese actress

- Born: September 20, 1959 (age 65); Tokyo, Japan
- Occupation: Actress

Noriko Hayami (速水 典子, Hayami Noriko) is a Japanese actress most known for played the lead role in the 1985 film Love Hotel. She was also the supporting actress in many additional films.

On television, Noriko was the lead actress in Sora o Tonda Kome Sōba (空を飛んだ米相場), Episode #29 of Abarenbō Shōgun V.

== Filmography ==
- The Geisha (1983)
- Love Hotel (1985)
- House of Wedlock (1986)
- Onibi (1997)
- A Lost Paradise (1997)
- Off-Balance (2001)
