= Kie Nakai =

Japanese actress

- Born: November 27, 1957 (age 68); Tokyo, Japan
- Occupation: Actress
- Relatives: Keiji Sada (father); Kiichi Nakai (younger brother)

Kie Nakai (中井貴惠, Nakai Kie) is a Japanese actress. She won the award for best supporting actress at the 7th Yokohama Film Festival for Kanashii kibun de joke.

== Filmography ==
- Queen Bee (1978)
- Byoinzaka no Kubikukuri no Ie (1979)
- Conquest (1982)
- Theater of Life (1983) as Otoyo
- Hissatsu: Sure Death (1984)
- Kanashii kibun de joke (1985)
- The Empty Table (1985)

== Television ==
- Kawaite sōrō (1984) as Fuki
