= Vampire Moth =

1956 film by Nobuo Nakagawa

Kyuketsuga
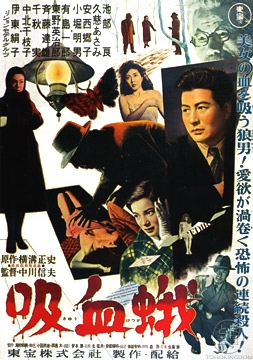
- Japanese theatrical release poster
- Directed by: Nobuo Nakagawa
- Screenplay by: Hideo Oguni; Dai Nishijima
- Based on: Kyuketsuga by Seishi Yokomizo
- Starring: Ryō Ikebe; Asami Kuji; Eijirō Tōno; Kyoko Anzai
- Cinematography: Jun Yasumoto
- Music by: Masaru Sato
- Production company: Toho
- Distributed by: Toho
- Release date: April 11, 1956 (Japan)
- Running time: 92 minutes
- Country: Japan

Vampire Moth (Japanese: 吸血蛾, Hepburn: Kyuketsuga) is a 1956 Japanese film directed by Nobuo Nakagawa. It is based on the novel of the same name by Seishi Yokomizo. The film is about a professional nude model stalked by a bizarre, unknown man wearing a hideous mask. It has been described as the first Japanese vampire film, but in which the creature is revealed not to be supernatural, similar to The Cat and the Canary. Ryō Ikebe stars as the noted detective Kindaichi Kosuke.

== Plot ==
Fumiyo Asabu, a designer who organizes the Asaya association, lived with the genius design painter Ibuki during his stay in France. Discarded and returned to Japan. The design allowed her to earn the prestige of a prestigious designer. When Ibuki came to Japan following Fumiyo, I met Fumiyo's patron Nagaoka and revealed the secret. When Nagaoka bought the rest of the design from Ibuki, he occasionally turned into a phantom and called for Bunyo and sold it for a fortune. Nagaoka wanted to use this method to wake up Fumiyo and stop the false designer life. Ibuki calls for Bunyo to the insect brother of Eto, a twin entomologist and entomologist, and urges him to be reconciled by violence, but is instead killed by Bunyo. Toru Murakoshi, a manager of the Asayakai and a murderer who has a murderous illness, revealed his true nature when he knew of the murder of Bunyo and threatened her to become her own woman. Then, with the luck that no one knew Ibuki's death, Toru, who was transformed into a werewolf Ibuki, committed a brutal crime. In this way, three out of the seven Asaya Kai-only models were killed, and finally Nagaoka. Bunyo was also overwhelmed by Tohru and killed his competitor, Tsuruko Kushita. On the other hand, Eto, who does not know Ibuki's death, thought that the crimes that occurred one after another were the work of his younger brother Ibuki, and hid the three models who were the victims of the next victim, but he also became a werewolf there. Tohru appears and Eto is killed. Toru ordered Fumiyo to bring in a seventh model, Yumiko Sugino, and tried to kill the four models together. Kindaichi Kōsuke, a detective who was chasing a murderer in a crisis, appeared and the four were saved. Bunyo fell to Toru's pistol, and Toru, who fled to the steel frame of the building under construction, crashed and died when a criminal detective appeared as a group of police officers. Yumiko was struck by the lover's newspaper reporter Kawase.

== Release ==
Kyuketsuga was released in Japan on 11 April 1956 where it was distributed by Toho. As of 2008, a release of the film in the United States remained undetermined. A 35mm English subtitled print is held at the Pacific Film Archive.
