= The Inugamis (2006 film) =

2006 Japanese film

- Theatrical poster
- Directed by: Kon Ichikawa
- Written by: Kon Ichikawa; Shin'ya Hidaka; Norio Osada
- Produced by: itto
- Starring: Kōji Ishizaka
- Cinematography: Yukio Isohata
- Release date: 16 December 2006
- Running time: 134 minutes
- Country: Japan
- Language: Japanese

The Inugamis (犬神家の一族, Inugami-ke no ichizoku (a.k.a. Murder of the Inugami Clan)) is a 2006 Japanese drama film written and directed by Kon Ichikawa. It is a remake of his own 1976 film The Inugami Family, and would prove to be Ichikawa's final film. A few minutes' footage of Ichikawa at work directing can be seen in the 2006 documentary The Kon Ichikawa Story. The film was entered into the 29th Moscow International Film Festival.

== Cast ==
- Kōji Ishizaka as Kosuke Kindaichi
- Nanako Matsushima as Tamayo Nonomiya
- Onoe Kikunosuke V as Sukekiyo Inugami / Shizuma Aonuma
- Sumiko Fuji as Matsuko Inugami
- Keiko Matsuzaka as Takeko Inugami
- Hisako Manda as Umeko Inugami
- Shingo Katsurayama as Suketake Inugami
- Mansaku Ikeuchi as Suketomo Inugami
- Yukijiro Hotaru as Kōkichi Inugami
- Toshiya Nagasawa as Saruzō
- Saburo Ishikura as Fujisaki Kanshiki-ka-in
- Isao Bito as Senba Keiji
- Kyoko Fukada as Haru
- Tamao Nakamura
- Mitsuko Kusabue
- Hideji Ōtaki as Ōyama
- Kōki Mitanias Nasu Hotel owner
- Takeshi Katō as Detective Todoroki
- Atsuo Nakamura as Furudate Kyozo
