= Yoichi Takabayashi =

Japanese film director

- Born: 29 April 1931; Kyoto, Japan
- Died: 15 July 2012 (aged 81); Kyoto, Japan
- Occupation: Film director
- Years active: 1959-2012

Yoichi Takabayashi (高林陽一, Takabayashi Yōichi; 29 April 1931 – 15 July 2012) was a Japanese film director.

== Career ==
Born in Kyoto and graduating from Ritsumeikan University, Takabayashi became a pioneering independent filmmaker working in 8mm and 16mm film, earning awards at foreign festivals for his work. His 1970 film Subarashii jōki kikansha was well received and earned him the opportunity to direct theatrical films. The Water Was So Clear won the grand prize at the 1973 Mannheim-Heidelberg International Film Festival. His 1976 film Death at an Old Mansion was entered into the 26th Berlin International Film Festival.

He died on 15 July 2012 of pneumonia at the age of 81.

== Filmography ==
- The Water Was So Clear (餓鬼草紙 Gaki zōshi) (1973)
- Temple of the Golden Pavilion (1976)
- Death at an Old Mansion (1976)
- Lover's Suicide (1977)
- Naomi (1980)
- Za ûman (1980)
- Kura no naka (1981)
- Akai scandal: joji (1982)
- Irezumi: Spirit of Tattoo (1982)
- Koi nakushite (2003)
- Hate e no tabi (2007)
