= Seishi Yokomizo =

Japanese novelist (1902–1981)

- Yokomizo Seishi
- Born: 24 May 1902; Kobe, Hyōgo, Empire of Japan
- Died: 28 December 1981 (aged 79); Toyama, Shinjuku, Tokyo, Japan
- Resting place: Kawasaki, Kanagawa, Japan
- Education: Specialized School
- Alma mater: Osaka Pharmaceutical College
- Occupation: Author
- Writing career
- Language: Japanese
- Period: 1921–1981
- Genre: Mystery fiction
- Notable works: The Honjin Murders; Chōchō Satsujin Jiken; Death on Gokumon Island; The Village of Eight Graves; The Inugami Curse; The Devil's Flute Murders; The Little Sparrow Murders
- Notable awards: Mystery Writers of Japan Award for Best Novel; Order of the Sacred Treasure, Gold Rays with Neck Ribbon

Seishi Yokomizo (Japanese: 横溝 正史, Hepburn: Yokomizo Seishi; 24 May 1902 – 28 December 1981) was a Japanese mystery novelist, known for creating the fictional detective Kosuke Kindaichi.

== Early life ==
Yokomizo was born in the city of Kobe, Hyōgo Prefecture. He read detective stories as a boy and in 1921, while employed by the Daiichi Bank, published his first story in the popular magazine Shin Seinen ("New Youth"). He graduated from Osaka Pharmaceutical College (currently part of Osaka University) with a degree in pharmacy, and initially intended to take over his family's drug store. However, drawn by his interest in literature, and the encouragement of Edogawa Rampo, he went to Tokyo instead. There he was hired by the Hakubunkan publishing company in 1926. After serving as editor in chief of several magazines, he resigned in 1932 to devote himself full time to writing.

== Literary career ==
Yokomizo was attracted to the literary genre of historical fiction, especially that of the historical detective novel. In July 1934, while resting in the mountains of Nagano to recuperate from tuberculosis, he completed his first novel Onibi, which was published in 1935, although parts were immediately censored by the authorities. Undeterred, Yokomizo followed on his early success with a second novel Ningyo Sashichi torimonocho (1938–1939).

During World War II, he faced difficulties in getting his works published and was in severe financial difficulties. The lack of Streptomycin and other antibiotics also meant that his tuberculosis could not be properly treated, and he joked with friends that it was a race to see whether he would die of disease or of starvation.

Soon after the end of World War II, his works received wide recognition and he developed an enormous fan following. He published many works as serials in Kodansha's Weekly Shōnen Magazine, concentrating only on popular mystery novels based on the orthodox western detective story format, starting with Honjin Satsujin Jiken (The Honjin Murders) and Chōchō Satsujin Jiken (both in 1946). His works became the model for many other postwar Japanese mystery writers. He was also often called the "Japanese John Dickson Carr" after a writer whom he admired. Yokomizo is most well known for creating the private detective Kosuke Kindaichi.

Many of his works have been made into movies. In particular, The Inugami Clan (犬神家の一族, Inugamike no Ichizoku; January 1950 - May 1951) received two film adaptations by Kon Ichikawa: The Inugami Family in 1976, and his 2006 remake The Inugamis.

The scholar Mari Kotani called his 1939 story The Death's Head Stranger (髑髏検校, Dokuro-Kengyo) "the first successful adaptation of Bram Stoker's Dracula" and "the archetype of Japanese vampire literature."

Yokomizo died of colon cancer in 1981. His grave is at the Shunjuen Cemetery in Kawasaki, Kanagawa.

In 2018 a literature professor found a previously missing piece of Yokomizo's wartime serial romance story "Yukiwariso," completing the manuscript for publication in book form.

== Legacy ==
The Yokomizo Seishi Prize is a literary award established in 1980 by the Kadokawa Shoten publishing company and the Tokyo Broadcasting System in honor of Yokomizo. It is awarded annually to a previously unpublished novel-length mystery. The winner receives a statuette of Kosuke Kindaichi and a cash award of ¥10,000,000, making it one of the richest literary prizes in the world. In addition, the winning story is published by Kadokawa Shoten and dramatized as a television movie by TBS.

== Selected works ==
=== Works in Japanese ===
- The Honjin Murders (本陣殺人事件, Honjin satsujin jiken; April - December 1946); ISBN 978-4-04-130408-2
- Gokumon Island (獄門島, Gokumontō; January 1947 - October 1948); ISBN 978-4-04-130403-7
- Woman Walking at Night (夜歩く, Yoru aruku; 1948); ISBN 978-4-04-130407-5
- The Village of Eight Graves (八つ墓村, Yatsuhakamura; March 1949 - March 1951); ISBN 978-4-04-130401-3
- The Inugami Clan (犬神家の一族, Inugamike no Ichizoku; January 1950 - May 1951); ISBN 978-4-925080-76-7
- Queen Bee (女王蜂, Jo-o-batchi; June 1951 – May 1952); ISBN 978-4-04-130411-2
- The Sleeping Bride (睡れる花嫁, Nemureru Hanayome; 1952); ISBN 978-4-04-130497-6.
- The Devil Comes and Plays His Flute (悪魔が来りて笛を吹く, Akuma ga kitarite fue o fuku; 1951-1953); ISBN 978-4-04-130404-4
- Three Head Tower (三つ首塔, Mitsu-kubi Tō; 1955); ISBN 978-4-04-130406-8
- Head (首, Kubi; 1957); ISBN 978-4-04-130443-3
- The Tragedy of MaZee Inn (迷路荘の惨劇, Meiro-sō no sangeki); ISBN 978-4-04-130434-1
- The Little Sparrow Murders (悪魔の手毬歌, Akuma no Temari Uta; August 1957 – January 1959); ISBN 978-4-04-130402-0
- Pimple on Human Face (人面瘡, Jin-Men-Sō); ISBN 978-4-04-130497-6
- Masquerade (仮面舞踏会, Kamen-Budō-Kai); ISBN 978-4-04-130438-9
- The House of Hanging on Hospital Slope (病院坂の首縊りの家, Byōin-zaka no kubikukuri no ie; December 1975); ISBN 978-4-04-130461-7; ISBN 978-4-04-130462-4

=== English translations ===
- The Honjin Murders (本陣殺人事件 Honjin satsujin jiken) translated by Louise Heal Kawai. Pushkin Vertigo, 2019; ISBN 9781782275008
- The Inugami Curse (犬神家の一族 Inugamike no ichizoku) translated by Yumiko Yamazaki. ICG Muse, 2003; ISBN 9784925080767. Later published by Stone Bridge Press, 2007; ISBN 9781933330310 and Pushkin Vertigo, 2020; ISBN 9781782275039
- The Village of Eight Graves (八つ墓村 Yatsuhakamura) translated by Bryan Karetnyk. Pushkin Vertigo, 2021; ISBN 9781782277453
- Death on Gokumon Island (獄門島 Gokumontō) translated by Louise Heal Kawai. Pushkin Vertigo, 2022; ISBN 9781782277415
- The Devil's Flute Murders (悪魔が来りて笛を吹く Akuma ga kitarite fue o fuku) translated by Jim Rion. Pushkin Vertigo, 2023; ISBN 9781782278849
- The Little Sparrow Murders (悪魔の手毬唄 Akuma no temari uta) translated by Bryan Karetnyk. Pushkin Vertigo, 2024; ISBN 9781782278870
- Murder at the Black Cat Cafe (黒猫亭事件 Kuronekotei jiken) translated by Bryan Karetnyk. Pushkin Vertigo, 2025; ISBN 9781805335511
- She Walks at Night (夜歩くYoru aruku ) translated by Jesse Kirkwood. Pushkin Vertigo, 2026; ISBN 9781805335580

== See also ==
- Japanese literature
- Japanese detective fiction
- List of Japanese authors
- Vampire Moth
