= Japanese Film Festival =

Film festival in Singapore

Japanese Film Festival Singapore
- Location: Singapore
- Started: May 1, 1983

The Japanese Film Festival (JFF) is a film festival held in Singapore and dedicated to Japanese cinema.

== History ==
Japanese Film Festival was first held in 1983 and then held annually from 1999 to 2016, and curated with Singapore audiences in mind, led by local programmers with a wide-ranging programme of film classics, Japanese independents and commercial releases.

The JFF was established in Singapore in 1983. The festival was organised by the Singapore Film Society and the Japanese Embassy and the films were shown at the Cultural Theatre and Victoria Theatre.

The next JFF was shown in 1986. In 1987, Japanese ambassador to Singapore, Wasuke Miyake, brought JFF to Singapore which was held in October.

During the COVID-19 pandemic in Singapore, the festival turned to hybrid screenings for 2020 and 2021. Since then they have continued to deliver the hybrid model each year using a platform provided by Shift72.

There was no festival in 2017. Under new direction from 2018 from the Japan Foundation in Tokyo, it has shifted its focus to screening mainly commercial releases from Japan.

== 2014 (26 June to 12 July) ==
The Japanese Film Festival was held from 26 June to 12 July at the National Museum of Singapore.

=== Film programme ===
Currents

- Leaving on the 15th Spring / 旅立ちの島唄～十五の春～ (2012) by Yoshida Yasuhiro / 吉田康弘 (PG)
- Homeland / 家路 (2014) by Kubota Nao / 久保田直 (M18)
- Homesick / ホームシック (2012) by Hirohara Satoru / 廣原暁 (PG)
- Maruyama, The Middle Schooler / 中学生円山 (2012) by Kudo Kankuro / 宮藤官九郎 (NC16)
- Survive Style 5+ (2004) by Sekiguchi Gen / 関口現 (NC16)
- The Tale of Iya / 祖谷(いや)物語 おくのひと (2013) by Tsuta Tetsuichiro / 蔦哲一朗 (PG)
- The Mole Song / 土竜の唄 (2013) by Miike Takashi / 三池 崇史 (M18)

Retrospective (Ichikawa Kon)

- Alone Across the Pacific / 太平洋ひとりぼっち (1963) by Ichikawa Kon / 市川 崑 (PG)
- An Actor's Revenge / 雪之丞変化 (1963) by Ichikawa Kon / 市川 崑 (PG)
- Bonchi / ぼんち (1960) by Ichikawa Kon / 市川 崑 (PG)
- Crammed Streetcar / 満員電車 (1957) by Ichikawa Kon / 市川 崑 (PG)
- Hakai / 破戒 (1962) by Ichikawa Kon / 市川 崑 (PG)
- Harp of Burma / ビルマの竪琴 (1956) by Ichikawa Kon / 市川 崑 (PG)
- I Am Two / 私は二歳 (1962) by Ichikawa Kon / 市川 崑 (PG)
- Kokoro / こころ (1955) by Ichikawa Kon / 市川 崑 (PG)
- Nihonbashi / 日本橋 (1956) by Ichikawa Kon / 市川 崑 (PG)
- Nobi / 野火 (1959) by Ichikawa Kon / 市川 崑 (PG)
- Odd Obsession / 鍵 (1959) by Ichikawa Kon / 市川 崑 (PG)
- Punishment Room / 処刑の部屋 (1956) by Ichikawa Kon / 市川 崑 (PG)
- Ten Dark Women / 黒い十人の女 (1961) by Ichikawa Kon / 市川 崑 (PG)
- The Wanderers / 股旅 (1973) by Ichikawa Kon / 市川 崑 (PG13)
- The Makioka Sisters / 細雪 (1983) by Ichikawa Kon / 市川 崑 (PG)

== 2013 (26 June to 8 July) ==
The Japanese Film Festival was held from 26 June to 8 July at the Alliance Francaise and the National Museum of Singapore. There will be a focus on films from the 80s as well as a retrospective on Shindo Kaneto and Yoshimura Kozaburo, in addition to a showcase of the best in Japanese current films.

=== Film programme ===
Around the 80s

- Muddy River / 泥の河 (1981) by Oguri Kohei / 小栗康平 (PG13)
- Mahjong Horoki / 麻雀放浪記 (1984) by Wada Makoto / 和田誠 (NC16)
- I Are You, You Am Me / 転校生 (1982) by Obayashi Nobuhiko / 大林宣彦 (NC16)
- Farewell to the Land / さらば、愛しき大地 (1982) by Yanagimachi Mitsuo / 柳町光男 (R21)
- Violent Cop / その男、凶暴につき (1989) by Kitano Takeshi / 北野武 (M18)
- Rikyu / 利休 (1989) by Teshigahara Hiroshi / 勅使河原宏 (PG)
- Fall Guy / 蒲田行進曲 (1982) by Fukasaku Kinji / 深作欣二 (R21)
- The Catch / 魚影の群れ (1983) by Somai Shinji / 相米慎二 (R21)
- No More Easy Going / もう頬づえはつかない (1979) by Higashi Yoichi / 東陽一 (M18)
- Preparation for the Festival / 祭りの準備 (1975) by Kuroki Kazuo / 黒木和雄 (R21)
- The Man Who Stole the Sun / 太陽を盗んだ男 (1979) by Hasegawa Kazuhiko / 長谷川和彦 (PG)
- The Family Game / 家族ゲーム (1983) by Morita Yoshimitsu / 森田芳光 (NC16)

Retrospective (Shindo Kaneto and Yoshimura Kozaburo)

- A Ball at the Anjo House / 安城家の舞踏会 (1947) by Yoshimura Kozaburo / 吉村公三郎 (PG)
- The Disguise / 偽れる盛装 (1951) by Yoshimura Kozaburo / 吉村公三郎 (PG)
- Sisters of Nishijin / 西陣の姉妹 (1952) by Yoshimura Kozaburo / 吉村公三郎 (PG)
- Undercurrent / 夜の河 (1956) by Yoshimura Kozaburo / 吉村公三郎 (PG)
- Children of Hiroshima / 原爆の子 (1952) by Shindo Kaneto / 新藤兼人 (PG)
- Epitome / 縮図 (1953) by Shindo Kaneto / 新藤兼人 (PG)
- The Ditch / どぶ (1954) by Shindo Kaneto / 新藤兼人 (PG)
- Lucky Dragon No. 5 / 第五福竜丸 (1959) by Shindo Kaneto / 新藤兼人 (PG)
- The Island / 裸の島 (1960) by Shindo Kaneto / 新藤兼人 (PG)
- Mother / 母 (1963) by Shindo Kaneto / 新藤兼人 (PG)
- A Last Note / 午後の遺言状 (1995) by Shindo Kaneto / 新藤兼人 (M18)

Currents

- GFP Bunny / タリウム少女のプログラム (2012) by Tsuchiya Yutaka / 土屋豊 (R21)
- Japan Lies / ニッポンの嘘 報道写真家福島菊次郎90歳 (2012) by Hasegawa Saburo / 長谷川三郎 (M18)
- Japan's Tragedy / 日本の悲劇 (2012) by Masahiro Kobayashi / 小林政広 (PG13)
- Rent a Cat / レンタネコ (2012) by Ogigami Naoko / 荻上直子 (PG)
- Shady / かしこい狗は、吠えずに笑う (2012) by Watanabe Ryohei / 渡部亮平 (NC16)
- See You Tomorrow Everyone / みなさん、さようなら (2013) by Nakamura Yoshihiro / 中村義洋 (NC16)
- Our Homeland / かぞくのくに (2012) by Yang Yong-hi / ヤン・ヨンヒ (NC16)

Undercurrents

- Canary / カナリア (2005) by Shiota Akihiko / 塩田明彦 (M18)
- Villain / 悪人 (2010) by Lee Sang-il / 이상일 (R21)

== 2012 (1 to 8 July) ==
The Japanese Film Festival was held from 2 to 8 July at the National Museum of Singapore. Besides showcasing the best of current Japanese films, one segment of the festival focused on documentaries examining the undercurrents and post-trauma effects of the tsunami in Japan in March 2011, while another segment focused on the celebration of the Nikkatsu Centennial.

=== Film programme ===
Tsunami Documentaries

- Fukushima Memories of a Landscape / 相馬看花 第一部 奪われた土地の記憶 (2011) by Matsubayashi Yojyu / 松林 要樹 (PG)
- No Man's Zone / 無人地帯 (2012) by Fujiwara Toshi / 藤原 敏史 (PG)

Nikkatsu Centennial - Celebrating 100 Years of Nikkatsu Studio

- Stolen Desire / 盗まれた欲情 (1958) by Imamura Shohei / 今村 昌平 (PG)
- Endless Desire / 果てしなき欲望 (1958) by Imamura Shohei / 今村 昌平 (PG)
- Unholy Desire / 赤い殺意 (1964) by Imamura Shohei / 今村 昌平 (PG)
- The Pornographers / エロ事師たちより 人類学入門 (1966) by Imamura Shohei / 今村 昌平 (M18)
- Nishi Ginza Station / 西銀座駅前 (1958) by Imamura Shohei / 今村 昌平 (PG)
- The Insect Woman / にっぽん昆虫記 by Imamura Shohei / 今村 昌平 (PG)
- Juvenile Jungle / 狂った果実 (1956) by Nakahira Kō / 中平 康 (PG)
- Gate of Flesh / 肉体の門 (1964) by Suzuki Seijun / 鈴木 清順 (M18)
- Red Handkerchief / 赤いハンカチ (1964) by Toshio MasudaMasuda Toshio / 舛田 利雄 (PG)
- The Woman with Red Hair / 赫い髪の女 (1979) by Kumashiro Tatsumi / 神代 辰巳 (R21)
- Bakumatsu Taiyoden / 幕末太陽傳 (1957) by Kawashima Yuzo / 川島 雄三 (PG)

Japanese Currents

- Life Back Then / アントキノイノチ (2011) by Zeze Takahisa / 瀬々 敬久 (PG13)
- About the Pink Sky / ももいろそらを (2011) by Kobayashi Keiichi / 小林 啓一 (NC16)
- Death of a Japanese Salesman / エンディングノート (2011) by Sunada Mami / 砂田 麻美 (PG)
- I Wish / 奇跡 (2011) by Koreeda Hirokazu / 是枝 裕和 (PG)
- Tokyo Oasis / 東京オアシス (2011) by Matsumoto Kana / 松本 佳奈 and Nakamura Kayo / 中村 佳代 (PG)
- Chronicle of My Mother / わが母の記 (2011) by Harada Masato / 原田 眞人 (PG)

== 2011 (2 to 10 July) ==
The Japanese Film Festival was held from 2 to 10 July at the National Museum of Singapore. The festival theme was Journey.

=== Festival highlights (Journey) ===
Opening Film:

- Mother Water / マザーウォーター (2010) by Matsumoto Kana / 松本 佳奈 (PG)

Closing Film:

- Sketches of Kaitan City / 海炭市叙景 (2010) by Kumakiri Kazuyoshi / 熊切 和嘉 (PG)

Director in attendance:

- Kumakiri Kazuyoshi / 熊切 和嘉

=== Film programme ===
Tribute to Takamine Hideko / 高峰 秀子

- Hideko the Bus Conductress / 秀子の車掌さん (1941) by Naruse Mikio / 成瀬 巳喜男 (PG)
- Lightning / 稲妻 (1952) by Naruse Mikio / 成瀬 巳喜男 (PG)
- Yearning / 乱れる (1964) by Naruse Mikio / 成瀬 巳喜男 (PG)
- When a Woman Ascends the Stairs / 女が階段を上る時 (1960) by Naruse Mikio / 成瀬 巳喜男 (PG)
- The Munekata Sisters / 宗方姉妹 (1950) by Ozu Yasujirō / 小津 安二郎 (PG)
- Immortal Love / 永遠の人 (1961) by Kinoshita Keisuke / 木下 恵介 (PG)

Focus on Gosho Heinosuke / 五所 平之助

- The Young Women of Izu / 伊豆の娘たち (1945) by Gosho Heinosuke / 五所 平之助 (PG)
- Where Chimneys Are Seen / 煙突の見える場所 (1953) by Gosho Heinosuke / 五所 平之助 (PG)
- Woman of the Mist / 朧夜の女 (1936) by Gosho Heinosuke / 五所 平之助 (PG)

Focus on Kumakiri Kazuyoshi / 熊切 和嘉

- Sketches of Kaitan City / 海炭市叙景 (2010) by Kumakiri Kazuyoshi / 熊切 和嘉 (PG)
- Antenna / アンテナ (2004) by Kumakiri Kazuyoshi / 熊切 和嘉 (R21)
- Green Mind, Metal Bats / 青春☆金属バット (2006) by Kumakiri Kazuyoshi / 熊切 和嘉 (M18)

Japanese Currents

- Mother Water / マザーウォーター (2010) by Matsumoto Kana / 松本 佳奈 (PG)
- Strawberry Shortcakes / ストロベリーショートケイクス (2006) by Yazaki Hitoshi / 矢崎 仁司 (R21)
- Birthright / 臍帯 (2010) by Hashimoto Naoki / 橋本 直樹 (PG)
- Megane / めがね (2007) by Ogigami Naoko / 荻上 直子 (PG)
- Kamome Diner / かもめ食堂 (2005) by Ogigami Naoko / 荻上直子 (PG)
- The Days After / 後の日 (2010) by Koreeda Hirokazu / 是枝 裕和 (PG)
- Pool / プール (2009) by Omori Mika / 大森 美香 (PG)

Others

- Till We Meet Again / また逢う日まで (1950) by Imai Tadashi / 今井 正 (PG)
- The Straits of Hunger / 飢餓海峡 (1964) by Uchida Tomu / 内田 吐夢 (PG)

== 2010 (19 to 29 August) ==
In 2010, the Japanese Film Festival was held from 19 to 29 August at the National Museum of Singapore. The festival theme was Youth.

=== Festival Highlights (Youth) ===
Opening Film:

- Boy / 少年 (1969) by Ōshima Nagisa / 大島 渚 (PG)

Closing Film:

- Sweet Little Lies / スイートリトルライズ (2010) by Yazaki Hitoshi / 矢崎仁司 (NC16)

Director in focus: Ōshima Nagisa / 大島 渚
Director in attendance:

- Yoshida Kota / 吉田浩太

=== Film Programme ===
Focus on Japanese New Wave and Oshima Nagisa

- Boy / 少年 (1969) by Ōshima Nagisa / 大島 渚 (PG)
- Diary of a Shinjuku Thief / 新宿泥棒日記 (1968) by Ōshima Nagisa / 大島 渚 (R21)
- Sinner in Paradise / 帰って来たヨッパライ (1968) by Ōshima Nagisa / 大島 渚 (NC16)
- Sing a Song of Sex / 日本春歌考 (1967) by Ōshima Nagisa / 大島 渚 (NC16)
- Good for Nothing / ろくでなし (1960) by Yoshida Yoshishige / 吉田喜重 (PG)
- Bloody Thirst / 血は乾いてる (1960) by Yoshida Yoshishige / 吉田喜重 (PG)
- Hogs and Warships / 豚と軍艦 (1961) by Imamura Shohei / 今村 昌平 (PG)
- A Man Vanishes / 人間蒸発 (1967) by Imamura Shohei / 今村 昌平 (PG)
- A Flame at the Pier / 涙を、獅子のたて髪に (1962) by Shinoda Masahiro / 篠田 正浩 (PG)
- Ototo / おとうと (1960) by Ichikawa Kon / 市川崑 (PG)

Focus on PIA Film Festival

- A Stranger of Mine / 運命じゃない人 (2004) by Uchida Kenji / 内田けんじ (PG)
- Water Flower / 水の花 (2005) by Kinoshita Yusuke / 木下雄介 (PG)
- Fourteen / 14歳 (2006) by Hirosue Hiromasa / 廣末哲万 (PG)
- ASYL - Park and Love Hotel / パーク アンド ラブホテル (2007) by Kumasaka Izuru / 熊坂出 (PG)
- MIME-MIME / マイム マイム (2008) by Sode Yukiko / 岨手由貴子 (M18)

Directions – Focus on NDJC 2007

- The Bus to Heaven (2007) by Gunjigake Masayuki (PG)
- Good bye, George Adamski (2007) by Kodama Kazuto (PG)
- Seismic Girl (2007) by Tatenai Kenta (PG)
- Babin (2007) by Hirabayashi Isamu (PG)
- Restaurant UFO (2007) by Yamaguchi Satoshi (PG)

Directions – Focus on NDJC 2008

- A Lying Woman's Daybreak (2008) by Kumagai Madoka (PG)
- Bloom (2008) by Tanaka Tomofumi (PG)
- The Sparkling Amber (2008) by Nakako Ryota (PG)
- Kudan (2008) by Yoshii Kazuyuki (PG)
- The Third Skin (2008) by Wajima Kotaro (PG)

Japanese Currents

- Air Doll / 空気人形 (2009) by Koreeda Hirokazu / 是枝裕和 (R21)
- Bare Essence of Life / ウルトラミラクルラブストーリー (2009) by Yokohama Satoko / 横浜聡子 (PG)
- Fish Story / フィッシュストーリー (2009) by Nakamura Yoshihiro / 中村義洋 (PG)
- LALAPIPO - A Lot of People / ララピポ (2009) by Miyano Masayuki / 宮野 雅之 (R21)
- Live Tape / ライブテープ (2009) by Matsue Tetsuaki / 松江哲明 (PG)
- Yuriko's Aroma / ユリ子のアロマ (2010) by Yoshida Kota / 吉田浩太 (M18)

== 2009 (25 to 30 August) ==
The Japanese Film Festival 2009 was a showcase of some of the finest in Japanese horror, mystery and supernatural cinema that year. The festival was held from 25 to 30 August at the National Museum of Singapore.

=== Festival Highlights (Horror) ===
Audience Award:

- Strange Circus / 奇妙なサーカス (2006) by Sono Shion / 園 子温 (R21)

=== Film Programme ===
- House / ハウス (1977) by Obayashi Nobuhiko / 大林 宣彦 (NC16)
- The Blind Beast / 盲獣 (1969) by Masumura Yasuzo / 増村 保造 (R21)
- Manji / 卍 (1964) by Masumura Yasuzo / 増村 保造 (R21)
- Onibaba / 鬼婆 (1964) by Shindo Kaneto / 新藤 兼人 (M18)
- The Ghost Story of Yotsuya / 東海道四谷怪談 (1959) by Nakagawa Nobuo / 中川 信夫 (PG)
- Kichiku: Banquet of the Beasts / 鬼畜大宴会 (1997) by Kumakiri Kazuyoshi (R21)
- Strange Circus / 奇妙なサーカス (2006) by Sono Shion / 園 子温 (R21)
- Rampo Noir / 乱歩地獄 (2005) by Jissoji Akio / 実相寺昭雄, Kaneko Atsushi, Sato Hisayasu / 佐藤寿保 and Takeuchi Suguru (R21)
- A Snake of June / 六月の蛇 (2003) by Tsukamoto Shinya / 塚本晋也 (R21)

== 2008 (22 to 31 August) ==
In 2008, the Japanese Film Festival was held from 22 to 31 August 2008 at the National Museum of Singapore, and was a pre-event of the Japan Creative Centre, which was launched in mid November 2009. The festival theme focused on femininity in Japanese Cinema, as exemplified by the festival theme: "Jyo-yuu" (女 優). The festival showcased works by Master director Naruse Mikio and acclaimed actress-director Tanaka Kinuyo. Works of award-winning young director Kawase Naomi and two other independent directors of the current indie movement Matsuoka Naomi and Matsue Tetsuaki were also featured.

=== Festival highlights ("Jyo-yuu" 女優) ===
Director in focus: Naruse Mikio / 成瀬 巳喜男
Directors in attendance:

- Kawase Naomi / 河瀨 直美
- Matsuoka Naomi
- Matsue Tetsuaki

=== Film programme ===
Free-Admission Component

- Sansho the Bailiff / 山椒大夫 (1954) by Mizoguchi Kenji / 溝口 健二 (PG)
- Ginza Cosmetics / 銀座化粧 (1951) by Naruse Mikio / 成瀬 巳喜男 (PG)
- Mother / おかあさん(1952) by Naruse Mikio / 成瀬 巳喜男 (PG)
- A Wanderer's Notebook / 放浪記 (1962) by Naruse Mikio / 成瀬 巳喜男 (PG)
- Floating Clouds / 浮雲 (1955) by Naruse Mikio / 成瀬 巳喜男 (PG)
- Love Letter / 恋文 (1953) by Tanaka Kinuyo / 田中 絹代 (PG)
- The Eternal Breasts / 乳房よ永遠なれ (1955) by Tanaka Kinuyo / 田中 絹代 (NC16)
- A Hen in the Wind / 風の中の雌鳥 (1948) by Ozu Yasujirō / 小津 安二郎 (PG)
- Actress / 映画女優 (1987) by Ichikawa Kon / 市川崑 (PG)
- Harmful Insect / 害虫 (2001) by Shiota Akihiko (PG)
- The Milk Woman / いつか読書する日 (2005) by Ogata Akira (PG)

Paid Screenings Component

- Shara / 沙羅双樹 (2003) by Kawase Naomi / 河瀨 直美 (PG)
- The Mourning Forest / 殯の森 (2007) by Kawase Naomi / 河瀨 直美 (PG)
- Shadow of Sand / 砂の影 (2008) by Kaida Yusuke (PG)
- Katatsumori / かたつもり (1994) by Kawase Naomi / 河瀨 直美 (PG)
- See Heaven / 天、見たけ (1995) by Kawase Naomi / 河瀨 直美 (PG)
- The Setting Sun / 陽は傾ぶき (1996) by Kawase Naomi / 河瀨 直美 (PG)
- Broken Blossom / 花の鼓 (2003) by Matsuoka Naomi (R21)
- Pathos / 背骨のパトス (2008) by Matsuoka Naomi (R21)
- Birth / Mother / 垂乳女 (2006) by Kawase Naomi / 河瀨 直美 (R21)
- Summer Vacation with Naomi Kawase / 2002年の夏休み ドキュメント沙羅双樹 (2003) by Matsue Tetsuaki (PG)
- Every Japanese Woman Makes Her Own Curry / カレーライスの女たち (2003) by Matsue Tetsuaki (PG)
- Embracing / につつまれて (1992) by Kawase Naomi / 河瀨 直美 (PG)
- Sky, Wind, Fire, Water, Earth / きゃからばあ (2001) by Kawase Naomi / 河瀨 直美 (PG)
- Sakuran / さくらん (2006) by Ninagawa Mika / 蜷川 実花 (R21)

== 2007 (15 to 23 September) ==
The 2007 festival theme was True. Romance and the festival was held at the National Museum of Singapore.

=== Festival Highlights (True.Romance) ===
Director in focus: Imamura Shohei / 今村 昌平
Director in attendance:

- Ichikawa Jun / 市川 準

Actress in attendance:

- Yoshiyuki Kazuko

=== Film Programme ===
Imamura Shohei Retrospective

- Black Rain / 黒い雨 (1989) by Imamura Shohei / 今村 昌平
- The Ballad of Narayama / 楢山節考 (1983) by Imamura Shohei / 今村 昌平
- Vengeance Is Mine / 復讐するは我にあり (1979) by Imamura Shohei / 今村 昌平
- Eejanaika / ええじゃないか (1981) by Imamura Shohei / 今村 昌平
- Nianchan / にあんちゃん (1959) by Imamura Shohei / 今村 昌平

Ichikawa Jun Showcase

- Dying at a Hospital (1993) by Ichikawa Jun / 市川 準
- Tokyo Marigold (2001) by Ichikawa Jun / 市川 準
- How to Become Myself (2007) by Ichikawa Jun / 市川 準

Other films

- Inochi / 命 (2002) by Shinohara Tetsuo / 篠原 哲雄
- The Sting of Death / Shi no toge (1990) by Oguri Kohei / 小栗 康平
- The Strange Tale of Oyuki / Bokuto Kidan (1992) by Shindo Kaneto / 新藤 兼人
- Faraway Sunset / Toki rakujitsu (1992) by Koyama Seijiro
- Hachikō Monogatari / ハチ公物語 (1987) by Koyama Seijiro
- Lost in the Wilderness / 植村直己物語 (1986) by Sato Junya / 佐藤 純彌
- Appassionata / Jo no mai by Nakajima Sadao
- Oriume by Matsui Hisako
- Gabai Granny / 佐賀のがばいばあちゃん (2006) by Kurauchi Hitoshi
- Life Can Be So Wonderful / Sekai wa tokidoki utsukushii (2007) by Minorikawa Osamu
- Moon and Cherry / Tsuki to Cherry (2004) by Tanada Yuki
- Abduction: The Megumi Yokota Story / Megumi hikisakareta kazoku no sanjyuunen (2006) by Patty Kim and Chris Sheridan

== 2006 (21 to 29 October) ==
Friendship was the theme of the 2006 Japanese Film Festival.

=== Festival Highlights (Friendship) ===
Director in focus Kitano Takeshi / 北野 武
Director in attendance:

- Ogigami Naoko

=== Film Programme ===
Kitano Takeshi Retrospective

- Kids Return / キッズ・リターン (1996) by Kitano Takeshi / 北野 武
- Fireworks / はなび (1997) by Kitano Takeshi / 北野 武
- Kikujiro / 菊次郎の夏 (1999) by Kitano Takeshi / 北野 武

Ogigami Naoko Showcase

- Yoshino's Barber Shop by Ogigami Naoko
- Kamome Diner / Kamome Shokudo by Ogigami Naoko

Other films

- Final Fantasy VII Advent Children / ファイナルファンタジーVII アドベントチルドレン (2005) by Nomura Tetsuya / 野村 哲也 and Nozue Takeshi
- Captain Harlock in Arcadia / わが青春のアルカディア (1982) by Katsumata Tomoharu / 勝間田具治
- Robocon (2003) by Furumaya Tomoyuki
- A Class to Remember / 学校 (1993) by Yamada Yoji / 山田 洋次
- A Class to Remember II (also known as The Learning Circle) / 学校 II (1996) by Yamada Yoji / 山田 洋次
- A Class to Remember IV (also known as Fifteen) / 学校 IV (2000) by Yamada Yoji / 山田 洋次
- Scarred Angels / Kizu Darake no Tenshi (1997) by Sakamoto Junji / 阪本 順治
- Free and Easy Special Version / 釣りバカ日誌 (1994) by Morisaki Azuma / 森崎 東
- Dixieland Daimyo / Jazz Daimyo (1986) by Okamoto Kihachi / 岡本 喜八
- The All-Out Nine-Field of Nightmares / Gyakkyo Nine (2005) by Hasumi Eiichiro
- We Shall Overcome Someday / Pacchigi! (2004) by Izutsu Kazuyuki / 井筒和幸
- The Professor and His Beloved Equation / 博士の愛した数式 (2006) by Koizumi Takashi / 小泉堯史
- Dead Run / Shisso (2005) by Sabu / サブ
- Linda Linda Linda (2005) by Yamashita Nobuhiro / 山下敦弘

== 2005 (28 September to 9 October) ==
Adaptations was the theme of the 2005 Japanese Film Festival.

=== Festival Highlights (Adaptations) ===
Directors in focus:

- Nomura Yoshitaro / 野村芳太郎
- Ichikawa Kon / 市川崑

=== Film Programme ===
Nomura Yoshitaro Retrospective

- Zero Focus / ゼロの焦点 (1961) by Nomura Yoshitaro / 野村芳太郎
- Castle of Sand / 砂の器 (1974) by Nomura Yoshitaro / 野村芳太郎
- The Incident / 事件 (1978) by Nomura Yoshitaro / 野村芳太郎

Ichikawa Kon Retrospective

- Conflagration/ 炎上 (1958) by Ichikawa Kon / 市川崑
- I Am a Cat / 吾輩は猫である (1975) by Ichikawa Kon / 市川崑
- The Phoenix / Hi no Tori (1978) by Ichikawa Kon / 市川崑
- The Makioka Sisters / 細雪 (1983) by Ichikawa Kon / 市川崑

Other films

- Tony Takitani / トニー滝谷 (2004) by Ichikawa Jun / 市川 準
- The Laughing Frog / 笑う蛙 (2002) by Hirayama Hideyuki / 平山秀幸
- L'Amant (2004) by Hiroki Ryuichi / 廣木 隆
- Josee, the Tiger and the Fish / Joze to Tora to Sakana Tachi (2003) by Inudo Isshin
- Letter from the Mountain / 阿弥陀堂だより (2002) by Koizumi Takashi / 小泉堯史
- The Tragedy of W / Wの悲劇 (1984) by Sawai Shinichiro / 澤井信一郎
- And Then / それから (1985) by Morita Yoshimitsu / 森田 芳光
- When the Rain Lifts / 雨あがる (1999) by Koizumi Takashi / 小泉堯史
- Poppoya - Railroad Man / 鉄道員 (1999) by Furuhata Yasuo / 降旗康男

== 2004 (24 September to 3 October) ==
Tokyo Stories was the theme of the 2004 Japanese Film Festival.

=== Festival Highlights (Tokyo Stories) ===
Directors in focus:

- Yamada Yoji / 山田 洋次
- Ichikawa Jun / 市川 準

=== Film Programme ===
Yamada Yoji Retrospective

- It's Tough Being a Man / 男はつらいよ (1969) by Yamada Yoji / 山田 洋次
- Tora-san's Sunrise and Sunset / 男はつらいよ 寅次郎夕焼け小焼け (1976) by Yamada Yoji / 山田 洋次
- The Yellow Handkerchief / 幸福の黄色いハンカチ (1977) by Yamada Yoji / 山田 洋次
- My Sons / 息子 (1991) by Yamada Yoji / 山田 洋次

Ichikawa Jun Retrospective

- BU.SU (1987) by Ichikawa Jun / 市川 準
- Tsugumi (1990) by Ichikawa Jun / 市川 準
- Tadon and Chikuwa (1998) by Ichikawa Jun / 市川 準
- Osaka Story / Osaka Monogatari (1999) by Ichikawa Jun / 市川 準

Other films

- Tokyo Drifter / 東京流れ者 (1966) by Suzuki Seijun / 鈴木 清順
- Scoutman / ペイン (2000) by Masato Ishioka
- Edo Porn / 北斎漫画 (1981) by Shindo Kaneto / 新藤 兼人
- The Taste of Tea / 茶の味 (2004) by Ishii Katsuhito / 石井 克人

== 2003 (26 September to 5 October) ==
=== Festival highlights (Commemoration - Ozu Yasujiro) ===
Director in focus: Fukasaku Kinji / 深作 欣二
Commemoration: 100th birthday and 40th death anniversary of Ozu Yasujiro / 小津 安二郎

=== Film programme ===
Fukasaku Kinji Retrospective

- Lovers Lost / 道頓堀川 (1982) by Fukasaku Kinji / 深作 欣二
- The Geisha House / おもちゃ (1999) by Fukasaku Kinji / 深作 欣二
- Amateur Singing Contest / Nodo jiman (1999) by Izutsu Kazuyuki / 井筒和幸

Ozu Yasujiro (Commemoration)

- I Was Born, But... / 大人の見る繪本 生れてはみたけれど (1932) by Ozu Yasujiro / 小津 安二郎
- Late Spring / 晩春 (1949) by Ozu Yasujiro / 小津 安二郎
- Tokyo Story / 東京物語 (1953) by Ozu Yasujiro / 小津 安二郎
- Equinox Flower / 彼岸花 (1958) by Ozu Yasujiro / 小津 安二郎
- The End of Summer / 小早川家の秋 (1961) by Ozu Yasujiro / 小津 安二郎
- An Autumn Afternoon / 秋刀魚の味 (1962) by Ozu Yasujiro / 小津 安二郎
- Tokyo-Ga (1985 documentary) by Wim Wenders

Other films

- Twilight Samurai / たそがれ清兵衛 (2002) by Yamada Yoji / 山田 洋次
- Moonlight Whispers / Gekko no Sasayaki (1999) by Shiota Akihiko / 塩田 明彦
- Millennium Actress / 千年女優 (2001) by Kon Satoshi / 今 敏

== 2002 (11 to 20 October) ==
=== Film programme ===
- Lightning / 稲妻 (1952) by Naruse Mikio / 成瀬 巳喜男
- Flowing / 流れる (1956) by Naruse Mikio / 成瀬 巳喜男
- Ugetsu / 雨月物語 (1953) by Mizoguchi Kenji / 溝口 健二
- Juvenile / ジュブナイル (2000) by Takashi Yamazaki / 山崎 貴
- First Love / Hatsukoi (2000) by Shinohara Tetsuo / 篠原 哲雄
- Fifteen / 学校 IV (2000) by Yamada Yoji / 山田 洋次
- Ozamu Tezuka's Anime by Tezuka Osamu / 手塚 治虫 - Jumping (1984) / Pictures At An Exhibition (1966) / Broken Down Film (1985)

== 2001 (29 September to 7 October) ==
=== Festival highlights (Kurosawa Retrospective) ===
Director in focus: Kurosawa Akira / 黒澤 明

=== Film programme ===
Kurosawa Retrospective

- The Bad Sleep Well / 悪い奴ほどよく眠る (1960) by Kurosawa Akira / 黒澤 明
- The Quiet Duel / 静かなる決闘 (1949) by Kurosawa Akira / 黒澤 明
- Red Beard / 赤ひげ (1965) by Kurosawa Akira / 黒澤 明
- Not Yet / まあだだよ (1993) by Kurosawa Akira / 黒澤 明
- Sanjuro / 椿三十郎 (1962) by Kurosawa Akira / 黒澤 明
- Doomed (To Live) / 生きる (1952) by Kurosawa Akira / 黒澤 明

Other films

- Nowhere Man / Muno no Hito (1991) by Takenaka Naoto / 竹中 直人
- Beijing Watermelon (1989) by Obayashi Nobuhiko / 大林宣彦
- Tora-san Takes a Vacation / 男はつらいよ 寅次郎の休日 (1990) by Yamada Yoji / 山田 洋次
- Kikujiro / 菊次郎の夏 (1999) by Kitano Takeshi / 北野 武
- Adrenaline Drive (1999) by Yaguchi Shinobu / 矢口史靖
- Don't Look Back / Doko Made Mo Ikou by Shiota Akihiko
- Nabbie's Love / ナビィの恋 (1999) by Nakane Yuji / 中江裕司

== 2000 (7 to 15 October) ==
=== Festival highlights (Mizoguchi Retrospective) ===
Director in focus: Mizoguchi Kenji / 溝口 健二

=== Film programme ===
Mizoguchi Retrospective

- Ugetsu / 雨月物語 (1953) by Mizoguchi Kenji / 溝口 健二
- Sansho the Bailiff / 山椒大夫 (1954) by Mizoguchi Kenji / 溝口 健二
- The Taira Clan Saga / 新平家物語 (1955) by Mizoguchi Kenji / 溝口 健二
- Street of Shame / 赤線地帯 (1956) by Mizoguchi Kenji / 溝口 健二

Other films

- Wait and See / あ、春 (1998) by Sōmai Shinji / 相米 慎二
- Amateur Singing Contest / のど自慢 (1999) by Izutsu Kazuyuki / 井筒 和幸
- Give It All / がんばっていきまっしょい (1998) by Isomura Itsumichi / 磯村 一路
- The Makioka Sisters / 細雪 (1983) by Ichikawa Kon / 市川 崑
- Muddy River / 泥の河 (1981) by Oguri Kōhei / 小栗 康平
- Take Me out to the Snowland / 私をスキーに連れてって (1987) by Baba Yasuo / 馬場 康夫
- Free & Easy Special Version / 釣りバカ日誌スペシャル (1994) by Morisaki Azuma / 森崎 東
- Tora-san, My Uncle / 男はつらいよ ぼくの伯父さん (1990) by Yamada Yoji / 山田 洋次
- The Terrible Couple / 翔んだカップル (1980) by Sōmai Shinji / 相米 慎二
- Diary of Early Winter Shower / 時雨の記 (1998) by Sawai Shinichiro / 澤井 信一郎
- Memories of You / ラブストーリーを君に (1988) by Sawai Shinichiro / 澤井 信一郎

== 1999 ==
=== Film programme ===
- Magnitude / マグニチュード (1998) by Sugawara Hiroshi / 菅原 浩志
- Bloom in the Moonlight / わが愛の譜 滝廉太郎物語 (1993) by Sawai Shinichiro / 澤井 信一郎
- Children of the Island / 二十四の瞳 (1997) by Asama Yoshitaka / 朝間 義隆
- Faraway Sunset / 遠き落日 (1992) by Koyama Seijiro / 神山 征二郎
- Haunted School / 学校の怪談 (1995) by Hirayama Hideyuki / 平山 秀幸
- Kids Return / キッズ リターン (1996) by Kitano Takeshi / 北野 武
- Love Suicide at Sonezaki / 曽根崎心中 (1981) by Midori Kurisaki / 栗崎 碧
- MacArthur's Children / 瀬戸内少年野球団 (1984) by Shinoda Masahiro / 篠田 正浩
- Many Happy Returns / 教祖誕生 (1993) by Toshihiro Tenma / 天満 敏広
- Musashino High Voltage Towers / 鉄塔武蔵野線 (1997) by Nagao Naoki / 長尾 直樹
- My Secret Cache / ひみつの花園 (1997) by Yaguchi Shinobu / 矢口 史靖
- A Scene at the Sea / あの夏、いちばん静かな海。 (1991) by Kitano Takeshi / 北野 武
- Takeshi: Childhood Days / 少年時代 (1990) by Shinoda Masahiro / 篠田 正浩
- The Wild Daisy / 野菊の墓 (1981) by Sawai Shinichiro / 澤井 信一郎

== Audience Award winners ==
Year	Film	Director	Country of origin
2012	About the Pink Sky / ももいろそらを	Kobayashi Keiichi / 小林 啓一	Japan
2010	Fish Story / フィッシュストーリー	Nakamura Yoshihiro / 中村義洋	Japan
2009	Strange Circus / 奇妙なサーカス	Sono Shion / 園 子温	Japan
