= The Heart (1955 film) =

1955 Japanese film

- Theatrical poster
- Directed by: Kon Ichikawa
- Written by: Keiji Hasebe; Katsuhito Inomata
- Based on: Kokoro by Natsume Sōseki
- Produced by: Masayuki Takagi
- Starring: Masayuki Mori; Michiyo Aratama
- Cinematography: Takeo Ito; Kumenobu Fujioka
- Edited by: Masanori Tsujii
- Music by: Masao Ōki
- Production company: Nikkatsu
- Distributed by: Nikkatsu
- Release date: 31 August 1955 (Japan)
- Running time: 122 minutes
- Country: Japan
- Language: Japanese

The Heart (こころ, Kokoro) is a 1955 Japanese drama film directed by Kon Ichikawa. It is based on the 1914 novel Kokoro by Natsume Sōseki.

== Plot ==
During the late Meiji era, student Hioki befriends an elder man, Nobuchi, and his wife Shizu, who live a reclusive life in their Tokyo home. A shadow of the past hangs over the childless couple in the shape of a long deceased friend, Kaji, whose grave Nobuchi regularly visits. Hioki sees Nobuchi as his tutor and addresses him as "Sensei" (transl. "master" or "teacher"). Nobuchi slowly opens up to the young man, explaining his distrust in people with his relatives' past attempt to withhold him of his share of his parents' inheritance.

After graduating, Hioki travels back to his hometown in the countryside, where his father is in a critical condition. Prompted by his mother, Hioki writes to Nobuchi to help him find a job. At the same time, Emperor Meiji falls ill and dies. Nobuchi asks Hioki to return to Tokyo, but Hioki declines because of his father's deteriorating health. Nobuchi then writes a long letter to Hioki, his "testament", in which he recounts his friendship to fellow student Kaji, which he ultimately betrayed over their mutual love for Shizu, resulting in Kaji's suicide. In the same letter, Nobuchi announces that he will take his own life. Hioki hurries to Nobuchi's home, only to learn that Nobuchi has already died.

== Cast ==
- Masayuki Mori – Nobuchi, called "Sensei"
- Michiyo Aratama – Shizu, Nobuchi's wife
- Tatsuya Mihashi – Kaji
- Shōji Yasui – Hioki
- Tanie Kitabayashi – Hioki's mother
- Akiko Tamura – Widow
- Mutsuhiko Tsurumaru – Hioki's father
- Tsutomu Shimomoto – Hioki's elder brother
- Masami Shimojō – Broker
- Akira Hisamatsu – Travelling monk
- Tomoko Naraoka – Kume
- Zenji Yamada – Nobuchi's uncle
- Keiji Itami – Kaji's father
- Kiyoshi Kamoda – Doctor

== Book and film ==
The film makes some alterations to the book, including the reordering of the plot, giving names to the novel's mostly anonymous characters (Nobuchi is solely addressed as "Sensei" in the book, and Kaji as "K"), and the emphasising of a possible homoerotic element in the relationships Nobuchi–Kaji and Nobuchi–Hioki.
