= Fires on the Plain (novel) =

1951 novel by Shōhei Ōoka

- Author: Ōoka Shōhei
- Original title: Nobi
- Translator: Ivan Morris
- Language: Japanese, English (translated)
- Genre: War novel
- Publisher: Secker & Warburg (UK); Alfred A. Knopf (US)
- Publication date: 1951
- Publication place: Japan
- English publication date: 1957
- Media type: Print
- Pages: 246
- Awards: Yomiuri Prize
- ISBN: 0-8048-1379-5
- Dewey Decimal: 895.63
- LC Class: PZ4.O575 Fi2

Fires on the Plain (Japanese: 野火 Nobi) is a Yomiuri Prize-winning novel by Ooka Shohei, published in 1951. It describes the experiences of an Imperial Japanese Army soldier in the Philippines, as part of the Battle of Leyte and the Battle of Ormoc Bay, at the end of 1944, towards the final months of World War II.

== Summary ==
The story is told through the eyes of a Private Tamura who, after being thrown out by his own company due to illness, chooses to desert the military altogether and wanders aimlessly through the Philippine jungle during the Allied campaign. Descending into delirium, Tamura is forced to confront nature, his childhood faith, hunger, his own mortality, and in the end, cannibalism.

== Literary significance and criticism ==
The book received the Yomiuri Prize. It is perhaps the best-known of Ooka's work among English readers. An English language translation by Ivan Morris was completed in 1957. David C. Stahl has noted that Morris expunged sections where the narrator makes clear that he is manipulating the memoir.

Morris, writing in his introduction in the 1957 English version that he translated, praised the book as one of the most "powerful accounts of the obscenity of war that has ever been written". In his view, the only other comparable novels of the Second World War, published up to that time (1957), were Stalingrad by Theodor Plievier (1948) and Look Down in Mercy by Walter Baxter (1951).

The book was made into a film of the same name in 1959, directed by Kon Ichikawa and starring Eiji Funakoshi. A 2014 adaptation was directed by Shinya Tsukamoto.
