= Fires on the Plain =

Fires on the Plain can refer to:

- Fires on the Plain (novel), a 1951 Japanese novel by Ooka Shohei
- Fires on the Plain (1959 film), a 1959 Japanese film
- Fires on the Plain (2014 film), a 2014 Japanese film

== See also ==
- Wildfire on the plains
- Slash-and-burn agriculture on the plain
