= An Actor's Revenge =

1963 Japanese film by Kon Ichikawa

- Theatrical poster
- Directed by: Kon Ichikawa
- Written by: Natto Wada; Otokichi Mikami
- Produced by: Masaichi Nagata
- Starring: Kazuo Hasegawa; Fujiko Yamamoto
- Cinematography: Setsuo Kobayashi
- Edited by: Shigeo Nishida
- Music by: Tamekichi Mochizuki; Masao Yagi
- Production company: Daiei Film
- Distributed by: Daiei Film
- Release date: 13 January 1963 (Japan)
- Running time: 113 minutes
- Country: Japan
- Language: Japanese

An Actor's Revenge (Japanese: 雪之丞変化, Hepburn: Yukinojō henge), also known as Revenge of a Kabuki Actor, is a 1963 Japanese film directed by Kon Ichikawa, based on a novel by Otokichi Mikami.

== Plot ==
Japan in the late Edo period: Three men — Sansai Dobe, Kawaguchiya and Hiromiya — are responsible for the suicide of seven-year-old Yukitarō's mother and father. Yukitarō is adopted and brought up by Kikunojō Nakamura, the actor-manager of an Osaka kabuki troupe. The adult Yukitarō becomes an onnagata, a male actor who plays female roles, taking the stage name Yukinojō. He wears women's clothes and uses the language and mannerisms of a woman offstage as well as on.

Twenty years later, the troupe pays a visit to Edo, where the men responsible for his parents' deaths now live. Yukinojō brings about their deaths, then, having achieved his goal, and apparently overcome by the death of an innocent woman who was part of his schemes but whom he became fond of, retires from the stage and disappears.

The events are coolly observed and sardonically commented on by the Robin-Hood-like thief Yamitarō.

== Cast ==
- Kazuo Hasegawa as Yukinojō Nakamura and Yamitarō
- Fujiko Yamamoto as Ohatsu
- Ayako Wakao as Namiji
- Raizō Ichikawa as Hirutarō
- Shintarō Katsu as Hōjin, the escaped convict
- Eiji Funakoshi as Heima Kadokura
- Chūsha Ichikawa as Kikunojō Nakamura
- Narutoshi Hayashi as Mukuzu
- Nakamura Ganjirō II as Sansai Dobe
- Saburō Date as Kawaguchiya
- Eijirō Yanagi as Hiromiya
- Jun Hamamura as Isshōsai
- Toshio Chiba as Rōnin
- Masayoshi Kikuno as Yukinojō’s father
- Kōichi Mizuhara as Dobe’s retainer
- Shirō Ōtsuji as First Constable
- Tokio Oki as Second Constable
- Michirō Minami as First Townsman
- Yutaka Nakamura as Second Townsman
- Chitose Maki as Townswoman
- Eigorō Onoe as The Shōgun
- Musei Tokugawa as Narrator

== Production ==
Mikami's novel had been adapted for the screen numerous times before, the first time by Teinosuke Kinugasa (1935–36), which also starred Kazuo Hasegawa. The 1963 version was Hasegawa's 300th role as a film actor, who plays both Yukinojō and thief Yamitarō. The screenplay was written by director Ichikawa's wife, Natto Wada, based on Kinugasa's 1935 and Daisuke Itō's 1939 dramatisations. Yoshinobu Nishioka served as art director. The voice-over narration was provided by famous benshi Musei Tokugawa.

== Reception ==
On review aggregator website Rotten Tomatoes, the film holds an approval rating of 95% based on 21 reviews.
