= The Hole (1957 film) =

The Hole 穴 Ana
- Theatrical poster
- Directed by: Kon Ichikawa
- Written by: Kon Ichikawa; Natto Wada
- Produced by: Hiroaki Fujii (planner); Hideo Nagata
- Cinematography: Setsuo Kobayashi
- Edited by: Tatsuji Nakashizu
- Music by: Yasushi Akutagawa
- Distributed by: Daiei Film
- Release date: October 15, 1957 (Japan)
- Running time: 103 minutes
- Country: Japan
- Language: Japanese

The Hole (Japanese: 穴, Hepburn: Ana), also known as Hole in One and The Pit, is a 1957 black-and-white comedy/mystery Japanese film directed by Kon Ichikawa.

== Plot ==
A reporter, Nagako Kita (Machiko Kyō), is fired for writing about police corruption. To make money, she hides while a weekly magazine publishes photos of her, and offers a prize to the person who discovers her. A group of three bank embezzlers, So Yamamura, Eiji Funakoshi, and Sotoji Mukui (Fujio Harumoto) employ Mukui's younger sister Fukiko as a fake employee at the bank and plan to make her disappear when the real woman appears again and blame the crime on her.

When she contacts Mukui about the crime, she finds him dead and Fukiko pulls a gun on her. She contacts the policeman who was fired, who is now a private detective.

== Staff ==
The art director was Tomoo Shimogawara.

== Cast ==
- Machiko Kyō as Nagako Kita
- Eiji Funakoshi as Koisuke Sengi
- So Yamamura as Keikichi Shirasu
- Kenji Sugawara as police Sarumaru
- Jun Hamamura as taxi driver
- Fujio Harumoto as Sotoji Mikui
- Sumiko Hidaka as Takeko Nakamura
- Shintarō Ishihara as writer
- Ryuichi Ishii as Shuta Torigai
- Yasuko Kawakami as Fukiko Mukui
- Tanie Kitabayashi as Suga Akabane
- Bontarō Miyake as chief editor Oya
- Mantarō Ushio as Sahei
