= Shōhei Ōoka =

Japanese writer (1909–1988)

- 大岡 昇平
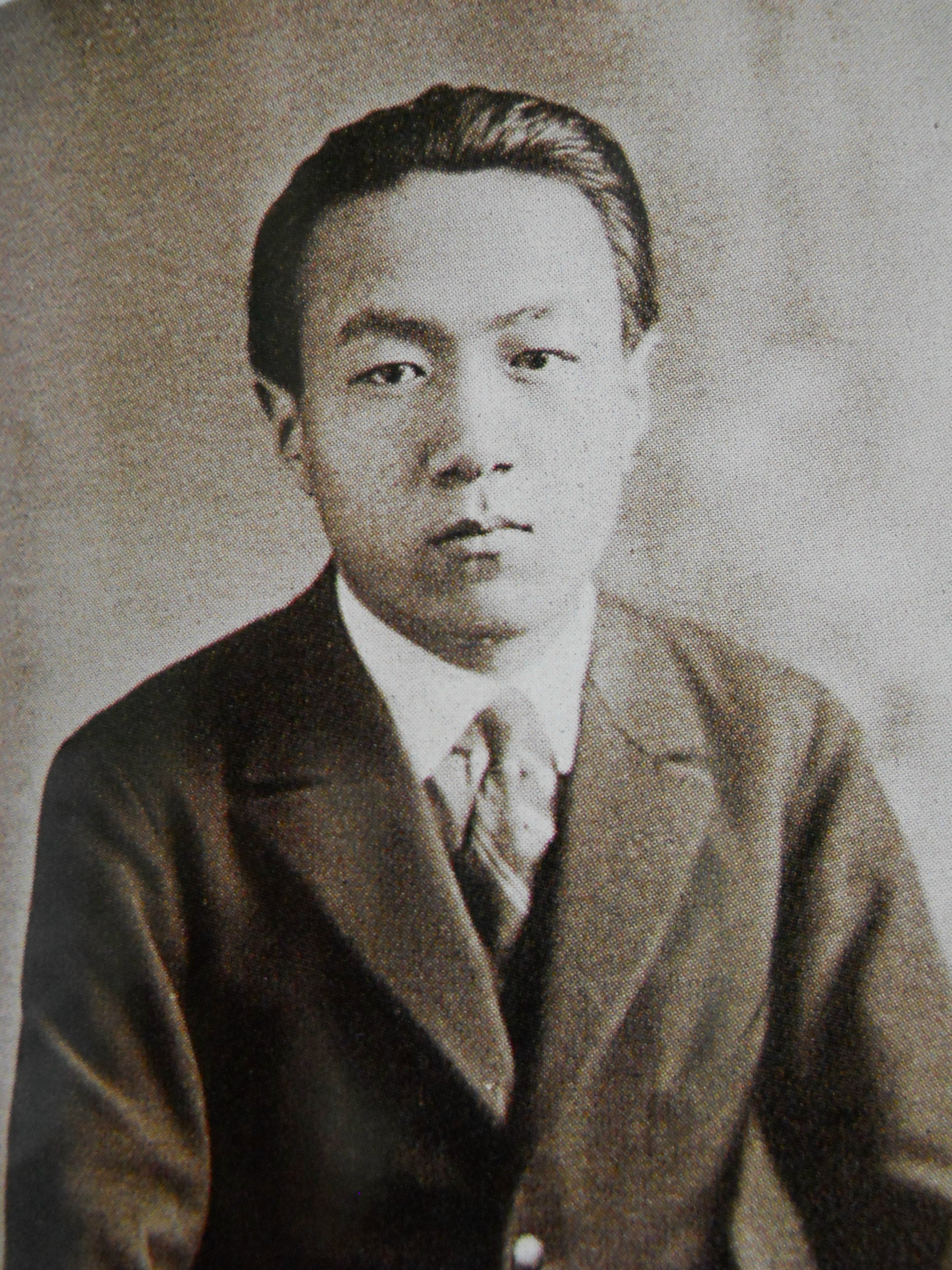
- Shōhei Ōoka
- Born: March 6, 1909; Tokyo, Empire of Japan
- Died: December 25, 1988 (aged 79); Tokyo, Japan
- Resting place: Tama Cemetery, Fuchū, Tokyo, Japan
- Education: Kyoto Imperial University
- Occupation: writer
- Writing career
- Genres: novels, literary criticism, short stories, non-fiction
- Notable work: Fires on the Plain (1951)
- Notable awards: Yomiuri Prize (1961), (1989); Shinchosha Literary Prize (1961); Mainichi Art Prize (1971); Noma Literary Prize (1974); Asahi Prize (1976); Mystery Writers of Japan Award (1978)

Shōhei Ōoka (Japanese: 大岡 昇平, romanized: Ōoka Shōhei; March 6, 1909 – December 25, 1988) was a Japanese novelist, literary critic, and lecturer and translator of French literature who was active during the Shōwa period. Ōoka belongs to the group of postwar writers whose Pacific War experiences at home and abroad figure prominently in their works. Over his lifetime, he contributed short stories and critical essays to almost every literary magazine in Japan.

== Early life ==
Ōoka was born in the ward of Ushigome in Tokyo (now part of Shinjuku) to parents from Wakayama Prefecture. His father was a stockbroker and his mother was a geisha. Raised to study literature from early childhood, he mastered French while in high school. His parents also hired the famed literary critic Kobayashi Hideo to be his tutor. Under Kobayashi's instruction, he made the acquaintance of poet Nakahara Chūya, the critic Kawakami Tetsutaro, and others who would become well known literary figures. He entered Kyoto Imperial University School of Literature in April 1929, graduating in March 1932.

After graduation, he became a journalist with the Kokumin Shimbun, a pro-government newspaper, but quit after one year to devote himself to the study and translation of the works of Stendhal and other European writers into Japanese. In 1938, to support himself, he found a job as a translator with Air Liquide (Teikoku Sanso), a Franco-Japanese industrial company based in Kobe. In June 1943, he left their employ, and in November of the same year obtained a position at Kawasaki Heavy Industries.

However, in 1944, he was drafted into the Imperial Japanese Army, given only three months of rudimentary training and sent to the front line at Mindoro Island in the Philippines, where he served as his battalion's communications technician until his battalion was routed and numerous men killed. In January 1945, he was captured by American forces and sent to a prisoner of war camp on Leyte Island. Survival was very traumatic for Ōoka, who was troubled that he, a middle-aged and, to his way of thinking, unworthy soldier, had survived when so many others had not. He returned to Japan at the end of the year and lived at Akashi, Hyōgo.

== Literary career ==
It was not until his repatriation after the war's end that Ōoka began his career as a writer. On the recommendation of his childhood French tutor and mentor Kobayashi Hideo, he published an autobiographical short-story of his experiences as a prisoner of war entitled Furyoki (俘虜記; lit. 'Account of a Prisoner of War'), published in English as Taken Captive: A Japanese POW's Story, in three separate parts between 1948 and 1951. Its publication, along with winning the Yokomitsu Riichi Prize in 1949, encouraged him to take up writing as a career.

His next work, Musashino Fujin, (武蔵野夫人, "A Wife in Musashino", 1950), is a psychological novel patterned after the works of Stendhal.

His best-known novel, Nobi (野火, Fires on the Plain, 1951), was also well received by critics, and won the prestigious Yomiuri Prize in 1951. Considered one of the most important novels of the postwar period and based loosely on his own wartime experiences in the Philippines, Nobi explores the meaning of human existence through the struggle for survival of men who are driven by starvation to cannibalism. It was subsequently made into a prize-winning film by Ichikawa Kon in 1959, although the film substantially changes the protagonist's relationship to the theme of cannibalism and Christianity.

In 1958, he veered from his usual subjects and produced Kaei (花影, "The Shade of Blossoms", 1958–1959), depicting an aging, naive nightclub hostess’s struggle and ultimate demise from the destructive forces of desire and wealth in the decadent 1950s Ginza. The setting had changed but the recurring themes had not. His characters were still adrift and struggling for survival in an inhospitable environment. Kaei won the Shinchosha Literary Prize in 1961.

From 1953 to 1954, he was a Fulbright Visiting Professor at Yale University. He was also a lecturer on French literature at Meiji University in Tokyo.

In the late 1960s, he revisited the subject of the Pacific War and the Japanese defeat in the Philippines to produce the detailed historical novel Reite senki (レイテ戦記, "A Record of the Battle of Leyte", 1971). He compiled and researched an enormous amount of information for three years in order to produce it. As with all his writing, it looks at war critically from the perspective of a person who, despite ethical reservations, was forced to serve. The novel won the Mainichi Art Award.

He was invited to become a member of the Japan Art Academy in November 1971 but declined to join, partly, he said, on account of his former experience of soldier and prisoner of war.

Along with translations and fiction, he also devoted himself to writing the critical biographies of Tominaga Taro and Nakahara Chūya, which won the Noma Literary Prize in 1974. He was awarded the prestigious Asahi Prize in January 1976 and the Mystery Writers of Japan Award in March 1978.

He died in 1988 at the age of 79. His grave is at the Tama Cemetery in the outskirts of Tokyo. He was posthumously awarded a second Yomiuri Prize in 1989 for a biography of Natsume Sōseki.

In October 1994, the Japanese writer Kenzaburō Ōe, when awarded the Nobel Prize of literature, mentioned Shohei Ōoka as one of the Japanese writers who "created the way to the Nobel Prize" for him

== See also ==
- Japanese literature
- List of Japanese authors
- The Second Generation of Postwar Writers
