= Masayuki Takagi =

- Born: 1906
- Died: 1976 (aged 69–70)
- Occupation: film producer
- Years active: 1955-1970

Masayuki Takagi (高木雅行, Takagi Masayuki) is a Japanese film producer. He was born in 1906 and died in 1976. He was nominated in 1956 for the Academy Award for Best Foreign Language Film for producing Kon Ichikawa's The Burmese Harp. His other film production credits include Ichikawa's Ghost Story of Youth (1955) and The Heart (1955), Seijun Suzuki's The Bastard (1963), Our Blood Will Not Forgive (1964) and Tattooed Life (1965), and Shohei Imamura's Unholy Desire (1965). He also served as associate producer for part of Tora! Tora! Tora! (1970).
