= Zatoichi's Vengeance =

- DVD cover

Japanese name
- Kanji: 座頭市の歌が聞える
Transcriptions
- Revised Hepburn: Zatōichi no uta ga kikoeru
- Directed by: Tokuzō Tanaka
- Written by: Hajime Takaiwa
- Based on: Zatoichi by Kan Shimozawa
- Produced by: Ikuo Kubodera
- Starring: Shintaro Katsu; Jun Hamamura; Mayumi Ogawa; Kei Satō
- Cinematography: Kazuo Miyagawa
- Edited by: Kanji Suganuma
- Music by: Akira Ifukube
- Production company: Daiei Studios
- Release date: 3 May 1966 (Japan)
- Running time: 83 minutes
- Country: Japan
- Language: Japanese

Zatoichi's Vengeance (Japanese: 座頭市の歌が聞える, Hepburn: Zatōichi no uta ga kikoeru) is a 1966 Japanese chambara film directed by Tokuzō Tanaka and starring Shintaro Katsu as the blind masseur Zatoichi. It was originally released by the Daiei Motion Picture Company (later acquired by Kadokawa Pictures).

Zatoichi's Vengeance is the thirteenth episode in the 26-part film series devoted to the character of Zatoichi.

== Plot ==
Traveling on the road, Zatoichi (Katsu) encounters a dying man who gives him a bag full of money and the name "Taichi". Traveling on, he makes the acquaintance of a blind biwa-playing priest. The two travel to a town that is having their annual thunder drum festival. The town is under the domination of a Yakuza boss who extorts from the people.

== Cast ==
- Shintaro Katsu as Zatoichi
- Shigeru Amachi as Kurobe
- Jun Hamamura as blind priest
- Gen Kimura as Tamekichi
- Koichi Mizuhara as Joshuya
- Mayumi Ogawa as Ocho/Oshino
- Kei Satō as Boss Gonzo

== Production ==
- Yoshinobu Nishioka - Art director

== Reception ==
In a contemporary review, "Chie." of Variety praised the film, noting "superlative camerawork" of Kazuo Miyagawa and compared the Zatoichi series to the James Bond film series, noting its "coolness and sense of fun". "Chie." noted a highlight to be the film's finale with its battle on the bridge as being "splendidly photographed".

From a retrospective review, J. Doyle Wallis, in a review for DVD Talk, wrote that "Zatoichi's Vengeance displays one of the most interesting aspects of Zatoichi as a character."
