= Kazuo Miyagawa =

Japanese cinematographer (1908–1999)

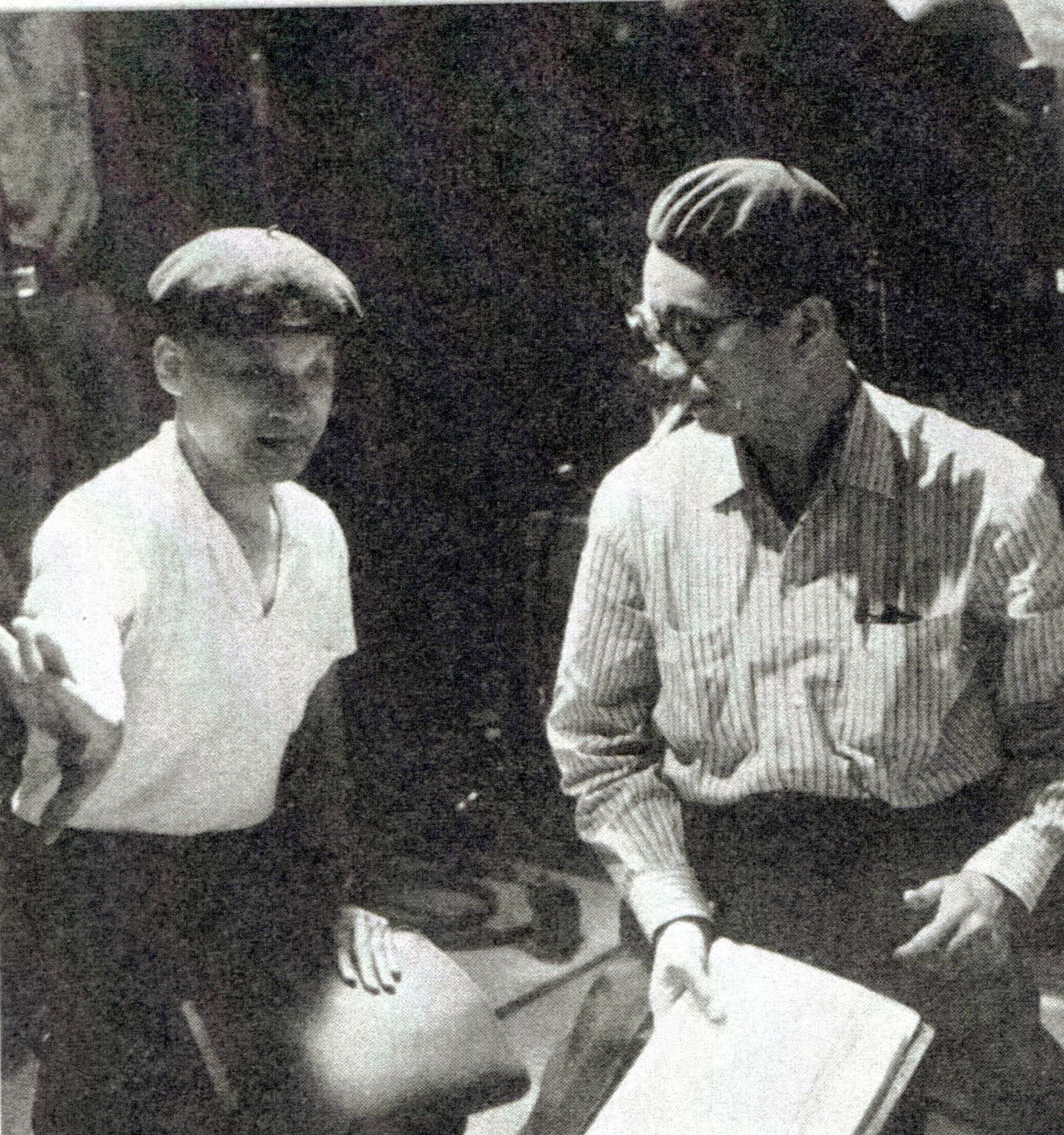
- Kazuo Miyagawa (left) with Kon Ichikawa (right). (1963)
- Born: 25 February 1908; Kyoto, Empire of Japan
- Died: 7 August 1999 (aged 91); Tokyo, Japan
- Occupation: Cinematographer
- Known for: Bleach bypass technique
- Children: 3

Kazuo Miyagawa (宮川 一夫, Miyagawa Kazuo; February 25, 1908 – August 7, 1999) was a Japanese cinematographer. He worked with some of the most prominent directors of Japanese cinema during the 1950s and '60s, notably Akira Kurosawa, Kenji Mizoguchi, Kon Ichikawa and Yasujirō Ozu. He won three Japan Academy Film Prizes for his work. The Museum of Modern Art called him "most influential cinematographer of postwar Japanese cinema."

== Career ==
Born in Kyoto, Miyagawa was taken with sumi-e Chinese ink painting from the age of eleven and began to sell his work as an illustrator while a teenager. He became interested in the cinema during the 1920s, particularly admiring the German Expressionist silents. He joined the Nikkatsu film company in 1926 after graduating from Kyoto Commercial School. He began as a laboratory technician before becoming an assistant cameraman. Miyagawa cited the cinematography of Eiji Tsuburaya, Hiromitsu Karasawa and Kenzo Sakai as an influence on his career.

Miyagawa is best known for his tracking shots, particularly those in Rashomon (1950), the first of his collaborations with filmmaker Akira Kurosawa. Other films with Kurosawa include Yojimbo (1961) and initial preparations for Kagemusha (1980). He also worked on multiple films directed by Kenji Mizoguchi, including Ugetsu (1953). Still, only on a single Yasujirō Ozu production, Floating Weeds (1959). He oversaw 164 cameramen for Kon Ichikawa's Tokyo Olympiad (1965), a documentary which necessitated the development of new exposure meters and viewfinders. Earlier, he had worked with Ichikawa on the drama films, Enjō ("The Temple of the Golden Pavilion", 1958), Odd Obsession (aka, The Key, 1959) and The Broken Commandment (1962).

Miyagawa worked with Masahiro Shinoda in the 1980s, and at the end of his life was supervising the director's Owls' Castle ("Fukuro no Shiro"/"Castle of Owls", 1999).

Miyagawa is considered the inventor of the cinematographic technique known as bleach bypass, for Ichikawa's film Her Brother (1960).

== Selected filmography ==
- Singing Lovebirds (鴛鴦歌合戦, Oshidori utagassen; 1939)
- Rashomon (羅生門, Rashōmon; 1950)
- Ugetsu (雨月物語, Ugetsu Monogatari; 1953)
- A Geisha (祇園囃子, Gion Bayashi; 1953)
- The Woman in the Rumor (噂の女, Uwasa no onna; 1954)
- Sansho the Bailiff (山椒大夫, Sanshō Dayũ; 1954)
- The Crucified Lovers (近松物語, Chikamatsu Monogatari; 1954)
- Street of Shame (赤線地帯, Akasen chitai; 1956)
- The Love of a Princess (朱雀門, Suzakumon; 1957)
- Enjo (炎上, Enjō; 1958)
- The Gay Masquerade (弁天小僧, Benten Kozō; 1958)
- Odd Obsession (鍵, Kagi; 1959)
- Floating Weeds (1959)
- Scar Yosaburo (切られ与三郎, Kirare Yosaburō; 1960)
- Her Brother (1960)
- Yojimbo (用心棒, Yōjinbō; 1961)
- Zatoichi and the Chest of Gold (座頭市千両首, Zatōichi senryō-kubi; 1964)
- Tokyo Olympiad (東京オリンピック, Tōkyō Orinpikku; 1965)
- Zatoichi's Vengeance (座頭市の歌が聞える, Zatōichi no uta ga kikoeru; 1966)
- Zatoichi the Outlaw (座頭市牢破り, Zatōichi rōyaburi; 1967)
- A Certain Killer (1967)
- Zatoichi and the Fugitives (1968)
- Zatoichi Meets Yojimbo (1970)
- Zatoichi Goes to the Fire Festival (1970)
- Lone Wolf and Cub: Baby Cart in Peril (1972)
- MacArthur's Children (瀬戸内少年野球団, Setouchi Shōnen Yakyū-dan; 1984)
