= Being Two Isn't Easy =

1962 film

- Theatrical release poster
- Directed by: Kon Ichikawa
- Written by: Michio Matsuda (novel); Natto Wada (writer)
- Produced by: Hidemasa Nagata
- Starring: Eiji Funakoshi; Fujiko Yamamoto
- Cinematography: Setsuo Kobayashi
- Edited by: Yonesaburō Tsukiji
- Music by: Yasushi Akutagawa
- Distributed by: Daiei Film
- Release date: 18 November 1962 (Japan)
- Running time: 88 minutes
- Country: Japan
- Language: Japanese

Being Two Isn't Easy (Japanese: 私は二歳, Hepburn: Watashi wa nisai; lit. I am two) is a 1962 color Japanese comedy film directed by Kon Ichikawa. It was Japan's submission to the 35th Academy Awards for the Academy Award for Best Foreign Language Film, but was not accepted as a nominee.

== Style ==
Ichikawa utilized the screen personas of popular stars Fujiko Yamamoto (glamorous, restrained) and Eiji Funakoshi (hapless, self-conscious) to make the child's independence and frequent endangerment believable. The director contrasts Chiyo's well-coiffed, reactive approach to motherhood by shooting Misako Watanabe as her sister-in-law in a sensuous, intimate manner as she bathes her own newborn.

== Cast ==
- Hiro Suzuki as Taro, the baby
- Eiji Funakoshi as Goro, the father
- Fujiko Yamamoto as Chiyo, the mother
- Kumeko Urabe as Ino, grandmother
- Misako Watanabe as Setsuko, the aunt
- Masako Kyôzuka as Chiyo's sister
- Mantarō Ushio as Laundry Man
- Kyōko Kishida as Chiyo's Friend
- Shirô Ôtsuji as Doctor
- Jun Hamamura as Older Doctor
- Akira Natsuki as Doctor at Hospital

== See also ==
- List of submissions to the 35th Academy Awards for Best Foreign Language Film
- List of Japanese submissions for the Academy Award for Best Foreign Language Film
