= Tanie Kitabayashi =

Japanese actress and voice actress (1911–2010)

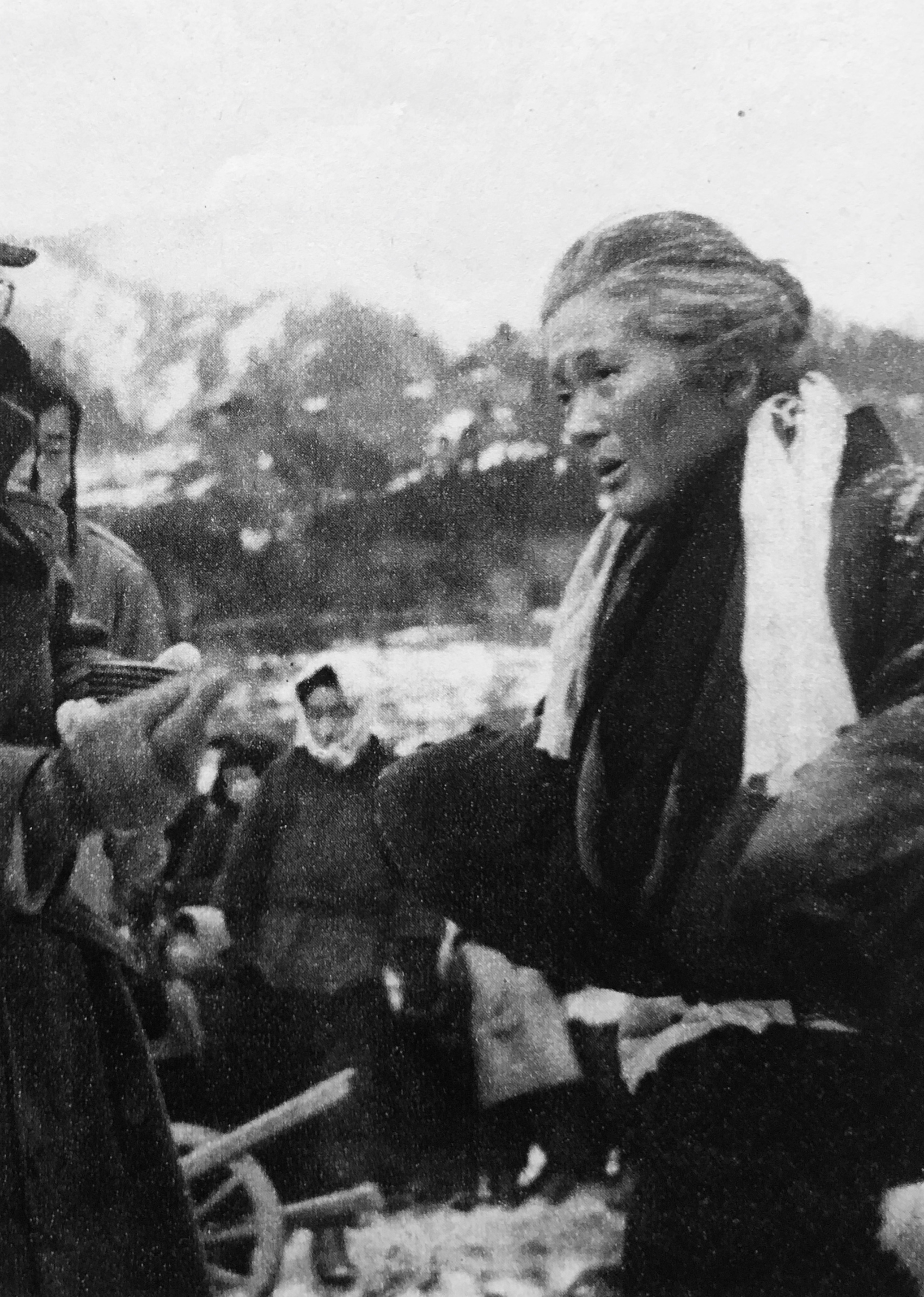
- Born: Reiko Andou (安藤 蓮以子, Andō Reiko); May 21, 1911; Tokyo, Japan
- Died: April 27, 2010 (aged 98); Tokyo, Japan
- Occupation: Actress
- Years active: 1936–2003

Tanie Kitabayashi (北林谷栄, Kitabayashi Tanie; May 21, 1911 – April 27, 2010) was a Japanese actress and voice actress. Born Reiko Ando in Tokyo, she began as a stage actress. Kitabayashi was a founding member of the famed Mingei Theatre Company, founded in 1950. Early in her career, she became well known for portraying older women. In 1960, she won best actress awards at the 10th Blue Ribbon Awards and at the Mainichi Film Awards for Kiku to Isamu. She also won the Japan Academy Prize for best actress in Rainbow Kids (1991), a film that also earned her honors from the Mainichi Film Awards and from Kinema Junpo. She died on April 27, 2010, of pneumonia at a Tokyo hospital. She was 98.

== Filmography ==
=== Films ===
- Children of Hiroshima (1952)
- Epitome (1953)
- Life of a Woman (1953)
- Wolf (1955)
- Mahiru no ankoku (1956)
- Shirogane Shinjū (1956)
- An Actress (1956)
- The Hole (1957)
- Yūrakuchō de Aimashō (1957)
- Enjō (1958)
- Kiku to Isamu (1959)
- My Second Brother (1959)
- Odd Obsession (1959)
- Sleeping Beauty (1960)
- Foundry Town (1962)
- The Insect Woman (1963)
- Bad Girl (1963)
- The Human Bullet (1968)
- Apart from Life (1970)
- Proof of the Man (1977)
- Nomugi Pass (1979)
- Station (1981)
- Suspicion (1982)
- The Burmese Harp (1985)
- My Neighbor Totoro (1988) – Kanta's grandmother (voice)
- Rikyu (1989) – Ōmandokoro
- Rainbow Kids (1991) – Mrs. Toshiko Yanagawa
- Yomigaeri (2002)
- Letters from the Mountains (2002)

=== Television ===
- Shiroi Kyotō (1978) – Ume Yamada

=== Japanese dub ===
- Snow White and the Seven Dwarfs (1937, dub in 1958) - The Evil Queen

== Honours ==
- Medal with Purple Ribbon (1978)
