= Eiji Funakoshi =

Japanese actor (1923–2007)

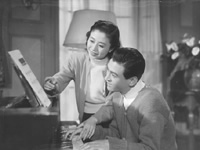
- Nobuko Otowa and Eiji Funakoshi in 1952 Japanese movie Ataka-ke no hitobito
- Born: Eijiro Funakoshi; 17 March 1923; Tokyo, Japan
- Died: 17 March 2007 (aged 84); Shizuoka, Japan
- Occupation: Actor
- Years active: 1947–2001

Eiji Funakoshi (船越 英二, Funakoshi Eiji; 17 March 1923 – 17 March 2007) was a Japanese actor. He received the Kinema Junpo Award for Best Actor and the Mainichi Film Concours for Best Actor for his performance in Fires on the Plain.

== Biography ==
Born Eijirō Funakoshi on 17 March 1923, in Tokyo, Eiji Funakoshi signed up for the Daiei Motion Picture Company in 1947 and made his acting debut the following year with Beautiful Enemy. In a career that spanned three decades Funakoshi starred in a variety of genres and worked for directors Kōzaburō Yoshimura, Mikio Naruse, Kon Ichikawa and Yasuzo Masumura.

Funakoshi was a favorite actor of internationally renowned director Kon Ichikawa. Perhaps their most notable film was the World War II drama Fires on the Plain (Nobi, 1959). Funakoshi played the lead role of Imperial Army Private Tamura, a soldier stationed on Leyte Island in the Philippines. Fires on the Plain won awards in Japan and overseas, including prizes for Kon Ichikawa from the Blue Ribbon in Japan and the Locarno Film Festival in Switzerland.

For several years, Funakoshi portrayed Tanokura Magobei, a close associate of the shogun, on Abarenbō Shōgun.

His son Eiichirō Funakoshi is also a famous actor in Japan.

Eiji Funakoshi died of a stroke on 17 March 2007, his 84th birthday.

== Filmography ==
Year	Film	Role
1953	Older Brother, Younger Sister (あにいもうと Ani Imōto)	Kobata
1955	A Girl Isn't Allowed to Love (薔薇いくたびか Bara ikutabika)	Tsuruo Ichioka
1957	The Hole (穴 Ana)	Koisuke Sengi
1958	The Loyal 47 Ronin (忠臣蔵 Chūshingura)	Tsunanori Uesugi
1959	Fires on the Plain (野火 Nobi)	Tamura
1960	Jokyo (女経 Jokyo)	Yasushi
1961	Ten Dark Women (黒い十人の女 Kuroi Jūnin no Onna)	
1962	Being Two Isn't Easy (私は二歳 Watashi wa nisai)	Goro, the father
1962	The Graceful Brute (しとやかな獣 Shitoyakana kedamono)	Eisaku Kamiya
1963	An Actor's Revenge (雪之丞変化 Yukinojō Henge)	Heima Kadokura
1964	Manji (卍)	Kotaro Kakiuchi
1965	Gamera (大怪獣ガメラ Daikaijū Gamera)	Dr. Hidaka
1966	Shiroi Kyotō (白い巨塔)	Professor Kikukawa
1969	Gamera vs. Guiron (ガメラ対大悪獣ギロン Gamera Tai Daiakujū Giron)	Dr. Shiga
1969	Blind Beast (盲獣 Mōjū)	Michio Sofu
1975	Tora-san's Rise and Fall (男はつらいよ 寅次郎相合い傘 Otoko wa Tsurai yo: Torajirō Aiaigasa)	

== Honours ==
- Medal with Purple Ribbon (1989)
- Order of the Rising Sun, 4th Class, Gold Rays with Rosette (1995)
