= Odd Obsession =

1959 Japanese film

- Theatrical poster
- Directed by: Kon Ichikawa
- Written by: Keiji Hasebe; Kon Ichikawa; Natto Wada
- Based on: The Key by Jun'ichirō Tanizaki
- Produced by: Hiroaki Fujii; Masaichi Nagata
- Starring: Machiko Kyō; Tatsuya Nakadai; Nakamura Ganjirō II; Jun Hamamura
- Cinematography: Kazuo Miyagawa
- Edited by: Hiroaki Fujii
- Music by: Yasushi Akutagawa
- Production company: Daiei Film
- Distributed by: Daiei Film
- Release date: 23 June 1959 (Japan)
- Running time: 107 minutes
- Country: Japan
- Language: Japanese

Odd Obsession (鍵, Kagi; lit. 'The Key') is a 1959 Japanese satirical comedy drama film directed by Kon Ichikawa. It is based on the 1956 novel The Key by Jun'ichirō Tanizaki.

== Plot ==
Art historian Kenji Kenmochi is married to the much younger Ikuko. Due to his waning virility, he has his doctor give him hormone injections. In addition, he tries to awaken the interest of his daughter Toshiko's fiancé, assistant doctor Kimura, in Ikuko, convinced that his jealousy will bring his manliness back. Ikuko agrees to the plan, as she has developed a genuine interest in Kimura. However, Kimura's main ambition for becoming part of the Kenmochi family is financing his continued studies with Kenji's money. Kenji eventually dies of a heart failure, an effect of his hormone injections.

After the funeral, Ikuko, Toshiko and Kimura plan to live together, although it isn't clear with which woman – or both – Kimura will be sleeping. As they begin their new life with a post-funeral meal, Toshiko tries to poison her mother's tea, not realizing that the poison insecticide powder had been switched with harmless household cleanser in their respective containers. As Toshiko awaits her mother's death from the poison tea, the family maid Hana poisons them all using the actual insecticide. Later the detectives read Ikuko's diary and, thereby discovering the incestuous love quadrangle, ascribe all three deaths to suicide, despite Hana's confession.

== Cast ==
- Machiko Kyō as Ikuko Kenmochi
- Nakamura Ganjirō II as Kenji Kenmochi
- Junko Kanō as Toshiko Kenmochi
- Tatsuya Nakadai as Kimura
- Jun Hamamura as Dr. Sōma
- Tanie Kitabayashi as Hana
- Mayumi Kurata as Koike
- Kyū Sazanka as Curio dealer
- Ichirō Sugai as Masseur
- Mantarō Ushio as Dr. Kodama

== Production ==
For the film, Ichikawa and his co-writers Natto Wada and Keiji Hasebe added a character not in the book, housemaid Hana, who in the finale (again not in the book) poisons Ikuko, Toshiko and Kimura.

== Awards ==
Odd Obsession was entered into the 1960 Cannes Film Festival, where it won the Jury Prize. It also received the 1960 Samuel Goldwyn International Award.

== See also ==
- The Key, a 1983 adaption of Tanizaki's novel by Tinto Brass
