= A Thousand and One Nights with Toho =

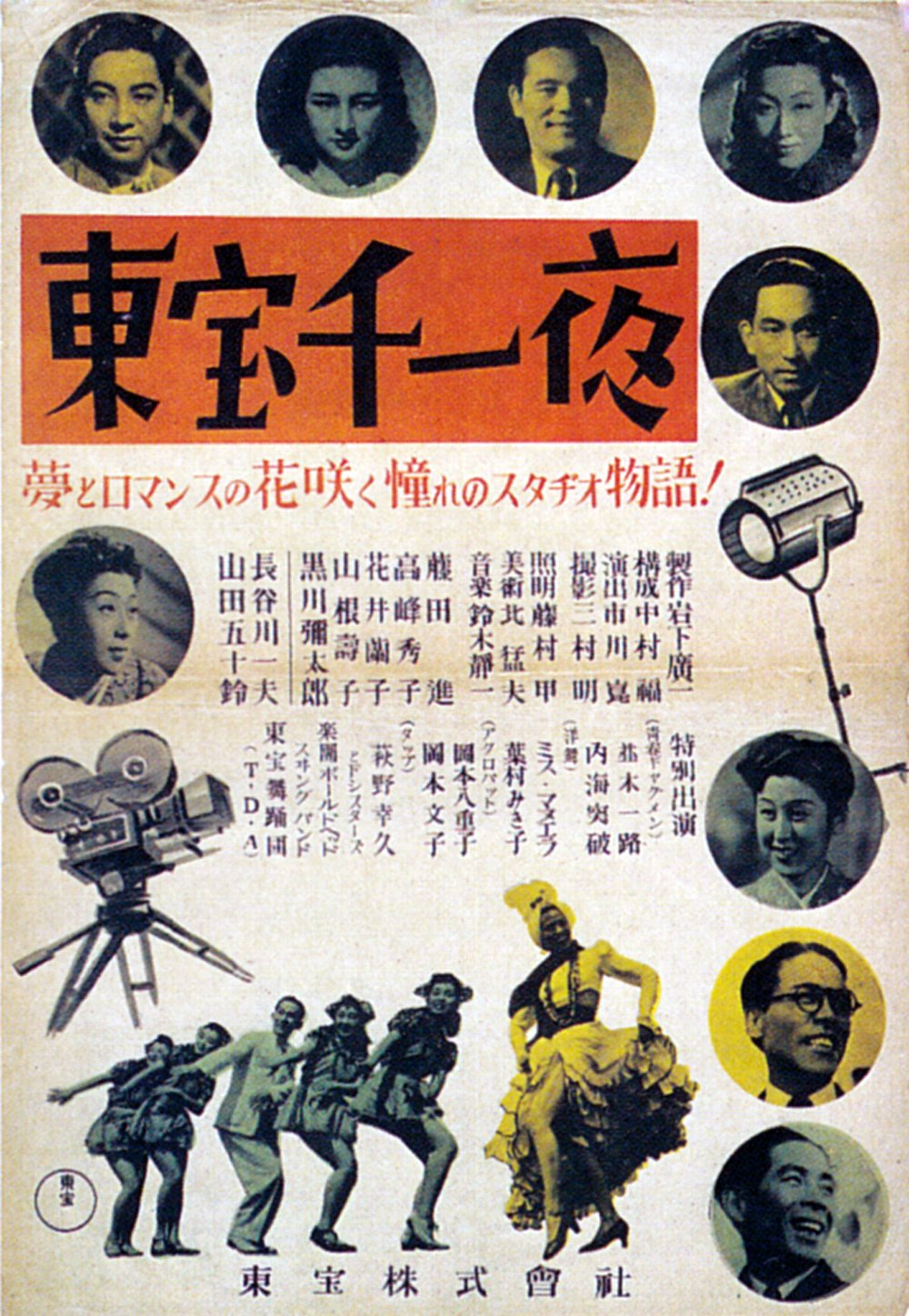
- Theatrical release poster
- Directed by: Kon Ichikawa
- Written by: Fuku Nakamura
- Produced by: Koichi Iwashita
- Starring: Yatarō Kurokawa; Susumu Fujita; Isuzu Yamada
- Cinematography: Akira Mimura
- Music by: Seiichi Suzuki
- Production company: Shintoho
- Distributed by: Toho
- Release date: February 25, 1947
- Running time: 61 minutes
- Country: Japan
- Language: Japanese

A Thousand and One Nights with Toho (東宝千一夜, Toho senichi-ya) is a 1947 black-and-white Japanese film directed by Kon Ichikawa, with special effects by Eiji Tsuburaya.

== Plot ==
Actress Yamane is chased by two suspicious men and escapes to the studio. As she escapes to the kimono, preview room, and stage, there are singing and dancing shows.

== Cast ==
- Hisako Yamane
- Susumu Fujita
- Isuzu Yamada
- Ranko Hanai
- Haruo Tanaka
- Yataro Kurokawa
