= The Burmese Harp (1985 film) =

- Theatrical release poster
- Directed by: Kon Ichikawa
- Written by: Natto Wada
- Based on: The Burmese Harp; 1956 film by Kon Ichikawa
- Produced by: Masaya Araki; Hiroaki Fujii; Masaru Kakutani
- Starring: Kôji Ishizaka; Kiichi Nakai; Takuzô Kawatani
- Cinematography: Setsuo Kobayashi
- Edited by: Chizuko Osada
- Music by: Naozumi Yamamoto
- Distributed by: Toho
- Release date: July 20, 1985 (Japan)
- Running time: 133 minutes
- Country: Japan
- Language: Japanese
- Box office: ¥5.9 billion

The Burmese Harp (Japanese: ビルマの竪琴, Hepburn: Biruma no Tategoto), also known as Harp of Burma, is a 1985 Japanese film directed by Kon Ichikawa. The film is a color remake of the 1956 black-and-white The Burmese Harp, which was also directed by Ichikawa.

== Cast ==
- Kiichi Nakai
- Kōji Ishizaka
- Nenji Kobayashi
- Jun Hamamura
- Atsushi Watanabe

== Reception ==
The Burmese Harp was the number one Japanese film on the domestic market in 1985, earning ¥2.95 billion in distribution income. With an audience of 3.87 million people, it was then the second largest Japanese box office hit. The film grossed a total of ¥5.9 billion or $29,000,000 (equivalent to $87,000,000 in 2025) in Japan.
