= Shōji Yasui =

Japanese actor

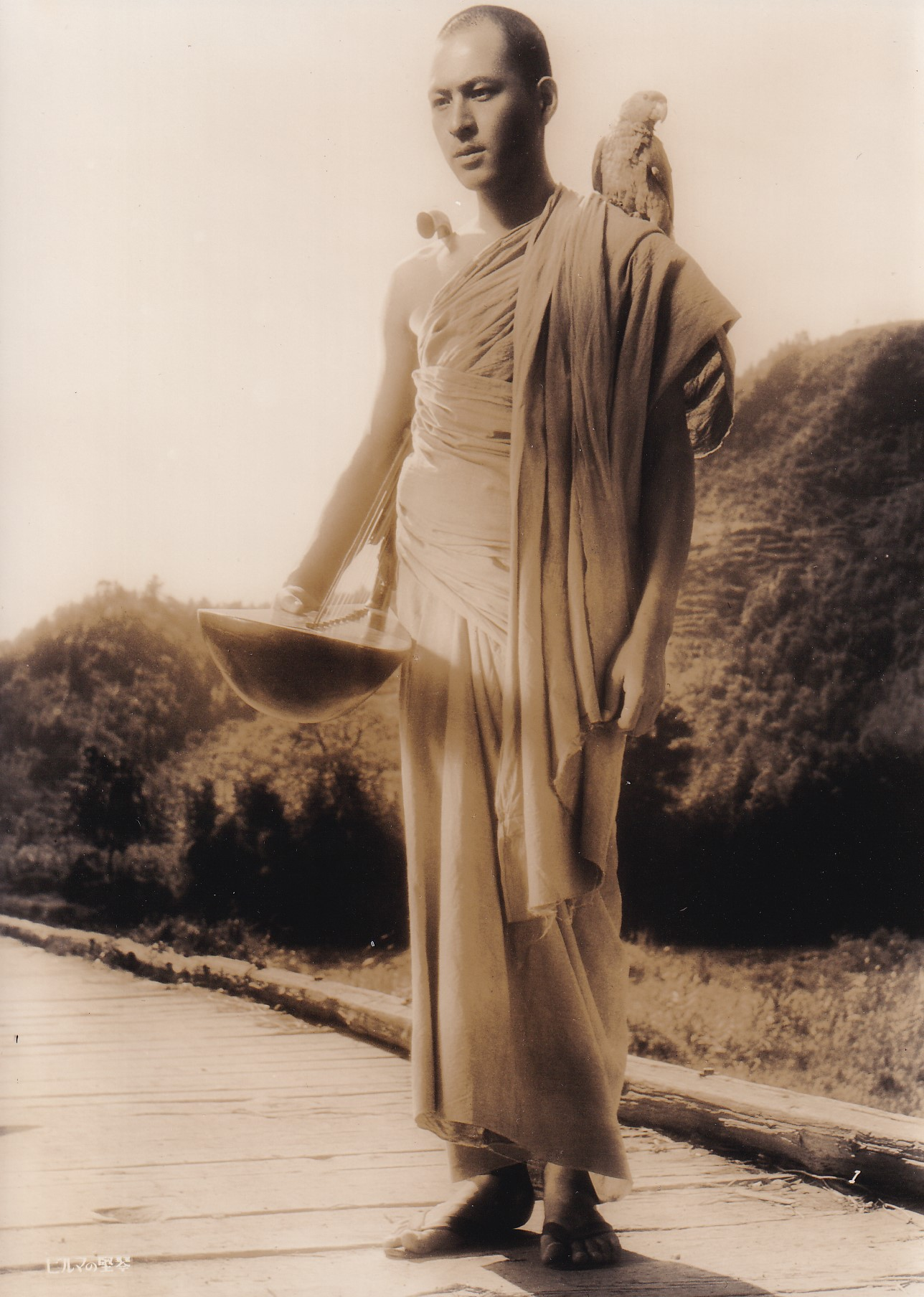
- Born: August 16, 1928; Tokyo, Japan
- Died: March 3, 2014 (aged 85)
- Occupation: Actor

Shōji Yasui (安井 昌二, Yasui Shōji; 16 August 1928 – 3 March 2014) was a Japanese actor. He was best known for playing the central role of Private Mizushima in Kon Ichikawa's The Burmese Harp.

== Career ==
Born in Tokyo, Yasui first joined a troupe led by Kazuo Hasegawa. He entered the Nikkatsu studio in 1954 and made his debut in a film scripted by Yasujirō Ozu. After starring in The Burmese Harp, he starred with his own family in the television show Chako-chan. He joined the Gekidan Shinpa troupe and become a main actor in their stage productions.
