= Walter Baxter =

British writer

- Walter Baxter from a 1951 publication
- Born: 17 May 1915; London, England
- Died: 25 July 1994 (aged 79); Marlborough, England
- Occupation: Novelist
- Partner: Fergus Provan
- Writing career
- Notable works: Look Down in Mercy; The Image and the Search

Walter Baxter (17 May 1915 – 25 July 1994) was a British novelist, best known for writing two controversial novels. His first novel, Look Down in Mercy, received very positive reviews. He was prosecuted on obscenity charges after the publication of his second novel, The Image and the Search, but was acquitted after two trials. He was also a successful restaurateur.

== Early career ==
Baxter was born in London and raised in Kent. He was educated at St. Lawrence College, Ramsgate and Trinity College, Cambridge where he studied law. He was articled to a solicitor in London before the war but following his service in the Army he never returned to the law. Baxter served in the British Army during the Second World War, as a company commander. The company fought in Burma, retreating to India. Later, he was aide-de-camp to Lieutenant General William Slim of the Fourteenth Army.

He came back to London after the war and briefly joined his family's business, but in September 1949 he decided to pursue a career in writing. A few months later he became a Catholic. He was close to completing his first book when he was presented with an opportunity to volunteer with the Jesuits as a missionary. He performed that work for seven months at a jungle mission station in a remote village about 40 miles (64 km) from Ranchi, India.

== Look Down in Mercy ==
Baxter's first novel, Look Down in Mercy, published in 1951, drew on his military experience. Set in Burma and other Far East locations during World War II, it centres on the homosexual relationship between an officer, Tony Kent, and his batman Anson. Although Kent, a British officer stationed in Burma, loves his wife back in England, he seduces a Eurasian nurse. After the brief affair, he feels guilty and hates both the girl and himself. Later, during an especially stressful period, he spends a night with Anson and loses self-respect because of the homosexual act. The officer and the batman are captured after a Japanese attack. Kent initially divulges nothing more than his name, rank and serial number, but after being shown how his fellow soldiers had been tortured, and he is threatened with the same, he reveals to his Japanese interrogator all of the information he knows. After an air raid, Anson is able to escape, also saving Kent. Their relationship resumes, and Kent kills a soldier who has figured this out and tried to blackmail him. After the company has arrived in India, Kent attempts suicide by defenestration.

The conclusion of the novel differs between the American and UK editions. The UK edition ends with the following passage, which gives the book its title:

As his body began to plunge towards the drive he held his arms in a grotesque attitude as though to break his fall and he cried out; but not for mercy.

However, the American edition features a happier ending, in which it is made clear that Kent survives and resolves to pursue a life with Anson. The American edition also featured more physical intimacy between Kent and Anson, including kissing.

Look Down in Mercy was hailed as "an uncommonly good first novel" by Time magazine, and has been deemed "a pioneering study of gay relationships in a hostile and indifferent world". A 1956 scholarly journal article, "The Most Neglected Books of the Past Twenty-Five Years", cited the novel as "very remarkable ... even as truly great", but claimed that most American critics had not acknowledged this.

== The Image and the Search ==
His second novel, The Image and the Search, was published in October 1953. Baxter writes of Sarah, who is very happily married to RAF member Robert. Robert is the ideal "image" alluded to in the book's title. After Robert is killed in the war, Sarah embarks on a search for love to match that which she shared with Robert. She takes many lovers, but none can compare to Robert. While in India on business, she encounters Johan, who, although dark, bears a resemblance to Robert. Sarah tries to seduce Johan, but she does not succeed. Her quest for love has been futile.

The novel was praised by E. M. Forster as "a serious and beautiful book". However, a Saturday Review Book Service critic wrote that the book's theme was intractable and the protagonist was unsympathetic; this critic also quipped that the heroine's climax in her pursuit "sets some sort of a new high in phallic symbolism". In March 1954, the Sunday Express printed a column in which Max Aitken, Lord Beaverbrook stated that the lesson to be surmised from the book's "erotic odyssey" was that "sexual excess can be indulged in with a light heart and a clear conscience". The column went on to suggest that Alexander Stewart Frere, the chairman of the book's publisher Heinemann, should immediately withdraw the book. A week later the Express quoted a Heinemann official as saying, "We have not withdrawn the book, it just isn't for sale any more." Heinemann also withheld copies of the book from Putnam's, its New York publisher. A representative from Putnam's said that "the Sunday Express' attack has succeeded in having the book banned. We regard this as an extremely unfortunate case of arbitrary censorship. We do not in the least agree with the Express' position nor Heinemann's action."

In October 1954, Baxter and Frere were put on trial at the Old Bailey, charged under the Obscene Publications Act 1857 for The Image and The Search. Baxter released a statement that "my object was a serious portrayal of the vulnerability to evil of any ego-centred personality and the disintegrating effect of sin on such a personality". Frere also released a statement, saying in part, "I regard Walter Baxter as one of the most gifted writers of this generation, whose powers are not yet fully developed. I feel that the publishers owe a duty to such writers and to the public to ensure that their creative work is not still-born. If it has value and is not deleterious to potential readers, I was, and am myself, satisfied that this book would not harm any readers." The case was prosecuted by Mervyn Griffith-Jones, who six years later led the unsuccessful prosecution in the case against Lady Chatterley's Lover. When the jury could not reach agreement after two trials, the defendants were acquitted.

== Later life ==
The trials were disheartening for Baxter, and he would not write another book. Christopher Isherwood wrote in 1961 that Baxter "... has become a rather tragic self-pitying drunken figure with a philosophy of failure." Baxter eventually became very successful in his new career as a restaurateur. His French restaurant in South Kensington, called The Chanterelle, was quite influential and highly regarded. Baxter met chef Fergus Provan in 1962. Baxter and Provan became companions – a relationship which would last for thirty years. Beginning in 1978, they also had a professional connection, as Baxter retired and Provan took over the running of Baxter's restaurant. Baxter died on 25 July 1994.
