= Ten Dark Women =

- Theatrical release poster
- Directed by: Kon Ichikawa
- Written by: Natto Wada
- Produced by: Hiroaki Fujii; Masaichi Nagata
- Cinematography: Setsao Kobayashi
- Edited by: Tatsuji Nakashizu
- Music by: Yasushi Akutagawa
- Distributed by: Daiei Film
- Release date: 3 May 1961
- Running time: 105 minutes
- Country: Japan
- Language: Japanese

Ten Dark Women (Kuroi jûnin no onna (黒い十人の女), literally "ten black women") is a 1961 Japanese film directed by Kon Ichikawa.

== Plot ==
A married television executive has many mistresses. Nine of the mistresses and his wife band together and plan to kill him. His wife tells him they are planning to kill him and they fake his death at a meeting of all ten women using a pistol loaded with blanks and a tomato.

The other women tell her that they were not really serious about killing him and run away. One of the women, Miwako, commits suicide, and her ghost comes back to view the proceedings. Then they find out that he is not really dead, and they decide to kill him again.

His wife divorces him and one of the other women takes him on.

== Staff ==
Sound Recordist	Kenichi Nishii
Art Director	Tomoo Shimokawahara
Special effects	Yonesaburo Tsukiji

== Reception ==
Donald Richie describes it as "an extraordinarily black comedy ... the hilarious hell of a man whose wife, mistresses and girlfriends conspire to murder him".

== Cast ==
Role	Actor
Futaba Kaze	Fujiko Yamamoto
Matsuyoshi Kaze	Eiji Funakoshi
Sayoko Goto	Kyōko Kishida
Ichiko Ishinoshita	Keiko Kishi
	Juzo Itami
Shiomura	Tamao Nakamura
Miwako Mikishi	Mariko Miyagi
Themselves	Hajime Hana and the Crazy Cats
