= Fires on the Plain (1959 film) =

1959 film by Kon Ichikawa

- Theatrical release poster
- Directed by: Kon Ichikawa
- Written by: Natto Wada
- Based on: Fires on the Plain by Shōhei Ōoka
- Produced by: Masaichi Nagata
- Starring: Eiji Funakoshi; Osamu Takizawa; Mickey Curtis
- Narrated by: Eiji Funakoshi
- Cinematography: Setsuo Kobayashi
- Edited by: Tatsuji Nakashizu
- Music by: Yasushi Akutagawa
- Distributed by: Daiei Film
- Release date: November 3, 1959 (Japan)
- Running time: 104 minutes
- Country: Japan
- Language: Japanese

Fires on the Plain (Japanese: 野火, Hepburn: Nobi) is a 1959 Japanese war film directed by Kon Ichikawa, starring Eiji Funakoshi. The screenplay, written by Natto Wada, is based on the novel Nobi (Tokyo 1951) by Shōhei Ōoka, translated as Fires on the Plain. It initially received mixed reviews from both Japanese and international critics concerning its violence and bleak theme. In following decades, however, it has become highly regarded.

Fires on the Plain follows a tubercular Japanese private and his attempt to stay alive during the latter part of World War II. Kon Ichikawa has noted its thematic struggle between staying alive, and crossing the ultimate low.

== Plot ==
In late 1944, the demoralized Imperial Japanese Army on Leyte is in desperate straits, cut off from support and supplies by the Allies, who are in the process of liberating the Philippine island. Private Tamura has tuberculosis and is seen as a useless burden to his company, even though it has been reduced to little more than a platoon in strength. He is ordered to commit suicide by grenade if he is unable to get re-admitted to a nearby field hospital. A sympathetic soldier gives him several yams from the unit's meager supplies.

On his way, he notices mysterious smoke rising in the distance. When he reaches the crowded hospital, he is admonished for coming back and sent away. He joins a group of other rejectees outside. When the Allies start shelling the area, the medical staff abandon the patients and run away. The hospital is hit and destroyed. Tamura flees as well; looking back, he sees many bodies strewn around, but chooses not to go to the aid of any who may still be alive.

Traveling alone, Tamura discovers a deserted village on the coast, where he finds a pile of dead Japanese soldiers. As he searches for food, a young Filipino couple arrive by canoe and run to a hut to retrieve a cache of precious salt hidden under a floorboard. When Tamura enters the hut, the girl begins to scream. Tamura tries to placate them by lowering his rifle, but she continues to scream. He shoots her. The young man escapes in his canoe. Tamura takes the salt and leaves, after dropping his gun in a lake.

He next encounters three Japanese soldiers. They sight more smoke. Tamura believes all the smoke he's seen is coming from signal fires, but one of the others tells him that it's just farmers burning corn husks. The squad leader mentions that the army has been ordered to go to Palompon for evacuation to Cebu. Tamura asks to accompany them. When one soldier notices Tamura's full bag, he shares his salt.

They soon join a stream of ragged, malnourished, dejected soldiers heading to Palompon. Among them are Nagamatsu and Yasuda, familiar men from Tamura's company. Yasuda, wounded in the leg, has Nagamatsu try to trade tobacco for food. When the soldiers come to a heavily traveled road, they decide to wait for night before trying to cross, but they are ambushed by the waiting Americans. The few survivors flee back the way they came.

Later, an American jeep arrives. Tamura prepares to surrender, but gives up the idea when he sees a Filipino woman gun down a fellow Japanese trying the same thing. The accompanying American soldiers are too late to stop her.

Tamura wanders aimlessly. He then runs into a man, who promptly dies in front of him, and he takes the dead man's shoes. Later, he comes across a crazed, exhausted soldier who is consuming his own excrement. He tells Tamura he can eat his body after he is dead. Tamura hastily departs.

He comes across Nagamatsu and Yasuda again. They claim to have survived on monkey meat and are living in the forest. Later, Nagamatsu goes out saying he will hunt more monkeys. When Tamura mentions he has a grenade, Yasuda steals it. Tamura leaves to find Nagamatsu and witnesses him attempting to shoot another man, realizing with a shock what the "monkey meat" really is. Nagamatsu turns the gun toward Tamura, who saves himself by pretending he still has the grenade. Nagamatsu tells Tamura they would be dead if they did not resort to cannibalism.

They head back to camp, but when Tamura mentions that Yasuda has his grenade, Nagamatsu says they will have to kill him or be killed. After tricking Yasuda into spending the grenade, Nagamatsu runs off and stakes out the only source of water in the area. After several days, Yasuda tries to bargain for water, to no avail. When he makes his way to the water anyway, Nagamatsu shoots him and begins butchering his body for meat. Tamura becomes disgusted and shoots Nagamatsu.

Tamura then heads towards the "fires on the plains", desperate to find someone "who is leading a normal life". He slowly walks forward, even as Filipinos shoot at him. The film ends as a bullet hits Tamura and he collapses lifeless to the ground. A title announces it is February 1945.

== Cast ==
| Actor | Role |
|---|---|
| Eiji Funakoshi | Tamura |
| Osamu Takizawa | Yasuda |
| Mickey Curtis | Nagamatsu |
| Mantaro Ushio | Sergeant |
| Kyu Sazanka | Army surgeon |
| Yoshihiro Hamaguchi | Officer |
| Asao Sano | Soldier |
| Masaya Tsukida | Soldier |
| Hikaru Hoshi | Soldier |
| Jun Hamamura | Soldier |

== Production ==
Kon Ichikawa stated in a Criterion Collection interview that he had witnessed the destruction of the atom bomb first hand, and had felt since then that he had to speak out against the horrors of war, despite the many comedies that made up most of his early career. Fires on the Plain got greenlighted by the studio Daiei, because they thought it would be an action movie. Ichikawa decided that it was a film that needed to be made in black and white, specifically requesting Eastman's black and white. The studio initially balked, but after a month of arguing, the studio agreed to Ichikawa's request. Ichikawa also said that he had wanted actor Eiji Funakoshi to be in the film from the beginning. Ichikawa's wife, Natto Wada, penned the script which got the approval of novel author Shohei Ooka.

The film was shot entirely in Japan in Gotenba, Izu and Hakone. The actors were fed little and were not allowed to brush their teeth or cut their nails to make it look more realistic, but doctors were on set constantly. It was delayed for two months when Eiji Funakoshi fainted on the set. When Ichikawa asked Funakoshi's wife what had happened, she responded that he had barely eaten in the two months that he was given to prepare.

Mickey Curtis said, also in a Criterion Collection interview, that he did not think he was a good actor, but Ichikawa said he just needed to act naturally. Ichikawa had heard that Curtis was very thin, so he decided to use him, as the characters in the story have eaten very little. Ichikawa specifically told each actor how he wanted them to react, and would not rehearse. Ichikawa expressed that the narrator (Tamura) could not be a cannibal because then he would have crossed the ultimate low. Ichikawa consulted with his wife, Natto Wada, and they decided against having him eat human flesh. As a result, Tamura never eats any in the film because his teeth are falling out.

== Distribution ==
Fires on the Plain was released November 3, 1959 in Japan. It was later released on June 6, 2000 by Homevision. Then it was released as part of the Criterion Collection on March 13, 2007. The disc includes a video interview with Kon Ichikawa and Mickey Curtis. Also included is a video introduction with Japanese film scholar Donald Richie and a booklet with an essay on Fires on the Plain by Chuck Stephens. The film was digitally restored from a Spirit DataCine 35 mm composite fine-grain master positive print. The sound was restored from a 35 mm optical soundtrack. It was co-released by the Criterion Collection with another Ichikawa film, The Burmese Harp.

== Reception ==
In its early release in the United States, many American critics dismissed Fires on the Plain as a gratuitously bleak anti-war film. In 1963, The New York Times film critic Bosley Crowther gave the film a quite harsh description, writing "Never have I seen a more grisly and physically repulsive film than Fires on the Plain." He continued, "So purposefully putrid is it, so full of degradation and death... that I doubt if anyone can sit through it without becoming a little bit ill... That's how horrible it is." He notes however, "this is a tribute to its maker, for it is perfectly obvious to me that Kon Ichikawa, the director, intended it to be a brutally realistic contemplation of one aspect of war." He points out, "...with all the horror in it, there are snatches of poetry, too..." He ends the review commenting that the only audience who would enjoy the film were those with bitter memories towards the Japanese held over from World War II.

A 1961 Variety review also cautioned that the films bleakness made it a difficult film to promote to audiences, commenting that it "goes much farther than the accepted war masterpieces in detailing for humanity in crisis." Variety's review is more positive than the New York Times, calling it, "one of the most searing pacifistic comments on war yet made... it is a bone hard, forthright film. It is thus a difficult vehicle but one that should find its place."

Dave Kehr of the Chicago Reader said: "No other film on the horrors of war has gone anywhere near as far as Kon Ichikawa's 1959 Japanese feature." John Monogahn of the Detroit Free Press compared it to Clint Eastwood's Letters from Iwo Jima.

In response to the recent Criterion Collection release, Jamie S. Rich of DVD Talk review, had the following to say about it: "I wouldn't call Kon Ichikawa's Fires on the Plain – Criterion Collection an anti-war film so much as I'd call it a realist's war film. Rather than build his story around big explosions and the thrill of battle, Ichikawa instead brings the human drama front and center, directing his spotlight on a soldier who is left to his own devices when the guns stop blazing. He poses the question, 'When stranded on the bombed-out landscape after the fighting has calmed, what will those left behind do to survive?' It's bleak and it's chilling, and yet Fires on the Plain is also completely engrossing. It's the post-action picture as morality play, the journey of the individual recast with Dante-esque overtones. Ichikawa doesn't have to hit you over the head with a message because the story is so truthfully crafted, to state the message outright would be redundant. Once you've seen Fires on the Plain, the movie will get under your skin, and you'll find it impossible to forget."

On the review aggregate site Rotten Tomatoes, the film had a 100% rating based on 20 reviews.

=== Awards ===
In 1960, the film won the Blue Ribbon Awards for Best Director and Best Cinematography, the Kinema Junpo Awards for Best Screenplay and Best Actor (Eiji Funakoshi) and the Mainichi Film Concours for Best Actor (Eiji Funakoshi), all three in Tokyo.

In 1961 it also won the Golden Sail at the Locarno International Film Festival. The film was also selected as the Japanese entry for the Best Foreign Language Film at the 32nd Academy Awards, but was not accepted as a nominee.

== Themes ==
=== Symbolism ===
Donald Richie has written that Fires on the Plain is in contrast to Ichikawa's earlier The Burmese Harp as it "could be considered conciliatory" whereas Fires on the Plain is "deliberately confrontational". Alexander Jacoby has written: "The Burmese Harp and Fires on the Plain differ in approach – the one sentimental, the other visceral, rather in the manner of the American Vietnam movie of later years. The comparison is telling: just as Hollywood has largely failed to deal with the politics of US involvement in Vietnam, preferring to focus on the individual sufferings on American soldiers, so Ichikawa's war films make only a token acknowledgement of wartime atrocities committed by the Japanese, and largely buy into assumptions of Japanese victimhood in World War II – assumptions which to this day remain too widespread in the country." He has further written that, like Tamura, many of Ichikawa's characters are loners.

Max Tessier has called Ichikawa a cinematic entomologist because he "studies, dissects and manipulates" his human characters. Tessier calls Fires on the Plain the summit of this tendency in Ichikawa's work, and "one of the blackest films ever made." Tessier continues that by criticizing the loss of humanity which war causes, the film remains humanist. James Quandt calls Ichikawa a materialist, noting that he represents abstract concepts in simple objects. In Fires on the Plain, life and death are carried by Tamura in the objects of salt and a grenade respectively.

=== Christianity ===
Audie Bock points out that in the novel the narrator is in Japan with a Christian view of life, while the film ends with Tamura walking, hands up into gunfire. When first shown in London, critics complained about this changed ending. By ending with the hero in a hospital meditating on the past, the novel implied a faith in man and the possibility of progress. However Ichikawa's film rejects faith. Tamura puts his faith in man by walking towards the villagers, and he is shot. The individual Tamura may be purified at the end of the film, but the world and mankind are not.

Asked about the controversial change in ending, in which the narrator apparently dies rather than survive, Ichikawa replied, "I let him die... I thought he should rest peacefully in the world of death. The death was my salvation for him." Further, the main character in the film does not have the Christian outlook that narrator of the novel has. Ichikawa explained, "...it somehow didn't seem plausible to show a Japanese soldier saying 'Amen'."

=== Degradation ===
Some critics have seen in Fires on the Plain themes of degradation and brutality. Ichikawa has said that things the characters do, such as cannibalism, are such low acts, that if the protagonist, Tamura did them, he would've crossed such a low that he'd be unredeemable and Ichikawa commented that Fires on the Plain is his attempt to show ""the limits in which moral existence is possible." Others, such as Chuck Stephens, note that Ichikawa occasionally mixes black humour and degradation, like in a scene where soldiers exchange boots, each getting a better pair, until when Tamura looks down at the boots, they are completely soleless.

Film critic Chuck Stephens, in his essay Both Ends Burning for the Criterion Collection release of Fires on the Plain, said the following about Ichikawa : "At once a consummate professional and commercially successful studio team player and an idiosyncratic artist whose bravest films-often displaying a thoroughly odd obsession (to borrow the title of one of his most brilliantly sardonic black comedies) with fusing the brightest and bleakest aspects of human nature-were passionately personal (if not political or polemical) prefigurations of the Japanese new wave, has always had a gift for crystallizing contradiction."

The black humor employed by Ichikawa has also often been the subject of comment by others. It has been claimed that Eiji Funakoshi was fundamentally a comic actor. The noted Japanese film critic Tadao Sato points out that Funakoshi does not play his role in Fires on the Plain in the usual style of post-World War II anti-war Japanese films. He does not put on the pained facial expression and the strained walk typical of the genre, but instead staggers confused through the film more like a drunk man. Sato says that this gives the film its black-comic style which results from watching a man trying to maintain his human dignity in a situation which makes this impossible. Quandt notes that Ichikawa's wife, Natto Wada, wrote the script to the film and contributed this sardonic wit. Audie Bock says that this black humor, rather than relieving the bleakness of the film, has the effect of actually heightening the darkness.

== See also ==
- List of submissions to the 32nd Academy Awards for Best Foreign Language Film
- List of Japanese submissions for the Academy Award for Best Foreign Language Film
