= The Burmese Harp (1956 film) =

1956 film by Kon Ichikawa

- Film poster
- Directed by: Kon Ichikawa
- Screenplay by: Natto Wada
- Based on: The Burmese Harp; 1946 children's novel by Michio Takeyama
- Produced by: Masayuki Takagi
- Starring: Rentarō Mikuni, Shôji Yasui, Jun Hamamura
- Cinematography: Minoru Yokoyama
- Edited by: Masanori Tsujii
- Music by: Akira Ifukube
- Production company: Nikkatsu
- Distributed by: Nikkatsu
- Release dates: 29 January 1956 (Part I); 12 February 1956 (Part II)
- Running time: 143 minutes (Japan); 116 minutes (International)
- Country: Japan
- Language: Japanese
- Box office: $33,763

The Burmese Harp (Japanese: ビルマの竪琴, Hepburn: Biruma no Tategoto; a.k.a. Harp of Burma) is a 1956 Japanese drama film directed by Kon Ichikawa. Based on a children's novel of the same name written by Michio Takeyama, it tells the story of Japanese soldiers who fought in the Burma Campaign during World War II. A member of the group goes missing after the war, and the soldiers hope to uncover whether their friend survived, and if he is the same person as a Buddhist monk they see playing a harp. The film was among the first to show the losses of the war from a Japanese soldier's perspective.

The film was nominated for the Academy Award for Best Foreign Language Film of 1956. In 1985, Ichikawa remade The Burmese Harp in color with a new cast, and the remake was a major box office success, becoming the number one Japanese film on the domestic market in 1985 and the second largest Japanese box office hit up to that time.

== Plot ==
Private Mizushima, a Japanese soldier, becomes the harp (or saung) player of Captain Inouye's group, composed of soldiers who fight and sing to raise morale in the World War II Burma Campaign. When they are offered shelter in a village, they eventually realize they are being watched by British and Indian soldiers. They retrieve their ammunition, then see the advancing force. Captain Inouye tells the men to sing, laugh and clap, to give the British the impression that they are unaware of their presence. Instead of firing at them, though, the British soldiers begin singing the same melody, "Home! Sweet Home!". Inouye's men learn that the war has ended with the Japanese surrender, and so they surrender to the British.

At a camp, a British captain asks Mizushima to talk down a group of soldiers who are still fighting on a mountain. He agrees to do so and is told by the captain that he has 30 minutes to convince them to surrender. At the mountain, he is almost shot by the hold-out soldiers before they realize he is Japanese. He climbs up to the cave and informs their commander that the war has ended and they should surrender. The commander confers with the other soldiers, and they unanimously decide to fight to the end. Mizushima begs for them to surrender but they do nothing. He decides to ask for more time from the British, but when he creates a surrender flag, the others take it the wrong way and believe he is surrendering for them. They beat him unconscious and leave him on the floor. The cave is bombarded and Mizushima is the only survivor.

Mizushima is helped to recover from his injuries by a monk. One day, Mizushima steals the monk's robe and shaves his head so that he will not be spotted as a soldier. He begins a journey to the camp in Mudon where his comrades were sent. Finding many corpses of dead Japanese soldiers along the way, he decides to bury them.

Captain Inouye and his men are wondering what happened and cling to a belief that Mizushima is still alive. Eventually, they buy a parrot and teach it to say "Mizushima, let's go back to Japan together". They have an old woman villager take it to a monk they suspect is Mizushima in hiding. She returns the next day with another parrot that says "No, I cannot go back". She also gives the captain a letter, that explains that Mizushima has decided not to go back to Japan with them, because he must continue burying the dead while studying as a monk and promoting the peaceful nature of mankind. He states in the letter that if he finishes burying all the fallen soldiers' bodies, then he may return to Japan.

== Cast ==
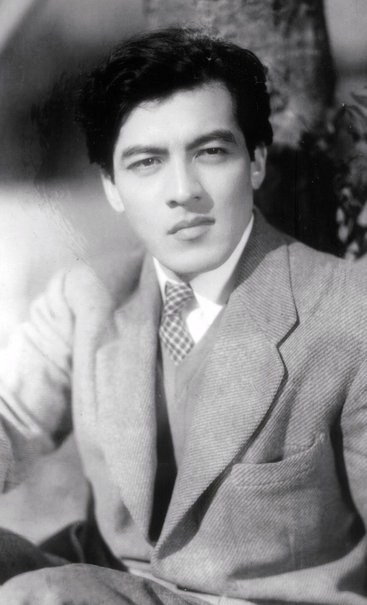
Rentarō Mikuni has a starring role.

- Rentarō Mikuni as Captain Inouye (Nihongo: 陸軍大尉井上, Rikugun-Tai-i Inoue)
- Shoji Yasui as PFC. Mizushima (Nihongo: 水島一等兵, Mizushima Ittōhei)
- Jun Hamamura as Pvt. Ito (Nihongo: 伊藤二等兵, Itō Nitōhei)
- Taketoshi Naito as Pvt. Kobayashi (Nihongo: 小林二等兵, Kobayashi Nitōhei)
- Kō Nishimura as Baba (as Akira Nishimura)

== Production ==
=== Development ===
Michio Takeyama's novel The Burmese Harp was popular, and director Kon Ichikawa was intrigued by the narrative, but was more interested in transforming the fairy tale tone to a realistic film, and secured Takeyama's permission. Ichikawa likened his desire to make the film to "a call from the heavens".

Ichikawa met with Takeyama to discuss the story, and was surprised when Takeyama revealed he had never been to Burma, having fought in China during the war. Takeyama explained he planned to write about China, but the music he referenced in his story was not commonly found there. For a screenplay, Ichikawa turned to his wife Natto Wada, who wrote it alone and at a fast pace, but based on her husband's concepts.

=== Filming ===
Ichikawa hoped to make the film in color, but color cameras were too big, and thus costly, to be moved to Burma. Much of the film was shot in Yasui, Hakone and the Izu Peninsula in Japan.

Ichikawa rigorously followed his storyboards in shooting the film. Ichikawa also told Shoji Yasui to lose weight to portray the underfed character. The harp featured in the film is a prop, rather than a true instrument, with the song used in the film being "Home! Sweet Home!", adapted in Japan as "Hanyo no yado".

== Themes ==
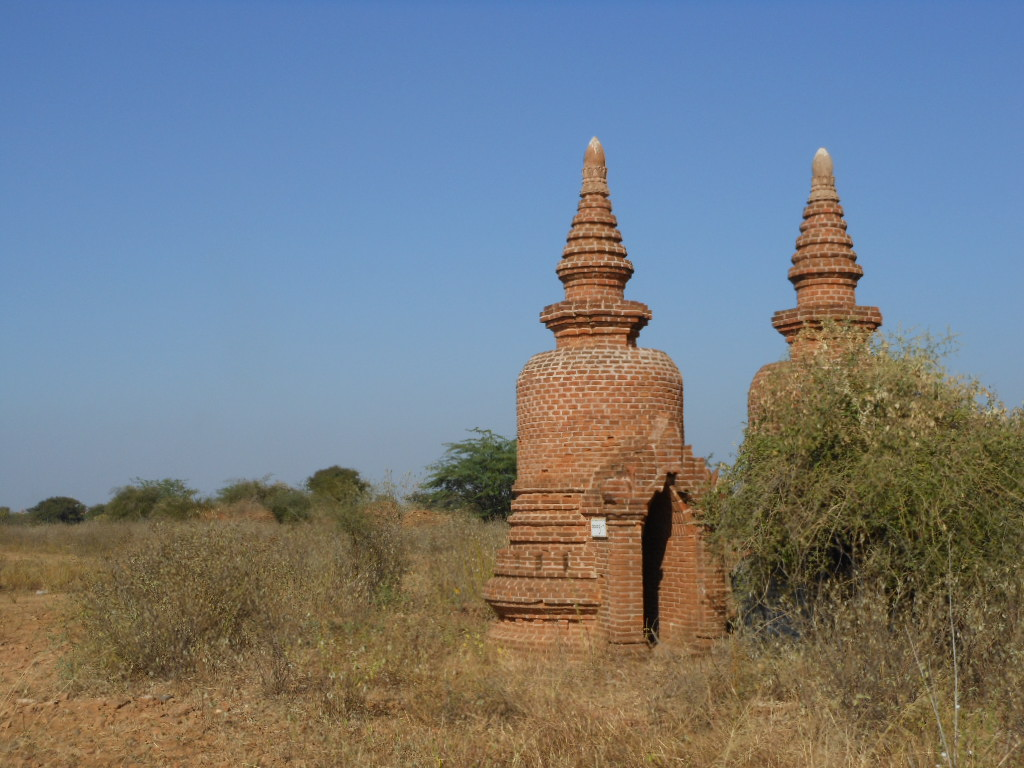
Stupas in Myanmar (Burma).

Buddhism is a major theme in the film, with a monk saying "Burma is Buddha's country." Author Catherine Russell writes that Mizushima, initially stealing a monk's robes and disingenuously posing as a Buddhist monk, becomes more devout. However, Russell argues that Mizushima's Buddhism, in his salute of graves and use of distinctly Japanese boxes, remains a form of Japanese nationalism. Professor Ronald Green argues that Mizushima's mission as a monk to bury Japanese soldiers is a pilgrimage, in which his mounds resemble Buddhist stupas, and his practice of saluting the graves is reminiscent of Buddhist rituals at stupas. The film's visuals also communicate Buddhist messages, with the panoramas in land, and then the ocean at the end of the film, showing the "broadness" of Mizushima's messages. Shots of full moons invoke Buddhist symbols of awakening.

Music is also used in the film to represent the unity between cultural groups and enemies. Singing improves the spirits in Inouye's group, with Inouye trained in music while Mizushima is self-taught in the Burmese harp, an instrument particularly associated with Burma. The group learns the war is over when Mizushima plays "Hanyo no yado", with the British joining in by singing "Home! Sweet Home!"

Home! Sweet Home!
The film includes performances of Henry Bishop's music in both English as "Home! Sweet Home!", and Japanese as "Hanyo no yado".

== Release ==
In Japan, Nikkatsu, the studio that commissioned the film, released the first part of the film on 21 January 1956, running 63 minutes. The second part, running 80 minutes, was released on 12 February, with both parts as double features screened with B movies. It was screened at the Venice International Film Festival in August 1956, where it received an ovation.

It was Ichikawa's first film released internationally, but the 143-minute film was condensed to 116 minutes, reputedly at Ichikawa's objection. Brandon Films' release in English language countries came before the novel was first translated to English. The film was released on DVD in Region 1 by The Criterion Collection in March 2007. The film was released on Blu-ray in Region B/2 by Eureka Entertainment in 2012.

== Reception ==
=== Critical reception ===
The film's initial release was met with positive reviews. In 1993, film scholar Audie Bock praised Ichikawa's use of "the Burmese landscape and the eerie power of its Buddhist statuary and architecture to sustain the mood of Mizushima's conversion and the mystification of his Japanese comrades." Bock also emphasized the friendship between the soldiers. In 1996, Kevin Thomas of The Los Angeles Times hailed it as "one of the great anti-war films".

In 2002, the BBC commented The Burmese Harp was "one of the first films to portray the decimating effects of World War II from the point of view of the Japanese army". In 2007, Dave Kehr wrote in The New York Times that despite appearing sentimental, the film "has a clarity of purpose and a simplicity of execution that make it still appealing". That year, film critic Tony Rayns called it the "first real landmark in his career". He wrote it would be impossible for Ichikawa to know about the scale of Japanese war crimes soldiers inflicted in countries such as Burma, with academic Joan Mellen accusing the film of whitewashing. However, Rayns noted the film shows some Japanese soldiers were indeed extremists. Dr. John Henry Smihula further argued the quote "Burma is Buddha's country" could mean that Japanese imperialism is at the root of the suffering of all characters in the film, as Burma belongs only to Buddha and neither Japan nor Britain. In his 2013 Movie Guide, Leonard Maltin gave the film three and a half stars, calling it an "extraordinary antiwar drama".

=== Accolades ===
Award	Date of ceremony	Category	Recipient(s)	Result	Ref(s)
Academy Awards	27 March 1957	Best Foreign Language Film	Masayuki Takagi	Nominated	
Mainichi Film Awards	1956	Best Film Score	Akira Ifukube	Won	
Venice Film Festival	28 August – 9 September 1956	San Giorgio Prize	Kon Ichikawa	Won	
Venice Film Festival	28 August – 9 September 1956	OCIC Award Honorable Mention	Kon Ichikawa	Won	

== Legacy ==
The novel The Burmese Harp includes a scene with cannibals in the war. Although this is not adapted in the film, Ichikawa explored the topic in his 1959 film Fires on the Plain. Both films are noted for being rare in Japanese cinema for focusing on the dark nature of the Asiatic-Pacific Theater.

Ichikawa remade The Burmese Harp in 1985, starring Kiichi Nakai and Kōji Ishizaka. The remake was a major financial success and was the number one Japanese film on the domestic market in 1985. It drew an audience of 3.87 million people, then the second largest Japanese box office hit.

The film was included by the Vatican in a list of important films compiled in 1995, under the category of "Values".

== See also ==
- List of submissions to the 29th Academy Awards for Best Foreign Language Film
- List of Japanese submissions for the Academy Award for Best Foreign Language Film
