= Conflagration (film) =

1958 Japanese film

- Theatrical release poster
- Directed by: Kon Ichikawa
- Written by: Kon Ichikawa; Keiji Hasebe; Natto Wada
- Based on: The Temple of the Golden Pavilion by Yukio Mishima
- Produced by: Masaichi Nagata
- Starring: Raizo Ichikawa; Nakamura Ganjirō II; Tatsuya Nakadai
- Cinematography: Kazuo Miyagawa
- Edited by: Shigeo Nishida
- Music by: Toshiro Mayuzumi
- Production company: Daiei Film
- Distributed by: Daiei Film
- Release date: 19 August 1958 (Japan)
- Running time: 99 minutes
- Country: Japan
- Language: Japanese

Conflagration (Japanese: 炎上, Hepburn: Enjō) is a 1958 Japanese drama film directed by Kon Ichikawa. It is based on the Yukio Mishima novel The Temple of the Golden Pavilion. Ichikawa named Conflagration as the favourite among his own films.

== Plot ==
Set during and shortly after World War II, Goichi, a young Buddhist acolyte, is interrogated after burning down the Shukaku Pavilion in Kyoto. He remains silent throughout the questioning. A flashback occurs with Goichi arriving at the Soen Temple, with a letter of introduction from his deceased father, a monk at the Kan'ei-ji Temple and trusted friend of the high priest, Tayama Dosen. His father had expressed a sentiment that the Golden Pavilion is the most beautiful thing in the world. While preparing rice, Goichi remembers a past incident in which he is mocked for his stuttering. He also recalls witnessing his mother's adultery as a child.

During a visit, Goichi's mother states the wish that he might one day become the head priest at the temple. He doubts her ambitions as he feels he might be drafted into the war. One weekend, during a tourist attraction, Goichi sees a pregnant woman with a visiting American soldier. The woman tries to enter the pavilion, but he pushes the woman down the stairs causing her to miscarry. He confesses the deed to Tayama, who was already aware of it and has paid off the woman. Another flashback occurs with Togari, who has a crippled leg, discussing Goichi's academic decline at the Kotani University and his love for ancient temples. Togari follows Goichi into the monachism and has Ranko, a geisha, treat his leg. On another night, Goichi spies on Tayama Dosen, who is accompanied by a woman.

During a scripture reading, the kōan of Nanquan and the cat is discussed, in which monks from the east and west halls fight over custody of a stray kitten. Nanquan resolves the conflict by beheading the cat. After the reading, Goichi discovers a pin-up photo of a geisha inside Tayama's study book. He confronts the priest, who rescinds his consideration to have Goichi succeed him. Goichi responds that his stutter disqualifies him from being a monk, but Tayama instead accuses him of being twisted. After Goichi purchases a knife and sedatives, Togari loans Goichi ¥3,000, but Goichi fails to repay it in time. Tayama partially repays the loan. Meanwhile, Goichi remembers his father's funeral and cremation. At the pavilion, a police officer suspects Goichi of his suicidal intentions; later that night, his mother reprimands him for it. Back in his room, Togari scolds Goichi and tells him that Tayama sells access to the pavilion for money, much to Goichi's disagreement. Togari's ikebana teacher listens in on the conversation, and after learning of his previous relationship with Ranko, she smashes a vase of flowers on his floor.

Feeling misunderstood, and disillusioned by the monks' secular behavior, Goichi sets fire to the pavilion. Back to the present, the detectives return Goichi to the destroyed remains of the temple. During a transfer to prison, Goichi throws himself from a train.

== Cast ==
- Ichikawa Raizō VIII as Goichi Mizoguchi
- Tatsuya Nakadai as Togari
- Nakamura Ganjirō II as Tayama Dosen
- Michiyo Aratama
- Tamao Nakamura
- Jun Hamamura
- Ryosuke Kagawa as Priest Zenkai
- Tanie Kitabayashi as Aki, Goichi's mother
- Kinzō Shin

== Production ==
Yoshinobu Nishioka served as the film's art director.

== Legacy ==
Conflagration was screened at the Berkeley Art Museum and Pacific Film Archive in 1981, at the Berlin International Film Festival in 2015, and at the Museum of Modern Art in 2018.
