= Jun Hamamura =

Japanese actor (1906–1995)

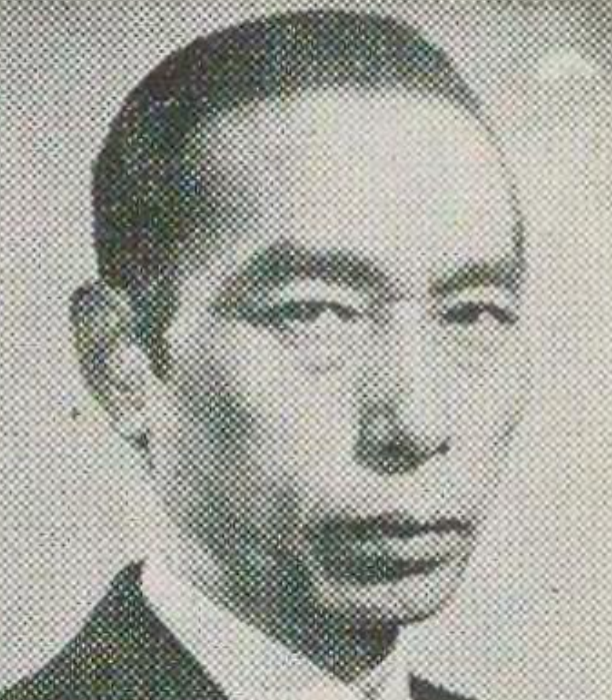
- Hamamura in 1962
- Born: 7 February 1906; Fukuoka, Japan
- Died: 21 June 1995 (aged 89); Tokyo, Japan
- Occupation: Actor
- Years active: 1938-1995

Jun Hamamura (浜村純, Hamamura Jun; 7 February 1906 – 21 June 1995) was a Japanese actor. He appeared in more than 130 films between 1938 and 1995.

== Selected filmography ==
- Wolf (1955)
- The Burmese Harp (1956)
- The Hole (1957)
- The Temptress and the Monk (1958)
- Enjō (1958)
- Odd Obsession (1959)
- Fires on the Plain (1959)
- Her Brother (1960)
- Being Two Isn't Easy (1962)
- Bad Girl (1963)
- A Legend or Was It? (1963)
- The Scent of Incense (1964)
- Taikōki (1965, TV), Hirate Masahide
- Profound Desires of the Gods (1968)
- Samurai Rebellion (1967)
- Double Suicide (1969)
- The Return of Ultraman (1971, TV)
- Daichūshingura (1971, TV)
- Horror Theater Unbalance (1973, TV)
- Ultraman Taro (1973–74, TV)
- Prophecies of Nostradamus (1974)
- Himiko (1974)
- The Gate of Youth (1975)
- Ballad of Orin (1977)
- Kusa Moeru (1979, TV)
- Kofuku (1981)
- Samurai Reincarnation (1981)
- The Burmese Harp (1985)
- Gonza the Spearman (1986)
- Aitsu ni Koishite (1987)
- Takeda Shingen (1988, TV)
- Mr. Baseball (1992)
- Sleeping Man (1996)
