= Natto Wada =

Japanese screenwriter (1920–1983)

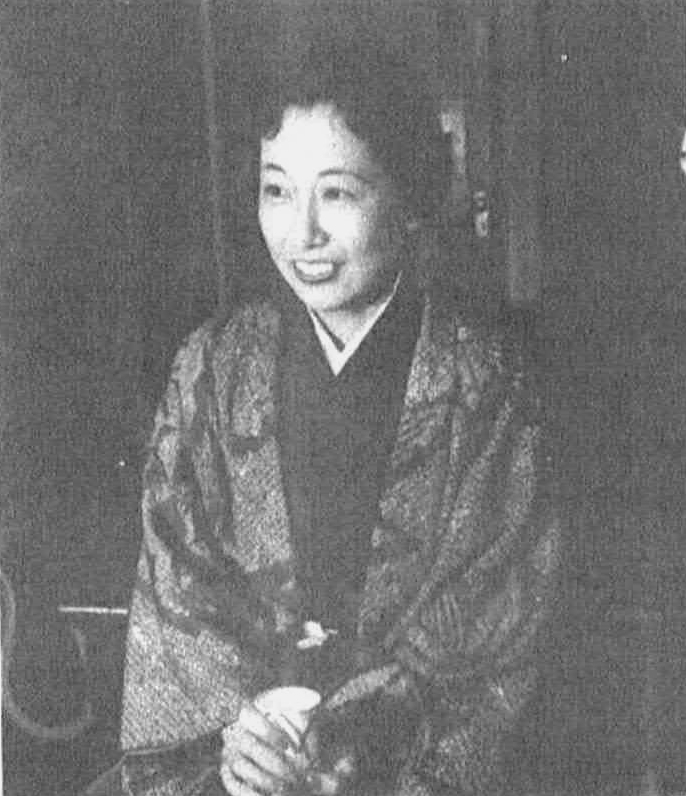
- Wada in 1954
- Born: 13 September 1920; Himeji, Hyogo, Japan
- Died: 18 February 1983 (aged 62)
- Occupations: Screenwriter, columnist
- Spouse: Kon Ichikawa (m. 1948)

Natto Wada (和田 夏十, Wada Natto; 13 September 1920 – 18 February 1983), also known as Natsuto Wada, was a Japanese script writer and film columnist.

== Career ==
Wada graduated with an English degree from Tokyo Women's College in 1946. She started her career at the Fujimoto Cinema Production company, where she met her husband, Kon Ichikawa, a filmmaker who promoted her script work to colleagues and collaborated with her on several films. She began writing, or co-writing, scripts in 1951, and continued until 1965.

=== Films ===
Wada's scripts included the 1953 film Puu-san, a satirical comedy based on the manga of Yokoyama Taizo; the 1956 film Shokei no Heya, based on a novel by Ishihara Shintaro. That year, Wada also wrote Nihonbashi, based on a novel by Izumi Kyoka, which documented the rivalry of two geisha in a male-dominated culture. Kuroi Junin no Onna (Ten Dark Women) was a 1961 film that satirized an egotistical male's reliance on his wife to stay out of trouble. Also that year, Wada wrote Hakai (The Broken Commandment) a film adaptation of Shimizaki Toson's eponymous 1906 novel, which examined the life of a social outcast. Wada's adaptation was notable for strengthening the role of the female protagonist.

Other film scripts by Wada or with collaborators include Biruma no Tategoto (Harp of Burma, 1956), based on the eponymous 1946 novel by Takayama Michio; Enjō (Conflagration, 1959) based on Mishima Yukio's 1956 novel, The Temple of the Golden Pavilion.

=== Columnist ===
Wada was also known for her work as an advice columnist during the 1960s. Her column, "Personal Life Consultation," ran in the Asahi Shimbun.
