= Kon Ichikawa =

Japanese film director and screenwriter (1915–2008)

- 市川 崑
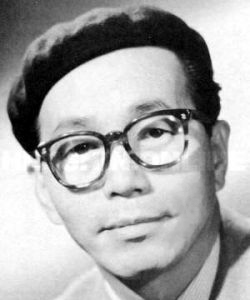
- Ichikawa in the 1950s
- Born: Giichi Ichikawa; 20 November 1915; Ise, Mie, Empire of Japan
- Died: 13 February 2008 (aged 92); Tokyo, Japan
- Occupations: Film director, screenwriter
- Years active: 1936–2008
- Notable work: The Burmese Harp (1956); Odd Obsession (1959); Fires on the Plain (1959); An Actor's Revenge (1963); Tokyo Olympiad (1965)
- Spouse: Natto Wada (m. 1948; died 1983)

Kon Ichikawa (市川 崑, Ichikawa Kon; 20 November 1915 – 13 February 2008) was a Japanese film director and screenwriter. His work displays a vast range in genre and style, from the anti-war films The Burmese Harp (1956) and Fires on the Plain (1959), to the documentary Tokyo Olympiad (1965), which won two BAFTA Film Awards, and the 19th-century revenge drama An Actor's Revenge (1963). His film Odd Obsession (1959) won the Jury Prize at the 1960 Cannes Film Festival.

At his death in 2008, The New York Times recalled that "The Globe and Mail, the Canadian newspaper, called him in 2001 “the last living link between the golden age of Japanese cinema, the spunky New Wave that followed and contemporary Japanese film.”"

== Biography ==
=== Early life ===
Ichikawa was born in Ise, Mie Prefecture as Giichi Ichikawa (市川儀一). His father died when he was four years old, and the family kimono shop went bankrupt, so he went to live with his sister. He was given the name Kon by an uncle who thought the characters in the kanji 崑 signified good luck, because the two halves of the Chinese character look the same when it is split in half vertically.

As a child, Ichikawa loved drawing and his ambition was to become an artist. He also loved films and was a fan of "chambara" or samurai films. In his teens he was fascinated by Walt Disney's "Silly Symphonies" and decided to become an animator. He attended a technical school in Osaka. Upon graduation, in 1933, he found a job with a local rental film studio, J.O Studio, in their animation department. Decades later, he told the American writer on Japanese film Donald Richie, "I'm still a cartoonist and I think that the greatest influence on my films (besides Chaplin, particularly The Gold Rush) is probably Disney."

=== Film career ===
He moved to the feature film department as an assistant director when the company closed its animation department, working under directors including Yutaka Abe and Nobuo Aoyagi.

In the early 1940s J.O Studio merged with P.C.L. and Toho Film Distribution to form the Toho Film Company. Ichikawa moved to Tokyo. His first film was the puppet play A Girl at Dojo Temple (Musume Dojoji 1946), which was confiscated by the interim U.S. Occupation authorities under the pretext that it was too "feudal", but some sources suggest the script had not been approved by the occupying authorities. Thought lost for many years, it is now archived at the Cinémathèque Française.

It was at Toho that he met Natto Wada. Wada was a translator for Toho. They agreed to marry sometime after Ichikawa completed his first film as director. Natto Wada's original name was Yumiko Mogi (born 13 September 1920 in Himeji, Hyōgo Prefecture, Japan); the couple both had failed marriages behind them. She graduated with a degree in English literature from Tokyo Woman's Christian University. She married Kon Ichikawa on 10 April 1948, and died on 18 February 1983 of breast cancer.

Ichikawa was among the first group of Toho staff that broke from the labor union during the Toho strikes, which became part of Shintoho. Due to a shortage of directorial talent at the new company, he made his debut as director with A Thousand and One Nights with Toho.

It was after Ichikawa's marriage to Wada that the two began collaborating, first on Design of a Human Being (Ningen moyo) and Endless Passion (Hateshinaki jonetsu) in 1949. The period 1950–1965 is often referred to as Ichikawa's Natto Wada period. It's the period that contains the majority of Ichikawa's most highly respected works, such as Tokyo Olympiad (Tōkyō Orinpikku), for which he was awarded the Olympic Diploma of Merit, as well as the BAFTA United Nations Award and the Robert Flaherty Award (now known as the BAFTA Award for Best Documentary). It is also during this period that Wada wrote 34 screenplays, most of which were adaptations.

He gained Western recognition during the 1950s and 1960s with two anti-war films, The Burmese Harp and Fires on the Plain, and the technically formidable period-piece An Actor's Revenge (Yukinojo henge) about a kabuki actor.

Among his many literary adaptations were Jun'ichirō Tanizaki's The Key (Kagi), Natsume Sōseki's The Heart (Kokoro) and I Am a Cat (Wagahai wa neko de aru), in which a teacher's cat critiques the foibles of the humans surrounding him, and Yukio Mishima's Conflagration (Enjo), in which a priest burns down his temple to save it from spiritual pollution. The Key, released in the United States as Odd Obsession, was entered in the 1960 Cannes Film Festival, and won the Jury Prize with Antonioni's L'Avventura.

After Tokyo Olympiad Wada retired from screenwriting, and it marked a significant change in Ichikawa's films from that point onward. Concerning her retirement, he said "She doesn't like the new film grammar, the method of presentation of the material; she says there's no heart in it anymore, that people no longer take human love seriously."

In 1969, he along with Akira Kurosawa , Masaki Kobayashi, and Keisuke Kinoshita formed the Yonki-no-kai Productions company.

His final film, 2006's Inugamis, a remake of Ichikawa's own 1976 film The Inugami Family, was entered into the 29th Moscow International Film Festival.

Also in 2006, Ichikawa was the subject of a feature-length documentary, The Kon Ichikawa Story, directed by Shunji Iwai.

Ichikawa died of pneumonia on 13 February 2008 in a Tokyo hospital. He was 92 years old.

The Magic Hour marked Ichikawa's last appearance and was dedicated to his memory. (This message can be seen in the end of this film.) In this film, a movie director played by Ichikawa is shooting Kuroi Hyaku-ichi-nin no Onna ('A hundred and one dark women'), a parody of Ten Dark Women.

== Filmography ==
Year	English title	Japanese title	Romanized title	Notes	Ref
1935	Cowardly Samurai Squad		Yowamushi Chinsengumi	Animated short film	
1945	A Girl at Dojo Temple		Musume Dōjōji	Puppet film	
1947	A Thousand and One Nights with Toho	東宝千一夜	Tōhō sen'ichiya		
1948	A Flower Blooms		Hana hiraku		
1948	365 Nights		Sanbyaku-rokujūgoya		
1949	Human Patterns		Ningen moyō	Also known as Design of a Human Being	
1949	Passion Without End		Hateshinaki jōnetsu		
1950	Sanshiro of Ginza		Ginza Sanshirō	Also known as A Ginza Veteran	
1950	Heat and Mud		Netsudeichi	Also known as The Hot Marshland or Money and Three Bad Men	
1950	Pursuit at Dawn		Akatsuki no tsuiseki	Also known as Police and Small Gangsters	
1951	Nightshade Flower		Ieraishan		
1951	The Sweetheart		Koibito	Also known as The Lover	
1951	The Man Without a Nationality		Mukokuseki-sha		
1951	Stolen Love		Nusumareta koi		
1951	Bengawan Solo		Bengawan Solo		
1951	Wedding March		Kekkon kōshinkyoku		
1952	Mr. Lucky		Rakkī-san		
1952	Young People		Wakai hito	Also known as The Young Generation	
1952	The Woman Who Touched Legs		Ashi ni sawatta onna	Remake of Yutaka Abe's 1926 film of the same name	
1952	This Way, That Way		Ano te kono te		
1953	Mr. Pū		Pū-san	Based on a comic book	
1953	The Blue Revolution		Aoiro kakumei		
1953	The Youth of Heiji Zenigata		Seishun Zenigata Heiji		
1953	The Lover		Aijin		
1954	All of Myself		Watashi no subete o	Also known as All About Me	
1954	A Billionaire		Okuman chōja		
1954	Twelve Chapters About Women		Josei ni kansuru jūnishō		
1955	Ghost Story of Youth		Seishun kaidan		
1955	The Heart	こころ	Kokoro		
1956	The Burmese Harp	ビルマの竪琴	Biruma no tategoto		
1956	Punishment Room		Shokei no heya		
1957	Bridge of Japan		Nihonbashi		
1957	The Crowded Street Car		Man'in densha	Also known as A Full-Up Train or The Crowded Train	
1957	The Men of Tohoku		Tōhoku no zunmutachi		
1957	The Hole	穴	Ana	Also known The Pit or Hole in One	
1958	Conflagration	炎上	Enjō		
1959	Goodbye, Hello		Sayonara, konnichiwa		
1959	Odd Obsession	鍵	Kagi	Also known as The Key	
1959	Fires on the Plain	野火	Nobi		
1960	A Woman's Testament	女経	Jokyō	Directed the second segment	
1960	Bonchi		Bonchi		
1960	Her Brother	おとうと	Otōto		
1961	Ten Dark Women	黒い十人の女	Kuroi jûnin no onna		
1962	The Broken Commandment		Hakai	Also known as The Outcast or The Sin	
1962	Being Two Isn't Easy	私は二歳	Watashi wa nisai	Also known as I Am Two	
1963	An Actor's Revenge	雪之丞変化	Yukinojō henge	Also known as Revenge of a Kabuki Actor	
1963	Alone Across the Pacific	太平洋ひとりぼっち	Taiheiyō Hitori-botchi	Also known as My Enemy the Sea	
1964	Money Talks		Dokonjo monogatari: Zeni no odori	Also known as The Money Dance	
1965	Tokyo Olympiad	東京オリンピック	Tōkyō Orinpikku	Documentary	
1967	Topo Gigio and the Missile War	トッポ・ジージョのボタン戦争	Toppo Jîjo no botan sensō	Puppet film	
1968	Youth: The 50th National High School Baseball Tournament		Seishun	Documentary	
1968	Kyoto: Heart of Japan	京	Kyōto	Short documentary	
1970	Japan and the Japanese		Nihon to Nihonjin	Short documentary, also known as Mt. Fuji	
1971	To Love Again	愛ふたたび	Ai futatabi		
1972–1973	Kogarashi Monjirō	木枯し紋次郎	Kogarashi Monjirō	Television series	
1973	The Wanderers	股旅	Matatabi		
1973	Visions of Eight			Documentary, segment: "The Fastest"	
1975	I Am a Cat		Wagahai wa neko de aru		
1976	Between Women and Wives		Tsuma to onna no aida		
1976	The Inugami Family	股旅	Inugami-ke no ichizoku	Also known as The Inugamis; first film starring Kōji Ishizaka as Kosuke Kindaichi	
1977	The Devil's Ballad		Akuma no temari-uta	Also known as Rhyme of Vengeance; second film starring Kōji Ishizaka as Kosuke Kindaichi	
1977	Island of Horrors		Gokumontō	Also known as Hell's Gate Island or The Devil's Island; third film starring Kōji Ishizaka as Kosuke Kindaichi	
1978	Queen Bee	女王蜂	Joōbachi	fourth film starring Kōji Ishizaka as Kosuke Kindaichi	
1978	Phoenix	火の鳥	Hi no Tori		
1979	The House of Hanging	病院坂の首縊りの家	Byōinzaka no kubi kukuri no ie	Fifth film starring Kōji Ishizaka as Kosuke Kindaichi	
1980	Ancient City	古都	Koto	Also known as The Old Capital	
1981	Lonely Heart	幸福	Kōfuku	Also known as Happiness	
1983	The Makioka Sisters	細雪	Sasame-yuki		
1984	Ohan	おはん	Ohan		
1985	The Burmese Harp	ビルマの竪琴	Biruma no tategoto	Remake of The Burmese Harp	
1986	The Adventures of Milo and Otis	子猫物語	Koneko Monogatari	Associate director	
1986	The Hall of the Crying Deer		Rokumeikan	Also known as High Society of Meiji	
1987	Actress		Eiga joyū	Also known as Film Actress	
1987	Princess from the Moon	竹取物語	Taketori Monogatari		
1988	Crane		Tsuru		
1991	Noh Mask Murders		Tenkawa densetsu satsujin jiken		
1993	The Return of Monjirō Kogarashi	帰って来た木枯し紋次郎	Kaettekita Kogarashi Monjirō	Based on the 1972 television series	
1994	47 Ronin	四十七人の刺客	Shijūshichinin no shikaku		
1996	The 8-Tomb Village		Yatsuhaka-mura		
2000	Shinsengumi		Shinsengumi		
2000	Dora-heita		Dora-heita	Also known as Alley Cat	
2001	Kah-chan	かあちゃん	Kah-chan		
2006	Ten Nights of Dreams		Yume jûya	Segment: "The Second Dream"	
2006	The Inugamis	犬神家の一族	Inugami-ke no ichizoku	Sixth film starring Kōji Ishizaka as Kosuke Kindaichi; remake of The Inugami Family	

== Style and themes ==
Ichikawa's films are marked with a certain darkness and bleakness, punctuated with sparks of humanity.

It can be said that his main trait is technical expertise, irony, detachment and a drive for realism married with a complete spectrum of genres. Some critics class him with Akira Kurosawa, Kenji Mizoguchi and Yasujirō Ozu as one of the masters of Japanese cinema.

== Legacy ==
The Kon Ichikawa Memorial Room, a small museum dedicated to him and his wife Natto Wada displaying materials from his personal collection, was opened in Shibuya in 2015, on the site of his former home.
