= Articulate (TV series) =

- Genre: Documentary series
- Presented by: Jim Cotter
- Country of origin: United States
- Original language: English
- No. of seasons: 9
- No. of episodes: 127

Production
- Production locations: Philadelphia, Pennsylvania, United States
- Running time: 30 minutes
- Production company: Lehigh Valley Public Media

Original release
- Network: Syndication
- Release: 2015 – 2022

Articulate is an American weekly public television documentary series on the creative arts hosted by Irish-American journalist Jim Cotter.

== Background ==
Articulate profiles artists and how they interact with the world around them, with weekly 30-minute episodes on visual arts, crafts, ceramics, music, dance, photography, literature, and many other forms of art and expression. Going beyond art history and culture, Articulate takes an interdisciplinary look at the many different forms of human creative expression and delves into philosophical topics such as the nature of human existence. The television series debuted in 2015, with episodes still currently in production. Articulate’s diverse guests come from around the world; many episodes are filmed on location.

The show's host, Jim Cotter, was born in County Kerry, Ireland. After working for the BBC, Cotter moved to the United States to pursue a career in journalism and television.

== Broadcast history ==
Articulate first premiered on January 8, 2015, and originally aired on WHYY-TV in Philadelphia. It airs on public television stations across the United States, including New Hampshire, Illinois, Colorado, California, Arizona, Texas, and many other states. It is currently broadcast on more than 110 public television stations.

Articulate is currently produced by Panavista, Inc., a Philadelphia-based independent film company which specializes in producing documentaries.

== Awards ==
In 2017, Panavista, Inc. won a Mid-Atlantic Emmy Awards in the Best Historic/Cultural Program Feature/Segment category. The award was for Articulate’s segment, “A Place at the Table,” about woodworker George Nakashima’s daughter, Mira Nakashima.

In 2020, Articulate was nominated for a Daytime Emmy Award in the Outstanding Multiple Camera Editing category, and won the Daytime Emmy Award in the Outstanding Sound Mixing category for the episode “Andrew Bird: Whistling While He Works.”

In 2021, Articulate was nominated for a Daytime Emmy Award in the Outstanding Arts and Popular Culture Program category.

== Episodes ==
Below is a full list of Articulate episodes and featured guests, listed by season.

=== Season 1 (2017) ===
Season 1 episodes and featured guests are:

Episode no.	Segment no.	Segment title	Featured guests
1	1	Tap into America	n/a
1	2	Music with Teeth	Roomful of Teeth
1	3	A Place at the Table	Mira Nakashima
2	1	The Nature of Art	Brandon Ballengée
2	2	Under Pressure	n/a
2	3	The Jazz Sensibilities of Moe Brooker	Moe Brooker
3	1	The Ghetto Potter	Roberto Lugo
3	2	Changing Minds About Climate Change	n/a
3	3	Gerald Busby’s Lust for Life	Gerald Busby
4	1	Sugar Tongue Slim	Sugar Tongue Slim
4	2	Bruce Metcalf	Bruce Metcalf
4	3	Fear of the Known	H.P. Lovecraft
5	1	The Charming Incongruities of Kevin Barnes	Kevin Barnes
5	2	Pictures of You	n/a
5	3	Walé Oyéjidé	Walé Oyéjidé
6	1	Scents and Sensibility	Fabio Luisi
6	2	Found in Translation	n/a
6	3	Elizabeth Streb: Dancing with Danger	Elizabeth Streb
7	1	Watsky on How to Ruin Everything	Watsky
7	2	All the World's A Stage	n/a
7	3	Dindga McCannon	Dindga McCannon
8	1	The Cutting Edge of Stained Glass	Judith Schaechter
8	2	Bodies of Work	n/a
8	3	Eric Owens	Eric Owens
9	1	It Takes Two	n/a
9	2	Krimes and Punishment	Jesse Krimes
9	3	Stephen Costello's Most Valuable Friend	Stephen Costello
10	1	Orchestrating Hits	Larry Gold
10	2	Goldberg Variations; Timeless Virtuosity	n/a
10	3	The Illustrious Kevin Cornell	Kevin Cornell
10	4	Perceptual Shift	Michael Murphy
11	1	Ellen Harvey	Ellen Harvey
11	2	Bharatanatyam: Indian Dance	n/a
11	3	Xenia Rubinos	Xenia Rubinos
12	1	Feminist Fatale	Carsie Blanton
12	2	Matthew Neenan	Matthew Neenan
12	3	Modigliani	Amedeo Modigliani
12	4	Luis Cruz Azaceta	Luis Cruz Azaceta

=== Season 2 (2017) ===
Season 2 episodes and featured guests are:

Episode no.	Segment no.	Featured guests
1	1	Lemony Snicket (Daniel Handler)
1	2	Lisa Hannigan
1	3	Nina Chanel Abney
2	1	Janet Echelman
2	2	Arturo Rios
2	3	n/a
2	4	Justin Bettman
3	1	Ian Brennan
3	2	Nina Berman
3	3	Leroy Johnson
4	1	Gene Yang
4	2	The Struts
4	3	n/a
5	1	Reuben Margolin
5	2	Jennifer Higdon
5	3	Chemi Rosado-Seijo
5	4	Sara Rahbar
6	1	Mark Mothersbaugh
6	2	Liz Casella
6	3	Greg Dunn
7	1	Kyle Abraham
7	2	Maggie Nelson
7	3	Ruth Slenczynska
7	4	Saya Woolfalk
8	1	Christian Scott aTunde Adjuah
8	2	Tommy Pico
8	3	Ron Nagle
8	4	Sidney Hutter
9	1	Jennifer Allora and Guillermo Calzadilla
9	2	Doug Balliet
9	3	Veruschka Stevens
9	4	Daniel Levitin
10	1	Kenny Scharf
10	2	Buffy Sainte-Marie
10	3	n/a
11	1	Michelle Cuevas
11	2	Mason Bates
11	3	Antonio Martorell
12	1	Havana Lyceum Orchestra
12	2	Peter Shire
12	3	n/a
12	4	Elizabeth Turk

=== Season 3 (2018) ===
Season 3 episodes and featured guests are:

Episode no.	Segment no.	Segment title	Featured guests
1	1	Andrew W.K.: The Life and Soul of the Party	Andrew W.K.
1	2	Lauren Greenfield's Wealth of Ideas	Lauren Greenfield
2	1	Caroline Shaw: Of Carnegie and Kanye	Caroline Shaw
2	2	Robert Janz's Disappearing Acts	Robert Janz
2	3	Lizzo's Living Large	Lizzo
3	1	The Irrepressible Joyce DiDonato	Joyce DiDonato
3	2	The Beautiful Mind of !llmind	!llmind
3	3	Context Is The New Content	Kenneth Goldsmith
4	1	Ricky Reed's Good Vibrations	Ricky Reed
4	2	Danzy Senna's Life Isn't Black and White	Danzy Senna
4	3	Donn T's Inferno	Donn T
5	1	The “Can Do” Lab	Do Lab
5	2	The Mother Tongue	Cheryl Boyce-Taylor
5	3	An Old Head On Young Shoulders	Julien Baker
6	1	The United States of Lila Downs	Lila Downs
6	2	The Information Artist	Heather Dewey-Hagborg
6	3	At Home Going Big	Steve Tobin
6	4	The Historical Conquests of Josh Ritter	Josh Ritter
7	1	The Unsanctioned Art of Jim Garland	Jim Garland
7	2	Tank's Soul Pursuit	Tank and the Bangas
7	3	Ani DiFranco: Still a Righteous Babe	Ani DiFranco
8	1	The Renaissance Woman	Shara Nova
9	1	Princesses For Boys	Shannon Hale
9	2	Wu Han: In Concert and Conversation	Wu Han
9	3	Journeys of Mind and Body	Magda Giannikou
10	1	The Recovering	Leslie Jamison
10	2	Actor-Writer-Director-Musician	Josh Radnor
10	3	The Quiet Truths of Luciana Souza	Luciana Souza
11	1	Dance-able	Heidi Latsky
11	2	Mr. Baseman	Gary Baseman
11	3	Bang on a Can: Bringing Downtown Uptown	Bang on a Can
12	1	The Antidote to Hopelessness	Jason Reynolds
12	2	The Prodigy Daughter	Alisa Weilerstein
12	3	Ibeyi	Ibeyi

=== Season 4 (2018) ===
Season 4 episodes and featured guests are:

Episode no.	Episode title	Segment no.	Segment title	Featured guests
1	The Outsiders	1	David Sedaris: This American Treasure	David Sedaris
1	The Outsiders	2	Priscilla Renea: Hits And Misses	Priscilla Renea
1	The Outsiders	3	Jeffrey Gibson: Icon Maker	Jeffrey Gibson
2	It's All Between Their Ears	1	Olivia Laing: Intimate Knowledge	Olivia Laing
2	It's All Between Their Ears	2	Bill Fontana: Hear, Now	Bill Fontana
2	It's All Between Their Ears	3	Tune-Yards: Private Thoughts, Public Person	Merrill Garbus
3	Redefining “Possible”	1	Anthony Roth Costanzo: The Highs Of Masculinity	Anthony Roth Costanzo
3	Redefining “Possible”	2	Kory Stamper: Word By Word	Kory Stamper
3	Redefining “Possible”	3	Robert J. Lang: Know How To Fold ‘Em	Robert J. Lang
4	Roads Less Traveled	1	Tracy K. Smith: Ghost Writing	Tracy K. Smith
4	Roads Less Traveled	2	David Lang: Vanguard Of The Un-Cool	David Lang
4	Roads Less Traveled	3	Open Mike Eagle: Hip-Hope	Open Mike Eagle
5	Journeys in Time & Space	1	The Odyssey: 27 Centuries & Counting	n/a
5	Journeys in Time & Space	2	Kaki King: Notes And Colours	Kaki King
5	Journeys in Time & Space	3	Thi Bui: Creative Refuge(e)	Thi Bui
6	As If By Fate	1	Erika Sanchez: Perfectly Imperfect	Erika Sánchez
6	As If By Fate	2	Masatoshi Izumi: The Soul Of Stones	Masatoshi Izumi
6	As If By Fate	3	Shawn Colvin: Home From A Mission	Shawn Colvin
7	The Wildest Dreamers	1	Taylor Mac: Incorporating Calamity	Taylor Mac
7	The Wildest Dreamers	2	Holly Black: Architect Of Magical Worlds	Holly Black
7	The Wildest Dreamers	3	Vieux Farka Touré: The Fortunate Son	Vieux Farka Touré
8	Articulate in San Francisco	1	Marc Bamuthi Joseph: Stage, Page, Body, Mind	Marc Bamuthi Joseph
9	Unique Perspectives	1	Unique, Nézet-Séguin	Yannick Nézet-Séguin
9	Unique Perspectives	2	Tobias Frere-Jones: A Man Of Letters	Tobias Frere-Jones
9	Unique Perspectives	3	Hayley Kiyoko: High Expectations	Hayley Kiyoko
10	Experiments Gone Right	1	Balkrishna Doshi: Building Compassion	Balkrishna Doshi
10	Experiments Gone Right	2	Radnor & Lee: A Beautiful Bro-Mance	Josh Radnor and Ben Lee
10	Experiments Gone Right	3	Amy Seiwert: Ballet’S Mad Scientist	Amy Seiwert
11	The Seekers	1	They Might Be Giants: Cultivated Eccentricity	n/a
11	The Seekers	2	Sylvia Plath: The Iconic Sad Girl	Sylvia Plath
11	The Seekers	3	Oliver Jeffers: Principled Uncertainty	Oliver Jeffers
12	The Pursuit of New Truths	1	Hélène Grimaud: The Keys To Life	Hélène Grimaud
12	The Pursuit of New Truths	2	Sarah Williams Goldhagen: Welcome To Your World	Sarah Williams Goldhagen
12	The Pursuit of New Truths	3	Scott Mccloud: Constructive Rage	Scott McCloud
13	Articulate in Philadelphia	1	David Finckel: The Chamber Music Maestro	David Finckel
14	Halloween Special	1	Gothic Truth & Fiction	n/a
14	Halloween Special	2	Fear Of The Known	H. P. Lovecraft
14	Halloween Special	3	Our Greatest Fear	n/a
15	Black History Month	1	Sugar Tongue Slim	Sugar Tongue Slim
15	Black History Month	2	Moe Brooker	Moe Brooker
15	Black History Month	3	Dindga Mccannon	Dindga McCannon
16	Valentine's Day	1	Floriography	n/a
16	Valentine's Day	2	Rip Romance?	n/a
16	Valentine's Day	3	It Takes Two	n/a
17	Earth Day	1	Changing Minds About Climate Change	n/a
17	Earth Day	2	The Nature Of Art	Brandon Ballengée
17	Earth Day	3	A Place At The Table	Mira Nakashima

=== Season 5 (2019) ===
Season 5 episodes and featured guests are:

Episode no.	Episode title	Segment no.	Segment title	Featured guests
1	Idealistic Icons	1	Jeff Tweedy: A Romantic Misanthrope?	Jeff Tweedy
1	Idealistic Icons	2	Frank Lloyd Wright: Wright and Wrong	Frank Lloyd Wright
2	Living Legacies	1	Milton Glaser: Designing the Truth	Milton Glaser
2	Living Legacies	2	Camille Brown: The Past is Present	Camille Brown
2	Living Legacies	3	Julia Wolfe Finds Her Place	Julia Wolfe
3	No Frontiers	1	The Carthys: Non-Traditional Folk	Martin Carthy Eliza Carthy
3	No Frontiers	2	Dessa's Dauntless	Dessa Darling
3	No Frontiers	3	Oded Hirsch: At the Borders	Oded Hirsch
4	Transformers	1	Daniel Barenboim: Conducting Change	Daniel Barenboim
4	Transformers	2	Tift Merritt's Transformations	Tift Merritt
4	Transformers	3	Vivek Shraya: Changing for Good	Vivek Shraya
5	Pioneering Spirits	1	Daniel Libeskind Doesn't Hear No	Daniel Libeskind
5	Pioneering Spirits	2	Missy Mazzoli Keeps It Surreal	Missy Mazzoli
5	Pioneering Spirits	3	Elliot Erwitt's Moments In Time	Elliot Erwitt
6	The Standouts	1	Ani Liu: Daughter of Invention	Ani Liu
6	The Standouts	2	Howard Jacobson: Senescence and Sensibility	Howard Jacobson
6	The Standouts	3	Edgar Meyer: Beyond the Bass-ics	Edgar Meyer
7	Andrew Bird Concert Show	1	Andrew Bird: Whistling While He Works	Andrew Bird
8	The Right Left Turns	1	Arthur Yorinks: The Creative Engine	Arthur Yorinks
8	The Right Left Turns	2	Karen Russell's Un-Realities	Karen Russell
8	The Right Left Turns	3	Jason deCaires Taylor: Underwater Museaums	Jason deCaires Taylor
9	Seeking Deeper Truths	1	Gregory Pardlo: Far From The Tree	Gregory Pardlo
9	Seeking Deeper Truths	2	The Tireless Sonya Tayeh	Sonya Tayeh
10	Staying the Course	1	Bill T'Last	Bill T. Jones
10	Staying the Course	2	Lily Allen the Agitator	Lily Allen
10	Staying the Course	3	Michael Bierut: Maverick Brander	Michael Bierut
11	Self Inventors	1	Thomas Heatherwick's Everyday Magic	Thomas Heatherwick
11	Self Inventors	2	Alice McDermott: Of Saints and Scholars	Alice McDermott
11	Self Inventors	3	Dean Friedman: Ariel, Fries, Synthesize	Dean Friedman
12	Of Page and Stage	1	Sarah Ruhl: She Ruhls	Sarah Ruhl
12	Of Page and Stage	2	Michelle Dorrance: Step By Step	Michelle Dorrance
12	Of Page and Stage	3	Ralph Steadman: Godfather of Gonzo	Ralph Steadman
13	Patricia Racette Concert Show	1	Patricia Racette: Enchanting the Muse	Patricia Racette
14	What Matters Most	1	Marina Benjamin Goes All In	Marina Benjamin
14	What Matters Most	2	Stefan Sagmeister: The Pursuit of Happiness and Beauty	Stefan Sagmeister
14	What Matters Most	3	Donald Nally: Voice of Reason	Donald Nally
15	Self, Aside	1	Stephanie Blythe: Uncaged	Stephanie Blythe
15	Self, Aside	2	Diana al-Hadid: Excavating the Muse	Diana al-Hadid
15	Self, Aside	3	What's So Funny About Nick Lowe?	Nick Lowe
16	Through the fire	1	KT Tunstall: From the Ashes	KT Tunstall
16	Through the fire	2	Pam Tanowitz: Out of the Shadows	Pam Tanowitz
16	Through the fire	3	Natasha Trethewey's Redemption	Natasha Trethewey
17	The Incomparable	1	Caroline Shaw in Concert	Caroline Shaw
18	The Headliners	1	Aaron Sorkin's Second Act	Aaron Sorkin
18	The Headliners	2	Rhiannon Giddens' Living History	Rhiannon Giddens
19	Power Through Purpose	1	John Darnielle: From Self-Destruction to Self-Construction	John Darnielle
19	Power Through Purpose	2	Elizabeth Acevedo's Literary Realizations	Elizabeth Acevedo
19	Power Through Purpose	3	Meg Saligman: The Big Picture	Meg Saligman
20	From the Top	1	Jonathan Safran Foer: Illuminating Everything	Jonathan Safran Foer
20	From the Top	2	Nate Powell: Drawing on Experience	Nate Powell
20	From the Top	3	Gustavo Dudamel: Playing Nicely	Gustavo Dudamel
21	Life's Work	1	Perpetual Andrew Motion	Andrew Motion
21	Life's Work	2	Vijay Iyer: Key Changes	Vijay Iyer
21	Life's Work	3	Susan Choi: Interrogator of Truth	Susan Choi
22	The Exceptionals	1	Billy Collins: The People's Poet	Billy Collins
22	The Exceptionals	2	Gemma New: In Name and Nature	Gemma New
22	The Exceptionals	3	Ming Peiffer: Not a "Usual" Girl	Ming Peiffer
23	Beyond the Status Quo	1	Esperanza Spalding's Discipline(s)	Esperanza Spalding
23	Beyond the Status Quo	2	Lee Child: Not "The Man"	Lee Child
23	Beyond the Status Quo	3	Nick Phan: Forging Connection	Nicholas Phan
24	By the Horns	1	Tod Williams and Billie Tsien: Made to Last	Tod Williams Billie Tsien Architects
24	By the Horns	2	Carmen Maria Machado: Claiming Her Space	Carmen Maria Machado
25	Wayfinders	1	Elizabeth Strout: Steady as She Goes	Elizabeth Strout
25	Wayfinders	2	Pamela Frank: Fit as a Fiddle	Pamela Frank
25	Wayfinders	3	The Very Moving Rennie Harris	Rennie Harris
26	The Roots of Creativity	1	Maaza Mengiste: Writing Home	Maaza Mengiste
26	The Roots of Creativity	2	Dick Boak's Eclectic Adventures	Dick Boak
26	The Roots of Creativity	3	Nicola Benedetti: A Great Scot	Nicola Benedetti

=== Season 6 (2020) ===
Season 6 episodes and featured guests are:

Episode no.	Episode title	Segment no.	Segment title	Featured guests
1	The Mirror of Time	1	The Mayor of Harmontown	Dan Harmon
1	The Mirror of Time	2	Stepping Up	Liz Lerman
2	Larger than Life	1	Ellen Reid Packs a Punch	Ellen Reid
2	Larger than Life	2	Vikram Paralkar's Universe	Vikram Paralkar
3	Finding	1	The Multitudes of Gish Jen	Gish Jen
3	Finding	2	Becoming a Newman	Thomas Newman
4	Daniel Hope's Lands of Glory	1	n/a	Daniel Hope
5	Their Way	1	Of Broadway	Jason Robert Brown
5	Their Way	2	The Lady in the Light	Angel Blue
6	From the Mouths of Poets	1	n/a	n/a
7	Drawing Meaning from Life	1	n/a	n/a
8	From Isolation to Ovation	1	A Norwegian, wielding hammers...and strings.	Leif Ove Andsnes
8	From Isolation to Ovation	2	Forthright at the Opera	Royce Vavrek
9	The Monument Man	1	n/a	Zenos Frudakis
10	Paying it Forward	1	No Longer a One Woman Show	Marin Alsop
10	Paying it Forward	2	Musical Wanderer	Ian Bostridge
11	Mario Lanza at 100	1	n/a	Stephen Costello
12	Jets vs. Sharks	1	n/a	n/a
13	Written from Life, Itself	1	Learning from Yearning	Rufus Wainwright
13	Written from Life, Itself	2	The Solo Composer	David Serkin Ludwig

=== Season 7 (2021) ===
Season 7 episodes and featured guests are:

Episode no.	Episode title	Segment no.	Segment title	Featured guests
1	Seeing and Being Seen	1	Taking Kenny Leon Wherever He Goes	Kenny Leon
1	Seeing and Being Seen	2	Drawing the World 'Round	Sophie Blackall
2	Facing Forward	1	The Indomitable Optimist	Claire Chase
2	Facing Forward	2	Democratizer of Design	Mónica Ponce de León
3	Walk a Mile With Me	1	n/a	n/a
4	Breaking Boundaries	1	Her/Herself/She	Joan Armatrading
4	Breaking Boundaries	2	The Trailblazer	Horace Pippin
5	Teddy Abrams in Concert and Conversation	1	n/a	Teddy Abrams
6	Breaking Ground	1	The Skin Is In	Doris Sung
6	Breaking Ground	2	Faithfully, Yuna	Yuna
7	Pain and Patience	1	Pain is Inevitable, Suffering Optional	n/a
7	Pain and Patience	2	Gil Shaham: A Great Violin for a Great Violinist	Gil Shaham
8	Lateral Visions	1	Dystopian Romances	Veronica Roth
8	Lateral Visions	2	A Vision of Music	Amy Yang
9	In the Eye of the Beholder	1	n/a	n/a
10	Finding Meaning	1	Songs of Redemption and Hope	Timothy Showalter
10	Finding Meaning	2	Acting Out	John Jarboe
11	Joseph Conyers in Concert and Conversation	1	n/a	Joseph Conyers
12	The Neverending Story	1	The Science of Story	n/a
12	The Neverending Story	2	To the Future and Beyond	n/a
13	Finding Their Own Way	1	A Young Life in Song	Phoebe Bridgers
13	Finding Their Own Way	2	A Moving Iconoclast	Brian Sanders

=== Season 8 (2021) ===
Season 8 episodes and featured guests are:

Episode no.	Episode title	Segment no.	Segment title	Featured guests
1	Resilience	1	The Wit and Wisdom of Garry Trudeau	Garry Trudeau
1	Resilience	2	The Purposeful Life of Joyce Carol Oates	Joyce Carol Oates
2	Making Her Way	1	n/a	Natalie Merchant
3	Taking Time	1	Darin Strauss: A Present Passed	Darin Strauss
3	Taking Time	2	Steven Mackey: The Purposeful Life of Joyce Carol Oates	Steven Mackey
4	Indefatigables	1	Valerie June: Sometimes Down, Never Out	Valerie June
4	Indefatigables	2	Stephen Petronio Tells It From a Mountain	Stephen Petronio
5	Worlds of Words	1	Tochi Onyebuchi: The Search for Better Worlds	Tochi Onyebuchi
5	Worlds of Words	2	Stephen Powers: Thoroughly Modern Cave Painter	Stephen Powers
6	A Place of Their Own	1	Sarah Gancher: The Funny Thing About Grief	Sarah Gancher
6	A Place of Their Own	2	Jay Ungar & Molly Mason: A Sense of Place	Jay Ungar & Molly Mason
7	Singular Purpose	1	The Rhymes and Reason of Terrance Hayes	Terrance Hayes
7	Singular Purpose	2	Anthony McGill: Blowing It Up	Anthony McGill
8	Triumph Over Affliction	1	Deborah Eisenberg: Love Without Haste	Deborah Eisenberg
8	Triumph Over Affliction	2	Shira Erlichman: Be/Hold	Shira Erlichman
9	Displacement	1	David Gray's Life in Slow Motion	David Gray
9	Displacement	2	Nowhere Man	Aleksandar Hemon
10	Self Realization	1	Yiyun Li: From Her Life to Ours	Yiyun Li
10	Self Realization	2	Miguel Gutierrez: Age and Beauty	Miguel Gutierrez
11	Virtuous Reality	1	Yusef Komunyakaa: War and Peace	Yusef Komunyakaa
11	Virtuous Reality	2	Jennifer Weiner: Mrs. Everything	Jennifer Weiner
12	Reflexive Cognition	1	The Frolics and Detours of Paul Muldoon	Paul Muldoon
12	Reflexive Cognition	2	Daniel Arsham: Connecting Time	Daniel Arsham
13	What Might Be	1	The Visions of Chip	Samuel R. Delany
13	What Might Be	2	The Explorations of Orkhan Telhan	Orkan Telhan

=== Season 9 (2022) ===
Season 9 episodes and featured guests are:

Episode no.	Episode title	Segment no.	Segment title	Featured guests
1	From Prodigies to Paragons	1	Wonderings and Wanderings	Yaa Gyasi
1	From Prodigies to Paragons	2	A Soon-To-Be-Former Child Prodigy	Sarah Jarosz
2	Unremitting	1	The Persistence of Reverie	Kate DiCamillo
2	Unremitting	2	Intents and Purposes	Ping Chong
3	Fearless Pursuits	1	Adventures in Time and Space	Michael Cunningham
3	Fearless Pursuits	2	Speaking Their Language	Joan Naviyuk Kane
4	By Their Stars	1	The Pressure Machine	The Killers
4	By Their Stars	2	A Man For All Seasons	Mark Morris
4	By Their Stars	3	Finding Connection	Augustin Hadelich
5	Long and Winding Roads	1	The Slow Road	Anaïs Mitchell
5	Long and Winding Roads	2	The High Road	Douglas Stuart
6	The Insatiables	1	An Inquiring Heart and Mind	Stephen Schwartz
6	The Insatiables	2	Intensely Inquistive	Susan Orlean
7	Conscientious Evolution	1	Knowing His Place	Ben Folds
7	Conscientious Evolution	2	Nurturing Nature	Jeanne Gang
8	Crossing Cultures	1	Music Without Boundaries	Time for Three
8	Crossing Cultures	2	Classically Contemporary	Akram Khan
9	Home and Away	1	What She Wants From Herself	Aoife O'Donovan
9	Home and Away	2	A Natural Collaboration	Sara Zewde
