= Stella Zambalis =

American spinto soprano (born 1957)

Stella Zambalis (born July 1957) is an American spinto soprano born in Cleveland, Ohio. She has been called one of the best sopranos in the world today.

== Education and early career ==
Zambalis graduated from Clearwater High School in 1975. She began her studies with Greek mezzo-soprano Elena Nikolaidi at Florida State University. Zambalis moved to Houston along with Nikolaidi where she became a member of the Houston Grand Opera young artist program. She was the 1983 winner of the Metropolitan Opera National Council Auditions. She began her career as a mezzo-soprano and switched to soprano in the mid-1990s.

== Recordings ==
She can be heard on the 1984 Leonard Bernstein recording of West Side Story, 1992 Metropolitan Opera recording of Mozart's Marriage of Figaro (Levine), Tchaikovsky's Romeo and Juliet: Overture Fantasy for Bridge Records and on Dvorak's three complete solo song cycles for the Opus record label.

== On video ==
- Seattle Opera's War and Peace
- 1992 Metropolitan Opera's Marriage of Figaro, Mozart, James Levine Conducting
- PBS's The Making of West Side Story

== Roles ==
She created the role of the stepmother in Robert Moran's and Philip Glass' The Juniper Tree and reprised the role in its New York City debut April 2007 at Lincoln Center. In January 2007 she debuted as Bellini's Norma (opera) for Mercury Opera In Rochester NY. She frequently performs the role of Nedda in I Pagliacci as well as all of the Puccini heroines.

- Mimi in La Bohème, Deutsche Oper Berlin/New York City Opera/Opera Company of Philadelphia/Baltimore Opera/Opera Columbus/Kentucky Opera/Arizona Opera/Michigan Opera/Opera Pacific/Tulsa Opera/Arkansas Symphony
- Floria Tosca in Tosca, Columbus (debut)/Tacoma Opera/Fargo Morehead/Chattanooga Symph & Opera/Arkansas Symphony/others
- Cherubino (Created) in John Corigliano's The Ghosts of Versailles, Metropolitan Opera
- Rosina in Il Barbiere di Siviglia, New York City Opera/Deutsche Oper Berlin/Indianapolis/Opera Theater of Saint Louis/others (at least 23 total productions)
- Magda in La Rondine, New York City Opera
- The Three Heroines in Les Contes d’Hoffmann, Opera Columbus/New York City Opera/Chautauqua Opera/Knoxville Opera
- Giulietta in Les Contes d’Hoffmann, Tulsa Opera
- Micaela in Carmen, New York City Opera/Michigan Opera/Minnesota Opera/Tulsa Opera
- Zerlina in Don Giovanni, Houston Grand Opera/Opera Omaha/Indianapolis Opera
- Dorabella in Cosi fan Tutte, Houston Grand Opera/Seattle Opera
- Musetta in La Bohème, Houston Grand Opera
- Nedda in I Pagliacci, Houston Grand Opera/Opera Co. of Philadelphia/Portland Opera/Arizona Opera/New Orleans Opera
- Sophie in Prokofieff's War and Peace, Seattle Opera
- Norma in Norma, Mercury Opera Rochester
- Adalgisa in Norma, Florida Grand Opera/Opera Hamilton
- Violetta in La Traviata, Austin Lyric Opera
- Countess in Le Nozze di Figaro, Festival of Two Worlds in Spoleto, Italy/Austin Lyric Opera/Opera Hamilton/San Antonio Symphony
- Angelina in La Cenerentola, Florentine Opera
- Liu in Turandot, Indianapolis Opera/Nashville Opera/Florentine Opera/Tulsa Opera/Chattanooga
- Hermia in A Midsummer Night’s Dream, Minnesota Opera/Kentucky Opera
- Donna Elvira in Don Giovanni, Kentucky Opera/Indianapolis Opera
- Fiordiligi in Cosi fan Tutte, Kentucky Opera
- Pamina in The Magic Flute, Opera Company of Philadelphia
- Rosalinda in Die Fledermaus, Opera Company of Philadelphia/Houston Grand Opera/Tacoma Opera/Arizona Opera
- Donna Elvira in Don Giovanni, Opera Company of Philadelphia/Chattanooga Opera/Opera Omaha
- Donna Anna in Don Giovanni, Knoxville Opera/Chattanooga/
- "Soprano" in Carmina Burana, Portland Opera
- Marguerite in Faust, Portland Opera
- double bill of Pagliacci and Carmina Burana, Opera Omaha
- Trouble in Tahiti, La Scala
- Donna Anna in Don Giovanni, Chattanooga Symphony and Opera
- Inez in Maria Padilla, Opera Omaha
- The Stepmother (created) in Philip Glass and Robert Moran's The Juniper Tree, Opera Omaha
- Euridice in Gluck's Orfeo ed Euridice, Indianapolis Opera
- Giovanna Seymour in Anna Bolena, Indianapolis Opera
- Hanna in The Merry Widow, Indianapolis Opera/San Antonio Symphony
- Violetta in La Traviata, Austin Lyric/Madison Opera
- Lucy Lockett in The Beggar's Opera, Opera Theater of Saint Louis
- Angelina, Opera Theater of Saint Louis
- Tessa in The Gondoliers, Opera Theater of Saint Louis
- Valencienne in The Merry Widow, Opera Theater of Saint Louis
- Sara in Roberto Devereux, Opera Orchestra of New York in Carnegie Hall
- Walter in La Wally, Opera Orchestra of New York in Carnegie Hall

== Roles created ==
- Cherubino in The Ghosts of Versailles Metropolitan Opera, John Corigliano
- The Stepmother in Philip Glass' and Robert Moran's The Juniper Tree (Reprised at Lincoln Center for New York Premier 2007)
- The Woman in Robert Moran's Desert of Roses Houston Grand Opera
- The title role in the world premiere of Rachel for the Knoxville Opera, with additional performances in Nashville with Nashville Opera

== Concert performances ==
- Beethoven's "Missa Solemnis", Santiago, Chile
- Strauss' "Four Last Songs", Houston, Pittsburgh and San Francisco Ballets
- Solo Quartet of Brahms' "Liebeslieder Waltzes with Mischa and Cipa Dichter", Houston Symphony
- Soprano Soloist with the late Robert Shaw in Verdi's Requiem in New York with the Little Orchestra Society
- Youngstown Symphony in the Mozart Requiem
- Multiple appearances with the New Bedford Symphony Orchestra as guest soloist
- Erie Symphony for a New Year's Day concert
- Greenville Symphony in Verdi's Requiem
- Houston Masterworks for Beethoven's "Symphony No. 9" and Vaughan Williams' "Benedicite"
- Festival of Two Worlds in Spoleto, Italy as soprano soloist in Menotti's Mass and his Cantata to St. Teresa of Avila: Muero, Porque no Muero, which she also performed with the Radio Symphony Orchestra of Berlin
- Featured soloist under the baton of Raphael Frubech de Burgos in Rossini's Stabat Mater with the Rundfunk Symphony Orchestra in Berlin
