= Richard Egielski =

American illustrator and writer

Richard Egielski (born July 16, 1952 in New York City) is an American illustrator and writer who has worked on more than fifty children's picture books, eight of which he authored. He received his education at Parson's School of Design.

== Career ==
Egielski's collaboration with Arthur Yorinks resulted in nine picture books, including Hey, Al, which was awarded the Caldecott Medal in 1987. He is also known for his illustrations in the Tub People series by Pam Conrad.

The New York Times named Buz, a book he wrote and illustrated in 1995, one of the top ten best children's books of the year for its illustrations. Jazper, which he illustrated, was also recognized as a New York Times Best Illustrated Book in 1998.

Egielski's artwork is displayed in private and public collections, as well as corporate collections, throughout the United States.

== Personal life ==
Egielski currently lives in Milford, New Jersey with his wife, Denise Saldutti, who is also an artist and illustrator, and their son. He is of Polish-American heritage.

== Selected books by or illustrated by Egielski ==
- The Letter, the Witch, and the Ring (1976), by John Bellairs, a novel
- The Molly Series by Miriam Chaikin, 1979-1988
- Louis the Fish (1980), by Arthur Yorinks
- Amy's Eyes (1985), by Richard Kennedy, a novel
- Hey, Al (1986), by Arthur Yorinks
- The Tub People (1989), by Pam Conrad
- Buz (1995) by Egielski
- The Gingerbread Boy (1997), by Egielski
- Jazper (1998), by Egielski
- The Tub People's Christmas (1999), by Pam Conrad
- The Web Files (2001), by Margie Palatini
- Slim and Jim (2002), by Egielski
- The Fierce Yellow Pumpkin (2003), by Margaret Wise Brown
- The Small World of Binky Braverman (2003) by Rosemary Wells
- The End (2007), by David LaRochelle
- Homework (2009), by Arthur Yorinks
- Gumption! (2010), by Elise Broach
- The Sleepless Little Vampire (2011), by Egielski
- Itsy Bitsy Spider (2012), by Egielski
