= Arthur Yorinks =

American author (born 1953)

- Born: August 21, 1953 (age 73); Roslyn, New York, U.S.
- Occupations: Author; librettist; playwright; director
- Writing career
- Period: 1977–present
- Genres: Picture books; children's literature: fantasy
- Notable work: Hey, Al
- Website: www.arthuryorinks.com

Arthur Yorinks (born August 21, 1953) is an American author, playwright and director. He is best known for writing Hey, Al, which won a Caldecott Medal.

== Early life ==
Arthur Yorinks was born on August 21, 1953, in Roslyn, New York. He was raised in a suburban area of the village. His father, Alexander, was a mechanical engineer and his mother, Shirley, was a fashion illustrator. His aunt was also a piano teacher and his friend an illustrator and Yorinks considers this artistic childhood as an important inspiration for his later career. When he was six, he started to practice to be a classical pianist. His piano teacher, Robert Bedford, influenced him and is credited with instilling in him both perfectionism and a professionalism. Yorinks said that he "learned a great deal of what it means to be an artist" from Bedford.

When Yorinks was in high school, he discovered picture books and he particularly liked the works of Tomi Ungerer, William Steig, and especially Maurice Sendak. Later Yorinks said "Discovering Tomi Ungerer, William Steig, particularly Maurice Sendak, was a turning point. I was already a young adult, and I saw clearly that their books weren't just kids books. They were for everyone. They had such depth and excitement and had everything I was interested in—drama, pictures, rhythm, music." At sixteen, he approached Sendak's studio with manuscripts, picture books and asked Sendak for advice. The two became friends as a result of the encounter and Sendak later introduced Yorinks to Richard Egielski. Yorinks and Egielski became frequent collaborators. Yorinks graduated from high school one year early and chose not to go to college. He took classes at the New School for Social Research and Hofstra New College in 1971.

== Career ==
In 1971 Yorinks began working for The American Mime Theatre after studying ballet and dancing. He also worked as a theater arts instructor at Cornell University from 1972 to 1979. In 1977, he worked with Egielski, whom Sendak had introduced, on the book Sid and Sol. In 1979, he founded The Moving Theatre where he was the artistic director and a writer. The theater produced plays at various venues, such as South Street Theater and Theater of the Open Eye as well as many other theaters.

Yorinks continued to work with Egielski, collaborating on Louis the Fish (1980), which was inspired by Franz Kafka's The Metamorphosis. They also worked on It Happened in Pinsk (1983), Hey, Al (1986), and Bravo Minski (1988) together. Hey Al won a Caldecott Medal.

Yorinks wrote librettos for operas, such as The Juniper Tree by Philip Glass and Robert Moran in 1985 and The Fall of the House of Usher, composed by Glass in 1988.

Yorinks also worked with other illustrators aside from Richard Egielski, such as Maurice Sendak, William Stieg, Mort Drucker, David Small, and Martin Matje. In 1988, he released Company's Coming, illustrated by David Small. In 1990, Yorinks again released a book with Egielski as illustrator, titled Ugh. In the same year, he also worked with Sendak to create The Night Kitchen Theater, a national children's theater.

In 1994 he worked with Drucker on Whitefish Will Rides Again!. In 1995, Yorinks released The Miami Giant, which was illustrated by Sendak. He also adapted one of his plays, So, Sue Me to a picture book format with Sendak, which was published in 1996. In 1999 he wrote another book illustrated by Drucker, titled Tomatoes from Mars. In the same year he released The Alphabet Atlas, illustrated by Adrienne Yorinks. In 2001 he released a sequel to Company's Coming, titled Company's Going, illustrated by Small.

Yorinks has written over 40 audio plays. He has also directed Tom Stoppard's radio plays and has adapted numerous works for radio, such as Franz Kafka's The Metamorphosis, Charles Dickens's A Christmas Carol, and Garson Kanin's The Rat Race. In 2012 he made an adaptation of Zora Neale Hurston's Their Eyes Were Watching God to celebrate the 75th anniversary of the book's publication.

In 2014 New York Public Radio commissioned Yorinks to create a 4-hour audio play adaptation of James Joyce's Dubliners entitled Dubliners: A Quartet. In 2018 Sendak's Presto and Zesto In Limboland was published posthumously, in which Yorinks was writer. In 2019 he appeared in season 5, episode 8 of the PBS show Articulate.

In February 2020 Yorinks published One Mean Ant, the sequel One Mean Ant with Fly and Flea was published in October 2020. He released the third book in the series One Mean Ant with Fly and Flea and Moth in October 2021.

In 2022 he was named artistic director of the American Mime Theatre. In October 2024, Yorinks left AMT and founded and became artistic director of APT, American Physical Theater, a performing company comprising a unique blend of acting, movement, voice, silence, sound and theatrical visual elements. Its premiere production, The Lifeboat was performed at Harlem Stage in March 2025.

== Selected works ==
=== Books ===
- Sid and Sol (illustrated by Richard Egielski), New York: Farrar, Straus, and Giroux, 1977.
- Louis the Fish (illustrated by Richard Egielski), New York: Farrar, Straus, and Giroux, 1980.
- It Happened in Pinsk (illustrated by Richard Egielski), New York: Farrar, Straus, and Giroux, 1983.
- Hey, Al (illustrated by Richard Egielski), New York: Farrar, Straus, and Giroux, 1986.
- Bravo, Minski (illustrated by Richard Egielski), New York: Farrar, Straus, and Giroux, 1988.
- Company's Coming (illustrated by David Small), New York: Crown, 1988.
- Ugh (illustrated by Richard Egielski), New York: Farrar, Straus, and Giroux, 1990.
- Whitefish Will Rides Again! (illustrated by Mort Drucker), New York: HarperCollins, 1994.
- The Miami Giant (illustrated by Maurice Sendak), New York: HarperCollins, 1995.
- Frank and Joey Go to Work (illustrated by Maurice Sendak), New York: HarperFestival, 1996.
- Tomatoes from Mars (illustrated by Mort Drucker), New York: HarperCollins, 1999.
- The Alphabet Atlas (illustrated by Adrienne Yorinks, letter art by Jeanyee Wong), Delray Beach, Florida: Winslow Press, 1999.
- Company's Going (illustrated by David Small), New York: Hyperion, 2001.
- One Mean Ant, Candlewick Press, 2020 ISBN 978-0763683948
- One Mean Ant with Fly and Flea, Candlewick Press, 2020 ISBN 978-0763683955
- One Mean Ant with Fly and Flea and Moth, Candlewick Press, 2021 ISBN 978-0763683962

=== Librettos ===
- The Juniper Tree (music by Philip Glass and Robert Moran), New York: Dunvagen Music, 1985, produced at the American Repertory Theater, Boston, MA, 1985.
- The Fall of the House of Usher, (music by Philip Glass) produced at American Repertory Theater, Boston, MA, May 1988.

=== Audio plays ===
- Their Eyes Were Watching God (2012)
- A Christmas Carol
- The Rat Race
- Metamorphosis
