= The Fall of the House of Usher (Glass opera) =

1988 opera by Philip Glass

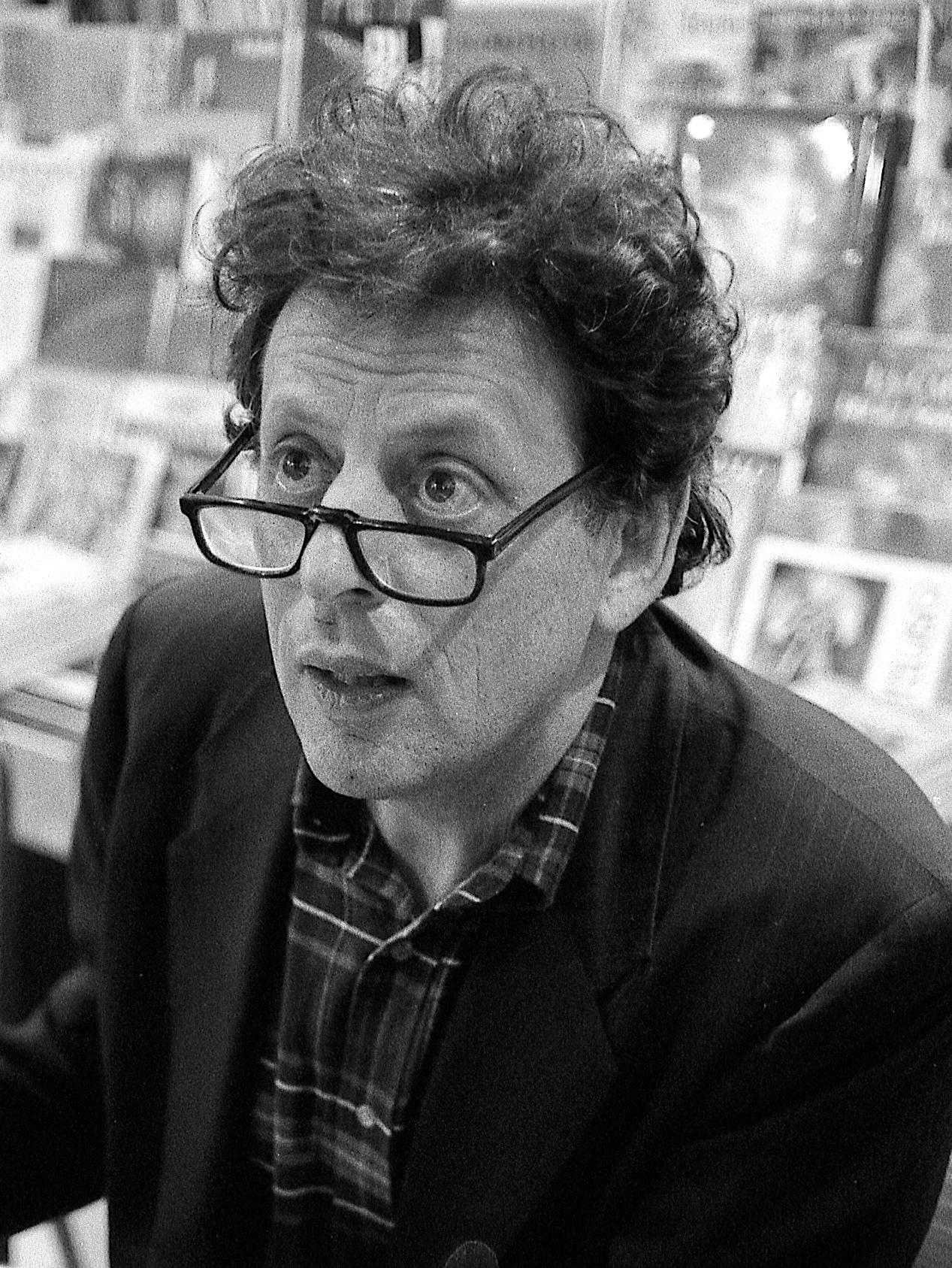
Philip Glass in 1993

The Fall of the House of Usher is a 1988 opera by Philip Glass to a libretto based on Edgar Allan Poe's 1839 short story by Arthur Yorinks who also worked with Glass on The Juniper Tree.

Since its 1988 staging in Cambridge, Glass's opera has been mounted by numerous opera companies, including Chamber Made Opera with the Ariel New Music Ensemble in 1990 (Australia), Long Beach Opera (California), Wolf Trap Opera (Virginia), Cottbus (Germany), and the renowned Maggio Musicale Festival in Florence (Italy).

The Fall of the House of Usher was staged in Florence during the "Maggio Musicale Fiorentino" Festival in May 1992, conducted by Marcello Panni and staged by Richard Foreman in presence of the author in the city's Teatro della Pergola.
