= From the Towers of the Moon =

Opera by Robert Moran

From the Towers of the Moon is an opera in one act by Robert Moran, with a libretto by Michael John LaChiusa. It is based on the classic Japanese tale Princess Kaguya, or The Tale of the Bamboo Cutter, which tells of a princess from the Moon who comes to Earth. Moran knew the story as The Tale of the Shining Princess and had seen a film adaptation of the legend, Princess from the Moon, made by Kon Ichikawa in 1987.

Moran's third opera, it was commissioned and premiered by the Minnesota Opera in 1992. Four excerpts, written for string quartet, were recorded as "Music from the Towers of the Moon" by the Balanescu Quartet.

== Performance history ==
The opera premiered on the March 27, 1992 at the Minnesota Opera, in a production conducted by David Rudge and directed by Nic Muni. The part of the Emperor was performed by baritone Peter Halverson; the part of the girl was performed by Elisabeth Comeaux. Assistant conductor was Carl Witt.

While librettist Michael John LaChiusa was an artist-in-residence at the University of North Carolina, UNC Opera presented the U.S. east coast premiere of the opera.

Music from the Towers of the Moon was performed in a new string orchestra version in April 2008, at the State University of New York, Fredonia, conducted by David Rudge.

Most recently, the opera was produced in April 2024 by Opera Chapman at the Musco Center for the Arts, directed by Marc Callahan and conducted by Danko Druško.

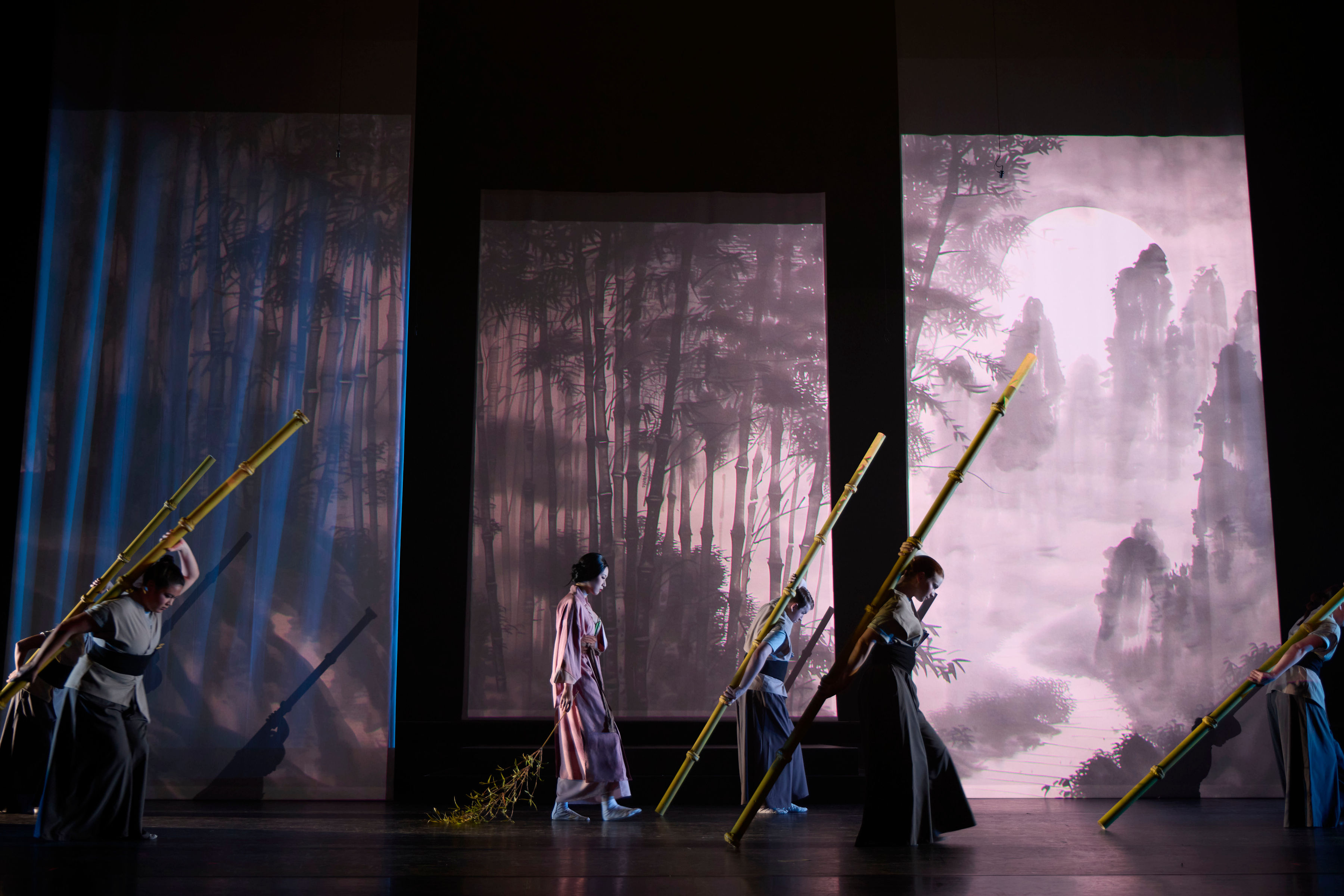

The opera is approximately 80 minutes duration, and is scored for flute/piccolo, oboe/English horn, clarinet/bass clarinet, bassoon, trumpet, horn, trombone, three synthesizers, one percussionist: one timpani, triangle, two suspended cymbals (high and low), large tam, suspended car coil, vibraphone, chimes, two timbales, two sets of bongos (low to high, only 3 bongos used) two violins, viola, and cello (or strings without bassi).

== Synopsis ==
The story of the opera relates how an exceptionally beautiful moon goddess came to Earth and was confronted with human emotions when she falls in love with an Emperor before returning to the Moon. In the finale, the Moon princess, accompanied by Moon gods, departs from her cosmic abode to return to Earth.

== Recordings ==
Balanescu Quartet, Byrne/Moran/Lurie/Torke, ARGO label of London Records, October 1992.

== Adaptations ==
In 1993, the opera was adapted as a contemporary dance piece called Four Towers by choreographer Christopher House for the Toronto Dance Theatre.

Four Towers was inspired by House's first hearing of Moran's music for From the Towers of the Moon and was created for Toronto Dance Theatre's twenty-fifth anniversary season. The first solo was performed by Laurence Lemieux, the trio by Naoko Murakoshi, Miriane Braaf, and Bill Coleman, and the second solo by Coralee McLaren.
