= Zak's Lunch =

1998 book by Margie Palatini

- Front cover
- Author: Margie Palatini
- Language: English
- Publisher: Clarion Books/ Houghton Mifflin Company
- Publication date: 1998
- Publication place: United States
- Pages: 32
- ISBN: 0-395-81674-2
- OCLC: 36847783
- Dewey Decimal: [E] 21
- LC Class: PZ7.P1755 Zak 1998

Zak's Lunch is a children's book written by Margie Palatini and illustrated by Howard Fine. Published by Clarion Books, it is about a boy named Zak who refuses to eat the ham and cheese sandwich his mother made for him for lunch and goes into his imagination of a restaurant.

== Summary ==
Zak's mother calls him to come eat lunch. Zak and his dog, George, enter the kitchen. Zak's mother gives him a ham and cheese sandwich, and Zak tells his mother he doesn't want to eat it. His mother tells him "this is not a restaurant" and that she wants to see that sandwich gone.

Zak imagines that he and George are in a restaurant called Zak's Place. He begins ordering food from the waitress, Lou. Cookie, the cook, makes Zak a cheeseburger deluxe with a pound of pickles. Zak goes on to order French Fries, a pizza, chicken, a tub of spaghetti with meatballs the size of baseballs, hot dogs with chili, and nachos with cheese. After their lunch, they have dessert: a mountain of vanilla and a hill of chocolate.

Zak's mother begins calling Zak's name, and George's bark brings Zak out of his imagination. His mother tells him again that she wants to see that sandwich gone. When his mother turns around, Zak feeds George the sandwich, and successfully tricks his mother.
