= Piggie Pie! =

1995 book by Margie Palatini

First edition (publ. Clarion Books)

Piggie Pie! is a children's picture book by Margie Palatini, illustrated by Howard Fine, published by Clarion Books/Houghton Mifflin Company. The book was followed by two sequels, Zoom Broom! (1998) and Broom Mates (2003) (both published by Hyperion Books for Children).

== Plot ==
Gritch the Witch wants to make one of her favorite meals - piggie pie - but she lacks the crucial ingredients of piggies. Heading to Old McDonald's Farm, she attempts to find some piggies, but the pigs dress up as various barnyard creatures and even Old McDonald, claiming there are no pigs. Foiled, she stumbles upon the Big Bad Wolf, and the two head to Gritch's house, each thinking of eating the other for lunch.

== Reception ==
Ann A. Flowers, of Horn Book Magazine reviewed the book saying, "Extremely amusing and certain to be appreciated by young listeners of the more robust sort". Dawn Friedman, of Common Sense Media reviewed the book saying "With sly tributes to at least three popular kids stories (Wizard of Oz, Old MacDonald, and The Three Little Pigs), this is sure to be a popular read-aloud — and with adult help, kids can get in on the jokes, too".

It was the 1998 winner of the Bill Martin Jr. Picture Book Award of the Kansas Reading Association. Piggie Pie is ranked number 37 on the 2007 National Education Association list of "Teachers' Top 100 Books for Children."

== Nominations & awards ==
- 1998-1999 Buckaroo Book Award nominee
- 1998 Bill Martin Jr. Picture Book Award
- 1998 Golden Sower Award nominee
- 1998 CRYM Award nominee
- 1997-1998 Black-Eyed Susan Book Award
- 1997-1998 Young Hoosier Award Nominee for K-3
- 1997 Mockingbird Award Winner
- 1997 Kentucky Bluegrass Award
- 1997 Red Clover Award
- 1997 Colorado Children's Book Award Winner
