= Margie Palatini =

American writer

- Born: Edison, New Jersey
- Known for: Children's Literature
- Notable work: Zak's Lunch
- Children: 1
- Website: www.margiepalatini.com

Margie Palatini is an American author of children's picture books. She was born in Edison, New Jersey, and lives in nearby Plainfield, New Jersey. Palatini is a graduate of the Moore College of Art and Design in Philadelphia, Pennsylvania.

== Books ==
- Piggie Pie (1995, illustrated by Howard Fine)
- Zak's Lunch (1998, illustrated by Howard Fine)
- Goldie Is Mad (2001)
- The Web Files (2001, illustrated by Richard Egielski)
- Tub-Boo-Boo (2001, illustrated by Glin Dibley)
- The Perfect Pet (2001, illustrated by Bruce Whatley)
- Earthquack! (2002, illustrated by Barry Moser)
- Moo Who? (2004, illustrated by Keith Graves)
- The Three Silly Billies (2005, illustrated by Barry Moser)
- Gone with The Wand (2009, illustrated by Brian Ajhar)
- Lousy Rotten Stinkin' Grapes (2009, illustrated by Barry Moser)
