= Hey, Al =

1986 picture book by Arthur Yorinks

- Author: Arthur Yorinks
- Illustrator: Richard Egielski
- Cover artist: Egielski
- Language: English
- Genre: Children's book
- Publisher: Farrar, Straus, Giroux
- Publication date: 1986
- Publication place: United States
- ISBN: 978-0-374-33060-6
- OCLC: 14990971
- Dewey Decimal: [E] 19
- LC Class: PZ7.Y819 He 1986

Hey, Al is a children's book written by Arthur Yorinks and illustrated by Richard Egielski. Published by Farrar, Straus and Giroux in the year 1986, the book won the Caldecott Medal for illustration in 1987.

== Synopsis ==
Al is a friendly janitor who lives with his dog, Eddie, in a small apartment on the West Side in New York City. However, their lives are rather unpleasant due to the apartment's small size and lack of space. One day while Al is shaving, a large bird pokes his head in through the bathroom window and invites both Al and Eddie to live on a large, tropical island in the sky. Al is hesitant to accept the offer, but Eddie convinces him to do so.

The following day, the large bird flies Al and Eddie to the island. Both janitor and dog are immediately fascinated by the island's scenery and are warmly welcomed by the local birds. For days, Al and Eddie live peacefully on the island and believe it to be paradise. One morning, however, Al and Eddie are horrified to discover that, as a result of staying on the island, they are gradually turning into birds. Realizing their mistake, Al and Eddie use their newly-acquired bird abilities to fly home. During the flight, their abilities start to disappear, but Eddie, exhausted, crashes into the sea. After returning home, Al is devastated over Eddie's disappearance until Eddie, being a talented swimmer, manages to swim back home to Al. Reinvigorated, Al and Eddie live out their lives happily, deciding that "paradise lost is sometimes heaven found".

Awards
Preceded by The Polar Express	Caldecott Medal recipient 1987	Succeeded by Owl Moon
