= Princess from the Moon =

1987 film by Kon Ichikawa

- Theatrical release poster

Japanese name
- Kanji: 竹取物語
Transcriptions
- Revised Hepburn: Taketori Monogatari
- Directed by: Kon Ichikawa
- Written by: Kon Ichikawa; Shinya Hidaka; Mitsutoshi Ishigami; Ryûzô Kikushima
- Based on: The Tale of the Bamboo Cutter
- Produced by: Tomoyuki Tanaka
- Starring: Toshiro Mifune; Kyōko Kishida; Ayako Wakao; Kiichi Nakai
- Cinematography: Setsuo Kobayashi
- Edited by: Chizuko Osada
- Music by: Kensaku Tanikawa
- Production companies: Toho; Fuji Television
- Distributed by: Toho
- Release dates: September 14, 1987 (US); September 26, 1987 (Japan)
- Running time: 121 minutes
- Country: Japan
- Language: Japanese
- Budget: ¥2 billion
- Box office: ¥2.47 billion

Princess from the Moon (竹取物語, Taketori Monogatari; lit. The Tale of the Bamboo Cutter) is a 1987 Japanese film directed by Kon Ichikawa. It is based on The Tale of the Bamboo Cutter, a 10th-century Japanese fairy tale about a girl from the Moon who is discovered as a baby inside the stalk of a glowing bamboo plant.

== Plot ==
One day bamboo cutter Taketori-no-Miyatsuko (Toshiro Mifune) discovers a baby girl while he is out in the forest, visiting his daughter's grave. Not wanting to leave the infant to die and because of her resemblance to his dead daughter, he takes the child home with him- only to discover that the child grows at an extraordinarily fast rate. Incredibly beautiful, the now grown child Kaya (Yasuko Sawaguchi) attracts the attention of everyone around her, including the land's Emperor. Unwilling to accept their advances, Kaya gives the men a list of increasingly difficult tasks. By the film's end Kaya returns to outer-space by way of a space ship.

== Cast ==
- Toshiro Mifune as Taketori-no-Miyatsuko
- Yasuko Sawaguchi as Kaya, the Princess Kaguya
- Ayako Wakao as Tayoshime
- Koji Ishizaka as Mikado
- Kiichi Nakai as Otomo-no-Dainagon or Minister of the Military
- Megumi Odaka as Akeno
- Katsuo Nakamura as Lise
- Takeshi Katō as Fujiwara-no-Okuni
- Kyōko Kishida as Kougo
- Jun Hamamura as Sakanoue-no-Dajo-Daijin
- Koasa Shunpitei as Kuramochi-no-Miko or Minister of Culture
- Takatoshi Takeda as Abe-no-Udaijin or Minister of Finance
- Shirō Itō as Sojo-no-Doson
- Fujio Tokita as Shonin-no-Uda
- Hirokazu Yamaguchi as Metal Carver
- Gen Idemitsu as Mura-no-Choja
- Michiyo Yokoyama as Lise's Wife
- Hirokazu Inoue as Ono-no-Fusamori
- Miho Nakano as Kaya

== Background ==
The film was released as Toho's 55th Anniversary Film in 1987. Ichikawa noted that he had wanted to make this film for many years, and said his intention was to make it a "film of pure diversion". The film was selected as the opening film of the Tokyo International Film Festival, where it was not well received by critics. Toho promoted the film heavily, and it had the second highest theatrical returns of any film that year, but its financial performance did not equal that of Ichikawa's 1985 release Harp of Burma.

== Reception ==
A review in the Los Angeles Times stated: "You wonder awhile whether the moon girl is some wish-fulfillment dream of the subservient, unassertive Japanese women--here made into a god. Yet, like all legends, this one is capable of different inflections. Part of the film is a corrosive assault on brutal ruling classes and wily, opportunistic aristocrats, and it’s infused with the same qualities--idealism, social iconoclasm, artistry and almost unobtrusive visual beauty--that mark most of Ichikawa’s movies. And, if “Princess of the Moon” (Times-rated: Family) pales beside its American equivalents as a piece of special-effects pyrotechnics, it rises above most of them as a celebration of the power of love, the pull of fantasy and the beauty of innocence and moonlight."

=== Awards and nominations ===
- 1988, won Japanese Academy Awards Newcomer of the Year for Megumi Odaka
- 1988, won Japanese Academy Awards Best Art Direction for Shinobu Muraki
- 1988, won Japanese Academy Awards Special Award for Teruyoshi Nakano, Kenichi Eguchi, Yasuyuki Inoue, Takeshi Miyanishi, Kazunobu Sanpei, Eiichi Asada, Kohei Mikami, and Hiroshi Shirakawa
- 1988, nominated Japanese Academy Awards Best Film
- 1988, nominated Japanese Academy Awards Best Director for Kon Ichikawa
- 1988, nominated Japanese Academy Awards Best Cinematography for Setsuo Kobayashi
- 1988, nominated Japanese Academy Awards Best Editing for Chizuko Osada
- 1988, nominated Japanese Academy Awards Best Lighting for Kazuo Shimomura
- 1988, nominated Japanese Academy Awards Best Music Score for Kensaku Tanikawa
- 1988, nominated Japanese Academy Awards Best Sound for Teiichi Saito and Tetsuya Ohashi
- 1988, nominated Japanese Academy Awards Best Supporting Actor for Toshiro Mifune

== Soundtrack ==
"Stay with Me" - Peter Cetera

== See also ==
- From the Towers of the Moon, an opera inspired by the film
- The Tale of the Princess Kaguya, a 2013 anime film by Studio Ghibli also directly retelling the folk tale
