= Amy's Eyes =

1985 novel by Richard Kennedy

- First edition
- Author: Richard Kennedy
- Illustrator: Richard Egielski
- Genre: Fantasy
- Publisher: Harper & Row
- Publication date: 1985
- Pages: 437
- ISBN: 978-0060232191

Amy's Eyes is a children's fantasy novel by Richard Kennedy, published by Harper & Row in 1985, and illustrated by Richard Egielski.

== Plot summary ==
The narrative begins in an orphanage where Amy inadvertently brings her sailor doll to life. It continues on a ship where he has become captain and she has transformed into a doll herself. The book is principally a coming-of-age tale and a nautical adventure involving pirates and the search for lost treasure. The story contains whimsical elements such as a sailing ship crewed by Mother Goose animals, but also has darker themes including the obsession with Biblical prophecy and numerology.

== Reception ==
The book won the Parents' Choice Picture Book Award in 1985 and was the subject of a major review in The New York Times. The Kirkus Reviews described it as "a treasure hunt of true and false clues and intriguing puzzles, and reads like a breeze".
