= Richard Kennedy (author) =

American writer (1932–2025)

Richard Jerome Kennedy (December 23, 1932 – July 24, 2025) was an American writer of children's books and a supporter of the Oxfordian theory of Shakespeare authorship. He was the first to suggest that John Ford was the author of the 578-line poem A Funeral Elegy which in 1995 had been touted by Donald Foster as being written by William Shakespeare.

== Background ==
Kennedy attended Portland State University, where he graduated with a B.A. in liberal arts in 1958. He additionally earned a teaching certificate in elementary education from the University of Oregon. However, he found teaching elementary school unsatisfactory, so he tried other jobs, including bookstore owner, deep sea fisherman, moss picker, custodian, cab-driver, and archivist, before turning to writing.

Kennedy died on July 24, 2025, at the age of 92.

== Shakespeare authorship question ==
Kennedy was a long-time advocate of the theory that Edward de Vere, 17th Earl of Oxford, was the person actually responsible for writing the works of William Shakespeare. He was a founding member of the Shakespeare Fellowship, and in 2005 he proposed that Shakespeare's Stratford monument was originally built to honor John Shakespeare, William's father, who by tradition was a "considerable dealer in wool".

== Notable works ==
- The Porcelain Man, illus. Marcia Sewall, 1976
- The Blue Stone, illus. Ronald Himler, 1976
- The Dark Princess, illus. Donna Diamond, 1978
- Amy's Eyes, illus. Richard Egielski, 1985

== Awards ==
- American Library Association Notable Book List, 1976, for The Blue Stone
- American Library Association Notable Book List, 1978, for The Dark Princess
- Pacific Northwest Booksellers Association Award, 1976, for The Blue Stone and The Porcelain Man
- Association of Logos Bookstores Award, 1985, for Amy's Eyes
- German Rattenfänger (Rat Catcher, i.e. Pied Piper) award as best foreign book translated in 1988 for Amy's Eyes
