= Orkan Telhan =

German artist (born 1976)

Orkan Telhan (born 1976 in Oberhausen, West Germany) is an artist, designer, and researcher whose work explores the intersections of biological systems, emerging technologies, and computation. He is an Associate Professor of Art + Design at Northeastern University and core faculty at the Quantum Materials and Sensing Institute. He also serves as the board president of Biodesign Challenge. He was previously the Chief Information and Data Officer at Ecovative, where he led the Data Systems and Intelligence group, and Associate Professor of Fine Arts, Emerging Design Practices in the School of Design at the University of Pennsylvania.

Telhan holds a PhD in Design and Computation from MIT's Department of Architecture. He was part of the Sociable Media Group at the MIT Media Laboratory and a researcher at the MIT Design Laboratory. He studied Media Arts at the University at Buffalo and theories of media and representation, visual studies and Graphic Design at Bilkent University.

His individual and collaborative work has been exhibited internationally in venues, including the Venice Biennale of Architecture, Triannale di Milano, Istanbul Biennial (2013, 2023), Istanbul Design Biennial (2012 2016 2020), Milano Design Week, Vienna Design Week, the Armory Show 2015 Special Projects, Ars Electronica, ISEA, LABoral, ArchiLab, Architectural Association, The Architectural League of New York, MIT Museum, Museum of Contemporary Art Detroit, New Museum of Contemporary Art, Philadelphia Museum of Art, Walker Art Center, Design Museum, and Museo Reina Sofia.

In 2016, Telhan's design monograph "Designature: The Nature of Signatures in Art and Design" was published from Revolver Publishing, Berlin.

Telhan was a co-founder of Biorealize Inc., a biotech company specialized in making next generation tools to make it easier to design with biology.
