= Ian Brennan (sculptor) =

British artist

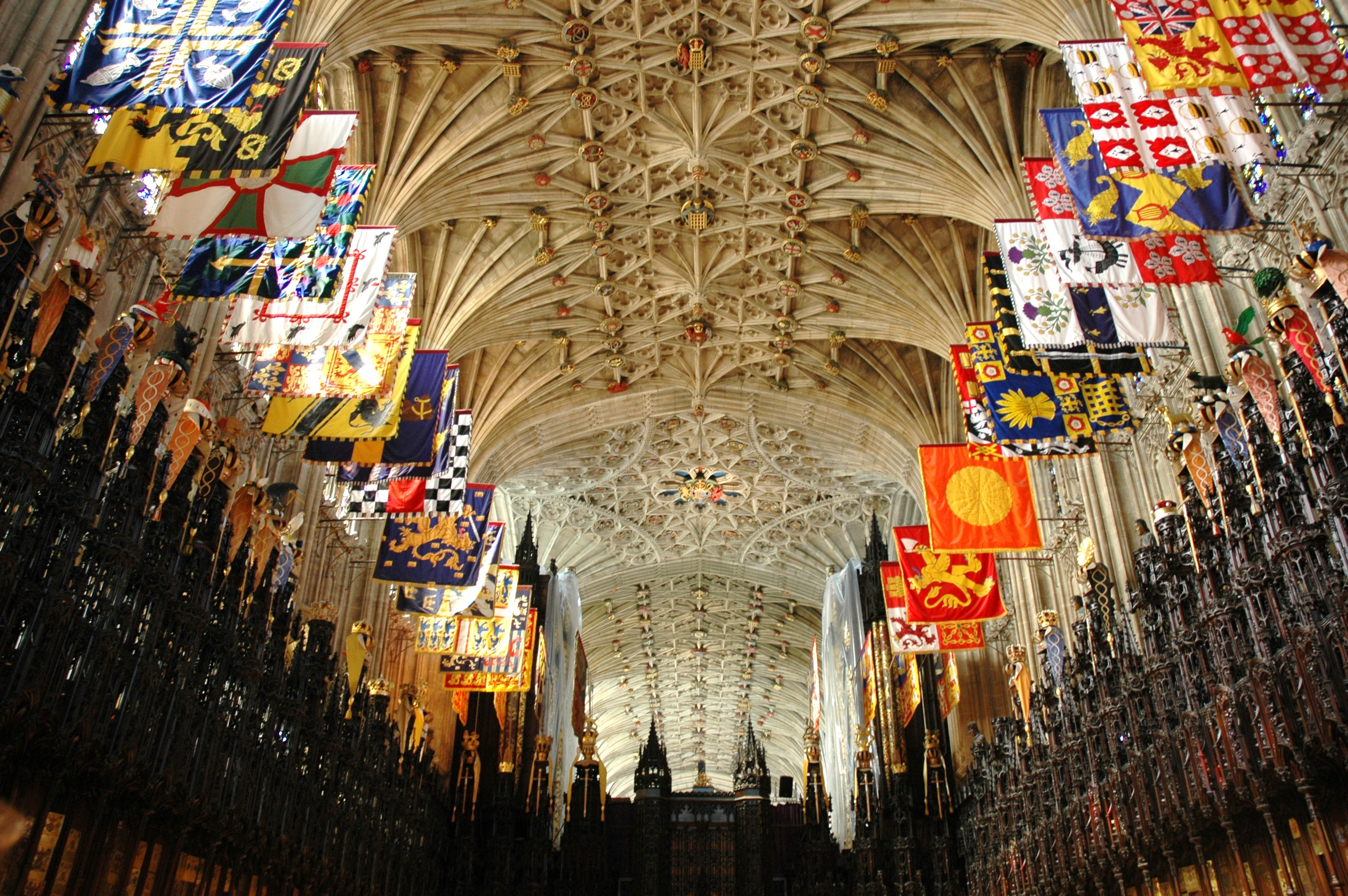
The choir of St George's Chapel, where the banners and crests of the Knights of the Garter are displayed

Ian G. Brennan (born 1950) is the official sculptor to the Most Noble Order of the Garter and Most Honourable Order of the Bath. Brennan has received over ninety-five commissions for the Royal Household; these include over seventy-five carved and painted crowns, coronets and crests. Those of the Garter knights have been installed in St George's Chapel at Windsor Castle. Those of the Knights of the Bath have been installed in Henry VII Lady Chapel at Westminster Abbey.

== Royal commissions ==
Brennan's commissions in both wood and bronze for the British Royal Household have drawn other patrons. In the nearly 30 years since his appointment as official sculptor to Britain's two most prestigious orders, the artist has completed commissions for the King of Spain, the Queen of the Netherlands, the King of Norway and the Emperor of Japan.

=== Order of the Garter ===
Over the course of decades, a number of newly created crests carved by Brennan have been positioned above the knights' choir stalls (seats) in St George's Chapel, including those of royals such as the Duke of Cambridge and prime ministers such as Margaret Thatcher. The gilded chrysanthemum crest of Emperor Akihito represented a somewhat different artistic challenge than is normally posed by the conventions of European heraldry.

Brennan has also been asked to replace some of the older carvings in the chapel which have become damaged or missing. Among the restored Garter crests are those of King Frederik IX of Denmark, King Gustav VI Adolf of Sweden and Emperor Haile Selassie of Ethiopia.

=== Order of the Bath ===
Brennan carved the crest for the Prince of Wales, Great Master of the Order of the Bath. Other crests created by Brennan for Knights of the Bath include those of Sir Douglas Lowe, Sir Neil Wheeler and Sir Anthony Griffin.

== Other commissions ==
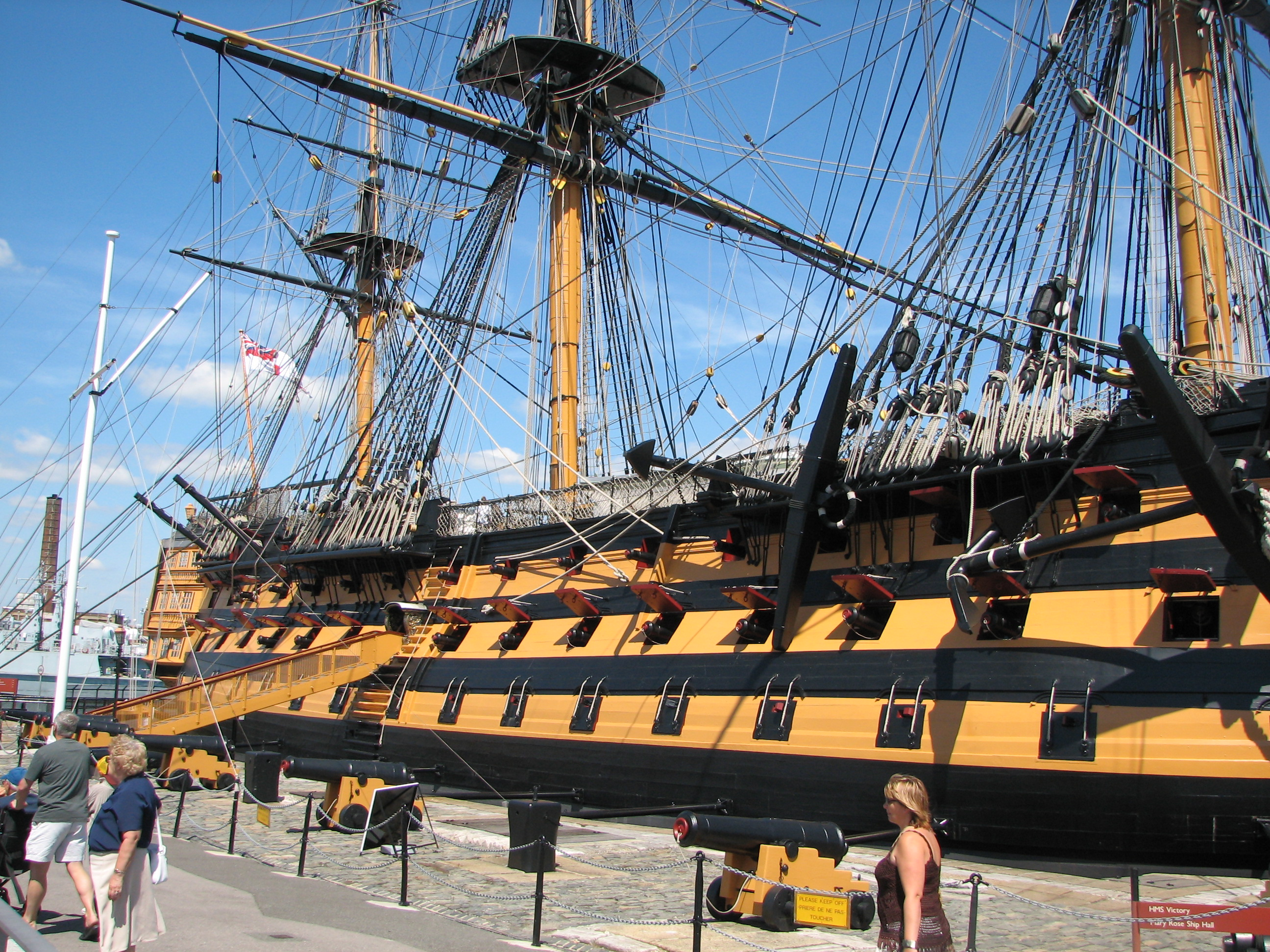
Brennan's carving is featured around the entrance port on the middle gun-deck on HMS Victory.

Brennan carved a life-size lion figurehead and he also worked on the scrollwork around the entrance port on the middle gun-deck of Lord Nelson's flagship HMS Victory which is currently in dry dock at Portsmouth's Royal Naval Dockyard. Today, HMS Victory serves as flagship of the United Kingdom's Second Sea Lord and the Royal Navy's Commander-in-Chief Naval Home Command. Brennan's sculptural work was part of an ongoing restoration and maintenance programme for the oldest commissioned warship in the world.

Other marine sculptures includes the Cunard crest displayed in the Grand Lobby of the ocean liner MS Queen Victoria.

A less successful work was his £102,000 sculpture of Southampton FC chairman Ted Bates. This was removed a week after unveiling, due to fans' complaints that it looked nothing like Bates.
