= Bruce Metcalf =

American artist (born 1949)

Bruce Metcalf (born September 30, 1949 in Amherst, Massachusetts) is an American artist who uses different materials including wood, metal, and plexiglass for his works.

== Education ==
He received his B.F.A. in Crafts/Metalsmithing in 1972 at Syracuse University. He also majored in Architecture at Syracuse from 1968-1970. From 1972-73 he attended Montana State University and from 1973-74 attended State University of New York at New Paltz. In 1977, he received his Master of Fine Arts in Metalsmithing and Jewelry at Tyler School of Art at Temple University.

== Grants, fellowships and awards ==
- Artist’s Project Grant, Pew Fellowships in the Arts, 2002
- Pew Fellowship in the Arts, 1996

== Writings ==
- Crafts New Borderland: A Grass Roots Movement of Handcraft is Taking Hold
