= Reuben Heyday Margolin =

American sculptor

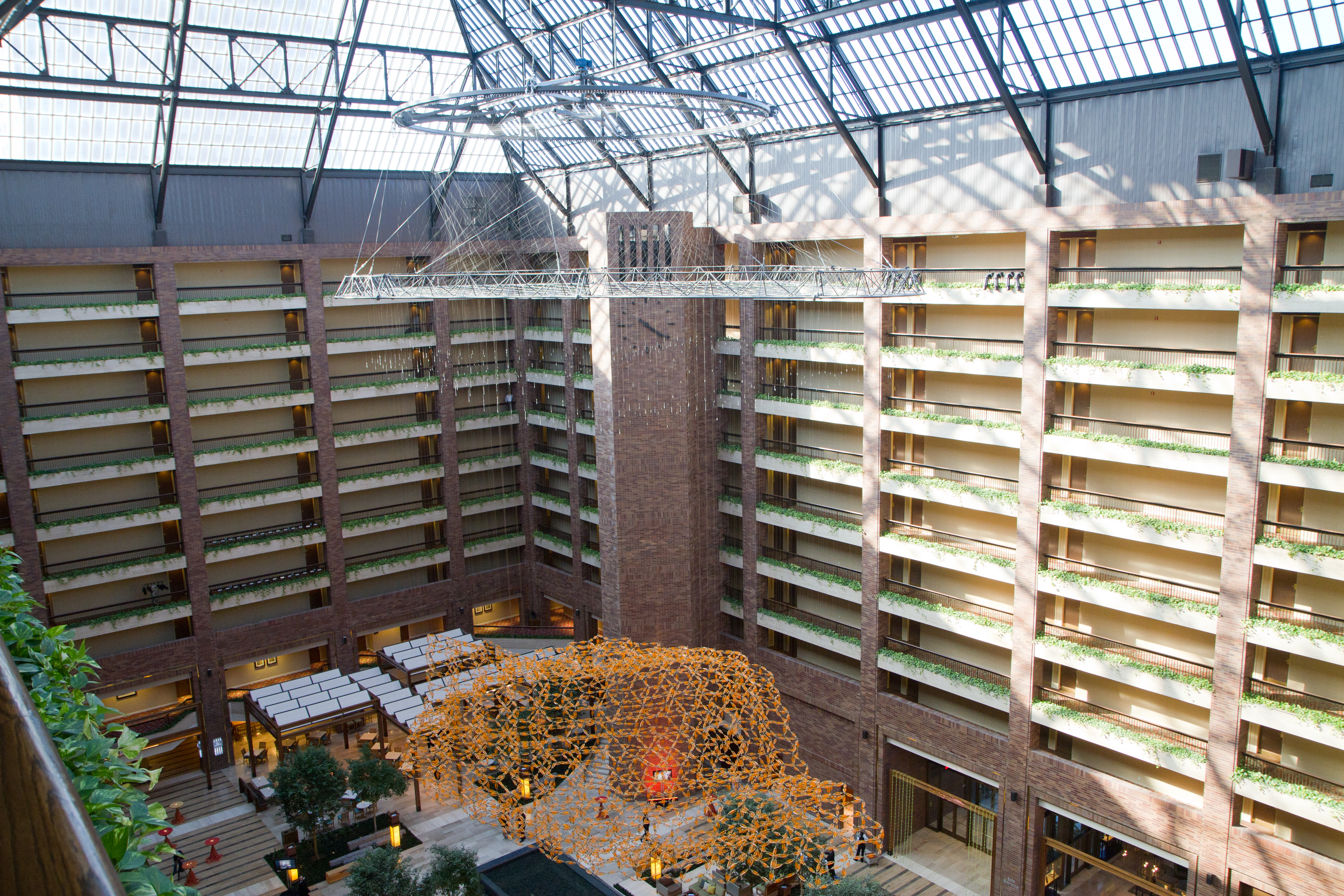
Reuben Margolin's "Nebula", Photo by Michael Prados

Reuben Heyday Margolin is an American-born artist and sculptor known for his mechanically driven kinetic sculptures of wave-forms. Some of the sculptures are hand-cranked and small scale, while others are large, installed in large high-ceiling spaces, suspended from the ceiling. His art also includes drawings, portraiture, traditional sculpture, and rickshaws.

== Education ==
He was educated at Berkeley High School, then at Harvard University, where he earned a BA in English. He later studied drawing in Florence, Italy and Monumental painting at the St. Petersburg Academy of Arts, Russia.

== Career ==
In Autumn of 2010, Margolin installed "Nebula", a kinetic art work with 4,500 amber crystals, in the Hilton Anatole Hotel in Dallas, Texas. The piece has been described as "perhaps the most ambitious kinetic sculpture ever commissioned."
