= Sara Zewde =

- Born: Sara Zewde; 1985 (age 40–41); New Orleans, Louisiana, U.S.

Academic background
- Education: Harvard Graduate School of Design, Massachusetts Institute of Technology, and Boston University
- Thesis: Ecologies of Memory : Landscape Architectural Methods in an Expanded Understanding of Culture (2015)

Sara Zewde (born 1985, New Orleans) is an American landscape architect, co-founder of Studio Zewde, and Associate Professor in Practice of Landscape Architecture at the Harvard Graduate School of Design.

== Early life ==
Zewde was born in Houston to a family who immigrated from Ethiopia. Recalling her upbringing in a poem-essay as part of the 2018 Dimensions of Citizenship at the US Pavilion of the Biennale 2018, Zewde said of her experience as the child of African immigrants, growing up Black in the American South, "Exclusion fiercely shapes my psychology. I entered the field of landscape architecture. The first step was to wrestle with the word 'land.'” Zewde's work addresses her awareness of the complex and conflicting roles that land, land ownership, and labor have played in shaping Black identity and history.

== Education ==
Zewde received her Master of Landscape Architecture degree from Harvard Graduate School of Design, a Master of City Planning degree from Massachusetts Institute of Technology and a Bachelor of Art in sociology and statistics from Boston University. Her thesis at Harvard was titled "Ecologies of Memory: Landscape Architectural Methods in an Expanded Understanding of Culture."

While at Harvard, Zewde was named the 2014 National Olmsted Scholar by the Landscape Architecture Foundation. At MIT, she received the Silberberg Memorial Award for Urban Design and the Hebbert Award for Contribution to the Department of Urban Studies and Planning. Prior to teaching at Harvard, Zewde taught at the Columbia Graduate School of Architecture, Planning and Preservation and the University of Texas at Austin School of Architecture.

== Career ==
Sara Zewde founded Studio Zewde, a design practice that works in landscape architecture, urban design and public art. Based in Harlem in New York City, Studio Zewde cultivates work that supports "the aesthetics of being," using a design methodology that brings together the characteristics of the site with the stories it can tell. The goal is to create places that inspire a sense of belonging. Studio Zewde draws on a wide variety of talent to achieve its multi-disciplinary work, including landscape architecture, architecture, city planning, urban design, sociology, statistics, community organizing, and public art. Prior to founding her practice, she worked for the design firms Hood Design Studio in Oakland and Gustafson Guthrie Nichol in Seattle.

== Projects ==
- Mander Recreation Center Campus, in Fairmount Park, Philadelphia
- Graffiti Pier, Philadelphia
- Valongo Wharf, Rio de Janeiro
- Midtown Activation Plaza, Africatown, Seattle
- Genesee Street, Houston
- Dia Beacon, Beacon, NY

== Awards & honors ==
Zewde has received awards and honors for her work including the Artist-in-Residence at the Robert Rauschenberg Foundation in 2016 and National Trust for Historic Preservation's inaugural “40 Under 40: People Saving Places” in 2018. Zwede participated in the Venice Biennale in 2016 and 2018 as part of the Brazilian and U.S pavilions. In 2020, she was named a fellow by United States Artists.
