= Robert Janz =

American visual artist (1932–2021)

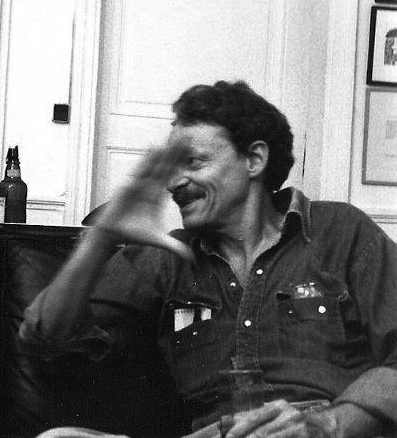
- Robert Janz in 1988
- Born: December 25, 1932; Belfast, Northern Ireland
- Died: October 26, 2021 (aged 88); Tribeca, New York City, New York
- Education: Maryland Institute College of Art
- Known for: Time-based art; process art; minimalist sculpture
- Notable work: Six Sticks
- Website: www.janzworkon.com

Robert Janz (Belfast December 25, 1932 - New York City October 26, 2021), was a New York-based visual artist whose work often dealt with ephemeral phenomena. His work has been described as having a "nomadic aspect", exploring "change and transience" and the temporary quality of life.

== Early life and education ==
Janz was born to American parents in Belfast, Northern Ireland in 1932. Because his father worked in the diplomatic corps he traveled with his parents and sister to many locations around the world including Brazil, the Canary Islands, Panama and Israel.

He began his studies at age 16 in literature at the University of Chicago, and was later educated at the Maryland Institute College of Art, where he graduated with a MFA degree. Janz taught in London, Berlin and Spain.

An early mentor was the kinetic sculptor George Rickey, who employed him as an assistant.

== Work ==
Janz cites the work of the 17th century Japanese Haiku poet, Basho, as an early influence for his visual art. In his 20's Janz was sent to prison for resisting being drafted into the military. While incarcerated, a prison occupational therapist who had studied in Japan taught him how to work in ceramics to produce stoneware bowls using ancient Japanese techniques.

In the 1970s, Janz created several time-based works of process art, including Six Sticks; Unfolding Sculptures; Shadow Lines; Chalk Shadows; Changing Lines; and Drawing in Parts. His 1970s works were informal, nomadic and ephemeral, and often documented photographically.

Later in his life, Janz focused on producing graffiti-type works in lower Manhattan. He would reconfigure paper advertisement posters, transforming them into images of birds, flowers, faces and landscapes; he also added painted imagery and wrote on billboards in the form of wordplay poetry. He also created a series of temporary graffiti works using only water brushed onto urban sidewalks and building facades. These works would evaporate, leaving only the photographs that documented the residue of the actions.

=== Six Sticks ===
In the 1970s Janz produced a series of recombinatory "stick sculptures" that could be arranged in a multiplicity of spatial variations within a set of conceptual constraints. In an exhibit brochure published by the Los Angeles County Museum of Art, Janz writes:

"The work in this exhibition, like all my work, originates in a love for the nomadic, the flexible and adaptive, and form that changes form. It proceeds from the ordinary observation that a blanket, or a shadow, or a set of dishes, is a single traveling shape."

Janz created several sets of Six Sticks that he deployed in spaces to explore changes in location and form by arranging and rearranging the sticks and photographing and exhibiting the various permutations. Some of the sets had different criteria for arrangement, such as in doorways or in glades. He also created "rules" such as arrangements where all the sticks must be touching, or all sticks were to lean against a wall at the same exact angle. These nomadic works could then be easily stacked and stored. This series was influenced by his travels in southern Spain while on a fellowship in 1965, which he describes as the beginning of his itinerant art of "rearrangement, portability and change" that are "open ended rather than fixed." He goes on to state:

"The versatility, adaptability and compactness valued by campers, mariners and gypsies have been a source for my thinking and so have the attitudes of many early cultures. The philosophies of ancient China, for instance, with their emphasis on the dynamic flow that continuously relates all things, are fundamental to an art of changes."

In a review in Artforum, the art critic, Christopher Knight describes the work as "site-related", in that the artist and his objects are tied to the cirumstances of a particular place and situation that co-mingle as an interactive process.

== Exhibitions ==
Janz exhibited his work internationally in Barcelona, Belfast, Los Angeles, Chicago, Lyon, Dublin, Montreal, among other locations. His work was included in three exhibitions at the Museum of Modern Art, New York, as well as White Columns, the Irish Museum of Modern Art among other venues. Janz' work was featured in two solo-shows at the Institute for Art and Urban Resources in New York City (now MoMA/P.S.1), as well as several one-person exhibitions at L.A. Louver Gallery.

== Legacy ==
In 2020 a documentary film was made on him, titled Janz: In the Moment.

== Collections ==
His work is included in the collections of the Portland Art Museum, the Barcelona Museum of Contemporary Art, the Williams College Museum of Art, the Neuberger Museum of Art, among other venues.

== Personal life ==
Janz married the artist, Jennifer S. Kotter in 2009; they met in 1994, and she was his partner for 27 years.
