= Pam Conrad =

American children's writer

Pam Conrad (June 18, 1947 – January 22, 1996) was an American children's writer. Her book Our House: Stories of Levittown was a Newbery Medal finalist. Her book Stonewords won an Edgar Award.

Conrad was born in New York City and graduated from the New School for Social Research. She died of breast cancer on January 22, 1996, at the age of 48. She lived in Rockville Centre, New York, where she raised two daughters.

== Books ==
Stonewords (series)

- Stonewords: A Ghost Story (1990)
- Zoe Rising (1996)

Novels

- I Don't Live Here! (1983 or 1984)
- Prairie Songs (1985)
- Holding Me Here (1986)
- What I Did For Roman (1987)
- A Seal Upon My Heart (1988)
- Taking the Ferry Home (1988)
- My Daniel (1989)
- The Lost Sailor (1992)
- Our House: Stories of Levittown (1995)
- Pumpkin Moon (novel for adults) (1994)

Collections

- Bathtub Voyages (1993)

Picture Books

- Seven Silly Circles (1987)
- The Tub People (1989)
- The Tub Grandfather (1993)
- Molly and the Strawberry Day (1994)
- Doll Face Has a Party! (1994)
- Animal Lingo (1995)
- Call Me Ahnighito (1995)
- The Rooster's Gift (1996)
- Animal Lullabies (1997)
- Old Man Hoover's Dead Rabbit (1997)
- This Mess (originally published by Lothrop, Lee & Shepard Books in 1980; published again in 1998, re-illustrated by Elizabeth Sayles)
- Don't Go Near That Rabbit, Frank! (1998)
- Blue Willow (1999)
- The Tub People's Christmas (1999)
- Is Anyone Here My Age? (2005)

Chapter Books

- Staying Nine (1988)

Non fiction

- Prairie Visions: The Life and Times of Solomon Butcher (1991)
- Pedro's Journal (1991)
- Book Guides (2003)
