= The Juniper Tree (opera) =

1985 opera by Philip Glass and Robert Moran

- Opera by: Philip Glass; Robert Moran
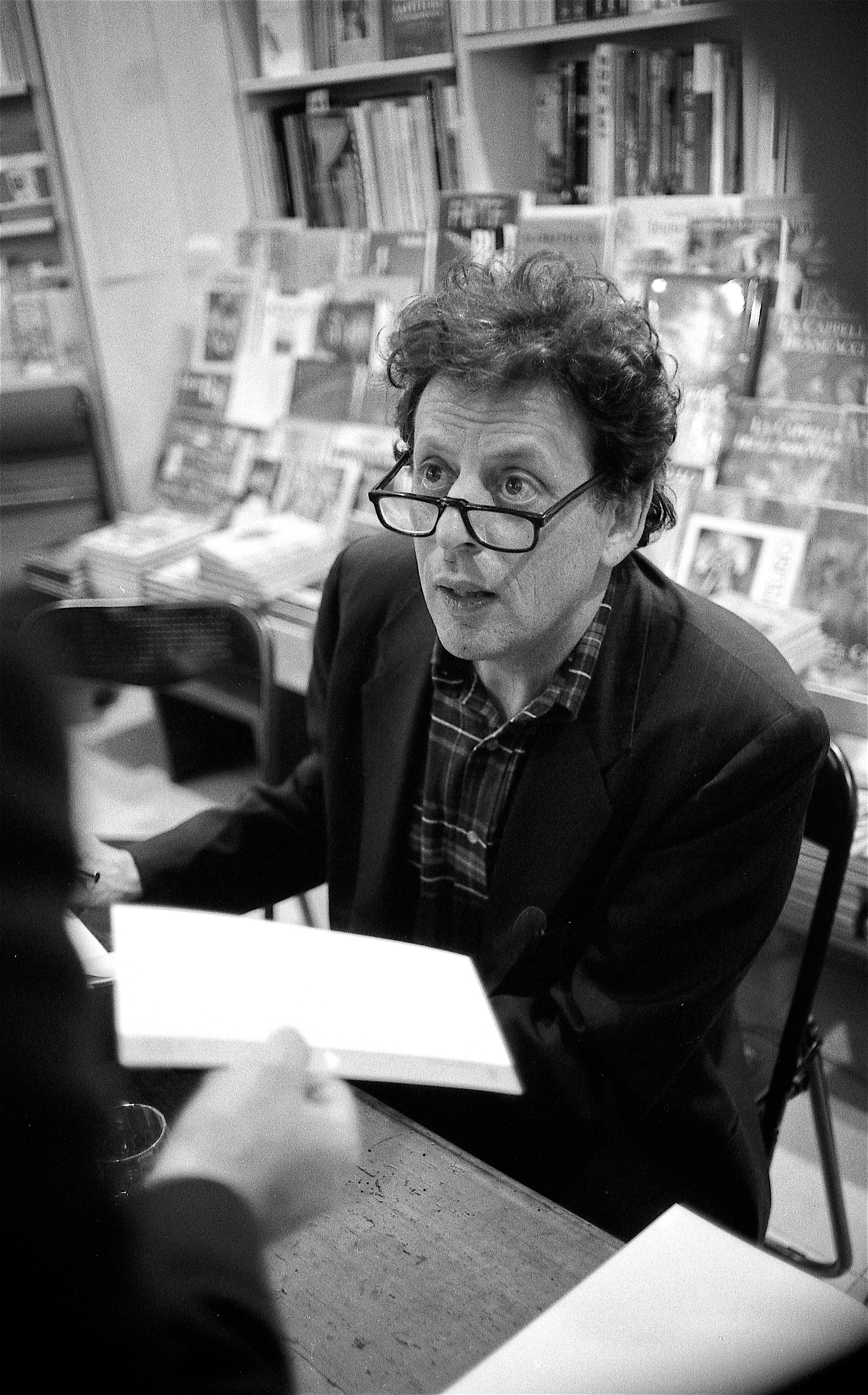
- Glass in 2006
- Librettist: Arthur Yorinks
- Based on: Brothers Grimm fairy tale
- Premiere: December 11, 1985; American Repertory Theater, Cambridge, Massachusetts

The Juniper Tree is an opera co-composed by Philip Glass and Robert Moran in 1985 to a libretto by Arthur Yorinks based on the Brothers Grimm fairy tale.

The opera is in two acts and is scored for two baritones, bass, mezzo-soprano, four sopranos, tenor, mixed chorus, children's voices and chamber orchestra. Each composer wrote alternating scenes and utilized each other's themes to provide structural unity. Glass retained ownership of the opera, and did not allow for the "live" recording of the premiere (with Jayne West and Sanford Sylvan) to be released until 2009. Until then, Moran encouraged his fans to distribute bootleg copies so that people could hear it.

== Performance history ==
It was premiered on December 11, 1985, at the American Repertory Theater in Cambridge, Massachusetts. The first UK performance was premiered by Helen Astrid as part of the Richmond Festival in March 2017 at The Hammond Theatre.

For its 25th anniversary of creation, the Théâtre des Petites Garnottes presented the Canadian premiere of the opera in September, 2010, at the Salle Jean-Paul Tardif in Quebec, Canada.

== Roles ==
Role	Voice type	Premiere cast, December 11, 1985 Conductor: Richard Pittmann
The husband	lyric baritone	Sanford Sylvan
His wife	lyric soprano	Jayne West
The son/the juniper bird	boy soprano	Lynn Torgove
The stepmother	mezzo-soprano	Valerie Walters
Her daughter	soprano	Janet Brown
The goldsmith	bass	David Stoneman
The cobbler	baritone	Thomas Derrah
The miller	tenor	William Cotton
Village folk	chorus	Mary Ann Scipione, Guy F. Pugh, Brian P. De Lorenzo, James Crowther, Murray Wheeler, Jeffrey Korn
Mama bird	soprano	Meredith Borden
Baby birds	children's voices	

== Synopsis ==
The Grimm fairy tale tells of a wicked stepmother who murders her stepson, fearing that he reminds her husband of his late wife and serves him up in a stew to his hungry, unsuspecting father. The boy's sister buries her brother's bones under a juniper tree where their mother is buried, and the child's spirit returns as a singing bird who wreaks vengeance on the evil stepmother (dropping a millstone on her) before being restored to life in the bosom of his family.
