= Robert Moran (composer) =

American composer of operas and ballets (born 1937)

- Born: January 8, 1937 (age 89); Denver, Colorado, U.S.
- Occupation: Composer
- Known for: operas and ballets as well as numerous orchestral, vocal, chamber and dance works.

Robert Moran (born January 8, 1937) is an American composer of operas and ballets as well as numerous orchestral, vocal, chamber and dance works.

== Life ==
A native of Denver, Moran studied twelve-tone music privately with Hans Apostel in Vienna and completed his Master of Arts degree in 1963 at Mills College in Oakland, California, where he studied with Darius Milhaud and Luciano Berio (Ruppenthal and Patterson 2001). After having lived for periods ranging from a few months to a couple of years in various locales, from Vienna, Berlin, New York City, and Milan to Portland and San Francisco, he has made Philadelphia his home since 1984.

Many of his works have been recorded: his two albums for Argo Records were taken out of print, but reissued as a two CD set by Innova Records, which also released a new CD of his music. Some of his music has been made available in mp3 format at the classical midi archives site (Tyranny and Anon. 2008). The Juniper Tree was issued on CD in 2009.

== Works ==
=== Operas ===
- The Juniper Tree (1985) (co-composed with Philip Glass)
- Desert of Roses (premiered February 1992 at Houston Grand Opera)
- From the Towers of the Moon (premiered March 1992 at Minnesota Opera)
- The Dracula Diary (premiered March 1994 at Houston Grand Opera)
- Night Passage (1995)

Miniature operas with durations of less than ten minutes, for a variety of voices and small instrumental ensembles: "Remember Him to Me", "So Suddenly a War", "Your Pig is Dead" and others. The libretti-fragments are by Gertrude Stein.

=== Ballets ===
- Rocky Road to Kansas (1995)
- "Waltz In Memoriam Maurice Ravel" for piano
- "Wendekreise" world premiere at the Bavarian State Opera, 1972
- "ALICE" full length ballet, commissioned by the Scottish Ballet, world premiere April 2011

=== Other works ===
- For Organ (1967)
- Thirty Nine Minutes for Thirty Nine Autos (August 1969)
- Hallelujah (1971)
- Emblems of Passage (1974)
- Dream Quilt (1997)
- The Eternal Hour (1974)
- Pachelbel Promenade
- Waltz in Memoriam Maurice Ravel (1977) for piano (also arranged for harp by Falcao)
- Ten Miles High Over Albania (1983)
- Three Dances (1983/86)
- Survivor From Darmstadt (1984)
- Open Veins (1986)
- Halicarnassian Quartet
- Leipziger Kerzenspiel
- Three Baroque Songs (1988)
- Requiem: Chant Du Cygne (March 1990)
- Points of Departure (1993)
- Seven Sounds Unseen (1993)
- 32 Cryptograms for Derek Jarman (1995)
- Obrigado (1996)
- Voce Della Fontana (1998)
- Stimmen Des Letzten Siegels (Voices of the Last Seal) (2001)
- Trinity Requiem (commemorating the 10th anniversary of September 11, 2001) (2011) (Amico 2011).
- Mantra recorded by the Latvian Radio Choir, from the album Mantra of Moran's works
