= Temple of the Golden Pavilion (disambiguation) =

Kinkaku-ji, or Temple of the Golden Pavilion, is a Buddhist temple in Kyoto, Japan, once burned down in 1950 when it was destroyed by arson after surviving World War II intact.

Temple of the Golden Pavilion or Golden Pavilion Temple may also refer to:

- Jinge Temple, a Buddhist temple in Shanxi, China
- Kinkaku-ji replica in the Kyoto Gardens of Honolulu Memorial Park
- The Temple of the Golden Pavilion, a 1956 novel written by Yukio Mishima which is loosely based on the 1950 destruction of Kinkaku-ji
- Conflagration, a 1958 film directed by Kon Ichikawa based on the Mishima novel
- Kinkaku-ji, a 1976 film directed by Yoichi Takabayashi based on the Mishima novel
- Kinkaku-ji (German: Der Tempelbrand), a 1976 German language opera composed by Toshiro Mayuzumi based on the Mishima novel
- Kinkaku-ji (English language release title: Golden Pavilion Temple), a Japanese pornographic film series produced by VIP, notable for the performance of AV idol Rui Sakuragi in second film in the series

== See also ==
- Kon-dō, a Japanese term referring to the main hall of a Buddhist temple complex which is typically translated into English as "golden hall"
- Golden Temple (disambiguation)
