= Darbar =

Darbar may refer to:

- Durbar (court), a term for a court in Urdu (from Persian darbar)
- Darbar-e Azam, a council of ministers implemented in 1872 in Qajar Iran constituting a cabinet
- Darbar (Raga), a musical scale/mode of South Indian classical music (Carnatic music)
- Darbar (film), a 2020 Indian Tamil-language action film
- Darbar Festival, an Indian classical music festival
- Darbar Sahib (disambiguation)
  - Darbar (title) or Darbar Saheb is a title of honor used in India
- Darbar, Iran (disambiguation), places in Iran

== See also ==
- Durbar (disambiguation)
- Darbari Kanada, a raga in Hindustani classical music
