= Darbar, Iran =

Darbar (Persian: داربار or دربر or داربر or دربار) in Iran may refer to:

- Darbar, Kerman (دربر - Darbar), a village in Kerman Province, Iran
- Darbar, Markazi (دربر - Darbar), a village in Markazi Province, Iran
- Darbar, Mazandaran (داربار - Dārbār), a village in Mazandaran Province, Iran
- Darbar, Semnan (دربار - Darbār), a village in Semnan Province, Iran
