= Golden Temple (disambiguation) =

Golden Temple, also known as the Harmandir Sahib, is a Sikh temple (gurdwara) and the holiest Sikh site in Amritsar, India.

Golden Temple may also refer to:

== Places ==
- Hiranya Varna Mahavihar, informally called "Golden Temple," Buddhist temple in Patan, Nepal
- Golden Temple Park, a Taoist temple in Yunnan, China
- Golden Temple of Dambulla, a Buddhist cave temple complex in Sri Lanka
- Golden Temple, Sripuram or Sri Lakshmi Narayani Golden Temple, a Hindu temple in Vellore district, Tamil Nadu, India
- Durgiana Temple, Hindu temple in Amritsar, Punjab, India
- Shantinath Jain Teerth, Jain temple in Indapur, Maharashtra

== Other ==
- The Golden Temple (film), a 2012 documentary film directed by Enrico Masi
- Golden Temple Mail, an express train to the Sikh temple in Punjab, India

== See also ==
- Darbar Sahib (disambiguation)
- Temple of the Golden Pavilion (disambiguation)
- The Temple of Gold, a 1957 novel by William Goldman
