= Durbar =

Durbar may refer to:

- Conference of Rulers, a council of Malay monarchs
- Durbar festival, a yearly festival in several towns of Nigeria
- Durbar floor plate, a hot-rolled structural steel that has been designed to give excellent slip resistance on its upper surface
- Durbar (court), a historical Mughal court in India; also used for a ceremonial gathering under the British Raj
- Darbar Sahib Hall, the main room in a Gurdwara, in which the Sache Patishah (True Emperor) Sri Guru Granth Sahib is placed
- Delhi Durbar, assemblies in Delhi, India, to mark the succession of an Emperor or Empress of India under the British Raj
- Durbar (horse), a French racehorse, winner of the 1914 Epsom Derby
- Durbar (title), a title of honour in princely India
- Durbar Square

== See also ==
- Darbar (disambiguation)
