= Darbar Sahib =

Darbar Sahib may refer to:

- Darbar Sahib Hall, main hall in a Sikh gurdwara
- Sri Darbar Sahib, the Golden Temple, the holiest Gurdwara (temple) of Sikhism, in Amritsar, India
- Gurdwara Darbar Sahib Kartarpur, a holy Sikh temple in Kartarpur, Pakistan
- Guru Ram Rai Darbar Sahib, a gurudwara established by Guru Ram Rai in Dehradun, India
- Darbar (title) or Darbar Sahib, an Indian honorific title

== See also ==
- Darbar (disambiguation)
- Sahab (disambiguation)
- Golden Temple (disambiguation)
