= Darbar, Markazi =

Darbar دربر
- Village
- Location within Iran
- Coordinates: 34°53′51″N 49°52′16″E
- Country: Iran
- Province: Markazi
- County: Tafresh
- Bakhsh: Central
- Rural District: Bazarjan

Population (2006)
  - Total: 93
- Time zone: UTC+3:30 (IRST)
  - Summer (DST): UTC+4:30 (IRDT)

Darbar (Persian: دربر, also Romanized as Dar-e Bar) is a village in Bazarjan Rural District, in the Central District of Tafresh County, Markazi Province, Iran. According to the 2006 census, it had a population of 93, in 26 families.
