= Darbar-e Azam =

The Darbar-e Azam (lit. "the great court") was established in October 1872 under Qajar shah Naser al-Din Shah (r. 1848-1896). It was a council of ministers, constituting a cabinet, and was composed of the sadr-e azam (grand vizier) and nine other ministers. The Darbar-e Azam was established as a result of several tests undertaken during Naser al-Din Shah's rule in order to improve the effectiveness of Iran's administration on Western model. The nine other ministers in addition to the sadr-e azam were: of war, finance, justice, foreign affairs, interior, education, public works, court, commerce and agriculture. Together with the sadr-e azam, these ministers were responsible for running the entire Iranian government.
