= Kinkaku-ji arson =

1950 arson in Kyoto, Japan

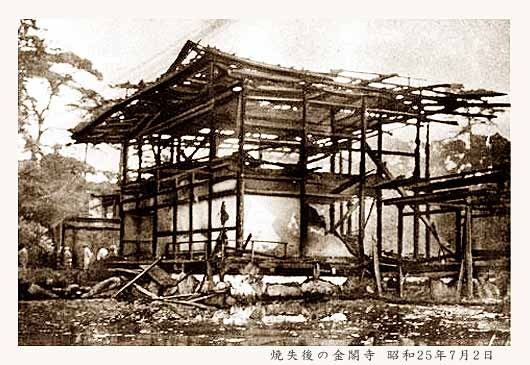
Kinkaku-ji almost burned down

In the Kinkaku-ji arson incident (Japanese: 金閣寺放火事件, Hepburn: Kinkakuji-hoka-jiken), on 2 July 1950, the novice monk Hayashi Shoken almost destroyed Kinkaku-ji, a Zen Buddhist temple in Kyoto, Japan, and the statue of Ashikaga Yoshimitsu within it. The arson was taken as an incident as serious as the fire in Hōryū-ji in 1949 by the Ministry of Education, Science, Sports and Culture. Hayashi later attempted suicide, while his mother killed herself in shame. That December, Hayashi was sentenced to seven years in prison, although he was released due to his deteriorating mental condition and tuberculosis. He died on 7 March 1956. Kinkaku-ji was rebuilt from 1952 to 1955.

== Background ==
=== Kinkaku-ji ===
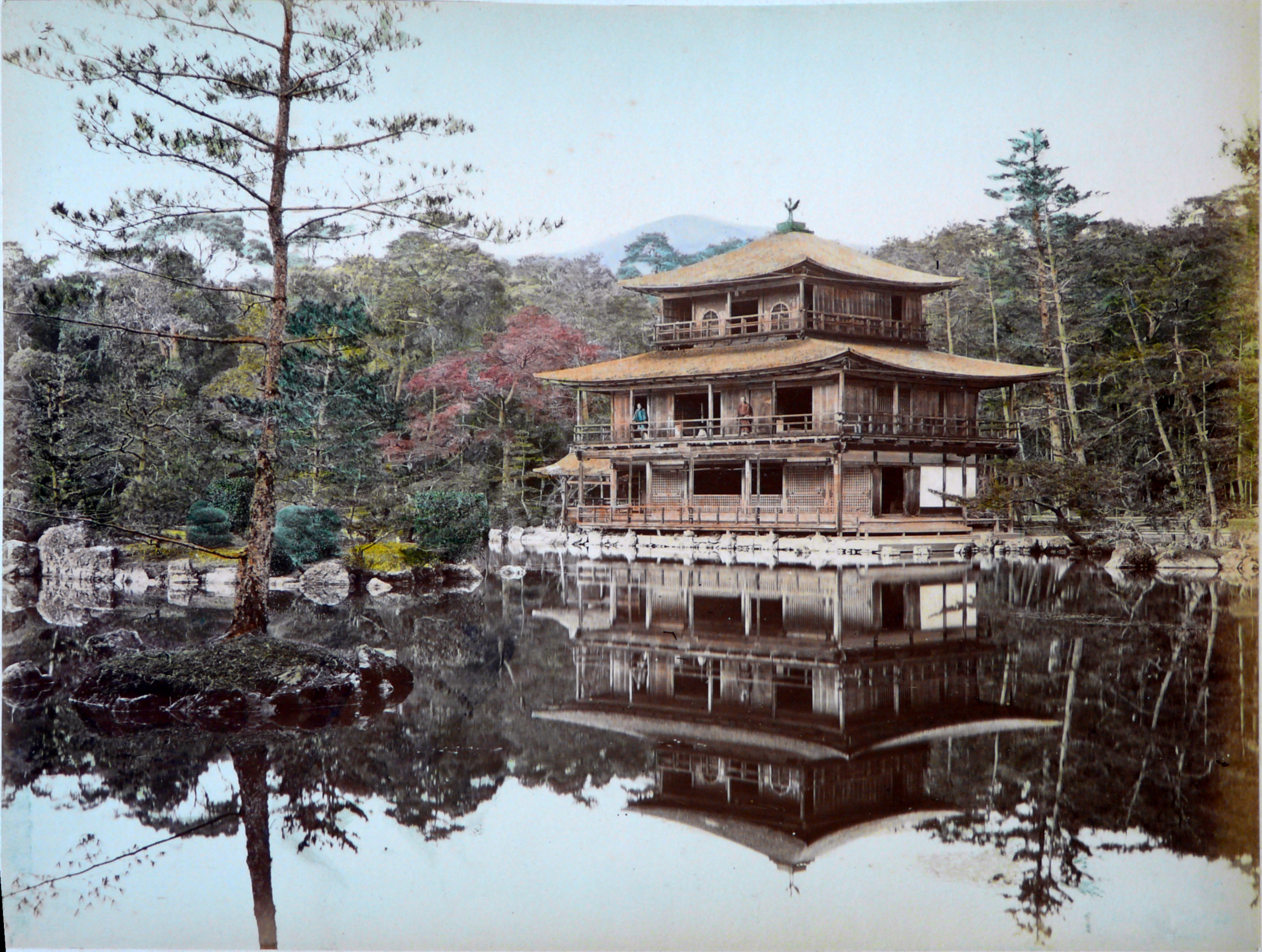
Painted photograph of the Golden Pavilion in 1885. The gold leaf is peeling off due to deterioration over time.

The site of Kinkaku-ji was originally a villa called Kitayama-dai (北山第), belonging to a powerful statesman, Saionji Kintsune. Kinkaku-ji's history dates to 1397, when the villa was purchased from the Saionji family by shōgun Ashikaga Yoshimitsu and transformed into the Kinkaku-ji complex. The original Golden Pavilion is believed to have been constructed in 1399. Gold was an important addition to the pavilion because of its underlying meaning: it was intended to mitigate and purify any pollution or negative thoughts and feelings towards death. When Yoshimitsu died, the building was converted into a Zen temple by his son, according to his wishes. The temple was designated as a National Treasure on December 28, 1897, and restoration works took place from 1904 to 1906. The wooden statue of Ashikaga Yoshimitsu was placed in the first layer of the temple, which was made in 1408.

=== Hayashi Shoken ===
Hayashi Shoken, the person who set the pavilion on fire, was a 22-year-old novice monk. He grew up in a temple, although the temple was not able to maintain itself without donations from local residents. He entered Kinkaku-ji in 1944. Two years after enrolling in Ōtani University in 1947, Shoken started playing Go instead of studying, ignoring warnings from other people. By his last year, he had the worst grades out of 79 people in the University. Around 1950, he had engaged in cheating during exams, submitting blank paper, and throwing people in the temple, claiming it was judo practice. For his relationships, he never visited his classmates, although his classmates sometimes stopped by when they visited Kinkaku-ji.

== Progression ==
Although Hayashi wanted to take over Kinkaku-ji by becoming the successor of the temple, he felt that the head priest of the temple had treated him in a cold way since 1949. As he felt that he was being treated poorly compared to the others in the temple, and lost his initial wishes, he despaired at his situation and decided to commit suicide after setting Kinkaku-ji and the statue of Ashikaga Yoshimitsu inside on fire.

On 13 June, he was warned again by the head priest to go to school. Despite him answering that he would go to school that day, he was never seen at school. On 17 June, Hayashi sold his Inverness cape and travelled to the local yūkaku (red-light district). On his second visit the next day, he sold his overcoat and told the local woman "My name is going on the newspapers". On 22 June, he bought 100 tablets of bromisoval, a sedative, despite being warned by the medic that 100 was too much and he should buy the package with 30 tablets instead. The fire alarm in the Kinkaku-ji broke down on 29 June, and was planned to be repaired on 2 July.

At 3 a.m. on 2 July, Hayashi snuck inside the temple and stacked his belongings on top of the offering box in front of the statue of Ashikaga Yoshimitsu. He then placed a pile of hay below the offering box and set it on fire. The fire was discovered at 3:07. Fire trucks arrived six minutes later. By 3:17, the entire Kinkaku-ji was engulfed in fire. The roof of the temple collapsed 23 minutes later, with the fire finally being brought under control around 3:50. Many National Treasures were burned in the fire, including the wooden statue of Ashikaga Yoshimitsu and Kinkaku-ji itself. Some survived the fire, such as the roof ornament of the temple, as the ornament placed on top of Kinkaku-ji was a replica and the original was stored inside a warehouse. Police inferred that Hayashi was responsible for the fire after the remains of his belongings were found burnt inside Kinkaku-ji. Around 4–7 p.m., Hayashi was found while attempting suicide in the mountain. He had stabbed himself in the chest and consumed all the bromisoval tablets.

== Aftermath ==
On the evening of 2 July, Kyoto Shimbun reported the incident on the first page with the heading "National Treasure Kinkaku-ji lost in fire this morning", although on 3 July the page was changed to report the Korean War. Although the report mourned the loss of Kinkaku-ji and discussed ways to protect National Treasures, it did not discuss Hayashi's motives for the arson attack. The Ministry of Education, Culture, Sports, Science and Technology took the incident as seriously as the fire at Hōryū-ji, and even considered de-listing Kinkaku-ji as a National Treasure due to the incident. On 27 July, the ministry decided to rebuild the temple.

On 3 July, after hearing the news, Hayashi's mother killed herself by jumping into a river from a train in the section of San'in Main Line between Hozukyō Station and Umahori Station. Before killing herself, she commented in the police station "My son is a traitor to the nation. Why couldn't he die after doing such an act? How can I pay for such a crime? This crime cannot be compared to any other crimes. If I can die instead of him to pay for his sins, I'll gladly do so."

On 13 July, Hayashi was prosecuted for arson and violating the National Treasure Preservation Law. In the first trial, which was held on 24 July, Hayashi admitted the crimes but did not agree with the prosecutor's assumption that he had set the temple on fire because of self-hatred, envy of beautiful things, hatred for society, and curiosity about how society would react to the fire. Although his lawyers claimed that Hayashi was mentally unstable and could not be held responsible for the crime, Hayashi stood up and denied the claim. He was determined to accept full responsibility for his crime. On December 18, he was sentenced to seven years in prison.

In 1951, Hayashi was imprisoned in Kakogawa. He sent letters to the head priest of the temple he had been in, repeatedly apologizing for the crime. His mental state deteriorated after his imprisonment, and the contents of the letters slowly turned into messages such as "I will fall into hell", "What color is my blood", and "I don't have any place to live". In 1952, his sentence was reduced to five years and three months. Hayashi contracted tuberculosis in June that year. Due to worsening conditions, he was moved to a prison in Hachiōji the next year. In Hachioji, he refused to take anything given by the prison, with the exception of a single loaf of bread, sugar, and 360ml of milk given by a nurse. He died of tuberculosis in 1956, a year after he was released in Kyoto.

=== Restoration of Kinkaku-ji ===
Some people suggested Kinkaku-ji be rebuilt and restored with reinforced concrete, keeping the exterior appearance similar to the original. This idea was supported because doing so would have prevented damage from further arson attacks, but it never became a reality since committees insisted on rebuilding Kinkaku-ji with wooden materials.

Gathering funds for the restoration was difficult due to the price hikes caused by the Korean War, but enough funds were gathered with the help of monks doing dhutanga (ascetic practices). Restoration began on March 22, 1952 and was completed on October 10, 1955. Since Kinkaku-ji had been modified over its 500 year history, several changes took place to restore it to the condition it had been in when first built. This removed some stairs, entrances, and windows that were added over time and restored room layouts to how it was when it was built. The arson incident is not mentioned on the temple's official website.

=== Novel ===
The incident was the inspiration for Yukio Mishima's novel The Temple of the Golden Pavilion, published in 1956. The novel was translated into English by Ivan Morris in 1959. It was also adapted into Kon Ichikawa's film Conflagration.
