= The Temple of the Golden Pavilion =

Novel by Yukio Mishima

- Cover of the first edition
- Author: Yukio Mishima
- Original title: Kinkakuji (金閣寺)
- Translator: Ivan Morris
- Language: Japanese; English
- Publisher: Shinchosha
- Publication date: 1956
- Publication place: Japan
- English publication date: 1959
- Media type: Print (hardback & paperback)
- Pages: 247 pp (hardback edition)
- ISBN: 1-85715-169-0 (hardback edition)
- OCLC: 59908578

The Temple of the Golden Pavilion (金閣寺, Kinkaku-ji) is a novel by the Japanese author Yukio Mishima. It was published in 1956 and translated into English by Ivan Morris in 1959.

The novel is loosely based on the burning of the Reliquary (or Golden Pavilion) of Kinkaku-ji in Kyoto by a young Buddhist acolyte in 1950. The pavilion, dating from before 1400, was a national monument that had been spared destruction many times throughout history, and the arson shocked Japan.

== Plot ==
The protagonist, Mizoguchi, is the son of a consumptive Buddhist priest who lives and works on Cape Nariu on the north coast of Honshū. As a child, the narrator lives with his uncle near Maizuru. Throughout his childhood he is assured by his father that the Golden Pavilion is the most beautiful building in the world, and the idea of the temple becomes a fixture in his imagination. His stammering and poverty cause him to be friendless. A neighbour's girl, Uiko, becomes the target of his hatred. After she is killed by her deserter boyfriend, Mizoguchi becomes convinced that his curse on her has worked.

His ill father takes him to the Kinkaku-ji in the spring of 1944, and introduces him to the Superior, Tayama Dosen. After his father's death, Mizoguchi becomes an acolyte at the temple. He meets his first real friend, Tsurukawa there. During the 1944–5 school year, he works at a factory, where he comes to hope that the Golden Pavilion will be destroyed by the firebombing. However, Kyoto is never firebombed. In May 1945, he and Tsurukawa visit Nanzen-ji and witness a woman giving her lover a cup of tea with her own breast milk.

The Temple is visited by a drunk American soldier who orders Mizoguchi to trample his pregnant Japanese girlfriend's stomach, giving him two cartons of cigarettes. Mizoguchi gives them to the Superior. Father Dosen thanks him, and tells him he will attend Ōtani University. A week later the girl visits the temple and demands compensation. The Superior gives her money, but rumours of her claims spread.

He starts to drift away from Tsurukawa, befriending Kashiwagi, a cynical clubfooted boy from Sannomiya. Kashiwagi seduces women by making them feel sorry for him. In May, Kashiwagi invites him to a picnic at Kameyama Park, taking two girls. When left alone with the other girl, she tells him a story about a woman who lost her lover during the war. He realises that the woman is one he saw two years before. That evening, Mizoguchi becomes aware of Tsurukawa's death in an accident. In the spring of 1948, Kashiwagi mentions that he is being taught ikebana by the woman Mizoguchi saw. Mizoguchi tells her about his experiences. She tries to seduce him, but he experiences visions of the temple.

As Mizoguchi's mental illness worsens, he neglects his studies, and is reprimanded. Mizoguchi responds by borrowing ¥3000 from Kashiwagi. He goes to Takeisao-jinja and draws a lot which warns him not to travel northwest. He sets off northwest the next morning, and spends three days at Yura, where the sight of the Sea of Japan inspires him to destroy the Kinkaku. By May, his debt has grown to ¥5100. Kashiwagi is angry, and comes to suspect that Mizoguchi is considering suicide. To prevent this, he reveals that Tsurukawa committed suicide over a love affair.

Mizoguchi spends his tuition on prostitutes in the hope that Dosen will expel him. After this fails, he buys arsenic and a knife at a shop near Senbon-Imadegawa. On 30 June, a repairman tries to fix the temple's fire alarm, but he is unsuccessful, and promises to return the next day. He does not come. Early next morning, Mizoguchi sneaks into the Kinkaku and places three straw bales in corners of the ground floor. He goes outside to sink some non-inflammable items in the pond, but on turning back to the temple he finds himself filled with his childhood visions of its beauty, and he is overcome by uncertainty.

Finally, he resolves to go ahead with his plan. He enters the Kinkaku and sets the bales on fire. He runs upstairs and tries to enter the Kukkyōchō, but the door is locked. Suddenly feeling that a glorious death has been "refused" to him, he runs back downstairs and out of the temple. He continues running to Hidari Daimonji. He throws away the arsenic and knife and decides to live.

== Reception ==
Hortense Calisher of The New York Times referred to The Temple of the Golden Pavilion as "surely one of his best" and noted that it had been praised upon its 1959 release in the West.

== Allusions and references ==
=== The real story ===
The only proven and detailed information in English on the arson comes from Albert Borowitz's Terrorism for Self-Glorification: The Herostratos Syndrome (2005), which includes translations of interview transcripts published in the book Kinkaku-ji Enjō (1979) by Mizukami Tsutomo, a novelist who had known the boy at school.

The acolyte's name was Hayashi Yōken, and the Superior's name was Murakami Jikai. The prostitute to whom he boasted was called Heya Teruko. Hayashi's mother threw herself in front of a train soon after the event. His sentence was reduced on account of his schizophrenia; he was released on 29 September 1955, the same year that the rebuilding commenced, and died in March 1956. (Borowitz comments that many accounts avoid giving the acolyte's name, perhaps to prevent him from becoming a celebrity.) The pavilion's interior paintings were restored much later; even the gold leaf, which was thought to be mostly worn away before 1950, was replaced.

Mishima collected all the information he could, even visiting Hayashi in prison, and as a result the novel follows the real situation with surprising closeness.

== Film adaptations ==
- Enjō ("Conflagration", 1958), directed by Kon Ichikawa, was by far the most critically successful film to be made from a Mishima novel.
- Kinkakuji ("The Temple of the Golden Pavilion", 1976), directed by Yoichi Takabayashi
- The book was one of three Mishima novels adapted by Paul Schrader for episodes in his film Mishima: A Life in Four Chapters (1985).
