= Darbar, Kerman =

Darbar دربر
- Village
- Location within Iran
- Coordinates: 29°02′01″N 58°00′15″E
- Country: Iran
- Province: Kerman
- County: Bam
- Bakhsh: Central
- Rural District: Howmeh

Population (2006)
  - Total: 93
- Time zone: UTC+3:30 (IRST)
  - Summer (DST): UTC+4:30 (IRDT)

Darbar (Persian: دربر; also known as Delbar) is a village in Howmeh Rural District, in the Central District of Bam County, Kerman Province, Iran. At the 2006 census, its population was 93, composed of 27 households.
