= Golden Temple Park =

Taoist temple in Yunnan, China

Coordinates: 25°05′25″N 102°46′10″E

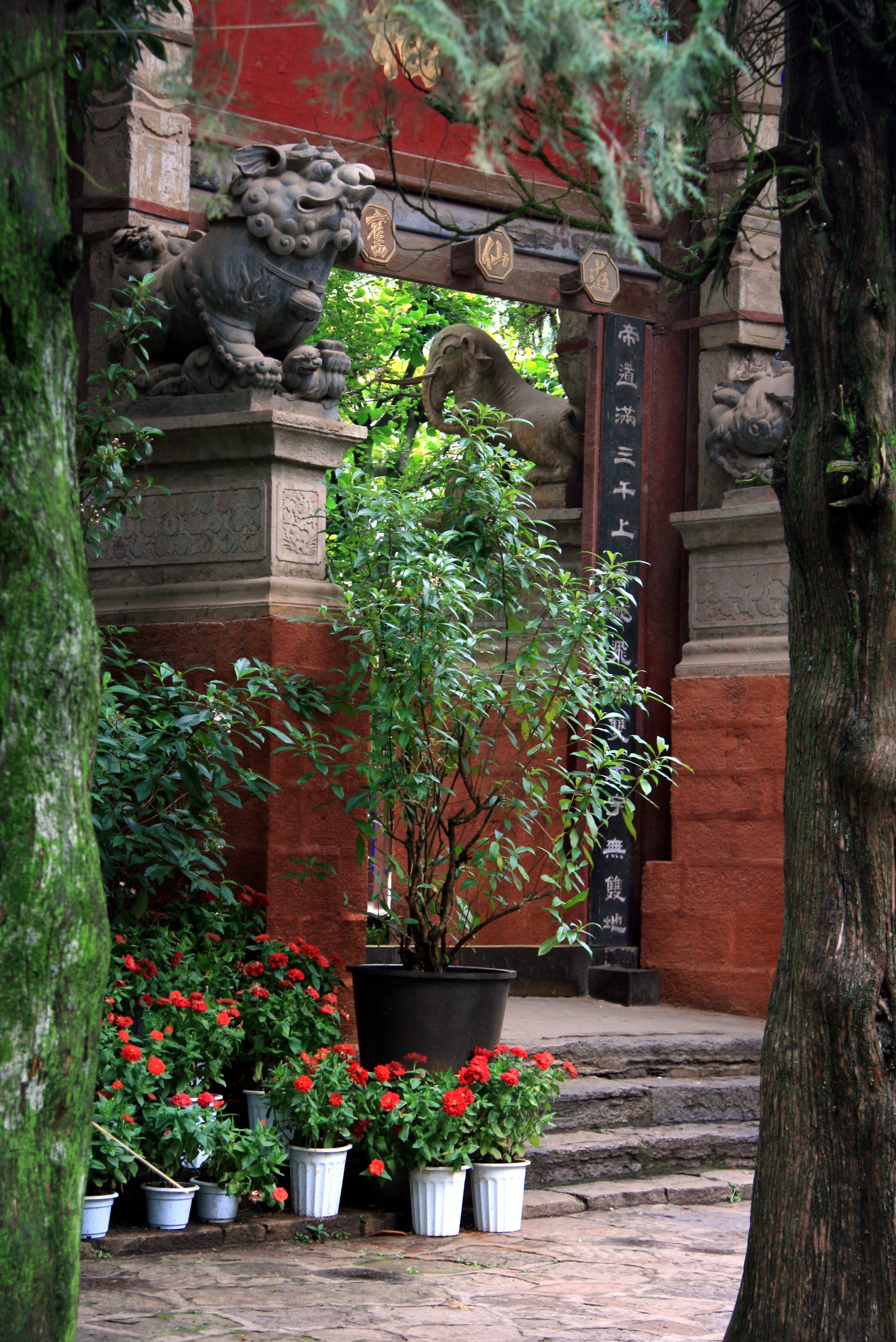
Entrance gate to the Golden Temple

The Golden Temple Park, or Jindian Park (simplified Chinese: 金殿公园; traditional Chinese: 金殿公園; pinyin: Jīndiàn Gōngyuán), is a Taoist bronze-tiled temple in Yunnan, China. Built during the late Ming Dynasty, it is the largest bronze temple in the country, and among the oldest. It is located in the Mingfeng Mountains in the Panlong District of Kunming.

== History ==
The Golden Temple was first built in 1602 during the Ming Dynasty in Dongchuan. The temple's bronze was initially ordered to be sent from Dongchuan to central China to be used as coinage, but the delivery was cancelled due to an armed conflict. The governor of Yunnan, Chen Yongbing, and Mu Changzuo, the Duke of Guizhou, ordered that the bronze be used to build a temple in imitation of the Taihe Palace and the Golden Temple in the Wudang Mountains of Hubei. The temple was later moved to the Jizu Mountains in western Yunnan. During the reign of the Kangxi Emperor (1662-1722), Wu Sangui, a military general who defected from the Ming dynasty and opened Shanhai Pass for the Manchu invaders, rebuilt the temple and kept the original Hubei design. Over 200 tons of bronze were used in the construction of the temple. The walls were made with cast panels covered with exquisite and diverse designs. Today, the walls have become well-preserved examples of the smelting and casting techniques common in Yunnan during the Qing Dynasty.

A three-story bell tower lies behind the temple. 2.1 meters tall and 6.7 meters in circumference, the bell itself was cast in 1424 during the reign of the Yongle Emperor in the Ming dynasty. It was previously hung in the Xuanhua Mansion for timekeeping, but was moved Golden Temple during the expansion of Kunming. In recent years, the Temple has been expanded several times when the "Parrot Garden", the "Camellia Garden", and the "Orchid Garden" were added.
